= Olympian-Packerland Conference =

Wisconsin high school football conference (2007–2014)

The Olympian-Packerland Conference is a former high school football conference with its membership base in northeastern Wisconsin. It was in existence from 2007 through the 2014 football season, and the conference was affiliated with the Wisconsin Interscholastic Athletic Association.

== History ==
Location of Original Olympian-Packerland Conference Members

In 2007, two previously established high school athletic conferences in northeastern Wisconsin, the Olympian and Packerland Conferences, joined forces to create a new football-only conference. All members with the exception of Northeastern Wisconsin Lutheran High School in Green Bay (who did not sponsor football at that time) participated, and the conference was partitioned into divisions for large and small schools:

Olympian-Packerland Large	Olympian-Packerland Small
Chilton	Algoma
Kewaunee	Brillion
Mishicot	Gibraltar
Oconto	Hilbert
Southern Door	Manitowoc Lutheran
Sturgeon Bay	Reedsville
Valders	Roncalli
Wrightstown	Sevastopol
	St. Mary Catholic

Northeastern Wisconsin Lutheran joined the conference in 2010 when it started a football program and was immediately placed in the small schools division. For the 2011 football season, Brillion and Roncalli were moved to the large schools division, and N.E.W. Lutheran played its last season of eleven-man football before leaving the conference to transition to eight-man football. Gibraltar and Sevastopol would do the same after the 2012 football season, and the conference was left with fifteen schools. Mishicot and Oconto were placed with the small schools, which is how it stayed until the Olympian Conference ceased operations after the 2014–2015 school year. The football partnership between the two conferences was also dissolved, with the Packerland Conference reinstating football and the former Olympian Conference schools joining other conferences.

== Conference membership history ==
School	Location	Affiliation	Mascot	Colors	Seasons	Conference Joined	Primary Conference
Algoma	Algoma, WI	Public	Wolves		2007–2014	Packerland	Packerland
Brillion	Brillion, WI	Public	Lions		2007–2014	Eastern Wisconsin	Olympian
Chilton	Chilton, WI	Public	Tigers		2007–2014	Eastern Wisconsin	Olympian
Gibraltar	Fish Creek, WI	Public	Vikings		2007–2012	Great 8	Packerland
Hilbert	Hilbert, WI	Public	Wolves		2007–2014	Big East	Olympian
Kewaunee	Kewaunee, WI	Public	Storm		2007–2014	Packerland	Packerland
Manitowoc Lutheran	Manitowoc, WI	Private (Lutheran, WELS)	Lancers		2007–2014	Big East	Olympian
Mishicot	Mishicot, WI	Public	Indians		2007–2014	Big East	Olympian
Oconto	Oconto, WI	Public	Blue Devils		2007–2014	Packerland	Packerland
Reedsville	Reedsville, WI	Public	Panthers		2007–2014	Big East	Olympian
Roncalli	Manitowoc, WI	Private (Catholic)	Jets		2007–2014	Eastern Wisconsin	Olympian
Sevastopol	Sturgeon Bay, WI	Public	Pioneers		2007–2012	Great 8	Packerland
Southern Door	Brussels, WI	Public	Eagles		2007–2014	Packerland	Packerland
St. Mary Catholic	Neenah, WI	Private (Catholic)	Zephyrs		2007–2014	Big East	Olympian
Sturgeon Bay	Sturgeon Bay, WI	Public	Clippers		2007–2014	Packerland	Packerland
Valders	Valders, WI	Public	Vikings		2007–2014	Eastern Wisconsin	Olympian
Wrightstown	Wrightstown, WI	Public	Tigers		2007–2014	North Eastern	Olympian
N.E.W. Lutheran	Green Bay, WI	Private (Lutheran, LCMS)	Blazers		2010–2011	Great 8	Packerland

== Membership timeline ==
Large Schools Small Schools

== List of state champions ==
Football
School	Year	Division
Brillion	2010	Division 5
Kewaunee	2010	Division 4
Wrightstown	2011	Division 4

== List of conference champions ==
School	Quantity	Years
Brillion	4	2007, 2009, 2010, 2012
Kewaunee	4	2007, 2008, 2009, 2010
Wrightstown	4	2008, 2011, 2012, 2014
Algoma	3	2011, 2013, 2014
Hilbert	3	2008, 2011, 2012
Chilton	1	2012
Manitowoc Lutheran	1	2011
Roncalli	1	2013
Gibraltar	0	
Mishicot	0	
N.E.W. Lutheran	0	
Oconto	0	
Reedsville	0	
Sevastopol	0	
Southern Door	0	
St. Mary Catholic	0	
Sturgeon Bay	0	
Valders	0	
