= Across the Bay Conference =

Wisconsin high school football conference

The Across the Bay Conference is a high school football conference consisting of small high schools in northeastern Wisconsin. It was founded in 2022 and is affiliated with the Wisconsin Interscholastic Athletic Association.

== History ==
The Across the Bay Conference was formed in 2022 as part of the biannual realignment of Wisconsin's high school football conferences by the WIAA in conjunction with the Wisconsin Football Coaches Association. All eight original members (Algoma, Gibraltar, Gillett, Lena/St. Thomas Aquinas, NEW Lutheran/Oneida Nation/Providence Academy, Sevastopol, Suring and Wausaukee) were previously part of the Marinette & Oconto-Northern Lakes-Packerland Conference (MONLPC) eight-player football conference, with six of the eight members playing in the conference's East Division. It was originally called the Peninsula Conference because of its proximity to the Door Peninsula, a name that was previously used by an athletic conference that existed from 1933 to 1970 in northeastern Wisconsin. In 2024, the Peninsula name was dropped and the conference was rechristened the Across the Bay Conference. Wausaukee was shifted to the Northeast 8-Player Football Conference as part of the realignment.

For the 2026-27 competition cycle, the Across the Bay Conference is losing three schools (Gillett, Lena/St. Thomas Aquinas and Suring) to the Northeast 8-Player Football Conference, and the NEW Lutheran cooperative will be losing Oneida Nation to its own stand-alone football program. Two schools will be moving over from the Southeast 8-Player Football Conference (Elkhart Lake-Glenbeulah and Valley Christian in Oshkosh) to replace them, and the Across the Bay will be entering into a crossover scheduling alliance with the Northeast 8-Player Football Conference.

== List of conference members ==
=== Current members ===
School	Location	Affiliation	Enrollment	Mascot	Colors	Joined	Primary Conference
Algoma	Algoma, WI	Public	228	Wolves		2022	Packerland
Elkhart Lake-Glenbeulah	Elkhart Lake, WI	Public	146	Resorters		2026	Big East
Gibraltar	Fish Creek, WI	Public	154	Vikings		2022	Packerland
N.E.W. Lutheran/ Providence Academy	Green Bay, WI	Private (Lutheran), Private (Christian)	181	Blazers		2026	Packerland
Oneida Nation	Oneida, WI	Federal (Tribal)	156	Thunderhawks		2026	Marinette & Oconto
Sevastopol	Sturgeon Bay, WI	Public	180	Pioneers		2022	Packerland
Valley Christian	Oshkosh, WI	Private (Christian)	198	Warriors		2026	Trailways

=== Former members ===
School	Location	Affiliation	Mascot	Colors	Seasons	Primary Conference
Gillett	Gillett, WI	Public	Tigers		2022-2025	Marinette & Oconto
Lena/ St. Thomas Aquinas	Lena, WI	Public, Private (Catholic)	Titans		2022-2025	Marinette & Oconto
N.E.W. Lutheran/ Oneida Nation/ Providence Academy	Green Bay, WI	Private (Lutheran), Federal (Tribal), Private (Christian)	Blazers		2022-2025	Packerland, Marinette & Oconto
Suring	Suring, WI	Public	Eagles		2022-2025	Marinette & Oconto
Wausaukee	Wausaukee, WI	Public	Rangers		2022-2023	Marinette & Oconto

== List of conference champions ==
School	Quantity	Years
Lena/ St. Thomas Aquinas	2	2023, 2025
Algoma	1	2024
Gibraltar	1	2022
Valley Christian	1	2026
Suring	0	
Elkhart Lake-Glenbeulah	0	
Gillett	0	
N.E.W. Lutheran/ Providence Academy	0	
N.E.W. Lutheran/ Oneida Nation/ Providence Academy	0	
Oneida Nation	0	
Sevastopol	0	
Wausaukee	0	
