= Olympian Conference =

Wisconsin high school athletic conference (1970-2015)

The Olympian Conference is a former high school athletic conference with its members concentrated in east central Wisconsin. Formed in 1970 and dissolved in 2015, all conference members belonged to the Wisconsin Interscholastic Athletic Association.

== History ==
=== 1970–1999 ===
Location of Original Olympian Conference Members

The Olympian Conference was formed in 1970 by eight small- to medium-sized high schools in proximity to the Fox River Valley and Lake Winnebago in east central Wisconsin. Six of the original conference members previously competed in the Little Nine Conference (Brillion, Denmark, Freedom, Hilbert, Reedsville and Wrightstown), while one each came from the Eastern Wisconsin (Valders) and Peninsula (Mishicot) Conferences. The name of the conference was credited to a student at Mishicot High School after each school in the new conference suggested a name. Other finalists considered were the Inter-Lake Conference, Mid-Valley Conference and Packerland Conference (which would itself be used for a new conference that was inaugurated the same year as the Olympian). It was named so because the Olympics are considered the pinnacle of athletic competition. The Olympian Conference's first change in membership occurred in 1979, as Valders left to join a reconstituted Eastern Wisconsin Conference after a successful appeal against joining the Packerland Conference. Their stay in the newly-formed EWC was short-lived as they returned to the Olympian in 1980 to bring the circuit back to eight member schools. For football, Denmark and Mishicot swapped affiliations with Packerland members Gibraltar and Sevastopol, an arrangement that would last until the 1984 football season.

=== 1999–2015 ===
Location of Final Olympian Conference Members

The Olympian Conference's membership roster was remarkably stable for the first three decades of its existence, but major changes came in 1999 during a wave of realignment in east central Wisconsin. Denmark and Freedom, the two largest schools in the conference, left to join the Packerland Conference and Valley 8 Conference, respectively. They were replaced by three schools: Chilton (previously of the Eastern Wisconsin Conference), Manitowoc Lutheran (formerly a member of the Fox Valley Christian Conference) and St. Mary Catholic in Neenah (from the Midwest Classic Conference). Both Manitowoc Lutheran and St. Mary Catholic were new to the WIAA having recently joined as part of the merger with the Wisconsin Independent Schools Athletic Association (WISAA). The Olympian Conference would continue in this alignment for eight years before Roncalli in Manitowoc joined from the Eastern Wisconsin Conference in 2007. That same year, the Olympian entered into a football partnership with the Packerland Conference, creating the new seventeen-member Olympian-Packerland Conference. The Olympian Conference would be dissolved in 2015 as its five of its smallest members (Hilbert, Manitowoc Lutheran, Mishicot, Reedsville and St. Mary Catholic) would leave to join nine former Central Lakeshore Conference schools in forming the new Big East Conference. The Eastern Wisconsin Conference took four former Olympian schools into the fold (Brillion, Chilton, Roncalli and Valders), and Wrightstown would join the North Eastern Conference.

== Conference membership history ==
=== Final members ===
School	Location	Affiliation	Mascot	Colors	Joined	Left	Conference Joined	Current Conference
Brillion	Brillion, WI	Public	Lions		1970	2015	Eastern Wisconsin	
Chilton	Chilton, WI	Public	Tigers		1999	2015	Eastern Wisconsin	
Hilbert	Hilbert, WI	Public	Wolves		1970	2015	Big East	
Manitowoc Lutheran	Manitowoc, WI	Private (Lutheran, WELS)	Lancers		1999	2015	Big East	
Mishicot	Mishicot, WI	Public	Indians		1970	2015	Big East	
Reedsville	Reedsville, WI	Public	Panthers		1970	2015	Big East	
Roncalli	Manitowoc, WI	Private (Catholic)	Jets		2007	2015	Eastern Wisconsin	
St. Mary Catholic	Neenah, WI	Private (Catholic)	Zephyrs		1999	2015	Big East	
Valders	Valders, WI	Public	Vikings		1970, 1980	1979, 2015	Eastern Wisconsin	Eastern Wisconsin
Wrightstown	Wrightstown, WI	Public	Tigers		1970	2015	North Eastern	

=== Previous members ===
School	Location	Affiliation	Mascot	Colors	Joined	Left	Conference Joined	Current Conference
Denmark	Denmark, WI	Public	Vikings		1970	1999	Packerland	North Eastern
Freedom	Freedom, WI	Public	Irish		1970	1999	Valley Eight	North Eastern

=== Football-only members ===
School	Location	Affiliation	Mascot	Colors	Seasons	Primary Conference
Gibraltar	Fish Creek, WI	Public	Vikings		1979-1982	Packerland
Sevastopol	Sturgeon Bay, WI	Public	Pioneers		1979-1983	Packerland

== List of state champions ==
=== Fall sports ===
Boys Cross Country
School	Year	Division
Valders	1988	Class B
Valders	1989	Class B
Wrightstown	1992	Division 3

Football
School	Year	Division
Brillion	1984	Division 4
Hilbert	1989	Division 5
Hilbert	1994	Division 6
Hilbert	1996	Division 6
Wrightstown	1998	Division 5
Brillion	2003	Division 5
Brillion	2004	Division 5
Wrightstown	2006	Division 4

=== Winter sports ===
Boys Basketball
School	Year	Division
Denmark	1985	Class B
Freedom	1990	Class B
Brillion	2012	Division 3

Girls Basketball
School	Year	Division
St. Mary Catholic	2009	Division 4

Boys Wrestling
School	Year	Division
Freedom	1997	Division 2
Wrightstown	1999	Division 3
Wrightstown	2005	Division 3
Wrightstown	2006	Division 3

=== Spring sports ===
Boys Golf
School	Year	Division
Wrightstown	2002	Division 3
Roncalli	2009	Division 3

Girls Soccer
School	Year	Division
St. Mary Catholic	2007	Division 3

Softball
School	Year	Division
Denmark	1982	Class B
Denmark	1983	Class B
Denmark	1991	Division 2
Denmark	1997	Division 2

Girls Track & Field
School	Year	Division
Brillion	1993	Division 3
Hilbert	1995	Division 3
Wrightstown	2011	Division 2

== List of conference champions ==
=== Boys Basketball ===
School	Quantity	Years
Valders	13	1971, 1973, 1981, 1982, 1983, 1984, 1987, 1988, 1993, 1994, 2006, 2010, 2015
Brillion	10	1972, 1980, 1996, 1999, 2004, 2005, 2009, 2011, 2012, 2013
Freedom	7	1971, 1974, 1975, 1976, 1989, 1990, 1998
Manitowoc Lutheran	5	2000, 2001, 2002, 2003, 2007
Roncalli	5	2008, 2010, 2011, 2014, 2015
Wrightstown	5	1979, 1986, 1991, 1992, 2012
Denmark	4	1980, 1981, 1985, 1997
Reedsville	4	1976, 1977, 1978, 1995
Hilbert	1	2004
St. Mary Catholic	1	2005
Chilton	0	
Mishicot	0	

=== Girls Basketball ===
School	Quantity	Years
Hilbert	10	1976, 1977, 1981, 1982, 1988, 1989, 1990, 1992, 1998, 1999
Reedsville	6	1979, 1980, 1995, 1996, 2013, 2014
Brillion	4	1984, 2003, 2010, 2012
Denmark	4	1978, 1982, 1983, 1997
St. Mary Catholic	4	2000, 2001, 2005, 2007
Valders	4	1986, 1991, 2002, 2009
Mishicot	3	1993, 1994, 2006
Manitowoc Lutheran	2	2003, 2004
Roncalli	2	2008, 2015
Chilton	1	2011
Freedom	1	1985
Wrightstown	1	1987

=== Football ===
School	Quantity	Years
Wrightstown	11	1974, 1980, 1981, 1985, 1986, 1990, 1998, 2000, 2004, 2005, 2006
Hilbert	10	1976, 1982, 1985, 1988, 1989, 1990, 1992, 1994, 2001, 2003
Brillion	8	1971, 1973, 1975, 1979, 1982, 1983, 1984, 1995
Denmark	6	1970, 1977, 1978, 1986, 1987, 1996
Reedsville	3	1992, 1993, 1994
Freedom	2	1991, 1997
Valders	2	1993, 2002
Chilton	1	1999
Mishicot	1	1972
Gibraltar	0	
Manitowoc Lutheran	0	
Roncalli	0	
Sevastopol	0	
St. Mary Catholic	0	
