= General Fellows =

General Fellows may refer to:

- John Fellows (brigadier general) (1735–1808), Massachusetts Militia brigadier general in the American Revolutionary War
- Richard W. Fellows (1914–1998), U.S. Air Force brigadier general

== See also ==
- Attorney General Fellows (disambiguation)
