= General John and Mary Fellows Farmstead =

- U.S. National Register of Historic Places
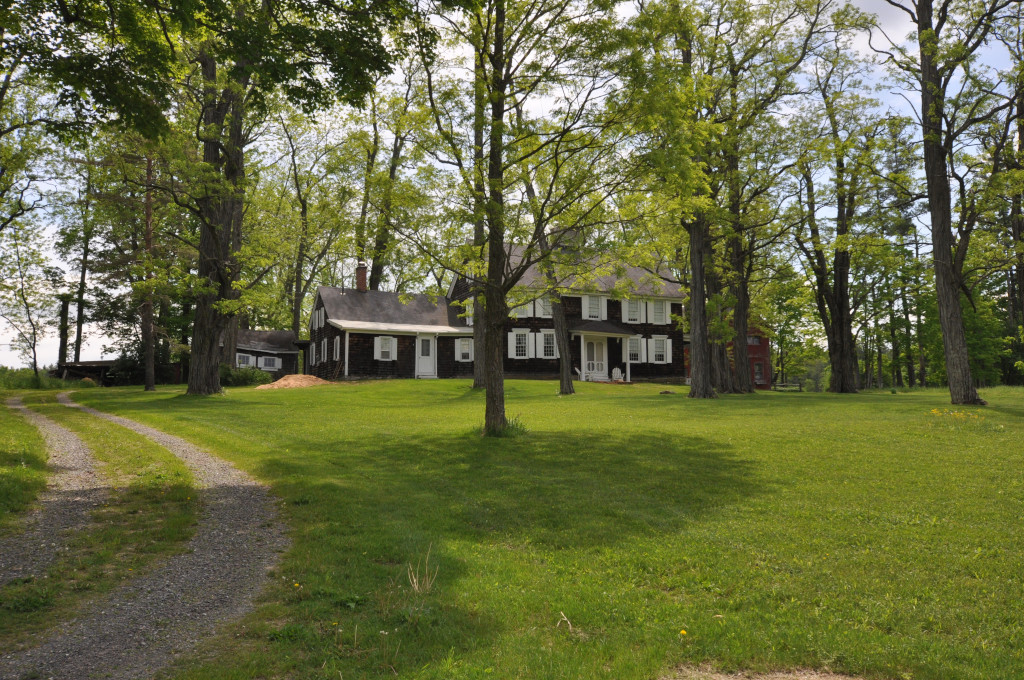

- Location within Massachusetts Location within the United States
- Location: 1601 Barnum Rd., Sheffield, Massachusetts
- Coordinates: 42°3′40″N 73°23′58″W
- Area: 125 acres (51 ha)
- Built: 1760s
- Architectural style: Georgian
- NRHP reference No.: 100002828
- Added to NRHP: August 28, 2018

The General John and Mary Fellows Farmstead is a historic farm property at 1601 Barnum Road in Sheffield, Massachusetts. Its farmhouse, dating to the 1760s, was home to American Revolutionary War general John Fellows. The property was listed on the National Register of Historic Places in 2018.

== Description and history ==
The Fellows Farmstead is located in a rural setting of southwestern Sheffield, on the east side of Barnum Road north of Foley Road. The property is 125 acres (51 ha) in size, a combination of open fields and woodlands. The main house is a single-pile 2 1/2-story wood-frame structure, with a gabled roof, central chimney, and clapboarded exterior. The rear roof face has a shallower pitch than the front, and extends down to the first floor, giving the house a classic New England saltbox profile. The rear leanto appears to be an integral part of the house's original construction. The main facade is three bays wide, with sash windows placed symmetrically around a wide center entrance. A single-story ell extends to the left side. The interior retains many original finishes, including carved moulding and paneling.

The house was long believed to have been built in 1737 for Captain John Fellows, who moved to the area from Pomfret, Connecticut. However, dendrochronological investigation as part of the National Register of Historic Places nomination determined the house dates to the 1760s. Captain Fellows' son John, who likely built the house, achieved notice as a leader of the Massachusetts militia during the American Revolutionary War, serving in the New York and New Jersey campaign under George Washington in 1776, and in the 1777 Saratoga campaign. At the time of its listing on the National Register in 2018, the property was still owned by descendants of the family who have owned it since the early 19th century.

== See also ==
- National Register of Historic Places listings in Berkshire County, Massachusetts
