= Peninsula Conference =

Wisconsin high school athletic conference (1933-1970)

The Peninsula Conference is a former high school athletic conference with its membership concentrated in northeastern Wisconsin. It was founded in 1933 and disbanded in 1970, and all public school members belonged to the Wisconsin Interscholastic Athletic Association.

== History ==
Location of Original Peninsula Conference Members

The Peninsula Conference was formed in 1933 by six small high schools in northeastern Wisconsin: Brussels, Casco, Gibraltar, Luxemburg, Mishicot and Sevastopol. It was named the Peninsula Conference because its six members were located in or near the Door Peninsula, and the conference featured schools from Door, Kewaunee and Manitowoc Counties. Because of its geography and lack of proximity to similarly-sized schools, conference membership remained relatively stable over the course of its history. In 1962, Brussels High School was replaced by Southern Door High School due to the consolidation of local school districts. Consolidation claimed another member of the conference in 1967 when Luxemburg and Casco merged to form Luxemburg-Casco High School. To keep membership at six schools, the Peninsula Conference added Manitowoc Lutheran, who were former members of the Kettle Moraine Conference. The Peninsula Conference would be realigned out of existence in 1970, as part of a larger realignment of high school conferences in northeastern Wisconsin. Three of the outgoing schools (Gibraltar, Manitowoc Lutheran and Sevastopol) formed the nucleus of the new Bay-Lakes Conference, two schools (Luxemburg-Casco and Southern Door) joined the new Packerland Conference and Mishicot became a charter member of the Olympian Conference.

== Conference membership history ==
=== Final members ===
School	Location	Affiliation	Mascot	Colors	Joined	Left	Conference Joined	Current Conference
Gibraltar	Fish Creek, WI	Public	Vikings		1933	1970	Bay-Lakes	Packerland
Luxemburg-Casco	Luxemburg, WI	Public	Spartans		1967	1970	Packerland	North Eastern
Manitowoc Lutheran	Manitowoc, WI	Private (Lutheran, WELS)	Lancers		1967	1970	Bay-Lakes	Big East
Mishicot	Mishicot, WI	Public	Indians		1933	1970	Olympian	Big East
Sevastopol	Sevastopol, WI	Public	Pioneers		1933	1970	Bay-Lakes	Packerland
Southern Door	Brussels, WI	Public	Eagles		1962	1970	Packerland	

=== Previous members ===
School	Location	Affiliation	Mascot	Colors	Joined	Left	Conference Joined	Current Conference
Brussels	Brussels, WI	Public	Broncos		1933	1962	Closed (replaced by Southern Door)	
Casco	Casco, WI	Public	Comets		1933	1967	Closed (consolidated into Luxemburg-Casco)	
Luxemburg	Luxemburg, WI	Public	Bluebirds		1933	1967	Closed (consolidated into Luxemburg-Casco)	

=== Football-only members ===
School	Location	Affiliation	Mascot	Colors	Seasons	Primary Conference
Sturgeon Bay "B"	Sturgeon Bay, WI	Public	Clippers		1936-1942	Northeastern Wisconsin

== List of conference champions ==
=== Boys Basketball ===
School	Quantity	Years
Casco	11	1944, 1945, 1946, 1947, 1948, 1949, 1953, 1954, 1957, 1962, 1964
Mishicot	9	1946, 1950, 1955, 1956, 1958, 1964, 1966, 1967, 1968
Gibraltar	8	1939, 1941, 1942, 1950, 1952, 1963, 1969, 1970
Luxemburg	7	1940, 1947, 1951, 1958, 1959, 1961, 1962
Brussels	2	1960, 1962
Sevastopol	2	1937, 1938
Southern Door	2	1965, 1967
Luxemburg-Casco	0	
Manitowoc Lutheran	0	

=== Football ===
School	Quantity	Years
Luxemburg	13	1941, 1944, 1945, 1946, 1948, 1950, 1951, 1954, 1955, 1957, 1958, 1961, 1962
Sevastopol	7	1939, 1940, 1942, 1952, 1953, 1960, 1965
Casco	5	1947, 1956, 1958, 1959, 1965
Mishicot	5	1949, 1963, 1965, 1966, 1969
Luxemburg-Casco	3	1967, 1968, 1969
Brussels	2	1954, 1958
Gibraltar	2	1965, 1969
Southern Door	2	1964, 1965
Manitowoc Lutheran	0	
Sturgeon Bay "B"	0	
Champions from 1936-1938 unknown
