= Packerland Conference =

Wisconsin high school athletic conference

The Packerland Conference is an athletic conference of high schools located in northeastern Wisconsin. Formed in 1970, the conference and its member schools are affiliated with the Wisconsin Interscholastic Athletic Association.

== History ==
=== 1970-1979 ===
Location of Original Packerland Conference Members

The Packerland Conference was founded in 1970 by ten small- to medium-sized high schools in northeastern Wisconsin. It started with a group informally referred to in the local media as the "Nuclear Five" (Algoma, Kewaunee, Luxemburg-Casco, Southern Door and Sturgeon Bay), which were the odd schools out during the flurry of conference realignment that took place in the region. Three Nuclear Five schools (Algoma, Kewaunee and Sturgeon Bay) were former members of the Northeastern Wisconsin Conference and two schools (Luxemburg-Casco and Southern Door) previously belonged to the Peninsula Conference, both of which ceased operations after the previous season. After an unsuccessful attempt to join the Bay Conference as a group, the Nuclear Five joined with five schools that were displaced by the ending of the Eastern Wisconsin Conference (Chilton, Kiel, New Holstein, Plymouth and Sheboygan Falls) to form the original roster of the Packerland Conference. Due to the large geographic footprint of its member schools, the conference was partitioned into Northern and Southern Divisions for most sports:

| Northern Division | Southern Division |
|---|---|
| Algoma | Chilton |
| Kewaunee | Kiel |
| Luxemburg-Casco | New Holstein |
| Southern Door | Plymouth |
| Sturgeon Bay | Sheboygan Falls |

=== 1979-2007 ===
In 1979, the five schools of the Southern Division, along with Two Rivers from the Fox Valley Association and Valders from the Olympian Conference, left the Packerland Conference to reform the Eastern Wisconsin Conference. Gibraltar and Sevastopol, two Door County high schools left without affiliation after the collapse of the Bay-Lakes Conference, replaced the five outgoing schools and the conference ended divisional play. The two Door County schools would not be members of the Packerland for football, however. They traded affiliations with Denmark and Mishicot of the Olympian Conference for five seasons before returning as a cooperative program in 1984. That same year, the conference expanded to nine schools when Oconto and Oconto Falls joined after leaving the Central Wisconsin Conference. Membership in the Packerland Conference remained stable for the next fifteen years before Oconto Falls left to become charter members of the Valley 8 Conference in 1999. Replacing them were former Olympian Conference members Denmark and Northeastern Wisconsin Lutheran, formerly of the Midwest Classic Conference.

=== 2007-present ===
In 2007, Denmark and Luxemburg-Casco exited the Packerland Conference for membership in the Bay Conference. The conference also entered into a partnership with the Olympian Conference to create the new Olympian-Packerland Conference for football. This arrangement ended when the Olympian was dissolved after the 2014-2015 school year, and the Packerland returned to football sponsorship with five members (Algoma, Kewaunee, Oconto, Southern Door and Sturgeon Bay). The Packerland Conference would continue with eight schools for ten years until Peshtigo left the Marinette & Oconto Conference to join in 2017, bringing the roster to its current total of nine schools. Football sponsorship was also ended that year, as the Packerland entered into a conglomeration with the Marinette & Oconto and Northern Lakes Conferences, forming the Marinette & Oconto-Northern Lakes-Packerland Conference (MONLPC).

=== Football (since 2020) ===
In February 2019, the WIAA and the Wisconsin Football Coaches Association released a sweeping football-only realignment for Wisconsin to start in 2020 with a two-year competition period between realignments. As part of this, the MONLPC Football Conference's two 11-player divisions were dissolved and the Packerland Conference was reinstated for football. Full members Kewaunee, Oconto, Peshtigo, Southern Door and Sturgeon Bay were part of the initial lineup, along with schools from the Big East Conference (Mishicot), the Central Wisconsin Conference (Bonduel), and the North Eastern Conference (Clintonville). Two years later, Clintonville left to join the Northwoods Football Conference with Marinette moving over from the North Eastern Conference as their replacement. This alignment remained in place through the 2024-2025 competition cycle. For the 2026-2027 cycle, Mishicot is slated to join their primary home in the Big East Conference with Oconto Falls leaving the Northwoods Football Conference to keep membership at eight schools.

== List of conference members ==
=== Current full members ===
| School | Location | Affiliation | Enrollment | Mascot | Colors | Joined |
|---|---|---|---|---|---|---|
| Algoma | Algoma, WI | Public | 228 | Wolves | | 1970 |
| Gibraltar | Fish Creek, WI | Public | 154 | Vikings | | 1979 |
| Kewaunee | Kewaunee, WI | Public | 278 | Storm | | 1970 |
| N.E.W. Lutheran | Green Bay, WI | Private (Lutheran, LCMS) | 124 | Blazers | | 1999 |
| Oconto | Oconto, WI | Public | 289 | Blue Devils | | 1984 |
| Peshtigo | Peshtigo, WI | Public | 346 | Bulldogs | | 2017 |
| Sevastopol | Sevastopol, WI | Public | 203 | Pioneers | | 1979 |
| Southern Door | Brussels, WI | Public | 296 | Eagles | | 1970 |
| Sturgeon Bay | Sturgeon Bay, WI | Public | 354 | Clippers | | 1970 |

=== Current associate members ===
| School | Location | Affiliation | Mascot | Colors | Primary Conference | Sport(s) |
|---|---|---|---|---|---|---|
| Bonduel | Bonduel, WI | Public | Bears | | Central Wisconsin | Football |
| Marinette | Marinette, WI | Public | Marines | | North Eastern | Football |
| Oconto Falls | Oconto Falls. WI | Public | Panthers | | North Eastern | Football |
| Providence Academy | Green Bay, WI | Private (Christian) | Paladins | | Independent | Boys Cross Country, Girls Cross Country, Girls Soccer |

=== Former members ===
| School | Location | Affiliation | Mascot | Colors | Joined | Left | Conference Joined | Current Conference |
|---|---|---|---|---|---|---|---|---|
| Chilton | Chilton, WI | Public | Tigers | | 1970 | 1979 | Eastern Wisconsin | |
| Denmark | Denmark, WI | Public | Vikings | | 1999 | 2007 | Bay | North Eastern |
| Kiel | Kiel, WI | Public | Raiders | | 1970 | 1979 | Eastern Wisconsin | |
| Luxemburg-Casco | Luxemberg, WI | Public | Spartans | | 1970 | 2007 | Bay | North Eastern |
| New Holstein | New Holstein, WI | Public | Huskies | | 1970 | 1979 | Eastern Wisconsin | |
| Oconto Falls | Oconto Falls, WI | Public | Panthers | | 1984 | 1999 | Valley 8 | North Eastern |
| Plymouth | Plymouth, WI | Public | Panthers | | 1970 | 1979 | Eastern Wisconsin | Glacier Trails |
| Sheboygan Falls | Sheboygan Falls, WI | Public | Falcons | | 1970 | 1979 | Eastern Wisconsin | |

=== Former football-only members ===
| School | Location | Affiliation | Mascot | Colors | Seasons | Primary Conference |
|---|---|---|---|---|---|---|
| Denmark | Denmark, WI | Public | Vikings | | 1979-1983 | Olympian |
| Mishicot | Mishicot, WI | Public | Indians | | 1979-1983, 2020-2025 | Olympian |

== Membership timeline ==
=== Full members ===
Northern Division Southern Division

== Membership map ==
Packerland Conference
Location of Packerland Conference full members:
1 Algoma
2 Gibraltar
3 Kewaunee
4 N.E.W. Lutheran
5 Oconto
6 Peshtigo
7 Sevastopol
8 Southern Door
9 Sturgeon Bay

== Sponsored sports ==
| | Baseball | Boys Basketball | Girls Basketball | Boys Cross Country | Girls Cross Country | Football | Boys Golf | Boys Soccer | Girls Soccer | Softball | Boys Track & Field | Girls Track & Field | Girls Volleyball | Boys Wrestling | Girls Wrestling |
|---|---|---|---|---|---|---|---|---|---|---|---|---|---|---|---|
| Algoma | ● | ● | ● | ● | ● | | | ● | | ● | ● | ● | ● | | |
| Gibraltar | ● (Note: Co-operative with Washington Island) | ● | ● | ● | ● | | ● | ● (Note: Co-operative with Sevastopol) | | ● | ● | ● | ● | | |
| Kewaunee | ● | ● | ● | ● | ● | ● | ● | ● | ● | | ● | ● | ● | ● | ● |
| N.E.W. Lutheran | ● (Note: Co-operative with Providence Academy) | ● | ● | | | | ● | ● | | ● | ● | ● | ● | | |
| Oconto | ● | ● | ● | ● | ● | ● | ● | | | ● | ● | ● | ● | ● | ● |
| Peshtigo | ● | ● | ● | ● | ● | ● | ● | ● | ● | ● | ● | ● | ● | ● | ● |
| Sevastopol | ● | ● | ● | ● | ● | | ● | | ● (Note: Co-operative with Gibraltar) | ● | ● | ● | ● | | |
| Southern Door | ● | ● | ● | ● | ● | ● | ● | | | ● | ● | ● | ● | ● | ● |
| Sturgeon Bay | ● | ● | ● | ● | ● | ● | ● | ● | ● | ● | ● | ● | ● | ● | ● (Note: Co-operative with Gibraltar and Sevastopol) |

== List of state champions ==
=== Fall sports ===
Boys Cross Country
| School | Year | Division |
|---|---|---|
| Sturgeon Bay | 2001 | Division 2 |

Girls Cross Country
| School | Year | Division |
|---|---|---|
| Luxemburg-Casco | 1982 | Class B |
| Luxemburg-Casco | 1987 | Class B |
| Luxemburg-Casco | 1989 | Class B |
| Gibraltar | 1994 | Division 3 |
| Gibraltar | 1995 | Division 3 |
| Luxemburg-Casco | 1998 | Division 2 |
| Luxemburg-Casco | 2000 | Division 3 |
| Sevastopol | 2006 | Division 3 |

Football
| School | Year | Division |
|---|---|---|
| Plymouth | 1976 | Division 3 |
| Plymouth | 1978 | Division 3 |
| Southern Door | 1989 | Division 4 |
| Oconto Falls | 1997 | Division 3 |
| Sturgeon Bay | 2004 | Division 4 |

Boys Soccer
| School | Year | Division |
|---|---|---|
| Sturgeon Bay | 2015 | Division 4 |
| Sturgeon Bay | 2019 | Division 4 |

Girls Swimming & Diving
| School | Year | Division |
|---|---|---|
| Sturgeon Bay/ Sevastopol | 2009 | Division 2 |

Girls Volleyball
| School | Year | Division |
|---|---|---|
| Sevastopol | 1984 | Class C |
| Sevastopol | 1991 | Division 3 |

=== Winter sports ===
Boys Basketball
| School | Year | Division |
|---|---|---|
| Sheboygan Falls | 1974 | Class B |
| Sheboygan Falls | 1975 | Class B |

Girls Basketball
| School | Year | Division |
|---|---|---|
| Algoma | 1981 | Class B |
| Algoma | 1986 | Class C |
| Luxemburg-Casco | 1988 | Class B |
| Luxemburg-Casco | 1994 | Division 2 |
| Luxemburg-Casco | 2004 | Division 2 |
| Kewaunee | 2012 | Division 3 |
| Algoma | 2013 | Division 4 |
| Kewaunee | 2013 | Division 3 |

Boys Swimming & Diving
| School | Year | Division |
|---|---|---|
| Sturgeon Bay/ Southern Door | 2003 | Division 2 |
| Sturgeon Bay/ Southern Door | 2004 | Division 2 |
| Sturgeon Bay/ Southern Door | 2005 | Division 2 |
| Sturgeon Bay | 2006 | Division 2 |

Boys Wrestling
| School | Year | Division |
|---|---|---|
| Luxemburg-Casco | 1992 | Division 2 |
| Luxemburg-Casco | 1994 | Division 2 |
| Luxemburg-Casco | 1996 | Division 2 |
| Luxemburg-Casco | 1999 | Division 2 |
| Luxemburg-Casco | 2001 | Division 2 |
| Luxemburg-Casco | 2002 | Division 2 |
| Luxemburg-Casco | 2003 | Division 2 |
| Luxemburg-Casco | 2005 | Division 2 |
| Luxemburg-Casco | 2006 | Division 2 |

=== Spring sports ===
Baseball
| School | Year | Division |
|---|---|---|
| Algoma | 1983 | Class B |
| Sevastopol | 1985 | Class C |
| Sturgeon Bay | 1991 | Division 2 |
| Oconto | 2013 | Division 3 |

Softball
| School | Year | Division |
|---|---|---|
| Luxemburg-Casco | 1982 | Class B |
| Southern Door | 1992 | Division 2 |
| Southern Door | 1994 | Division 2 |
| Sevastopol | 2007 | Division 3 |
| Sevastopol | 2008 | Division 3 |
| Algoma | 2013 | Division 4 |

Boys Track & Field
| School | Year | Division |
|---|---|---|
| Sheboygan Falls | 1975 | Class B |
| Southern Door | 1993 | Division 2 |

Girls Track & Field
| School | Year | Division |
|---|---|---|
| Sturgeon Bay | 1972 | Class B |
| Algoma | 2017 | Division 3 |

=== Summer sports ===
Baseball
| School | Year |
|---|---|
| Sheboygan Falls | 1973 |

== List of conference champions ==
=== Boys Basketball ===
| School | Quantity | Years |
|---|---|---|
| Southern Door | 15 | 1984, 1985, 1997, 1998, 2008, 2015, 2016, 2017, 2018, 2019, 2020, 2021, 2023, 2024, 2025 |
| Sturgeon Bay | 13 | 1981, 1982, 1986, 1988, 1989, 1992, 1993, 1999, 2000, 2003, 2004, 2005, 2012 |
| Luxemburg-Casco | 9 | 1974, 1979, 1980, 1983, 1988, 1991, 2002, 2005, 2006 |
| Kewaunee | 7 | 1971, 1973, 1990, 1996, 2020, 2022, 2026 |
| N.E.W. Lutheran | 5 | 2001, 2011, 2012, 2013, 2014 |
| Algoma | 4 | 1975, 1992, 2006, 2007 |
| Oconto | 3 | 1987, 2009, 2010 |
| Oconto Falls | 3 | 1991, 1994, 1995 |
| New Holstein | 2 | 1976, 1977 |
| Plymouth | 2 | 1974, 1978 |
| Sheboygan Falls | 2 | 1972, 1975 |
| Denmark | 1 | 2007 |
| Kiel | 1 | 1974 |
| Peshtigo | 1 | 2022 |
| Chilton | 0 | |
| Gibraltar | 0 | |
| Sevastopol | 0 | |

=== Girls Basketball ===
| School | Quantity | Years |
|---|---|---|
| Algoma | 18 | 1979, 1980, 1981, 1982, 1983, 1984, 1985, 1986, 2007, 2008, 2009, 2010, 2011, 2012, 2013, 2014, 2015, 2016 |
| Kewaunee | 14 | 1989, 1990, 1991, 1992, 2011, 2012, 2013, 2017, 2019, 2020, 2021, 2024, 2025, 2026 |
| Luxemburg-Casco | 14 | 1987, 1988, 1994, 1995, 1996, 1997, 1998, 2000, 2001, 2002, 2003, 2004, 2005, 2007 |
| Sturgeon Bay | 6 | 1975, 1976, 1977, 1993, 2006, 2007 |
| Southern Door | 5 | 1978, 1982, 1992, 2008, 2018 |
| Sevastopol | 3 | 2006, 2023, 2024 |
| Oconto | 2 | 1999, 2022 |
| New Holstein | 1 | 1977 |
| Chilton | 0 | |
| Denmark | 0 | |
| Gibraltar | 0 | |
| Kiel | 0 | |
| N.E.W. Lutheran | 0 | |
| Oconto Falls | 0 | |
| Peshtigo | 0 | |
| Plymouth | 0 | |
| Sheboygan Falls | 0 | |

=== Football ===
| School | Quantity | Years |
|---|---|---|
| Kewaunee | 14 | 1970, 1971, 1975, 1983, 1986, 1991, 1996, 2000, 2001, 2002, 2006, 2021, 2023, 2025 |
| Southern Door | 10 | 1986, 1990, 1991, 1992, 1997, 1998, 2000, 2015, 2016, 2022 |
| Luxemburg-Casco | 6 | 1988, 1989, 2000, 2003, 2004, 2005 |
| Oconto Falls | 5 | 1984, 1986, 1987, 1995, 1998 |
| Algoma | 4 | 1974, 1982, 1992, 1994 |
| Denmark | 4 | 1979, 1980, 1999, 2000 |
| Plymouth | 4 | 1972, 1976, 1977, 1978 |
| Bonduel | 3 | 2020, 2024, 2026 |
| Oconto | 2 | 1985, 1986 |
| Sturgeon Bay | 2 | 1986, 1993 |
| Chilton | 1 | 1970 |
| Mishicot | 1 | 1981 |
| Sheboygan Falls | 1 | 1973 |
| Clintonville | 0 | |
| Kiel | 0 | |
| Marinette | 0 | |
| New Holstein | 0 | |
| Peshtigo | 0 | |
| Sevastopol | 0 | |
| Sevastopol/ Gibraltar | 0 | |
