= Algoma School District =

School district in Wisconsin, United States

The Algoma School District is a school district serving the area around the city of Algoma in Kewaunee County, Wisconsin. It covers approximately 68 square miles in the northeasternmost section of the county.

The school district consists of two schools: Algoma High School and Algoma Elementary School.

The school mascot is the Wolf and its colors are Gold and Black.

== History ==
The Algoma School District was organized in 1876 with the building of its first school house, located on the corner of Fremont and Sixth Street, in front of what is now the Algoma Elementary School, in 1876. The small two-story building had a large cupola on top.

In 1905, a major addition was added in front of this building, doubling its size. By the Great Depression, though, the building was in disrepair due to poor upkeep practices.

As part of the Public Works Administration program instituted by the Franklin D. Roosevelt Administration, Algoma was eligible for help in building a new Grade and high school in 1934. Features of this new building included an ornate auditorium; a full-court gymnasium; a kindergarten room with functioning fireplace and child-sized bathroom; and a music room with soundproofing.

In 1955, a wing was added to this building to accommodate the increasing enrollment due to the number of school district consolidations that were happening during this time. The wing included new classrooms for the teaching of business education, home economics, agriculture and English. This addition is prominent, as the original building was done in dark stain and the addition was wood stained in blond.

In 1966, the voters of the district decided to build a new high school on a plat of farmland then located to the south of Algoma with the stipulation that no more than $1.5 million was spent on the new structure. This new building opened in the fall of 1969 with the old high school becoming an elementary school and the remaining rural schoolhouses closed, either to be sold or eventually demolished.

In 1997, a referendum was passed to renovate the high school and elementary school to meet Title X requirements. The high school was fitted with a new weightlifting room to replace the old one that had become part of the girls' locker room and the elementary school had an addition to replace older locker rooms.

In 2014, permits were granted for the District to build a new community center and tech center to be attached to the current high school. The construction is planned to be completed December 19, 2014.

== Cities and Towns that the Algoma School District has or currently serves over the years ==
- City of Algoma
- Town of Ahnapee
- Town of Casco (1)
- Town of Lincoln (1)
- Town of Pierce (2)
- Town of Clay Banks (Door County) (3)
- Town of Forestville (Door County) (3) (4)
- Village of Forestville (Door County) (3)
- Town of Nasewaupee (Door County) (3)

(1) Eastern section of towns joined Algoma in 1966 after the Casco School District voted to dissolve and consolidate with the Luxemburg School District to form Luxemburg-Casco (L-C) School District.

(2) North 1/3 of town only.

(3) Left Algoma when the towns voted in 1960 to consolidate with the Door County Towns of Brussels, Union and Gardner to form Southern Door School District out of the former Brussels School District with classes beginning in the fall of 1962.

(4) Joined Algoma in 1948 when the town's school district dissolved.
