= Casey Rabach =

American football player (born 1977)

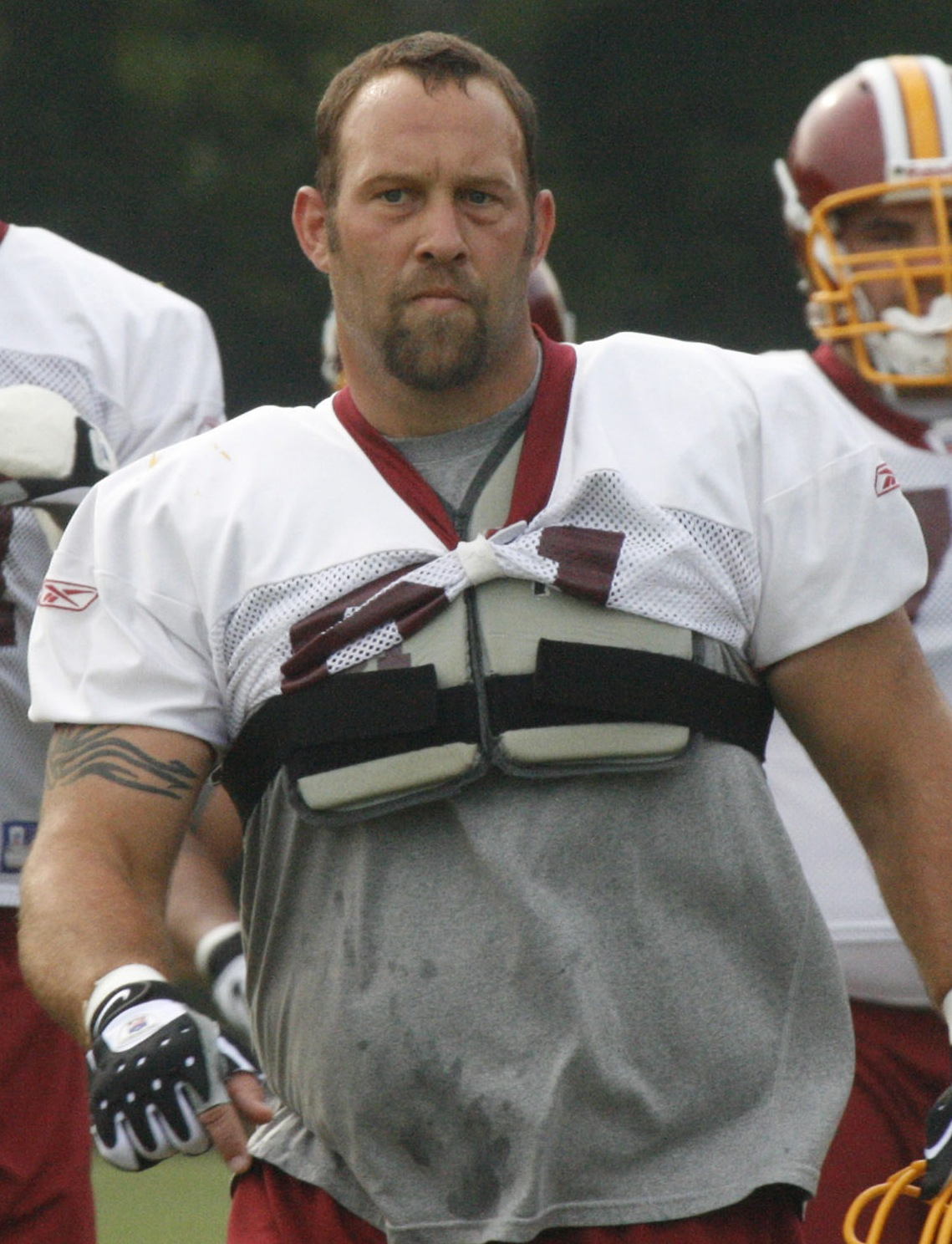
- Rabach during Redskins training camp

Wisconsin Badgers
- Position: Director of scouting

Personal information
- Born: September 24, 1977 (age 49); Sturgeon Bay, Wisconsin, U.S.
- Listed height: 6 ft 4 in (1.93 m)
- Listed weight: 292 lb (132 kg)

Career information
- High school: Sturgeon Bay
- College: Wisconsin (1996–2000)
- NFL draft: 2001: 3rd round, 92nd overall pick

Career history
- Baltimore Ravens (2001–2004); Washington Redskins (2005–2010); Baltimore Ravens (2011)*
- * Offseason or practice squad member only

Awards and highlights
- Third-team All-American (2000); 2× First-team All-Big Ten (1999, 2000); Second-team All-Big Ten (1998)

Career NFL statistics
- Games played: 137
- Games started: 118
- Fumble recoveries: 1
- Stats at Pro Football Reference

Casey Edward Rabach (/rəˈbɑːk/; born September 24, 1977) is an American former professional football player who was a center in the National Football League (NFL). He was selected by the Baltimore Ravens in the third round of the 2001 NFL draft, and also played professionally for the Washington Redskins. He played college football for the Wisconsin Badgers.

== Early life ==
Rabach attended Sturgeon Bay High School in Sturgeon Bay, Wisconsin and then played college football at the University of Wisconsin–Madison.

== Professional career ==
=== Baltimore Ravens ===
Rabach was selected in the third round of the 2001 NFL draft (92nd overall) by the Baltimore Ravens. By the 2003 season he was the starting center for the team.

=== Washington Redskins ===
Before the 2005 NFL season, Rabach left Baltimore as a free agent for the Washington Redskins. He immediately became the starting center for the Redskins, replacing Cory Raymer. That year, he started all 16 games. The following year, Rabach was plagued by a broken left hand in the back half of the season. Rabach signed a three-year contract with them in March 2010, worth $12.3 million before being released a year later, playing in and starting 95 of 96 possible games. Upon his release, teammates noted his leadership as the Redskins moved towards youth at the offensive line with Kory Lichtensteiger and Will Montgomery.

Later, Rabach drew interest from the Baltimore Ravens and Cincinnati Bengals.

=== Baltimore Ravens (second stint) ===
On August 3, 2011, the Baltimore Ravens had agreed with Rabach to a potential two-year deal to add center depth behind Matt Birk and guard depth after Chris Chester left for the Redskins. Rabach later failed his team physical due to lingering concerns related to off-season shoulder surgery, being told he needed two to three weeks' more time, and did not join the roster.

== Personal life ==
Rabach is the cousin of brothers Chris Greisen, a former NFL and Arena Football League player, and Nick Greisen, who last played in the NFL for the Denver Broncos.

After his playing career, Rabach started the Fifth Quarter Foundation in his native Door County, Wisconsin to help improve the quality of youth sports in the area.
