= Attorney General Fellows =

Attorney General Fellows may refer to:

- Grant Fellows (1865–1929), Attorney General of Michigan
- Raymond Fellows (1885–1957), Attorney General of Maine
- Thomas Howard Fellows (1822–1878), Attorney General of Victoria

== See also ==
- General Fellows (disambiguation)
