= Little Sturgeon, Wisconsin =

Census-designated place in Wisconsin, United States

- Census-designated place
- Location within the state of Wisconsin
- Coordinates: 44°50′20″N 87°33′45″W
- Country: United States
- State: Wisconsin
- County: Door
- Town: Gardner

Area
  - Total: 2.335 sq mi (6.05 km^{2})
  - Land: 2.335 sq mi (6.05 km^{2})
  - Water: 0 sq mi (0 km^{2})
- Elevation: 600 ft (183 m)

Population (2020)
  - Total: 177
  - Density: 75.8/sq mi (29.3/km^{2})
- Time zone: UTC-6 (Central (CST))
  - Summer (DST): UTC-5 (CDT)
- Area code: 920
- GNIS feature ID: 1568432

Little Sturgeon is a census-designated place located on the Little Sturgeon Bay, in the town of Gardner, in Door County, Wisconsin, United States. As of the 2020 census, Little Sturgeon had a population of 177. Little Sturgeon has an annual festival known as "Little Sturgeon Days" that features a parade and other live entertainment.

== Climate ==
Henderson Point (along Little Sturgeon Bay, north of the community)

Climate chart (precipitation, max. and min. temperature)
J	F	M	A	M	J	J	A	S	O	N	D
55 −4 −12	56 −2 −11	62 4 −6	115 11 1	94 13 6	108 18 11	113 22 17	97 19 15	93 19 16	119 12 5	79 8 4	56 −1 −2
- █ Average max. and min. temperatures in °C
- █ Precipitation totals in mm
Imperial conversion
J	F	M	A	M	J	J	A	S	O	N	D
2.2 25 10	2.2 28 12	2.4 39 21	4.5 52 34	3.7 55 43	4.3 64 52	4.4 72 63	3.8 66 59	3.7 66 61	4.7 54 41	3.1 46 39	2.2 30 28
- █ Average max. and min. temperatures in °F
- █ Precipitation totals in inches
