= Bay-Lakes Conference =

Wisconsin high school athletic conference (1970-1979)

The Bay-Lakes Conference is a former high school athletic conference in northeast Wisconsin, operating from 1970 to 1979. Its public school members belonged to the Wisconsin Interscholastic Athletic Association and its private school members were part of the Wisconsin Independent Schools Athletic Association.

== History ==
Location of Bay-Lakes Conference Members (1970–1976)

The Bay-Lakes Conference, named so for its proximity to Green Bay and the many lakes in northeastern Wisconsin, was formed in 1970 by a mix of seven small public and private schools in the region. Six of the seven schools were members of conferences that had disbanded prior to the 1970-71 school year: three from the Peninsula Conference (Gibraltar, Manitowoc Lutheran and Sevastopol), two from the Fox Valley Tri-County League (St. Lawrence Seminary and Winnebago Lutheran) and one from the Wisconsin Seminary League (Sacred Heart Seminary). Stockbridge, the seventh member, was an independent prior to joining the conference, as they had competed without affiliation since the demise of the Kettle Moraine Conference in 1969. The conference kept the same membership over the course of its nine-year history with the exception of Sacred Heart Seminary's exit in 1976 due to its closing. The Bay-Lakes Conference split up in 1979 with two public high schools moving to the Packerland Conference (Gibraltar and Sevastopol), two private schools joining the Classic Conference (St. Lawrence Seminary and Winnebago Lutheran), Stockbridge joined the Central Lakeshore Conference and Manitowoc Lutheran became an independent.

== Conference membership history ==
=== Final members ===
School	Location	Affiliation	Mascot	Colors	Joined	Left	Conference Joined	Current Conference
Gibraltar	Fish Creek, WI	Public	Vikings		1970	1979	Packerland	
Manitowoc Lutheran	Manitowoc, WI	Private (Lutheran, WELS)	Lancers		1970	1979	Independent	Big East
Sevastopol	Sevastopol, WI	Public	Pioneers		1970	1979	Packerland	
St. Lawrence Seminary	Mount Calvary, WI	Private (Catholic, Capuchin)	Hilltoppers		1970	1979	Classic	Wisconsin Flyway
Stockbridge	Stockbridge, WI	Public	Indians		1970	1979	Central Lakeshore	Independent
Winnebago Lutheran	Fond du Lac, WI	Private (Lutheran, WELS)	Vikings		1970	1979	Classic	Wisconsin Flyway

=== Previous members ===
School	Location	Affiliation	Mascot	Colors	Joined	Left	Conference Joined	Current Conference
Sacred Heart Seminary	Oneida, WI	Private (Catholic)	Scouts		1970	1976	Closed in 1976	

== Membership timeline ==
Non-football member

== List of state champions ==
=== Fall sports ===
Boys Cross Country
School	Year	Division
St. Lawrence Seminary	1975	WISAA Class B
St. Lawrence Seminary	1977	WISAA Class B

=== Winter sports ===
None

=== Spring sports ===
Baseball
School	Year	Division
Gibraltar	1979	Class C

Girls Track & Field
School	Year	Division
Winnebago Lutheran	1978	WISAA Class B
Winnebago Lutheran	1979	WISAA Class B

== List of conference champions ==
=== Boys Basketball ===
School	Quantity	Years
Sevastopol	4	1975, 1976, 1978, 1979
Winnebago Lutheran	4	1971, 1972, 1973, 1977
Gibraltar	1	1974
Manitowoc Lutheran	1	1974
Sacred Heart Seminary	0	
St. Lawrence Seminary	0	
Stockbridge	0	

=== Girls Basketball ===
School	Quantity	Years
Winnebago Lutheran	2	1978, 1979
Gibraltar	0	
Manitowoc Lutheran	0	
Sevastopol	0	
Stockbridge	0	

=== Football ===
School	Quantity	Years
Manitowoc Lutheran	4	1975, 1976, 1977, 1978
Gibraltar	2	1973, 1974
Sevastopol	2	1970, 1976
St. Lawrence Seminary	2	1972, 1976
Winnebago Lutheran	2	1970, 1971
Stockbridge	0	
