= Anna Augusta Von Helmholtz-Phelan =

American university professor, author, speaker, poet and social activist

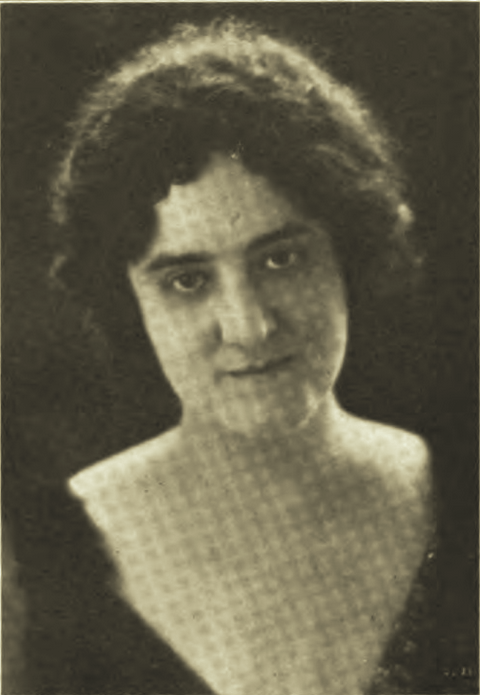
- Born: Anna Augusta Von Helmholtz; September 22, 1880; Sturgeon Bay, Wisconsin, U.S.
- Died: January 10, 1964 (aged 83); Hennepin, Minnesota, U.S.
- Other name: Anna Phelan
- Education: University of Wisconsin
- Occupations: educator; author
- Employer: University of Minnesota
- Spouse: Raymond V. Phelan (m. 1908)
- Relatives: Hermann von Helmholtz (grand-uncle)

Anna Augusta Von Helmholtz-Phelan (September 22, 1880 – January 10, 1964) was an American university professor, author, speaker, poet, and social activist. For more than four decades she taught English and creative writing at the University of Minnesota, with a specialty in short stories, before retiring in 1949 as assistant professor emerita of English. Phelan was the author of The Indebtedness of Samuel Taylor Coleridge to August Wilhelm von Schlegel (1907; originally presented as the author's M.A. thesis, University of Wisconsin, 1905), The Social Ideals of William Morris (originally presented as the author's Ph.D. thesis, University of Wisconsin, 1908), "The Staging of the Court Drama to 1595" (1909), and The Social Philosophy of William Morris (1927). A collection of her poetry was published in The Crystal Cup (1949), the royalties of which established the Anna Augusta Von Helmholtz-Phelan Award for Creative Writing at the University of Minnesota.

== Early life and education ==
Anna Augusta Von Helmholtz was born at Sturgeon Bay, Wisconsin, on September 22, 1880. She was the daughter of Otto Wilhelm and Albertine Henriette von Helmholtz and a grand-niece of the distinguished physicist Hermann von Helmholtz.

Phelan attended Sturgeon Bay High School before enrolling at the University of Wisconsin, where she was inducted into Phi Beta Kappa in her junior year. At Madison she received her A. B. degree with honors in 1905; an A. M. in 1906 as a Mary M. Adams Fellow in English literature; and a Ph.D. in 1908 while serving as an assistant instructor. Her studies also took her abroad to the University of Oxford, the Sorbonne, and the University of Berlin.

== Career ==
Phelan joined the faculty of the University of Minnesota in 1908, first as an instructor in rhetoric and in 1914, as an assistant professor of English. She served as the faculty advisor to several university organizations, such as the Women's Athletic Council, the Women's League, the Equal Suffrage Club, the Social Problems Club, and The Players. During her teaching career, Phelan also lectured at St. Catherine's College, the Georgetown Visitation Convent, and the University of Berlin. After retiring from the University of Minnesota in 1949, Phelan continued teaching creative writing privately.

Phelan was active in the suffrage movement, the promotion of dramatics, and social betterment. Her professional and civic activities included being a member of the Woman's Club of Minneapolis and the state committee to determine minimum wages as well as several Minneapolis committees, including those for social and vocational surveys, a child welfare exhibit, organizing the Women's Welfare League, and the mayor's committee on service men's employment. She served as chair of the committee on laws affecting working women (1910–11), the department of social economics (1911–13), the Minnesota Speakers' Bureau, and the Council of National Defense. She was a delegate to the American Civic Association, National Conservation Congresses, and the 1911 National Social Center Conference held in Madison, Wisconsin.

== Personal life ==
On August 10, 1908, in Chicago, she married Raymond V. Phelan.

Phelan was a cat lover; she owned several Persian cats. In politics, she was a Republican.

Anna Augusta Von Helmholtz-Phelan died at Hennepin, Minnesota, on January 10, 1964.

== Legacy ==
At the University of Minnesota, Phelan established the Anna Augusta Von Helmholtz-Phelan Award for Creative Writing from the royalties of her poetry book, The Crystal Cup. Phelan's students established the Anna Augusta Von Helmholtz Phelan Scholarship in Creative Writing.

== Selected works ==
- The Indebtedness of Samuel Taylor Coleridge to August Wilhelm von Schlegel (Madison, M.A. thesis, 1907)
- The Social Ideals of William Morris (Madison, Ph.D. thesis, 1908)
- "The Staging of the Court Drama to 1595", PMLA vol. 24, no. 2 (1909), pp. 185–206.
- The Social Philosophy of William Morris (Durham: Duke University Press, 1927)
- The Crystal Cup (Minneapolis: Delta Phi Lambda, 1949)
