= Garth Neustadter =

American composer (born 1986)

- Born: Garth Neustadter; 4 May 1986 (age 40); Green Bay, WI, United States
- Genres: Film score, concert Music
- Occupations: Film composer, concert music composer, record producer
- Instruments: Violin, piano, saxophone, voice
- Years active: 2007–present
- Label: GKN Studios
- Website: www.garthneustadter.com

Garth Neustadter (born May 4, 1986, in Green Bay, Wisconsin) is an American composer and multi-instrumentalist.

== Early life and education ==
Neustadter began studying the violin and piano at the age of four, later undertaking saxophone and voice studies. He completed undergraduate degrees in violin and voice performance at Lawrence University and went on to study composition at the Yale School of Music.

Neustadter is a 2005 graduate of Manitowoc Lutheran High School.

== Career ==
In 2007, Neustadter was selected by veteran film composer Hans Zimmer as the winner of the Turner Classic Movies Young Film Composers Competition. He subsequently composed feature-length scores for Turner Classic Movies, Warner Bros., and PBS.

In 2011, Neustadter received a Primetime Emmy Award for his score for the PBS American Masters documentary, "John Muir in the New World".

In 2015, Garth played at the Capitol Civic Centre in Manitowoc in the Garth Neustadter Trio with his mom and dad.

== Awards ==
- 2007 - Winner of the Turner Classic Movies Young Film Composers Competition
- 2010 - ASCAP Morton Gould Award recipient
- 2011 - Primetime Emmy Award winner for Outstanding Music Composition for a Series - American Masters: John Muir in the New World
- 2011 - ASCAP Young Jazz Composer Award recipient
