= Valders, Wisconsin =

- Village
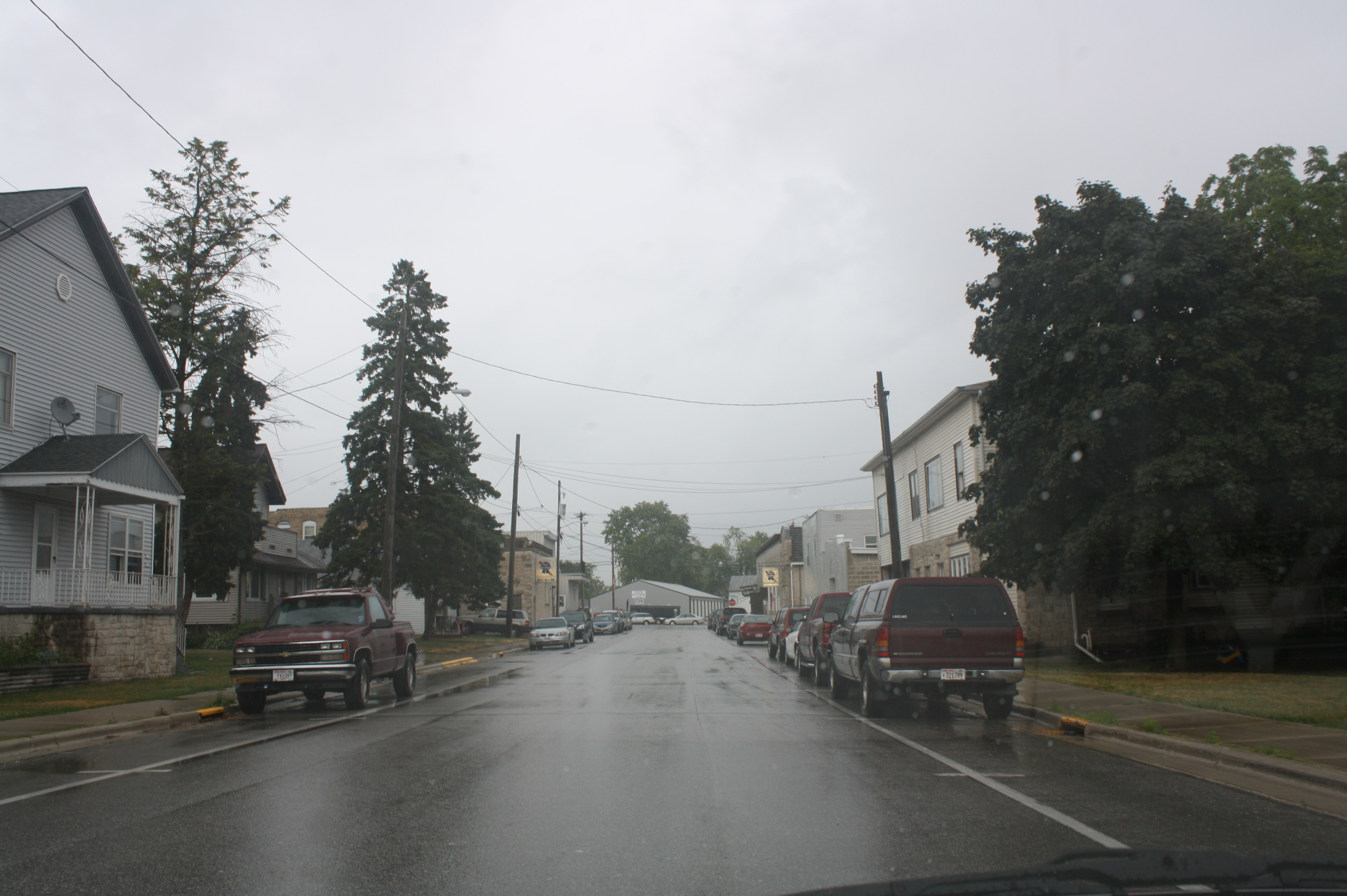
- Looking east at downtown Valders

- Location of Valders in Manitowoc County, Wisconsin
- Coordinates: 44°03′58″N 87°53′03″W
- Country: United States
- State: Wisconsin
- County: Manitowoc

Area
  - Total: 1.44 sq mi (3.73 km^{2})
  - Land: 1.44 sq mi (3.73 km^{2})
  - Water: 0.0039 sq mi (0.01 km^{2})
- Elevation: 833 ft (254 m)

Population (2020)
  - Total: 952
  - Density: 661/sq mi (255/km^{2})
- Time zone: UTC-6 (Central (CST))
  - Summer (DST): UTC-5 (CDT)
- Area code: 920
- FIPS code: 55-82200
- GNIS feature ID: 1576014
- Website: www.valders.org

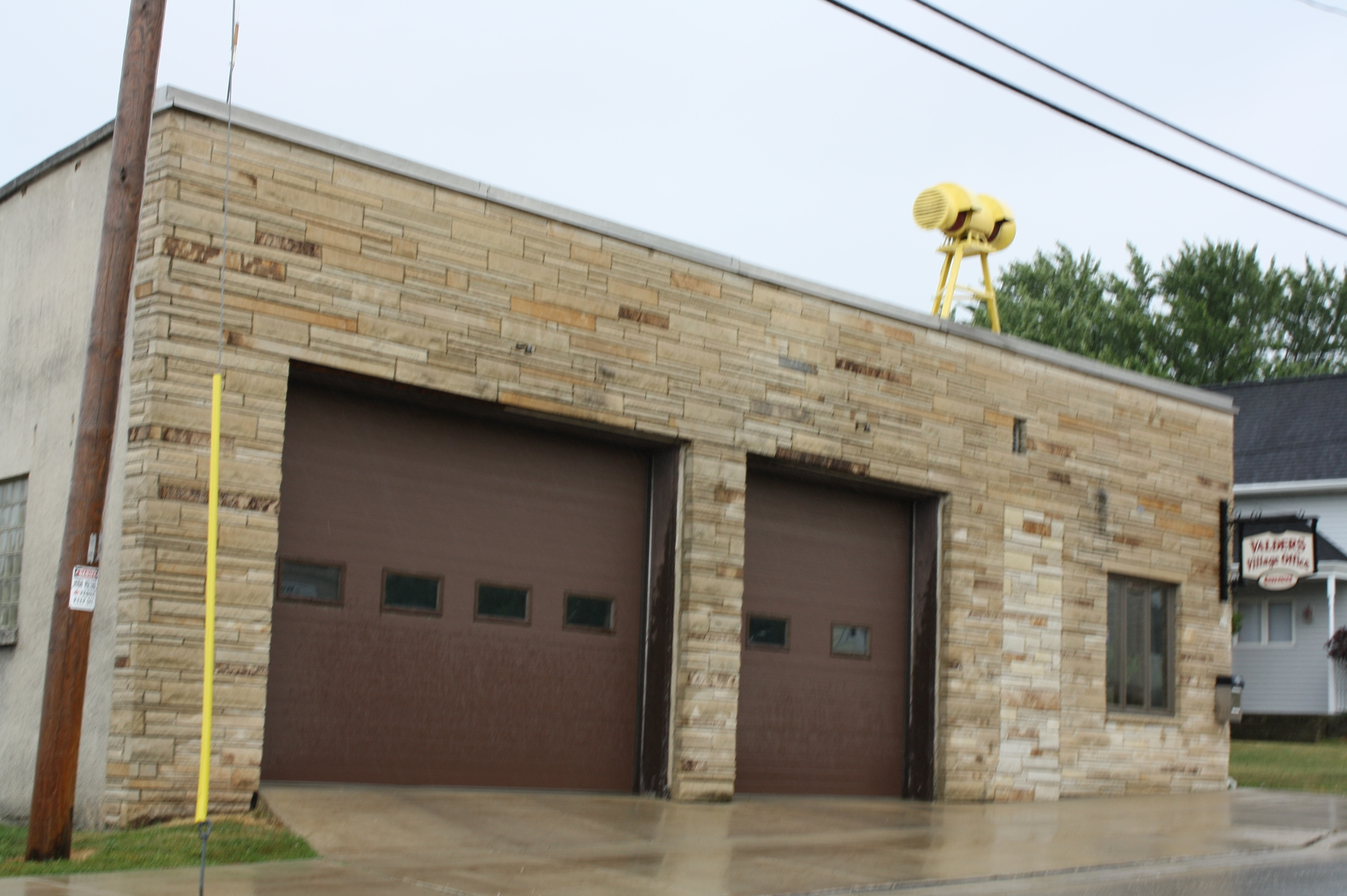
Village hall

Valders is a village in Manitowoc County, Wisconsin, United States. The population was 952 at the 2020 census.

== Geology ==
The village is known within the state for its dolomitic limestone quarry, which produces harbor rock, gravel, and a very hard and weather resistant type of marble. The dolomitic limestone is Silurian aged Niagaran dolomite. Glacial sediments overlying the bedrock in the area consist of a pebbly and cobbly, sandy, silty glacial till known as the Valders Member of the Kewaunee Formation. The Valders Member was named after the village and the type section was described along the eastern side of the present day quarry.

== History ==
Valders was settled in the 1850s by immigrants from the Valdres mountainous region of Norway. The largest town in Valdres is Fagernes, but many immigrants arriving in Wisconsin came from the valleys of Vestre Slidre and Øystre Slidre, when hunger (sult) in these rocky hillside farms was far from unheard of. Valders did not really develop as a village until the arrival of the railroad in 1896, the traditional year of its founding. It was incorporated as a village under Wisconsin law in 1921, with William F. Christel as the first village president.

As the village was founded by Norwegians, it was natural that the first churches were Lutheran: Valders Lutheran parish, Our Savior Lutheran parish, and Gjerpin Lutheran parish. These were later combined into Faith Lutheran parish (ELCA). There is also a small Protestant Conference parish. After the arrival of the railroad, many German settlers moved in who were primarily Catholic, but no parish was developed for them. To this day, there is still a significant population of Catholics, including most of the area farmers, who worship at St. Gregory in St. Nazianz to the south, St. Mary of the Immaculate Conception in Clarks Mills to the north (presently joined to St. Michael in Whitelaw), or St. Thomas the Apostle in Newton to the east.

== Geography ==
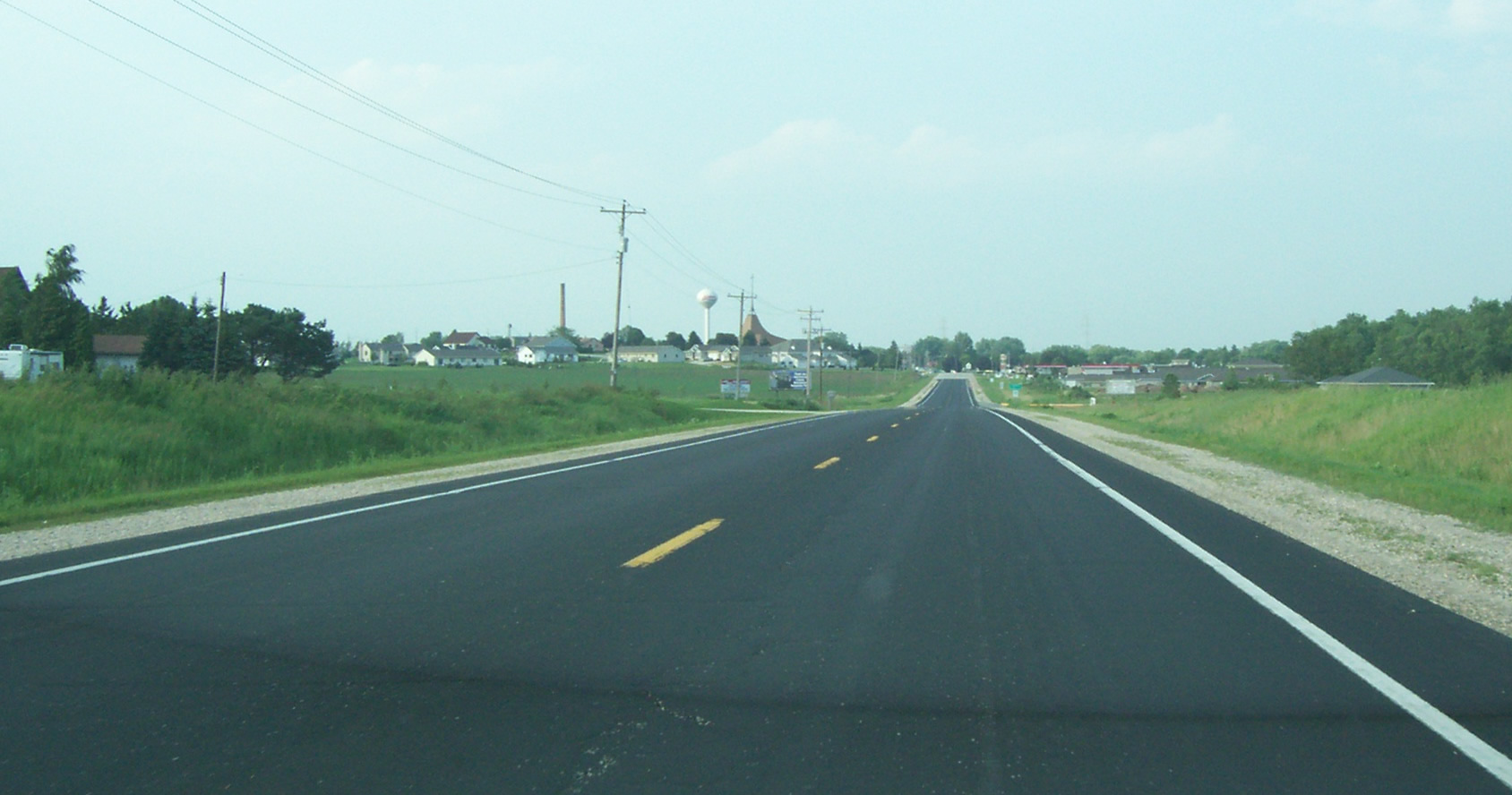
Looking west at Valders from U.S. Route 151

Valders is located on U.S. Route 151, two miles east of the Manitowoc River. The city of Manitowoc lies ten miles to the east on Lake Michigan.

According to the United States Census Bureau, the village has a total area of 1.47 square miles (3.81 km^{2}), all land.

== Demographics ==
Historical population
Census	Pop.	Note	%±
1930	504		—
1940	580		15.1%
1950	560		−3.4%
1960	622		11.1%
1970	821		32.0%
1980	984		19.9%
1990	905		−8.0%
2000	948		4.8%
2010	962		1.5%
2020	952		−1.0%
U.S. Decennial Census

=== 2010 census ===
As of the census of 2010, there were 962 people, 406 households, and 272 families living in the village. The population density was 654.4 inhabitants per square mile (252.7/km^{2}). There were 432 housing units at an average density of 293.9 per square mile (113.5/km^{2}). The racial makeup of the village was 97.2% White, 0.1% Native American, 1.2% from other races, and 1.5% from two or more races. Hispanic or Latino people of any race were 6.3% of the population.

There were 406 households, of which 33.5% had children under the age of 18 living with them, 51.2% were married couples living together, 11.8% had a female householder with no husband present, 3.9% had a male householder with no wife present, and 33.0% were non-families. 29.3% of all households were made up of individuals, and 12% had someone living alone who was 65 years of age or older. The average household size was 2.37 and the average family size was 2.90.

The median age in the village was 37.4 years. 26.1% of residents were under the age of 18; 7% were between the ages of 18 and 24; 26.5% were from 25 to 44; 25.4% were from 45 to 64; and 15.1% were 65 years of age or older. The gender makeup of the village was 49.0% male and 51.0% female.

=== 2000 census ===
As of the census of 2000, there were 948 people, 375 households, and 258 families living in the village. The population density was 935.6 people per square mile (362.4/km^{2}). There were 387 housing units at an average density of 381.9 per square mile (147.9/km^{2}). The racial makeup of the village was 99.26% White, 0.32% Native American, 0.32% Asian, 0.11% from other races. Hispanic or Latino people of any race were 0.53% of the population.

There were 375 households, out of which 37.1% had children under the age of 18 living with them, 55.7% were married couples living together, 8.3% had a female householder with no husband present, and 31.2% were non-families. 28.3% of all households were made up of individuals, and 13.3% had someone living alone who was 65 years of age or older. The average household size was 2.52 and the average family size was 3.10.

In the village, the population was spread out, with 28.9% under the age of 18, 8.1% from 18 to 24, 30.8% from 25 to 44, 19.6% from 45 to 64, and 12.6% who were 65 years of age or older. The median age was 33 years. For every 100 females, there were 92.7 males. For every 100 females age 18 and over, there were 98.8 males.

The median income for a household in the village was $45,167, and the median income for a family was $55,714. Males had a median income of $36,429 versus $24,440 for females. The per capita income for the village was $19,691. About 0.8% of families and 3.0% of the population were below the poverty line, including 2.8% of those under age 18 and 6.6% of those age 65 or over.

== Businesses ==
Valders has a large pre-fabricated reinforced concrete factory and is the center of a substantial dairy and grain producing area.

== Education ==
The Valders Area School District consists of Valders Elementary School (K-4), Valders Middle School (5-8), and Valders High School (9-12). The School District serves the communities of Cato, Eaton, Liberty, Manitowoc Rapids, Newton, Rockland, St. Nazianz, Valders, and Whitelaw.

Valders High School is part of the Olympian Conference and the Olympian/Packerland Large Conference. The Olympian Conference includes Brillion, Chilton, Hilbert, Manitowoc Lutheran, St. Mary Central, Reedsville, Manitowoc, Roncalli, Wrightstown, and Mishicot. The sports that compete in only the Olympian Conference are basketball, volleyball, golf, cross country, wrestling, track and field, baseball, and softball. Valders only competing sports in the Olympian/Packerland Large Conference are gymnastics, soccer, swimming, and football.

== Notable people ==
- Donald K. Helgeson, Wisconsin State Representative
- Bruno E. Jacob, Ripon College professor and founder of the National Forensics League; born in Valders, but lived most of his life in Ripon
- Logan Vander Velden, NBA player
