= William Moore (Wisconsin politician) =

American politician, businessman, and livestock dealer

William H. Moore (1886-1961) was a politician, businessman, and livestock dealer.

== Biography ==
Moore was born on November 13, 1886, in Gardner, Wisconsin. He graduated from Dollar Bay High School in Dollar Bay, Michigan in 1905. Moore was elected to the Wisconsin State Assembly as an Independent in 1932. He later became a Republican. Additionally, Moore was chairman and assessor of Nasewaupee, Wisconsin, was a member of the Nesewaupee School Board, and a member of the Door County, Wisconsin Board. Moore served as President of the Door County Mutual Insurance Company. Moore died on October 5, 1961.
