= Chris Greisen =

American football player (born 1976)

No. 15, 14
- Position: Quarterback

Personal information
- Born: July 2, 1976 (age 50); Berlin, Wisconsin, U.S.
- Listed height: 6 ft 3 in (1.91 m)
- Listed weight: 223 lb (101 kg)

Career information
- High school: Sturgeon Bay (Sturgeon Bay, Wisconsin)
- College: Northwest Missouri State
- NFL draft: 1999: 7th round, 239th overall pick

Career history
- Arizona Cardinals (1999–2001); Washington Redskins (2002)*; Rhein Fire (2003); Green Bay Blizzard (2004); Dallas Desperados (2005–2006); Georgia Force (2007–2008); Florida Tuskers (2009); Milwaukee Iron (2010); Florida Tuskers (2010); Dallas Cowboys (2010); Virginia Destroyers (2011); Dallas Cowboys (2011); Virginia Destroyers (2012)
- * Offseason or practice squad member only

Awards and highlights
- UFL champion (2011); 2× AFL Offensive Player of the Year (2007, 2010); 2× First-team All-Arena (2007, 2010); 2× AFL passing yards leader (2008, 2010); Division II national champion (1998); Division II All-American (1998); MIAA Offensive P.O.Y. (1998); 2× First-team All-MIAA (1997, 1998)

Career NFL statistics
- Games played: 5
- Pass attempts: 16
- Pass completions: 7
- Percentage: 43.8
- TD–INT: 1–0
- Passing yards: 69
- Passer rating: 77.3
- Stats at Pro Football Reference

Career AFL statistics
- TD–INT: 324–40
- Passing yards: 15,108
- Passer rating: 127.23
- Stats at ArenaFan.com

Christopher J. Greisen (born July 2, 1976) is an American former professional football player who was a quarterback in the National Football League (NFL), NFL Europe, Arena Football League (AFL), and United Football League (UFL). He is the current coach for West De Pere High School. He was selected by the Arizona Cardinals in the seventh round of the 1999 NFL draft. He was also a member of the Washington Redskins and Dallas Cowboys of the NFL, the Rhein Fire of NFL Europe, the Green Bay Blizzard of the af2, the Dallas Desperados, Georgia Force, and Milwaukee Iron of the AFL, and the Florida Tuskers and Virginia Destroyers of the UFL. He played college football for the Northwest Missouri State Bearcats.

== Early life ==
Greisen attended Sturgeon Bay High School. As a senior, he suffered a knee injury that impacted his college scholarship offers. He accepted a football scholarship from Division II Northwest Missouri State University.

As a freshman in 1995, he posted 13-of-31 completions for 78 yards and 2 touchdowns. As a sophomore in 1996, he made 15-of-28 completions for 284 yards and one touchdown.

As a junior in 1997, he became a starter, tallying 155-of-272 completions for 2,456 yards, 23 passing touchdowns, 7 interceptions and one rushing touchdown.

As a senior in 1998, he recorded 200-of-332 completions for 2,937 yards, 25 passing touchdowns and 5 rushing touchdowns. He also led the Bearcats to a 15–0 mark and their first ever NCAA Division II Football Championship.

He compiled a career 27–1 winning record, graduated with 9 school passing records, including being first on the All-time list for single-season touchdowns (25) and passing yards (2,937). He earned Academic All-MIAA honors as a sophomore, while taking MIAA Player of the Year honors in 1998.

In 2007, he was inducted into the Northwest Missouri State M-Club Hall of Fame. In 2012, he was inducted into the Mid-America Intercollegiate Athletics Association Hall of Fame.

== Professional career ==
=== Arizona Cardinals ===
Greisen was selected by the Arizona Cardinals in the seventh round (239th overall) of the 1999 NFL draft. As the third-string quarterback behind Jake Plummer and Dave Brown, he appeared in a total of five games between the 1999 and 2000 seasons, while completing 7 of his 16 pass attempts for one touchdown and no interceptions.

In 2001, he was declared inactive in all of the regular-season games. In 2002, he was passed on the depth chart by rookies Josh McCown and Preston Parsons, leading to his release on September 1.

=== Washington Redskins ===
On December 18, 2002, he was signed to the Washington Redskins' practice squad. He was not re-signed after the season.

=== Rhein Fire ===
In 2003, he signed with the Rhein Fire of NFL Europe. He shared the starting quarterback position with Nick Rolovich, playing most of the times in the second and fourth quarters of the games. He posted 76-of-131 completions for 843 yards, 10 touchdowns and 5 interceptions, while helping the team reach World Bowl XI.

=== Green Bay Blizzard ===
In 2004, Greisen joined the af2's Green Bay Blizzard. The af2 was the Arena Football League's development league. He threw for 2,718 yards and 61 touchdowns.

=== Dallas Desperados ===
In 2005, Greisen signed a two-year contract with the AFL's Dallas Desperados, to serve as the team's backup behind Clint Stoerner and later Clint Dolezel. In two seasons, he threw 11-of-16 completions for 142 yards, 3 touchdowns and no interceptions. Greisen became a free agent after the 2006 season.

=== Georgia Force ===
In 2007, Greisen signed with the Georgia Force. The team finished the regular season with a 14–2 record and won the Southern Division championship. Georgia hosted the National Conference Championship, but lost 66–56 to the Columbus Destroyers. On the season, Greisen completed 74 percent of his passes (393-for-531) with 117 touchdowns, 12 interceptions, and 4,871 yards. His 117 touchdowns were the AFL single season record until it was broken by Tommy Grady in 2012 (142 touchdowns).

In 2008, although the team started the year with a 3–5 mark, it finished with a 10–6 record and once again won the Southern Division championship. But after a first round bye in the playoffs, the team lost 73–70 to the Cleveland Gladiators in the divisional round, the team's second straight home playoff loss. On the year, Greisen was 399-for-585 (68.2%), 4,956 yards, 97 touchdowns and 17 interceptions. The league folded after the 2008 season.

=== Florida Tuskers (first stint) ===
On August 25, 2009, Greisen signed with the Florida Tuskers for the inaugural season of the United Football League (UFL). As the backup quarterback behind Brooks Bollinger, he registered 13-of-20 completions for 116 yards and one touchdown.

=== Milwaukee Iron ===
Following the conclusion of the 2009 UFL season, Greisen returned to the AFL who had resumed operations. He signed with his hometown team, the Milwaukee Iron on January 2, 2010. He led the Iron to an 11–5 record and the Midwest Division championship. On the year, he posted a 128.2 passer rating (led the league), 382-for-563 completions (67.9%) with 107 touchdowns (second in the league) and 11 interceptions.

His 5,139 yards passing broke the AFL's record for yards in a season. In the first round of the playoffs, the Iron beat the Chicago Rush to advance to the AFL's conference championship, but lost to the eventual ArenaBowl champion Spokane Shock 60–57.

After the 2010 season, Greisen had completed 69.9 percent of his passes in his AFL career with 15,108 yards, 324 touchdowns and 40 interceptions.

=== Florida Tuskers (second stint) ===
Following the conclusion of the 2010 AFL season, Greisen re-signed with the Tuskers for the 2010 UFL season. Although he was the backup quarterback behind Brooks Bollinger again, he took over the starting position after Bollinger was injured, helping the team win the last three games.

In the regular season, he posted a 97.5 passer rating, 58-for-84 completions for 664 yards, 5 touchdowns and 3 interceptions. In the 2010 UFL championship game 20–23 loss against the Las Vegas Locomotives, he was 24-for-42 for 346 passing yards and two rushing touchdowns.

=== Dallas Cowboys (first stint) ===
On December 27, 2010, he was signed by the Dallas Cowboys' practice squad, to provide depth in case starting quarterback Jon Kitna could not play because of an oblique muscle injury. On December 31, he was promoted to the active roster for the season finale against the Philadelphia Eagles, in which he did not play as a backup to Stephen McGee.

=== Virginia Destroyers (first stint) ===
In 2011, Greisen returned to the UFL to play for the Virginia Destroyers, who assumed rights over the Tuskers' players when the team folded. He officially signed with the Destroyers on June 16. In the shortened-season, Greisen led the Destroyers to a 3–1 record, with the one loss coming in the season finale against the Sacramento Mountain Lions in a game he sat out most of due to injury.

He helped lead the Destroyers to the 2011 UFL championship game, his third consecutive appearance in the UFL Championship game. Greisen completed 21 of 31 passes for 154 yards, as Virginia won the game 17–3.

=== Dallas Cowboys (second stint) ===
On December 14, 2011, he was signed to the Cowboys practice squad after backup quarterback Jon Kitna was placed on the injured reserve list with a back injury. Despite first appearing in the NFL in the 1999 season, Greisen maintained practice squad eligibility because he had been active for only eight NFL games, which was less than the nine games limit. On December 31, he was promoted to the active roster. He was declared inactive for the season finale against the New York Giants as the team's third-string quarterback. He was not re-signed after the season.

=== Virginia Destroyers (second stint) ===
On March 15, 2012, Greisen was declared a free agent. He returned to the Destroyers for the 2012 season, which was cut short due to financial shortfalls; it was his last stint in professional football.

== Coaching career ==
After retiring from professional football, Greisen became active in the local prep football coaching scene in the Green Bay, Wisconsin area, serving as an assistant coach for Notre Dame Academy, Green Bay Southwest High School and Freedom High School before accepting his first head coaching position, at West De Pere High School, in April 2020.

== Personal life ==
Greisen earned a degree in physical education with a minor in mathematics from Northwest Missouri State. He taught at Notre Dame Academy and is a convert to Catholicism from Lutheranism. He also runs the Chris Greisen Quarterback Academy during the season at Texas Stadium and through the offseason in Green Bay, Wisconsin.

Greisen is the older brother of former NFL linebacker Nick Greisen.
