= Oconto High School =

Coordinates: 44.9012°N 87.8709°W

Location
- 1717 Superior Avenue; Oconto, (Oconto County), Wisconsin 54153; United States

Information
- Type: Public high school
- Principal: Katie Stanczak
- Staff: 20.00 (FTE)
- Enrollment: 265 (2023–2024)
- Student to teacher ratio: 13.25
- Colors: Blue and gold
- Fight song: "OHS School Song"
- Athletics conference: Packerland
- Nickname: Blue Devils
- Website: https://oconto.k12.wi.us/en-US/oconto-high-school-e8d1abde

Oconto High School is a public high school in Oconto, Wisconsin, USA. Enrollment is approximately 394 students.

The present school building was constructed in 1969. The school mascot is the Blue Devil and the school colors are blue and gold. The principal of Oconto High School is Katie Stanczak.

== Athletics ==
Oconto is a member of the Wisconsin Interscholastic Athletic Association. It is a member of the Packerland Conference.

In 1999, the volleyball team advanced to the state semi-finals.

In 2003, the baseball team advanced to the WIAA Division 2 State semi-final game against Milwaukee Lutheran in Fox Cities Stadium. The Blue Devils lost 2-1 to the eventual state champion in the final innings and finished the season 17-8.

In 2009, the Oconto wrestling team won its first Packerland Conference championship since 1980 with a 9-1 record. They took third in the Clintonville regional with a score of 169.

In 2012, the volleyball team advanced to the Division 3 state title game but lost to Oostburg High School.

In 2013, the baseball team won the school's first state title, defeating Westby 4-3.

On April 16, 2014, a fire in the school left the school damaged in the bathroom and main hall. The halls and the bathroom were later cleaned up and remodeled and then resumed classes on May 12, 2014.

=== Athletic conference affiliation history ===
- Northeastern Wisconsin Conference (1927-1970)
- Bay Conference (1970-1979)
- Central Wisconsin Conference (1979-1984)
- Packerland Conference (1984–present)

== Academics ==
In 2009 the OHS LifeSmarts team won first place at the state, then national levels.

In 2024, the OHS LifeSmarts won state, then went to San Diego for Nationals. They placed 10th at the national level.

== Enrollment ==
From 2000–2019, high school enrollment declined 33.6%.

Enrollment at Oconto High School, 2000–2019

== Notable alumni ==
- William T. Sullivan (1913), former member of the Wisconsin State Assembly
- Jeremy Lade (1999), wheelchair basketball player
- Elijah Behnke (2001), member of the Wisconsin State Assembly
- Jake Dickert (2002 - transferred), Head Football Coach for the Washington State Cougars
