= Richard W. Fellows =

Recipient of the Silver Star

Richard William Fellows
- Born: September 7, 1914; Algoma, Wisconsin, US
- Died: August 7, 1998 (aged 83); Riverside, California, US
- Burial place: United States Air Force Academy, Colorado
- Military career
- Allegiance: United States
- Branch: United States Army Air Forces; United States Air Force
- Service years: 1937–1966
- Rank: Brigadier general
- Conflicts: World War II
- Awards: Silver Star; Distinguished Flying Cross with oak leaf cluster Air Medal with four oak leaf clusters War Cross (Greece); French Croix de Guerre with palm

Brigadier General Richard W. Fellows (September 7, 1914– August 7, 1998) was a United States Air Force officer who served during World War II and the Cold War.

He was born in Algoma, Wisconsin, in 1914. He graduated from Algoma High School in 1931 and attended the University of Wisconsin for a year and a half.

== Early career ==
In 1933, he received a Congressional appointment to the United States Military Academy. He graduated In 1937, ranking 88th in a class of 298 and assigned to the Cavalry. Second Lieutenant Fellows' first duty station was Randolph Field, Texas, where he attended pilot training school. He completed his advanced training in Pursuit at Kelly Field, Texas, and received his pilot wings in 1938. He eventually was rated as a command pilot.

Lieutenant Fellows' first assignment after Kelly Field was Nichols Field in the Philippines. He earned a combat observer rating as a member of the 2d Observation Squadron there and transferred to the Philippine Air Depot, which he commanded as a captain upon outbreak of World War II.

== Battle of the Philippines (1941–1942) ==
In December 1941 when Nichols Field became untenable, he transferred his depot to the outskirts of Manila. Depot assembly and repair operations were conducted along boulevards used as runways and in various buildings converted to shops. Although Manila was declared an "Open City" December 25, 1941, the depot continued its operations and evacuation activities to the Bataan Peninsula up until January 1, 1942, when the last P-40 Warhawk under repair was flown to Bataan as the victorious Japanese were entering the city.

On Bataan, Captain Fellows, after reorganizing the remnant of the Philippine Air Depot, was assigned as deputy of the 24th Pursuit Group organized as Infantry and charged with a beach defense mission. At the time of the fall of Bataan, Captain Fellows was serving as a pilot in the "Bamboo Fleet", composed of a handful of small civilian and military aircraft carrying supplies into Bataan from Southern Philippine bases and evacuating selected persons from the peninsula.

His last flight from Bataan was made the morning of April 8, 1942, the day the fighting lines collapsed. Bataan surrendered the following day.

== Mediterranean Theater ==
After several months of hospitalization Captain Fellows was returned to duty in August 1942 as squadron commander in the 30th Bombardment Group, which he later commanded, at March Field, California. He attended the First Air Staff Officers' course sponsored by General Arnold for combat experienced officers in the fall of 1943 and was assigned, following the courses, to the Mediterranean Theatre.

As deputy and commander of the 376th Bombardment Group, he was awarded the Silver Star, Distinguished Flying Gross with oak leak cluster, and Air Medal with four oak leaf clusters for his services. Other awards or honors for this period included a combat promotion to the grade of colonel, the French Croix de Guerre with Palm, the War Cross (Greece), and Pilot Wings of the Royal Yugoslav Air Force.

He was appointed Deputy A-3 of the Fifteenth Air Force in Italy, returning to the United States and duty in the War Department General Staff after the war in Europe was concluded.

== United States Air Force ==
He attended Stanford University, receiving a master's degree in the School of Education in 1948. He served a two-month internship in the personnel departments of Douglas Aircraft Corporation and the Standard Oil Company of California, after which he was assigned in personnel and programming activities in Headquarters Continental Air Command at Mitchel Air Force Base, New York, until 1952.

He graduated from the Air War College in 1953 and spent the next three years in Newfoundland as commander, first of Pepperrell Air Force Base and later Ernest Harmon Air Force Base.

He was assigned to the Directorate of Programs in Headquarters U.S. Air Force in 1956, serving as deputy director until 1961 when he was reassigned to Headquarters Air Force Logistics Command, Wright-Patterson Air Force Base, Ohio, as deputy director of maintenance engineering. He was promoted to brigadier general in May 1960.

From July 1962 until November of the same year, General Fellows was deputy director of plans and programs at Headquarters Air Force Logistics Command Headquarters. In November 1962 he became director. In July 1964 he became the deputy director for logistics, Joint Staff, Organization of the Joint Chiefs of Staff.

He retired on 1 September 1966.

== Decorations ==

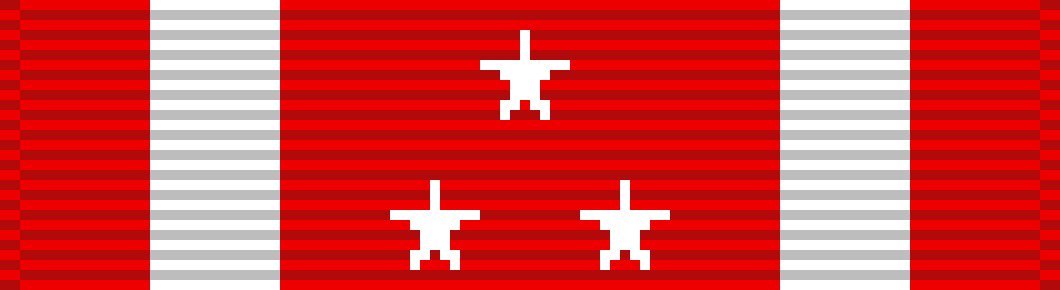

| 1st row | Silver Star | | |
| 2nd row | Distinguished Flying Cross with 1 Oak leaf cluster | Air Medal with 4 Oak leaf clusters | Army Commendation Medal |
| 3rd row | Presidential Unit Citation with 4 Oak leaf clusters | American Defense Service Medal with Foreign Service Clasp | American Campaign Medal |
| 4th row | Asiatic-Pacific Campaign Medal with 1 Campaign star | European-African-Middle Eastern Campaign Medal with 9 Campaign stars | World War II Victory Medal |
| 5th row | Army of Occupation Medal | National Defense Service Medal with 1 Service star | Air Force Longevity Service Ribbon with 4 Oak leaf clusters |
| 6th row | Croix De Guerre with Palm | Philippine Defense Medal with 1 Campaign star | Philippine Presidential Unit Citation |

Foreign Award (Not authorized for uniform wear)

War Cross (Greece)

== Effective dates of promotion ==
Rank Temporary Permanent

- Second Lieutenant 12 Jun 1937 12 Jun 1937
- First Lieutenant 12 Jun 1940 12 Jun 1940
- Captain 9 Sep 1940 22 Jul 1947
- Major 12 May 1942
- Lieutenant Colonel 9 Sep 1943 2 Jul 1948
- Colonel 9 Nov 1944 28 Jul 1951
- Brigadier General 4 May 1960 1 Sep 1966
