= Oneida Nation School System =

School in Oneida, Wisconsin

Coordinates: 44.4985°N 88.1943°W

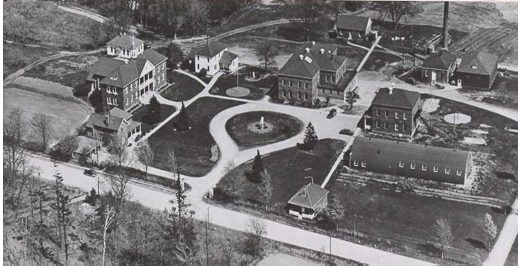
Oneida Indian Boarding School, circa 1919

Oneida Nation School System is a tribal K-12 school in Oneida, Wisconsin. It is affiliated with the Bureau of Indian Education (BIE), and serves the Oneida Nation.

It has a 162,000-square-foot (15,100 m^{2}) 38-classroom elementary school building and a separate high school building. In 2001 the enrollment of the high school was slightly above 100.

== History ==
The elementary school opened in 1994 and the high school opened in 1995. The initial number of employees was eight to ten and initial enrollment of the elementary was 35.

In January 2007 the tribal council and school administration saw a wave of poor student behavior and decided to voluntarily close the school for a week and revise policies so discipline would return to normal. A student quoted in an article in the Green Bay Press-Gazette felt the move was an overreaction.

== Athletics ==
As of 2008 it was common for sports teams to have insufficient students and not meet for a particular year as the school had a relatively low population. That year the high school started a competitive lacrosse team at the junior varsity level.
