= Algoma High School =

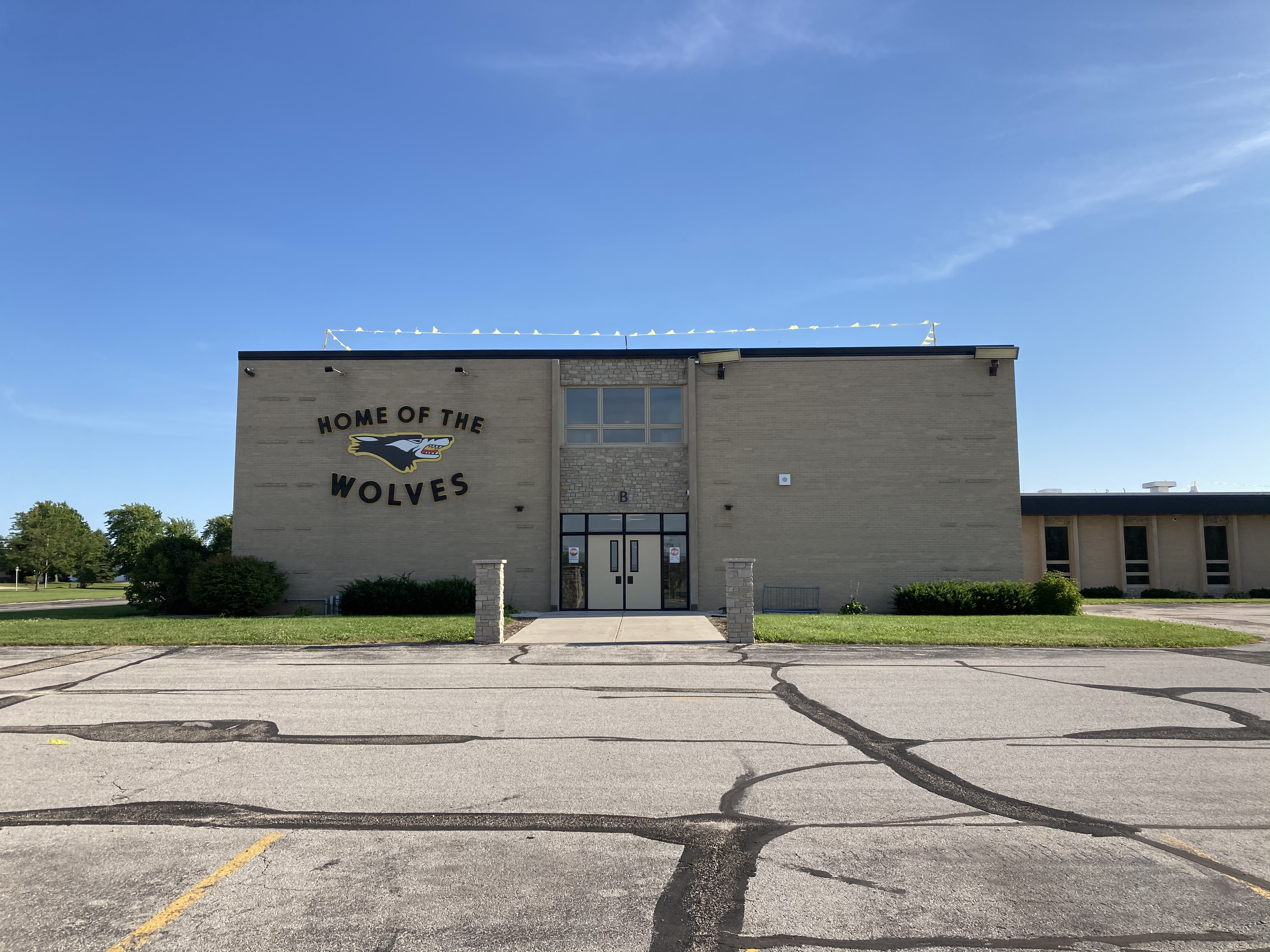
- The school in 2020

Location
- 1715 Division Street; Algoma, Wisconsin 54201; United States; 44.5972°N 87.4458°W

Information
- Type: Public high school
- Established: 1885
- School district: Algoma School District
- NCES School ID: 550015000016
- Principal: Nick Cochart
- Teaching staff: 24.25 (on an FTE basis)
- Grades: 7–12
- Enrollment: 280 (2023–2024)
- Student to teacher ratio: 11.55
- Colors: Black and gold
- Athletics conference: Packerland Conference
- Nickname: Wolves
- Newspaper: Way of the Wolves
- Yearbook: Scroll of the Wolves
- Website: www.algomawolves.org/schools/middle-high/

Algoma High School is a public high school in Algoma, Wisconsin, United States. It is part of the Algoma School District.

== History ==
Algoma High School opened in 1885. It was housed with the grade school in various different buildings, including a Public Works Administration building. In 1966, a referendum to build a new school passed, with that building opening in 1969.

The school began a mentoring program in 2018; the Wolf Den program and a separate Wolf Tech technical education and vocational program were features of an award-winning All-America City Award presentation in 2020.

== Athletics ==
The school's athletic teams are known as the Wolves, and compete in the Packerland Conference, an affiliate of the Wisconsin Interscholastic Athletic Association. The Wolves have won six state championships:

State Championships
Year	Division/Class	Sport
2017	3	Track and field (Girls)
2013	4	Softball
2013	4	Basketball (Girls)
1986	C	Basketball (Girls)
1983	B	Baseball
1981	B	Basketball (Girls)

=== Conference affiliation history ===
- Northeastern Wisconsin Conference (1927-1970)
- Packerland Conference (1970–present)

== Performing arts ==
Algoma had a competitive marching band in the late 1920s.

== Notable alumni ==
- Richard W. Fellows, United States Air Force officer
