= Sturgeon Bay High School =

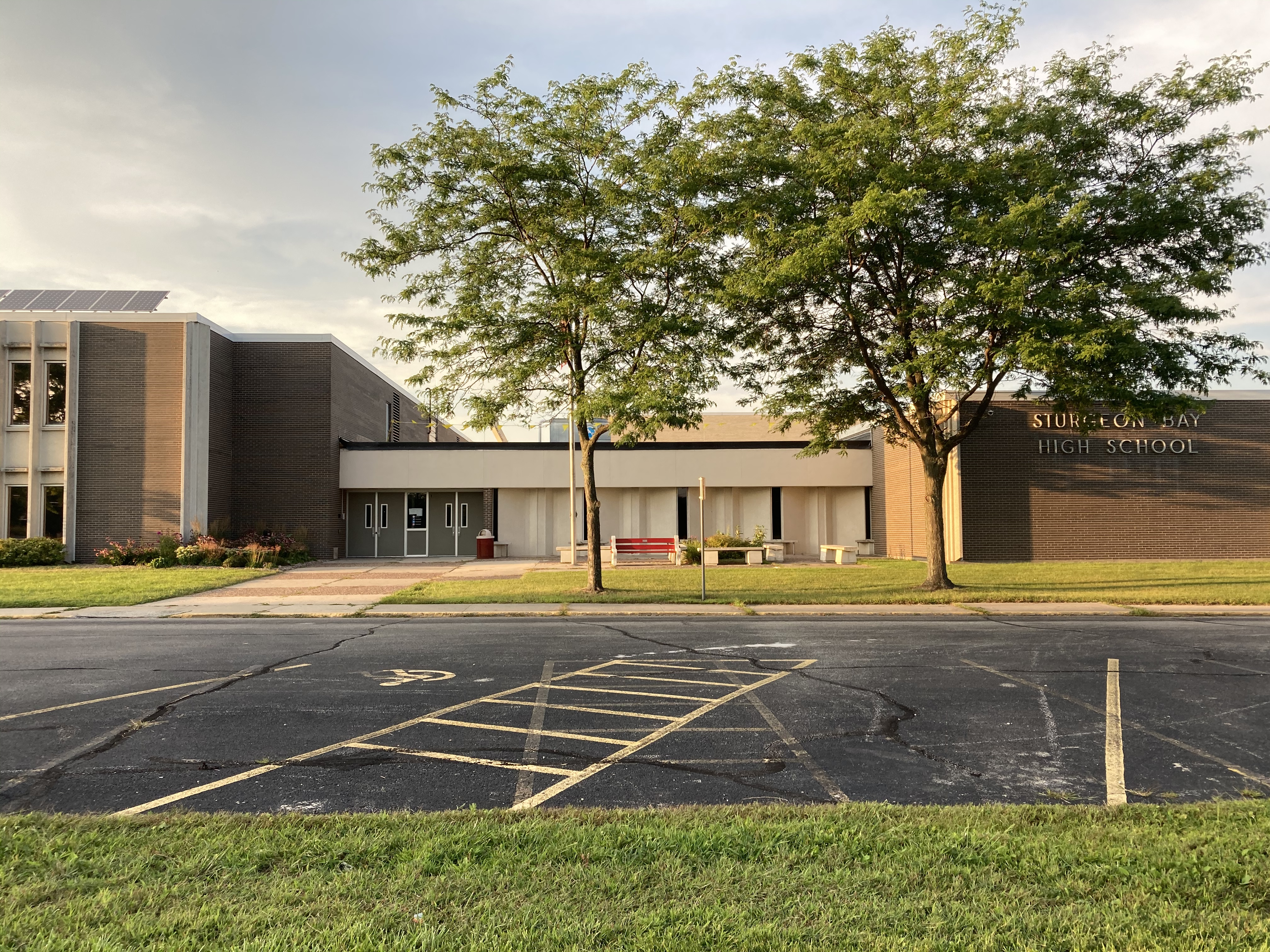

Location
- 1230 Michigan St; Sturgeon Bay, Wisconsin 54235; United States
- Coordinates: 44.8358°N 87.3628°W

Information
- School type: Public High School
- School district: Sturgeon Bay School District
- Faculty: 27.91 (FTE)
- Grades: 9 through 12
- Enrollment: 402 (2023-2024)
- Student to teacher ratio: 14.40
- Colors: Red and white
- Athletics conference: Packerland Conference
- Teams: Clippers
- Website: https://www.sturbay.k12.wi.us/schools/high/

Sturgeon Bay High School is a public high school located in Sturgeon Bay, Wisconsin. It is part of the Sturgeon Bay School District.

== Athletics ==
Sturgeon Bay's athletic teams are known as the Clippers, and compete primarily in the Packerland Conference of the Wisconsin Interscholastic Athletic Association. The Clippers have won 14 WIAA state championships. Sturgeon Bay played football in the MONLPC (Marinette and Oconto, Northern Lakes, and Packerland) league until 2019, when low numbers forced them to move to eight-man football, where they play independently due to the school being too large to participate in eight-man football playoffs.

State Championships (* denotes a co-op team)
Sport	Division/Class	Year
Baseball	2	1991
Cross country (boys)	2	2001
Football	4	2004
Skiing	N/A	1968, 1971
Soccer (boys)	4	2015, 2019
Swimming and diving (boys)*	2	2003–2006
Swimming and diving (girls)	2	2009
Track and field (boys)	B	1959
Track and field (girls)	B	1972

=== Athletic conference affiliation history ===
- Northeastern Wisconsin Conference (1927-1970)
- Packerland Conference (1970–present)

== Notable alumni ==
- Chris Greisen, football player
- Nick Greisen, football player
- Lawrence Johnson, politician
- Anna Augusta Von Helmholtz-Phelan, professor, author
- Casey Rabach, football player
- Lloyd Wasserbach, football player
- Frank N. Graass, politician
