= Manitowoc Lutheran High School =

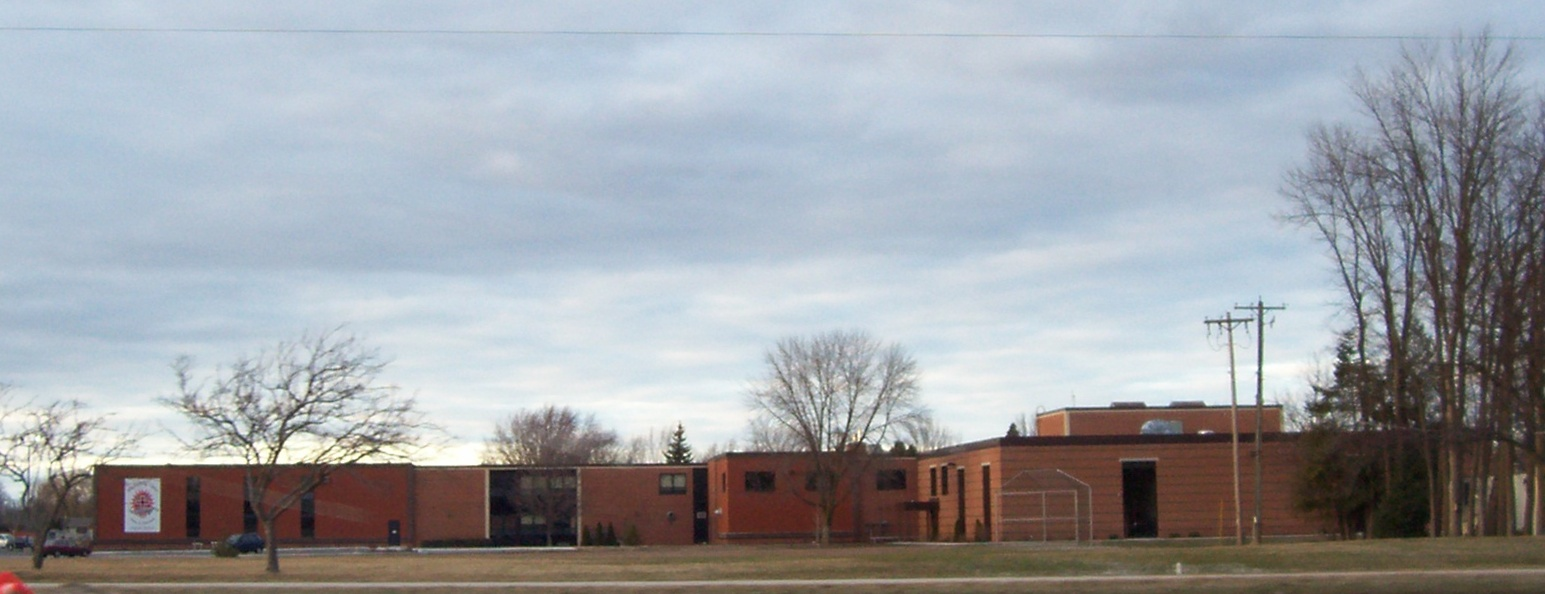
- Profile from Waldo Blvd

Location
- Manitowoc, Wisconsin; United States; 44°06′39.0″N 87°41′53.3″W

Information
- Religious affiliation: Wisconsin Evangelical Lutheran Synod
- Established: 1956
- Principal: David Uhlhorn
- Faculty: 17
- Grades: 9–12
- Colors: Red and Grey
- Athletics conference: Big East
- Mascot: Lancers
- Website: http://www.mlhslancers.org/

Manitowoc Lutheran High School (MLHS) is a WELS Lutheran high school located in Manitowoc, Wisconsin. The school is affiliated with the Wisconsin Evangelical Lutheran Synod (WELS). The high school was founded in 1956, and has been located in its present campus since 1967.

The school typically has about 200 enrolled students.

== Athletics ==
Manitowoc Lutheran's mascot is the Lancer and its colors are red and grey. MLHS is a member of The Big East of the Wisconsin Interscholastic Athletic Association (WIAA).

=== Athletic conference affiliation history ===
- Badger Lutheran Conference (1961-1964)
- Kettle Moraine Conference (1964-1967)
- Peninsula Conference (1967-1970)
- Bay-Lakes Conference (1970-1979)
- Fox Valley Christian Conference (1991-1999)
- Olympian Conference (1999-2015)
- Big East Conference (2015–present)

== Notable alumni ==
- Garth Neustadter, class of 2005, Emmy Award-winning composer and instrumentalist
