= Northeastern Wisconsin Lutheran High School =

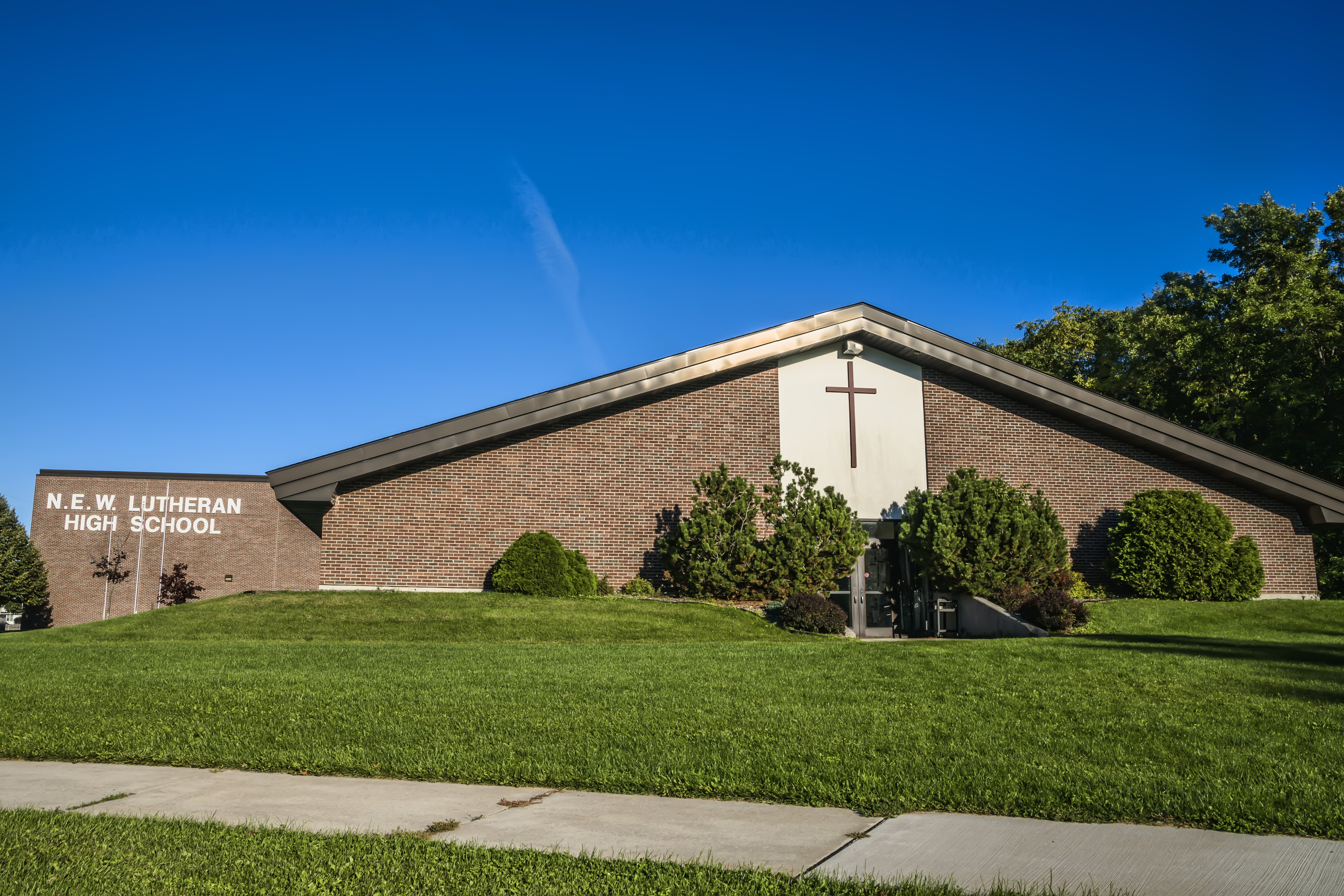
- NEW Lutheran High School

Location
- 1311 S. Robinson Avenue; Green Bay, (Brown County), Wisconsin 54311-5545; United States; 44°28′33″N 87°57′9″W

Information
- Type: Private, Coeducational
- Religious affiliation: Lutheran Church–Missouri Synod
- Established: 1977
- Director: Chris Nelson
- Principal: James McClellan
- Faculty: 12 (2007-2008)
- Grades: 9–12
- Hours in school day: 7
- Colors: Maroon and white
- Song: Washington & Lee Swing
- Athletics: Baseball, Basketball, Soccer, Cross Country, 8 man football, Softball, Volleyball, Golf, Cheer, Track
- Athletics conference: Packerland
- Team name: Blazers
- Executive Director: Chris Nelson
- Principal/Guidance Director: James McClellan
- Athletic Directors: Michael Stock
- Website: www.newlhs.com

Northeastern Wisconsin Lutheran High School (abbreviated NEWLHS) is a Lutheran high school in Green Bay, Wisconsin. This school is part of the Lutheran Church–Missouri Synod. NEW Lutheran has an enrollment of approximately 130 students.

The school's history dates back to as early as 1975 when two parties had interest in starting a Lutheran High School within Green Bay. A survey was done within the LCMS churches in Brown County that showed great interest for a school. A meeting was held at Pilgrim Lutheran Church to form a committee that helped establish the school. In 1977, the schools inaugural year included 34 students. Throughout the next two decades, the school had changed its location three times before a building was officially constructed at the cul-de-sac on 1311 South Robinson Avenue in 1993.

== Ministry Life ==
Chapel is held every Tuesday & Thursday mornings around 9:00 am in either the School's gym or in the commons. All students are privileged to attend these chapels which are led by association pastors, faculty, Principals & grade school groups from support schools, the school's worship team Alethia, and once by the Peer Ministry class every school year as well as other entities.

A Women's bible study is held every Thursday morning which is led by a faculty member and the women in attendance. On Friday morning, there is a Men's Bible study.

The school also has a praise band known as "Alethia" which is membered by a selection of students who can sing or play instruments for the band and perform during chapel days.

== Academics ==
NEWLHS has over 52 courses offered to fulfill the graduation requirements of 23 credits. NEW Lutheran students consistently score markedly above WI scores for the ACT and has received awards from ACT for its students' scores. NEW Lutheran offers dual credit courses & AP courses in addition to general course offerings. NEW Lutheran offers business and computer classes that focus on accounting, economics as well as "digital life" classes. Four credits of religion classes are required for graduation at NEW with Old and New Testament classes being required during a student's freshman and sophomore years. NEW also offers online courses that focus on both American history and independent Physical Education. All students are technologically advanced with most courses taught utilizing iPads technology and online information.

=== Fine Arts ===
The school offers classes that focuses on art and music. They are not required, but the schools choir classes are considerably popular. Art courses at NEW start with two semesters of beginners art classes, then could continue to an advanced art course that can last for one to four semesters, finally there is Independent Art which only senior can have if approved by the art teacher.

NEW's music department offers band classes which is open to any student with prior instrument experience. Members of the band class do have the opportunity to play at Blazer athletic events. Choir is the most open of the music classes which allows the development of musical skills and performs concerts three times every year.

== Athletics ==
- 1998 WISAA boys' basketball state champion
- 2006 WIAA girls' volleyball sectional champions (Division 4)
- 2007 WIAA girls' volleyball sectional champions (Division 4)
- 2010 WIAA boys' basketball state runner-up (Division 4) to Randolph
- 2011 WIAA boys' basketball state qualifier
- 2013 WIAA boys' basketball state runner-up (Division 5) to Randolph
- 2013 8-Man Football State Champions (Division 5) against Prairie Farm
- 2014 WIAA boys' basketball state runner-up (Division 5) to Thorp

=== Athletic conference affiliation history ===
- Midwest Classic Conference (1998-1999)
- Packerland Conference (1999–present)
