= John Fellows (brigadier general) =

John Fellows (July 7, 1735 – August 1, 1808) was a Brigadier-General in the Massachusetts Militia who participated in several major battles during the American Revolutionary War.

== Biography ==
Born in Plainfield, New London County, Connecticut Colony, Fellows settled in Sheffield, Province of Massachusetts around 1750.

He fought in the French and Indian Wars. During the Revolution he was present during the British Siege of Boston under George Washington. After the battles of Lexington and Concord he led a regiment to Boston and fought at the Battle of Bunker Hill. In August 1776, Fellows commanded a brigade at the Battle of Long Island covering Washington's retreat after the loss. Fellows commanded a regiment in the Massachusetts Militia at Roxbury, Massachusetts until the end of 1775. On June 25, 1776, he was appointed by the Massachusetts General Court to be brigadier general of the militia reinforcements which was being assembled to support the Continental Army at New York City.

On September 15, 1776, the British General William Howe landed a large force of troops at Kips Bay on the East River near what is now 34th street in NYC. Feeble defense by the American militia of General Parsons and General Fellows soon ended in a rout of American forces. The failure to stop and oppose the enemy was a great disappointment to Washington. General Washington was said to be so distraught at seeing the rout, that he drew his sword and charged down the hill towards the advancing British forces, only to be restrained by an aide at the last moment. His army narrowly escaped annihilation. Fellows also commanded troops at the Battle of White Plains, the Battle of Long Island and in the Saratoga campaign.

A resident of Massachusetts, Fellows belonged to the Provincial Congress of Massachusetts. Fellows helped in the development and settlement at Canandaiga, New York. In 1790 he built the first saw mill at Mud Creek, East Bloomfield, New York in 1790. The 1790 census shows him living in Ontario County, New York. Fellows was also the Sheriff of Berkshire County, Massachusetts for many years. Fellows was appointed proprietor of the town of Wolcott, Vermont.

Fellows died on August 1, 1808, in Sheffield, Massachusetts, and is buried in its Bernard Cemetery.

=== Slave ownership ===
According to research conducted by the Massachusetts Historical Society, Fellows owned at least one slave. A July 1, 1777 bill of sale shows General John Fellows selling a woman by the name of Ton to the 30-year old Sedgwick.

== Controversial book ==
Fellows' nephew, called John Fellows Jr to distinguish him from is uncle, was also present at the Battle of Bunker Hill. He published a book in 1843 entitled The Veil Removed, where he presented numerous letters and statements from veterans of the battle regarding the contested conduct of General Israel Putnam from men who were present at the battle. The letters provided accounts on Putnam's whereabouts and performance during the Battle, the issue of which created a long-standing controversy during the first half of the 19th century.

== See also ==
- List of United States militia units in the American Revolutionary War
- Bibliography of the American Revolutionary War

== Sources ==
- Frederiick A.P. Barnard; Arnold Guyot, eds. (1890). Johnson's (revised) Universal Cyclopaedia ... Volume 3. A.J. Johnson & Company.
- Fellows, John (2009). The Veil Removed. Applewood Books. ISBN 9781429017237.
- "Brigadier General John Fellows". Geni.com. 2016.
- "To George Washington from Brigadier General John Fellows, 18 July 1776". U.S. National Archives.
