= Mishicot High School =

Coordinates: 44°14′20.0″N 87°38′02.3″W

Location
- 660 Washington Street; Mishicot, Wisconsin 54228; United States

Information
- Type: Public
- Principal: Paul Orlich
- Staff: 20.31 (FTE)
- Enrollment: 265 (2023-2024)
- Student to teacher ratio: 13.05
- Colors: Black and orange
- Athletics conference: Big East
- Mascot: Indian
- Website: Mishicot High School

Mishicot High School is a public high school located in Mishicot, Wisconsin, United States.

== Athletics ==
Mishicot's athletic teams are known as the Indians, and compete in the Big East Conference.

In 2021, the girls' basketball team won the state championship, the first team to do so in the school's 124-year history. The softball team also won that year.

=== Athletic conference affiliation history ===
- Peninsula Conference (1933-1970)
- Olympian Conference (1970-2015)
- Big East Conference (2015–present)

== Agricultural education ==
In 2019 the school's plant science program won the CTE Excellence in Action Award.

== Notable alumni ==
- Brendan Dassey, prisoner convicted of murder and subject of Making a Murderer
- Julie Wojta, basketball player
