= Gibraltar Secondary School =

Location
- 3924 HWY 42; Fish Creek, Wisconsin 54212; United States; 45°07′36.3″N 87°13′51.3″W

Information
- School type: Public, K-12 school
- Motto: Engaging Minds, Empowering Learning, Achieving Excellence
- Established: 1917; 109 years ago
- School district: Gibraltar Area School District
- Superintendent: Brett Stousland
- Principal: Secondary: James DeBroux
- Grades: 6-12
- Gender: Mixed
- Student to teacher ratio: 11:1
- Colors: Blue and Gold
- Mascot: Viking
- Newspaper: The Viking Voice
- Website: www.gibraltar.k12.wi.us

Gibraltar Secondary School is a public school in the unincorporated community of Fish Creek, Town of Gibraltar, Door County, Wisconsin, United States. It serves grades 6-12 and is a part of the Gibraltar Area Schools.

It used to be known as Gibraltar High School and served grades 9 through 12.

== History ==
The school was founded in 1917, when the townspeople decided to establish the first high school in the county outside Sturgeon Bay.

== Overview ==
Gibraltar Secondary School is part of the Gibraltar Area School District, and draws students from Gills Rock, Ellison Bay, Sister Bay, Ephraim, Fish Creek, Egg Harbor, and Baileys Harbor. The student-teacher ratio is 11:1.

== Student body ==
Of the 198 students in 2011, 52% were female, and 5% were minorities.

From 2000 to 2019, high school enrollment (grades 9–12) declined 17.6%. Enrollment of students younger than high school declined 21.3%. The drop in middle school enrollment between the school years starting in 2013 and 2014 reflects the enrollment for grade 6 being taken from the middle school and added to the elementary school starting in 2014. This also boosted the elementary school enrollment during the same period.

== Curriculum ==
The school offers Advanced Placement courses; 49% of the students are enrolled in at least one of these courses. Gibraltar offers a heavy focus in the 4 A's (Arts, Athletics, Academics, Activities

== Sports ==
The school's mascot is the Viking, the school colors are blue and gold, and teams compete in the Packerland Conference.

In 1940, the Gibraltar High School boys' basketball team won the peninsula championship. In 1971, the school's ski team finished second in the state competition.

=== Athletic conference affiliation history ===
- Peninsula Conference (1933-1970)
- Bay-Lakes Conference (1970-1979)
- Packerland Conference (1979–present)

== See also ==
- Door County, Wisconsin § Declining public school enrollment
