= Gardner, Wisconsin =

- Town
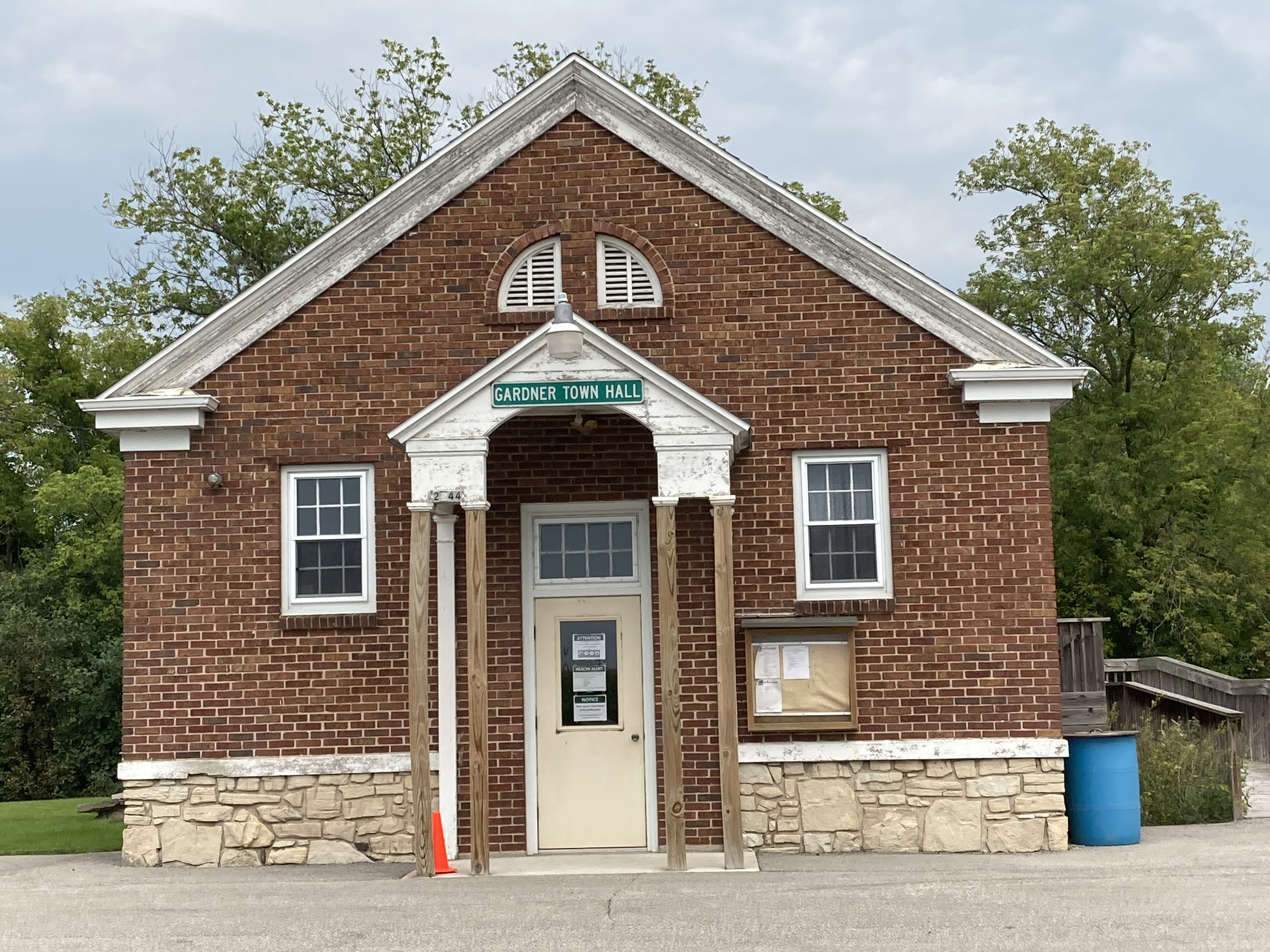
- Gardner town hall

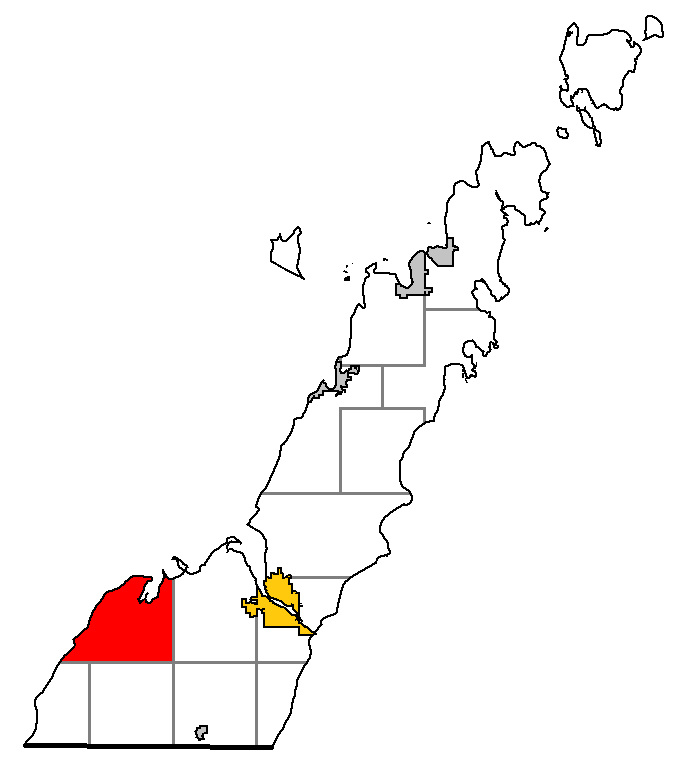
- Location of Gardner, within Door County
- Coordinates: 44°48′46″N 87°34′59″W
- Country: United States
- State: Wisconsin
- County: Door

Area
  - Total: 113.5 sq mi (294.0 km^{2})
  - Land: 34.3 sq mi (88.8 km^{2})
  - Water: 79.2 sq mi (205.2 km^{2})
- Elevation: 604 ft (184 m)

Population (2020)
  - Total: 1,218
  - Density: 35.5/sq mi (13.7/km^{2})
- Time zone: UTC-6 (Central (CST))
  - Summer (DST): UTC-5 (CDT)
- Area code: 920
- FIPS code: 55-28300
- GNIS feature ID: 1583256
- Website: https://townofgardnerwi.gov/

Gardner is a town in Door County, Wisconsin, United States. The population was 1,218 at the 2020 census. The unincorporated community of Little Sturgeon is located in the town.

== Geography ==
According to the United States Census Bureau, the town has a total area of 113.5 square miles (294.0 km^{2}), of which 34.3 square miles (88.8 km^{2}) is land and 79.2 square miles (205.2 km^{2}) (69.80%) is water.

== Demographics ==
As of the census of 2000, there were 1,197 people, 493 households, and 352 families residing in the town. The population density was 34.9 people per square mile (13.5/km^{2}). There were 966 housing units at an average density of 28.2 per square mile (10.9/km^{2}). The racial makeup of the town was 97.58% White, 0.25% African American, 1.42% Native American, 0.17% Asian, and 0.58% from two or more races. Hispanic or Latino of any race were 0.84% of the population.

There were 493 households, out of which 28.4% had children under the age of 18 living with them, 62.5% were married couples living together, 4.9% had a female householder with no husband present, and 28.6% were non-families. 22.5% of all households were made up of individuals, and 9.3% had someone living alone who was 65 years of age or older. The average household size was 2.43 and the average family size was 2.85.

In the town, the population was spread out, with 21.8% under the age of 18, 5.6% from 18 to 24, 28.8% from 25 to 44, 29.3% from 45 to 64, and 14.5% who were 65 years of age or older. The median age was 42 years. For every 100 females, there were 108.2 males. For every 100 females age 18 and over, there were 111.8 males.

The median income for a household in the town was $39,063, and the median income for a family was $46,071. Males had a median income of $30,833 versus $21,741 for females. The per capita income for the town was $21,181. About 4.9% of families and 6.4% of the population were below the poverty line, including 8.4% of those under age 18 and 6.2% of those age 65 or over.

== Sugar Creek County Park ==
The land for Sugar Creek County Park was purchased in 1945; there are 40 acres and 1050 feet of Green Bay shoreline in the park.

Sugar Creek County Park

Climate chart (precipitation, max. and min. temperature)
| J | F | M | A | M | J | J | A | S | O | N | D |
| 55 −10 −14 | 56 −12 −16 | 62 2 −8 | 115 10 1 | 94 16 5 | 108 19 12 | 113 23 16 | 97 22 14 | 93 18 15 | 119 11 4 | 79 8 1 | 56 0 −5 |
- █ Average max. and min. temperatures in °C
- █ Precipitation totals in mm
Imperial conversion
| J | F | M | A | M | J | J | A | S | O | N | D |
| 2.2 14 7 | 2.2 10 3 | 2.4 36 18 | 4.5 50 34 | 3.7 61 41 | 4.3 66 54 | 4.4 73 61 | 3.8 72 57 | 3.7 64 59 | 4.7 52 39 | 3.1 46 34 | 2.2 32 23 |
- █ Average max. and min. temperatures in °F
- █ Precipitation totals in inches

== Notable people ==
- William Moore, member of the Wisconsin State Assembly, was born in the town

== Gallery ==
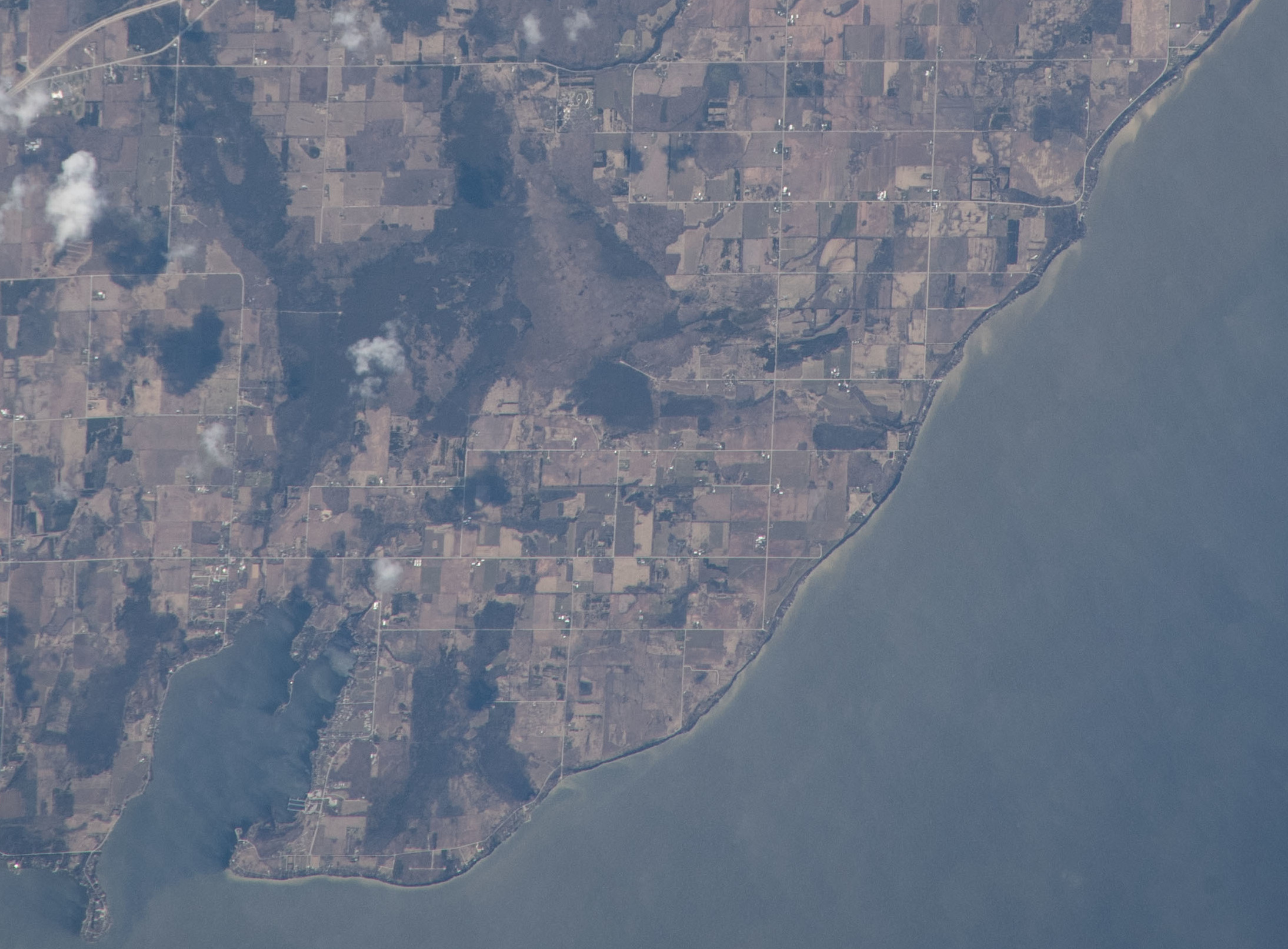
Gardner on April 15, 2020, taken from the International Space Station. Gardner Swamp Wildlife Area is above and to the left of the center.

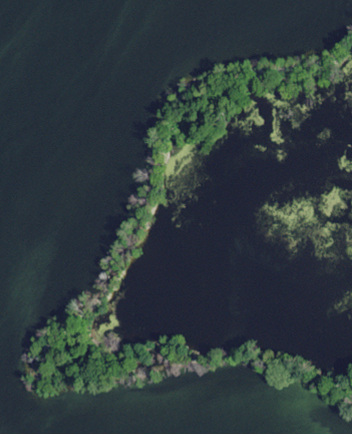
The Gardner portion of Snake Island, also called Basin Island

Northeastern part of mainland Gardner

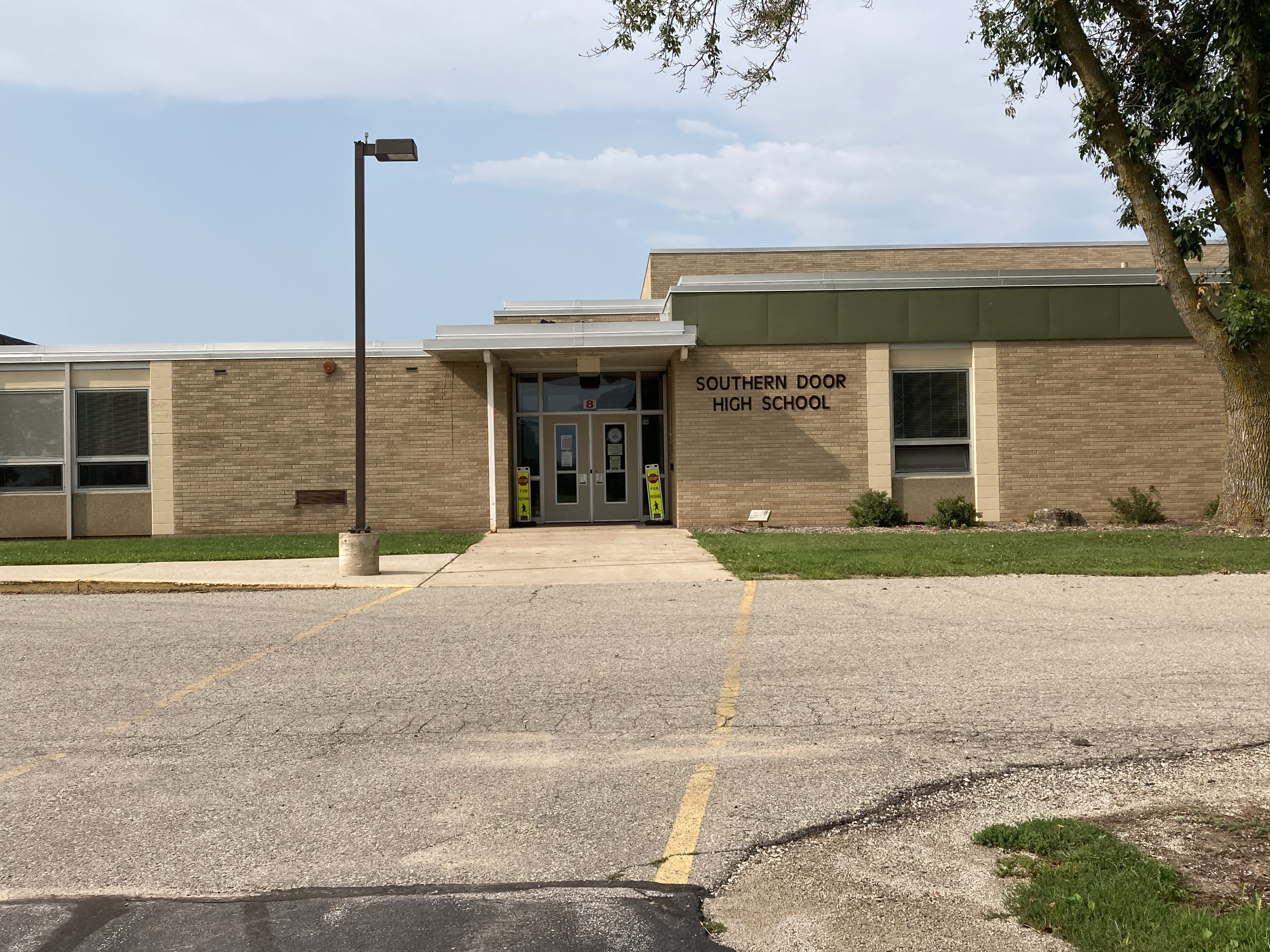
Southern Door High School, located within the town

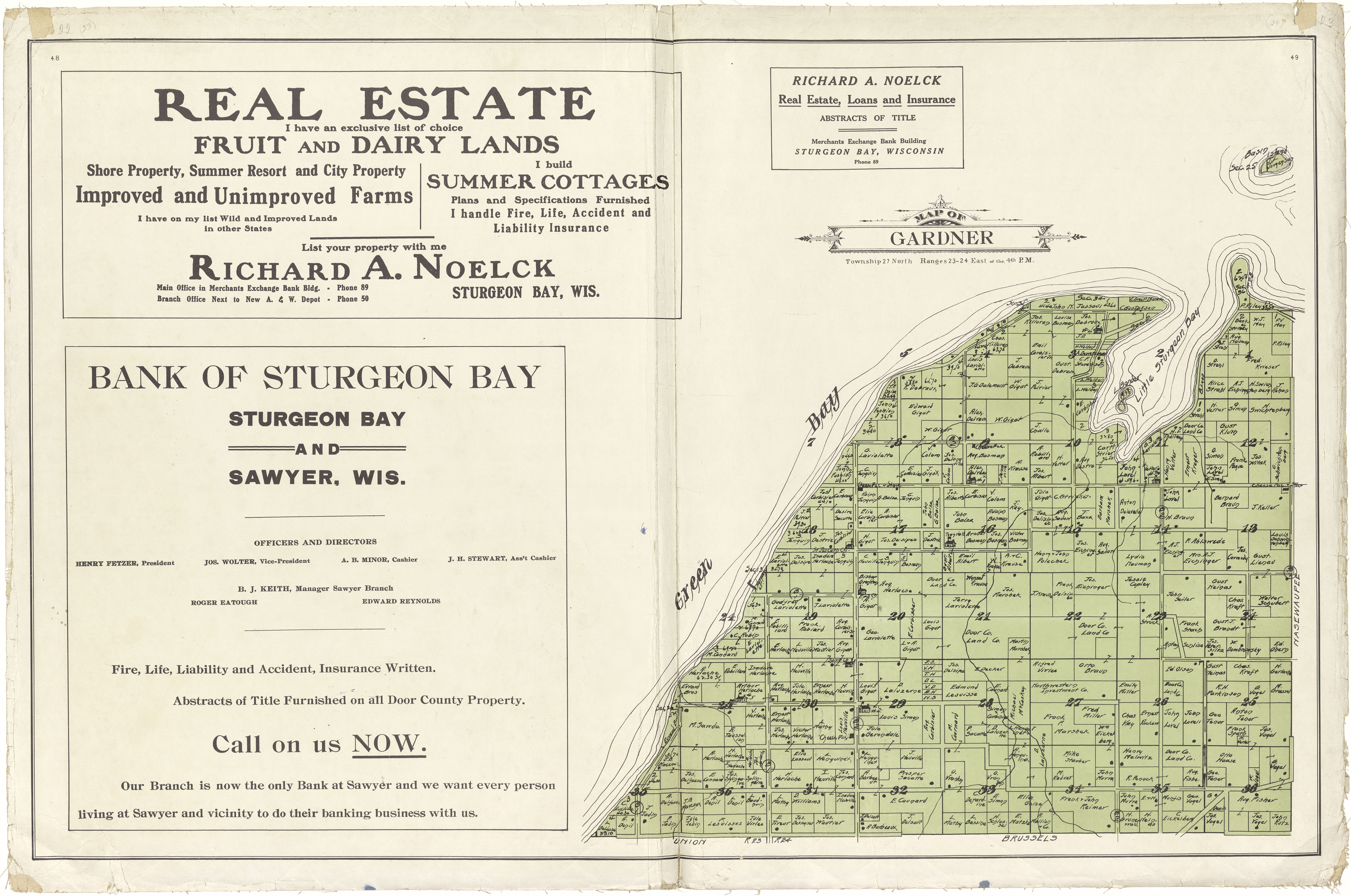
1914 plat map of Gardner
