= High school ice hockey in Wisconsin =

Ice hockey is a popular sport in the state of Wisconsin. As of the 2026-27 school year, there are eighty-five boys teams and twenty-seven girls teams competing in the Wisconsin Hockey Prep (WiHP) leagues of the Wisconsin Interscholastic Athletic Association (WIAA). Non-sanctioned Wisconsin High School Hockey teams compete in the Wisconsin Amateur Hockey Association.

== WIAA ==
The sanctioned teams compete from the beginning of November until the end of February with maximum number of practices and games. The sanctioned varsity teams are divided into two divisions based on school size. For each division, the champion of each of the four sections proceed to the state tournament, typically held in the Madison area.

== WAHA ==
The "club" teams

Spooner High School B State Champions 1990

Amery High School B State Champions 1991

Spooner High School C State Champions 1984

South Wood County B State Champions 1993

== State Tournament ==
The WIAA began sponsoring a tournament program in boys hockey in 1971. Superior won the first championship, defeating Madison West, 7–3, in the championship game.

The first State Tournament was held at the Dane County Coliseum in Madison. The tournament has been conducted in Madison every year except in 1974 and 1975 when it was held in Green Bay. The Hartmeyer facility in Madison has been the site of some of the State Tournaments, but the Coliseum has been used exclusively since 1980.

Superior leads in most State championships won with 13. Madison Memorial has won eight, Hudson has won six, and Madison East has won four titles.

Eighteen different schools have won State championships. Superior is the only program to win three consecutive State titles (1994–96). Superior, Madison Memorial, and Hudson are the only programs to win back-to-back titles. Superior is also the only team in Wisconsin state history to win the state tournament with a sub .500 record, finishing 14-15-1 in 2015. Going into playoffs they were 8-15-1.

Superior leads in State Tournament appearances with 37. Madison Memorial is next with 30. Northland Pines is third on the list of appearances with 19, and Stevens Point has been to State 17 times. The University School of Milwaukee, Eau Claire Memorial and Wausau West have made 15 appearances, Madison East and Hudson have made 14, and Madison West has made 12. The University School of Milwaukee leads all schools in state tournament appearances since 2000, with all 15 of the school's appearances coming since 2001.

Prior to official WIAA involvement in hockey, the Madison schools conducted an invitational from 1964 to 1970 (except for 1966). Eagle River (now Northland Pines) won the first championship, Madison East won the next three, and Superior won the last two." - quoting the WIAA website.

== Alumni ==
Every season, a "Mr. Hockey" award is given to the most outstanding player in the state as voted upon by the WHCA.

List of finalists and winners.

== WIAA Teams ==
=== Wisconsin Prep Hockey Boys ===
Team and conference data as of the 2025–26 season.

Program	Location	Nickname	Colors	Host School	Co-operative Members	Current Conference
Amery	Amery, WI	Warriors		Amery	Clayton, Clear Lake, Unity	Middle Border
Antigo	Antigo, WI	Red Robins		Antigo	Wittenberg-Birnamwood	Great Northern
Appleton	Appleton, WI	United		Appleton North	Appleton East, Appleton West	Badgerland
Aquinas/ Holmen	La Crosse, WI	Avalanche		Aquinas	Holmen, Cochrane-Fountain City, Gale-Ettrick-Trempealeau, Luther	Western Wisconsin
Arrowhead	Hartland, WI	Warhawks		Arrowhead	None	Classic 8
Ashland	Ashland, WI	Oredockers		Ashland	Hurley, Ironwood (MI), Washburn	Middle Border
Baldwin-Woodville	Baldwin, WI	Blackhawks		Baldwin-Woodville	St. Croix Central	Middle Border
Baraboo/ Portage	Baraboo, WI	Thunderbirds		Baraboo	Portage	Badger
Bay Area	Ashwaubenon, WI	Storm		Ashwaubenon	Bay Port, Pulaski, Seymour, Wrightstown	Fox River Classic
Beaver Dam	Beaver Dam, WI	Golden Beavers		Beaver Dam	Columbus, Horicon, Mayville, Randolph, Waterloo	Badger
Beloit Memorial	Beloit, WI	Purple Knights		Beloit Memorial	Brodhead, Clinton, Hononegah (IL), Parkview, The Lincoln Academy, Turner	Big Eight
Black River Falls	Black River Falls, WI	Tigers		Black River Falls	Melrose-Mindoro, Neillsville	Western Wisconsin
Brookfield	Brookfield, WI	Stars		Brookfield East	Brookfield Central, Hamilton, Menomonee Falls, Wauwatosa East, Wauwatosa West	Classic 8
Cedarburg	Cedarburg, WI	Bulldogs		Cedarburg	None	Classic 8
Chequamegon/ Phillips/ Butternut	Park Falls, WI	S.E.a.L. Hockey		Chequamegon	Butternut, Phillips	Independent
Chippewa Falls	Chippewa Falls, WI	Cardinals		Chippewa Falls	None	Big Rivers
D.C. Everest	Weston, WI	Evergreens		D.C. Everest	None	Wisconsin Valley
De Pere	De Pere, WI	Voyageurs		De Pere	West De Pere	Fox River Classic
Eau Claire Memorial	Eau Claire, WI	Old Abes		Eau Claire Memorial	None	Big Rivers
Eau Claire North	Eau Claire, WI	Huskies		Eau Claire North	None	Big Rivers
Edgewood	Madison, WI	Crusaders		Edgewood	None	Badger
Fond du Lac	Fond du Lac, WI	Cardinals		Fond du Lac	Campbellsport, Lomira, New Holstein, North Fond du Lac, Oakfield, Winnebago Lutheran	Badgerland
Fox Cities	Appleton, WI	Stars		Xavier	Brillion, Fox Valley Lutheran, Freedom, Kaukauna, Kimberly, Little Chute, New London, St. Mary Catholic	Badgerland
Hayward	Hayward, WI	Hurricanes		Hayward	Lac Courte Oreilles Ojibwe	Middle Border
Homestead	Mequon, WI	Highlanders		Homestead	None	Classic 8
Hudson	Hudson, WI	Raiders		Hudson	None	Big Rivers
Janesville	Janesville, WI	Bluebirds		Janesville Parker	Janesville Craig	Big Eight
Kenosha	Kenosha, WI	Thunder		Kenosha Bradford	Kenosha Indian Trail, Kenosha Tremper, Westosha Central, Wilmot Union	Classic 8
Kettle Moraine	Wales, WI	Lasers		Kettle Moraine	Mukwonago, Oconomowoc	Classic 8
Lakeland Union	Minocqua, WI	Thunderbirds		Lakeland Union	None	Great Northern
Madison West	Madison, WI	Regents		Madison West	None	Big Eight
Manitowoc	Manitowoc, WI	United		Manitowoc Lincoln	Manitowoc Lutheran, Mishicot, Reedsville, Roncalli, Two Rivers, Valders	Fox River Classic
Marquette University	Milwaukee, WI	Hilltoppers		Marquette University	None	Classic 8
Marshfield	Marshfield, WI	Tigers		Marshfield	Columbus Catholic	Wisconsin Valley
McFarland	McFarland, WI	Spartans		McFarland	None	Badger
Medford	Medford, WI	Red Raiders		Medford	Abbotsford, Edgar, Rib Lake	Great Northern
Menomonie	Menomonie, WI	Mustangs		Menomonie	None	Big Rivers
Merrill	Merrill, WI	Blue Jays		Merrill	None	Great Northern
Middleton	Middleton, WI	Cardinals		Middleton	None	Big Eight
Milton	Milton, WI	Red Hawks		Milton	Big Foot, Edgerton, Elkhorn, Evansville, Fort Atkinson, Whitewater, Williams Bay	Badger
Monona Grove	Monona, WI	Silver Eagles		Monona Grove	None	Badger
Monroe	Monroe, WI	Cheesemakers		Monroe	Dakota (IL), Lena-Winslow (IL), Monticello, New Glarus, Warren (IL)	Badger
Mosinee	Mosinee, WI	Indians		Mosinee	None	Great Northern
Muskego	Muskego, WI	Ice Force		Muskego	Burlington, Franklin, Greendale, Greenfield, Milwaukee Reagan Prep, Nathan Hale, New Berllin Eisenhower, New Berlin West, Oak Creek, St. Francis, Union Grove, Waterford, West Allis Central, Whitnall	Classic 8
Neenah/ Hortonville/ Menasha	Neenah, WI	Rockets		Neenah	Hortonville, Menasha, Shiocton	Badgerland
New Richmond	New Richmond, WI	Tigers		New Richmond	None	Big Rivers
Northland Pines	Eagle River, WI	Eagles		Northland Pines	None	Great Northern
Northwest	Barron, WI	Icemen		Barron	Bloomer, Cameron, Chetek-Weyerhaeuser, Cumberland, Turtle Lake	Middle Border
Notre Dame Academy	Green Bay, WI	Tritons		Notre Dame Academy	None	Fox River Classic
Onalaska/ La Crosse	Onalaska, WI	Hilltoppers		Onalaska	La Crosse Central, La Crosse Logan	Western Wisconsin
Oshkosh	Oshkosh, WI	Ice Hawks		Oshkosh North	Berlin, Green Lake, Laconia, Lourdes Academy, Omro, Oshkosh West, Ripon, Weyauwega-Fremont, Winneconne	Badgerland
Oregon	Oregon, WI	Panthers		Oregon	None	Badger
Pacelli	Stevens Point, WI	Cardinals		Pacelli	Amherst, Assumption, Newman Catholic, Rosholt	Independent
Reedsburg/ Wisconsin Dells	Reedsburg, WI	Beavers		Reedsburg	Mauston, Wisconsin Dells	Badger
Regis/ Altoona/ McDonell	Altoona, WI	Rams		Altoona	Fall Creek, McDonell Central Catholic, Regis	Middle Border
Rhinelander	Rhinelander, WI	Hodags		Rhinelander	Laona, Phelps, Three Lakes	Great Northern
Rice Lake	Rice Lake, WI	Warriors		Rice Lake	None	Big Rivers
River Falls	River Falls, WI	Wildcats		River Falls	None	Big Rivers
Sauk Prairie	Prairie du Sac, WI	Eagles		Sauk Prairie	Wisconsin Heights	Badger
Shawano/Bonduel	Shawano, WI	Hawks		Shawano	Bonduel	Independent
Sheboygan	Sheboygan, WI	Red Raiders		Sheboygan South	Cedar Grove-Belgium, Elkhart Lake-Glenbeulah, Grafton, Howards Grove, Kiel, Kohler, Oostburg, Plymouth, Port Washington, Sheboygan Christian, Sheboygan Falls, Sheboygan Lutheran, Sheboygan North	Fox River Classic
Somerset	Somerset, WI	Spartans		Somerset	St. Croix Falls	Middle Border
South Central	DeForest, WI	Navigators		DeForest	Lake Mills, Lodi, Madison Country Day, Madison East, Madison La Follette, Pardeeville, Poynette	Badger
Spooner	Spooner, WI	Rails		Spooner	Shell Lake	Middle Border
St. Mary's Springs	Fond du Lac, WI	Ledgers		St. Mary's Springs	None	Badgerland
Stevens Point	Stevens Point, WI	Panthers		Stevens Point	None	Wisconsin Valley
Stoughton	Stoughton, WI	Vikings		Stoughton	Barneveld, Lakeside Lutheran, Luther Prep, Mount Horeb	Badger
Sun Prairie	Sun Prairie, WI	United		Sun Prairie East	Sun Prairie West	Big Eight
Superior	Superior, WI	Spartans		Superior	None	Lake Superior (MSHSL)
Tomah/ Sparta	Tomah, WI	Titans		Tomah	Sparta	Western Wisconsin
Tomahawk	Tomahawk, WI	Hatchets		Tomahawk	None	Great Northern
University School	River Hills, WI	Wildcats		University School	None	Independent
Vel Phillips Memorial	Madison, WI	Spartans		Vel Phillips Memorial	None	Big Eight
Verona	Verona, WI	Wildcats		Verona	None	Big Eight
Viroqua	Viroqua, WI	Blackhawks		Viroqua	Cashton, De Soto, Westby	Western Wisconsin
Waukesha	Waukesha, WI	Wings		Waukesha North	Brookfield Academy, Catholic Memorial, Lake Country Lutheran, Pewaukee, St. John's Northwestern, Waukesha South, Waukesha West	Classic 8
Waunakee	Waunakee, WI	Warriors		Waunakee	None	Badger
Waupaca	Waupaca, WI	Comets		Waupaca	None	Great Northern
Waupun	Waupun, WI	Warriors		Waupun	None	Badgerland
Wausau West	Wausau, WI	Warriors		Wausau West	None	Wisconsin Valley
West Bend	West Bend, WI	Ice Bears		West Bend West	Germantown, Hartford Union, Kettle Moraine Lutheran, Kewaskum, Living Word Lutheran, Slinger, West Bend East	Classic 8
West Salem	West Salem, WI	Panthers		West Salem	Bangor	Western Wisconsin
Wisconsin Rapids	Wisconsin Rapids, WI	Red Raiders		Wisconsin Rapids	None	Wisconsin Valley
WNS	Whitefish Bay, WI	Storm		Whitefish Bay	Nicolet, Shorewood, Dominican, Martin Luther, Milwaukee Rufus King, St. Thomas More	Classic 8
WSFLG	Siren, WI	Blizzard		Luck	Frederic, Grantsburg, Siren, Webster	Independent

=== Wisconsin Prep Hockey Girls ===
Team and conference data as of the 2025–26 season.

Program	Location	Nickname	Colors	Host School	Co-operative Members	Current Conference
Arrowhead	Hartland, WI	Warhawks		Arrowhead	Hamilton, Kettle Moraine, Oconomowoc, Waterford	Eastern Shores
Badger	Prairie du Sac, WI	Lightning		Sauk Prairie	Baraboo, Mauston, Portage, Reedsburg, Wisconsin Dells	Badger
Bay Area	De Pere, WI	Ice Bears		De Pere	Ashwaubenon, Bay Port, Green Bay East, Green Bay Preble, Green Bay Southwest, Green Bay West, Notre Dame Academy, Pulaski, Seymour, West De Pere	Eastern Shores
Beaver Dam	Beaver Dam, WI	Golden Beavers		Beaver Dam	Columbus, Dodgeland, Fall River, Horicon, Lomira, Mayville, Randolph	Badger
Black River Falls	Black River Falls, WI	Tigers		Black River Falls	Granton, Melrose-Mindoro, Neillsville, Sparta, Tomah, Whitehall	Wisconsin Valley
Brookfield	Brookfield, WI	Glacier		Brookfield Central	Brookfield Academy, Brookfield East, Burlington, Catholic Memorial, Chesterton Academy, Franklin, Greendale, Greenfield, Menomonee Falls, Mukwonago, Muskego, Nathan Hale, New Berlin Eisenhower, New Berlin West, Oak Creek, Pewaukee, Union Grove, Waukesha North, Waukesha South, Waukesha West, Wauwatosa East, Wauwatosa West, West Allis Central	Eastern Shores
Cap City	Sun Prairie, WI	Cougars		Sun Prairie West	DeForest, Madison East, Madison La Follette, Sun Prairie East, Waunakee	Badger
Central Wisconsin	Wausau, WI	Storm		D.C. Everest	Mosinee, Wausau East, Wausau West	Wisconsin Valley
Chippewa Falls	Chippewa Falls, WI	Cardinals		Chippewa Falls	McDonell Central Catholic, Menomonie	Big Rivers
Coulee Region	West Salem, WI	Cyclones		West Salem	Aquinas, Bangor, Gale-Ettrick-Trempealeau, Holmen, La Crosse Central, La Crosse Logan, Luther, Onalaska	Independent
Eau Claire Area	Eau Claire, WI	Stars		Eau Claire North	Altoona, Eau Claire Memorial, Fall Creek	Big Rivers
Fond du Lac	Fond du Lac, WI	Warbirds		Fond du Lac	Campbellsport, Kewaskum, Kohler, Omro, Oshkosh North, Oshkosh West, Plymouth, Sheboygan Falls, Sheboygan North, Sheboygan South, St. Mary's Springs, Valders, Waupun, Winnebago Lutheran	Eastern Shores
Fox Cities	Appleton, WI	Stars		Xavier	Appleton East, Appleton North, Appleton West, Brillion, Fox Valley Lutheran, Freedom, Hortonville, Kaukauna, Kimberly, Menasha, Neenah, Reedsville, St. Mary Catholic, Winneconne, Wrightstown	Eastern Shores
Hayward	Hayward, WI	Hurricanes		Hayward	Ashland, Barron, Cumberland, Rice Lake, Shell Lake, Siren and Spooner	Independent
Hudson	Hudson, WI	Raiders		Hudson	None	Big Rivers
Janesville	Janesville, WI	Bluebirds		Janesville Parker	Beloit Memorial, Belvidere (IL), Brodhead, Clinton, Edgerton, Hononegah (IL), Janesville Craig, Milton, Monroe, The Lincoln Academy, Turner	Badger
Lakeshore	Mequon, WI	Lightning		Cedarburg	Cedar Grove-Belgium, Germantown, Grafton, Hartford Union, Homestead, Port Washington, Slinger, West Bend East, West Bend West	Eastern Shores
Medford	Medford, WI	Red Raiders		Medford	Rib Lake	Wisconsin Valley
Metro	Verona, WI	Lynx		Middleton	Edgewood, Madison West, Mount Horeb, Vel Phillips Memorial, Verona	Badger
Northland Pines	Eagle River, WI	Eagles		Northland Pines	Antigo, Bessemer (MI), Hurley, Ironwood (MI), Lakeland Union, Norway (MI), Rhinelander, Three Lakes, Wabeno, Wakefield-Marenisco (MI)	Wisconsin Valley
River Falls	River Falls, WI	Wildcats		River Falls	Baldwin-Woodville, St. Croix Central	Big Rivers
Stoughton	Stoughton, WI	Icebergs		Stoughton	Cambridge, Evansville, Lodi, McFarland, Monona Grove, Oregon, Poynette	Badger
Superior	Superior, WI	Spartans		Superior	Northwestern	Lake Superior (MSHSL)
University School	River Hills, WI	Wildcats		University School	DSHA, Dominican, Milwaukee Reagan Prep, Milwaukee Rufus King, Nicolet, Shorewood, St. Thomas More, Whitefish Bay	Eastern Shores
Viroqua	Viroqua, WI	Blackhawks		Viroqua	Cashton, Westby, Youth Initiative	Badger
Western Wisconsin	Somerset, WI	Stars		Somerset	Amery, New Richmond, Osceola, St. Croix Falls	Big Rivers
Wisconsin Valley Union	Stevens Point, WI	Eagles		Stevens Point	Amherst, Assumption, Auburndale, Columbus Catholic, Marshfield, Pacelli, Spencer, Waupaca, Wisconsin Rapids	Wisconsin Valley

== WAHA Club Teams ==
School	Nickname	Colors	Championships
Amery	Warriors	Red, White	1991
Beloit	Raptors	Maroon and White	2014, 2017, 2021, 2022
De Pere	Voyageurs	Blue and Bronze	1983, 1986, 1989, 1990, 1993, 2000, 2002, 2003
Dodgeville	Ice Wolves	Blue, White, Black	2024
Appleton	Wizards	Green, Blue, White	2007
Ashwaubenon	Jaguars	Green and Gold	1988, 1992, 1998, 2001
Green Bay United	Gryphons	Black and Gold	2025
Kenosha	Komets	Red, Black, Orange, White	2008, 2009, 2010, 2012, 2023, 2026
Marinette/Menominee	Thunder	Blue, Green, White	2015, 2016
Monroe	Avalanche	Blue, Red, White	2011
Wisconsin Rapids	Bulldogs	Red, Black and White	
Southeastern Hockey Association of Wisconsin	Timberwolves	Black, White, Red	2019
Sheboygan	Lakers	Blue, Silver (old); Navy, Gold (new)	2001 (B-Division and C-Division), 2002 (C-Division), 2004 (B-Division), , 2005 (B-Division) , 2006 (B-Division)
West Bend	Ice	Black, White, North Dakota Green (old); Black, Green (new)	2004, 2005, 2006
