= Eastern Shores Hockey Conference =

Wisconsin high school hockey conference

The Eastern Shores Hockey Conference is a high school athletic conference sponsoring girls hockey. Founded in 2010, its membership is concentrated in eastern Wisconsin and is affiliated with the Wisconsin Interscholastic Athletic Association.

== History ==
The Eastern Shores Hockey Conference was started in 2010 by seven girls high school hockey programs in the eastern half of Wisconsin: Appleton United, Arrowhead, Bay Area Ice Bears, Beaver Dam, Brookfield Glacier, Fond du Lac Warbirds and University School. An eighth school was added the next year when the Fox Cities Stars co-operative joined the loop. The conference has operated with eight members for most of its history with only two further membership changes. Beaver Dam left the conference in 2017 when they moved all varsity sports to the Badger Conference and were replaced by the Lakeshore Lightning co-operative in Mequon. The next year, Appleton United joined the Fox Cities Stars co-operative and the Wisconsin Valley Union co-operative (based in Stevens Point) took their place. They remained members of the Eastern Shores until 2025, when they joined the Wisconsin Valley Conference.

== List of conference members ==
=== Current members ===
Program	Location	Nickname	Colors	Host School	Co-operative Members	Joined
Arrowhead	Hartland, WI	Warhawks		Arrowhead	Hamilton, Kettle Moraine, Oconomowoc, Waterford	2010
Bay Area	De Pere, WI	Ice Bears		De Pere	Ashwaubenon, Bay Port, Green Bay East, Green Bay Preble, Green Bay Southwest, Green Bay West, Notre Dame Academy, Pulaski, Seymour, West De Pere	2010
Brookfield	Brookfield, WI	Glacier		Brookfield Central	Brookfield East, Brookfield Academy, Burlington, Catholic Memorial, Chesterton Academy, Franklin, Greendale, Greenfield, Menomonee Falls, Mukwonago, Muskego, Nathan Hale, New Berlin Eisenhower, New Berlin West, Oak Creek, Pewaukee, Union Grove, Waukesha North, Waukesha South, Waukesha West, Wauwatosa East, Wauwatosa West, West Allis Central	2010
Fond du Lac	Fond du Lac, WI	Warbirds		Fond du Lac	Campbellsport, Kewaskum, Kohler, Omro, Oshkosh North, Oshkosh West, Plymouth, Sheboygan Falls, Sheboygan North, Sheboygan South, St. Mary's Springs, Valders, Waupun, Winnebago Lutheran	2010
Fox Cities	Appleton, WI	Stars		Xavier	Appleton East, Appleton North, Appleton West, Brillion, Fox Valley Lutheran, Freedom, Hortonville, Kaukauna, Kimberly, Menasha, Neenah, Reedsville, St. Mary Catholic, Winneconne, Wrightstown	2011
Lakeshore	Mequon, WI	Lightning		Cedarburg	Cedar Grove-Belgium, Germantown, Grafton, Hartford Union, Homestead, Port Washington, Slinger, West Bend East, West Bend West	2017
University School	River Hills, WI	Wildcats		University School	DSHA, Dominican, Milwaukee Reagan Prep, Milwaukee Rufus King, Nicolet, Shorewood, St. Thomas More, Whitefish Bay	2010

=== Former members ===
Program	Location	Nickname	Colors	Host School	Co-operative Members	Joined	Left
Appleton	Appleton, WI	United		Appleton East	Appleton North, Appleton West	2010	2018
Beaver Dam	Beaver Dam, WI	Golden Beavers		Beaver Dam	Columbus, Dodgeland, Horicon, Mayville, Randolph	2010	2017
Wisconsin Valley Union	Stevens Point, WI	Eagles		Stevens Point	Amherst, Assumption, Columbus Catholic, Marshfield, Pacelli, Waupaca, Wisconsin Rapids	2018	2025

== Membership map ==
Eastern Shores Hockey Conference
Location of Eastern Shores Hockey Conference members:
1 Arrowhead
2 Bay Area Ice Bears
3 Brookfield Glacier
4 Fond du Lac Warbirds
5 Fox Cities Stars
6 Lakeshore Lightning
7 University School

== List of state champions ==
Program	Year
Bay Area	2014
University School	2015
Fox Cities	2018
Fox Cities	2019
Fox Cities	2020
Bay Area	2023
Bay Area	2025
Bay Area	2026

== List of conference champions ==
Program	Quantity	Years
Bay Area	8	2012, 2014, 2020, 2022, 2023, 2024, 2025, 2026
University School	4	2015, 2016, 2018, 2023
Fond du Lac	3	2011, 2017, 2019
Arrowhead	1	2011
Brookfield	1	2013
Fox Cities	1	2021
Appleton United	0	
Beaver Dam	0	
Lakeshore	0	
Wisconsin Valley Union		
