= Little Seven Conference (Wisconsin) =

Wisconsin high school athletic conference (1926-1934)

The Little Seven Conference is a former high school athletic conference with its membership concentrated in southeastern Wisconsin. Competing from 1926 to 1934, its members belonged to the Wisconsin Interscholastic Athletic Association.

== History ==
Location of Original Little Seven Conference Members

The Little Seven Conference, known as the Little Five Conference during its first season, was formed by five small high schools on the periphery of metropolitan Milwaukee in 1926: Hartland, Menomonee Falls, North Milwaukee, Oconomowoc and Pewaukee. Cedarburg and Port Washington joined after the first season, which is when the conference assumed the Little Seven name. In 1928, Norris Foundation became the eighth school to join the conference, but the Little Seven name remained in place despite the conference's expansion. In 1929, the village of North Milwaukee was annexed into the city of Milwaukee along with the high school, which joined the Milwaukee Public Schools district. Out of a desire to avoid confusion between North Milwaukee High School and the nearby North Division High School, North Milwaukee was renamed Custer High School after the original street it resided on. In 1930, the Little Seven lost four schools: Custer to the Milwaukee City Conference, Hartland to the Little Six Conference, Oconomowoc to the Little Ten Conference and Port Washington to compete independent of conference affiliation. By the time Norris Foundation left to join the Southeastern Wisconsin Conference in 1932, the Little Seven had ended sponsorship of a basketball league and its last vestige was an annual triangular track meet between the remaining participants. The Little Seven officially ended competition in 1934, when Cedarburg, Menomonee Falls and Pewaukee joined with Juneau High School in Dodge County to form the 4-C Conference.

== Conference membership history ==
=== Final members ===
School	Location	Affiliation	Mascot	Colors	Joined	Left	Conference Joined	Current Conference
Cedarburg	Cedarburg, WI	Public	Bulldogs		1927	1934	4-C	North Shore
Menomonee Falls	Menomonee Falls, WI	Public	Indians		1926	1934	4-C	Greater Metro
Pewaukee	Pewaukee, WI	Public	Pirates		1926	1934	4-C	Woodland

=== Previous members ===
School	Location	Affiliation	Mascot	Colors	Joined	Left	Conference Joined	Current Conference
Hartland	Hartland, WI	Public	Trojans		1926	1930	Little Five	Closed in 1956 (consolidated into Arrowhead)
Norris Foundation	Mukwonago, WI	Public, Alternative	Nors'men		1928	1932	Southeastern Wisconsin	Dropped athletics in 1982
North Milwaukee	North Milwaukee, WI	Public	Indians		1926	1930	Milwaukee City	
Oconomowoc	Oconomowoc, WI	Public	Raccoons		1926	1930	Little Ten	Classic 8
Port Washington	Port Washington, WI	Public	Pirates		1927	1930	Independent	Glacier Trails

== List of conference champions ==
=== Boys Basketball ===
School	Quantity	Years
Oconomowoc	2	1927, 1928
Pewaukee	2	1926, 1931
North Milwaukee	1	1930
Port Washington	1	1929
Cedarburg	0	
Hartland	0	
Menomonee Falls	0	
Norris Foundation	0	
