= ECRC =

ECRC may stand for:

Sport

- Eastern Canadian Ringette Championships
- Eastern Collegiate Racquetball Conference
- East Coast Rugby Conference, a college rugby competition in the United States
- East Coast Rowing Council, represents coastal rowing clubs off the east coast of Ireland

Other

- Enron Creditors Recovery Corp., liquidated Enron's assets
- Edinburgh Cancer Research Centre
- Expeditionary Combat Readiness Center, a support organisation in the U.S. Navy
- Eastern Counties Road Car Company, a bus company in Ipswich, England — merged into the Eastern Counties Omnibus Company
