= PWHS =

PWHS may refer to:

- Parkway West High School (Ballwin, Missouri), Ballwin, Missouri
- Parkway West High School (Philadelphia, Pennsylvania), Philadelphia, Pennsylvania
- Plymouth-Whitemarsh High School, Plymouth Meeting, Pennsylvania
- Port Washington High School (disambiguation page)
  - Port Washington High School (Wisconsin), Port Washington, Wisconsin
  - Paul D. Schreiber High School, sometimes referred to as Port Washington High School, Port Washington, New York
- Portsmouth West High School, West Portsmouth, Ohio
- Proviso West High School, Hillside, Illinois
