= Little Ten Conference (Wisconsin) =

Wisconsin high school athletic conference (1925-1970)

The Little Ten Conference is a former high school athletic conference in Wisconsin, formed in 1925 and reorganizing into the Wisconsin Little Ten Conference in 1970.

== History ==
=== 1925–1959 ===
Location of Original Little Ten Conference Members

The Little Ten Conference was founded in 1925 by ten medium- to smaller-sized schools in south central Wisconsin: Beaver Dam, Berlin, Columbus, Hartford Union, Horicon, Mayville, Portage, Ripon, Watertown and Waupun. The conference went through a few membership changes during its first few seasons, starting with the loss of Portage to the South Central Conference in 1926 and Watertown to the Southern Six in 1928. The conference added West Bend in 1929 and Oconomowoc in 1930 to bring conference membership back up to ten. During the late 1940s and early 1950s, several schools in the northern and western suburbs of the Milwaukee area (Cedarburg, Menomonee Falls, Port Washington and former members Watertown) applied for membership in the Little Ten multiple times, only to be rejected at each attempt over concerns about managing a fourteen-member conference. This series of rejections led to the formation of the Braveland Conference in 1953 by the four failed Little Ten applicants. The Little Ten would finally expand its membership roster in 1959, when Arrowhead joined from the Southeastern Wisconsin Conference and Watertown rejoined from the Braveland Conference.

=== 1959–1970 ===
With conference membership increasing to twelve, the Little Ten subdivided into Northern and Southern Divisions for the 1959-60 school year:

Northern Little Ten	Southern Little Ten
Berlin	Arrowhead
Columbus	Beaver Dam
Horicon	Hartford Union
Mayville	Oconomowoc
Ripon	Watertown
Waupun	West Bend

Location of Final Little Ten Conference Members

In 1965, Arrowhead left to join the Southeastern Badger Conference, bringing conference membership to eleven. By the late 1960s, increasing gaps in enrollment between the smaller schools in the Northern Little Ten and the larger schools in the Southern Little Ten were creating problems with competitive balance, and the schools in the Southern Little Ten began looking to secede from the conference. The conference officially subdivided into two separate conferences in 1966 and both conferences completely disbanded in 1970. The five Southern Little Ten members (six with the split of West Bend into East and West) joined with Waupun, who had the highest enrollment in the Northern Little Ten, to form the Wisconsin Little Ten Conference. The five schools in the Northern Little Ten disbanded to find other conferences with schools more similar in enrollment size.

== Conference membership history ==
=== Final members ===
School	Location	Affiliation	Mascot	Colors	Joined	Left	Conference Joined	Current Conference
Beaver Dam	Beaver Dam, WI	Public	Golden Beavers		1925	1970	Wisconsin Little Ten	Badger
Berlin	Berlin, WI	Public	Indians		1925	1970	East Central	South Central
Columbus	Columbus, WI	Public	Cardinals		1925	1970	Central Suburban	Capitol
Hartford Union	Hartford, WI	Public	Orioles		1925	1970	Wisconsin Little Ten	North Shore
Horicon	Horicon, WI	Public	Marshmen		1925	1970	Flyway	Trailways
Mayville	Mayville, WI	Public	Cardinals		1925	1970	Scenic Moraine	Wisconsin Flyway
Oconomowoc	Oconomowoc, WI	Public	Raccoons		1930	1970	Wisconsin Little Ten	Classic Eight
Ripon	Ripon, WI	Public	Tigers		1925	1970	East Central	South Central
Watertown	Watertown, WI	Public	Goslings		1925, 1959	1928, 1970	Southern Six, Wisconsin Little Ten	Badger
Waupun	Waupun, WI	Public	Warriors		1925	1970	Wisconsin Little Ten	Capitol
West Bend (Note: Split into West Bend East and West Bend West High Schools prior to the 1970-71 school year.)	West Bend, WI	Public	Badgers		1929	1970	Wisconsin Little Ten	Glacier Trails

=== Previous members ===
School	Location	Affiliation	Mascot	Colors	Joined	Left	Conference Joined	Current Conference
Arrowhead	Hartland, WI	Public	Warhawks		1959	1965	Southeastern Badger	Classic Eight
Portage	Portage, WI	Public	Warriors		1925	1926	Southern Six	Badger

== Membership timeline ==
Northern Little Ten Southern Little Ten

== List of state champions ==
=== Fall sports ===
None

=== Winter sports ===
Boys Basketball
School	Year	Division
Watertown	1928	Single Division
Mayville	1935	Class B
Beaver Dam	1937	Class B

=== Spring sports ===
Baseball
School	Year	Division
West Bend	1951	Single Division
Oconomowoc	1959	Single Division

Boys Track & Field
School	Year	Division
Berlin	1931	Class B
West Bend	1934	Class B
Horicon	1937	Class C
Horicon	1938	Class C
Horicon	1939	Class C
Horicon	1954	Class C
Horicon	1959	Class C
Berlin	1961	Class B
Arrowhead	1965	Class B
Ripon	1968	Class B

== List of conference champions ==
=== Boys Basketball ===
School	Quantity	Years
Mayville	11	1932, 1933, 1934, 1935, 1938, 1939, 1960, 1961, 1962, 1969, 1970
Beaver Dam	10	1927, 1937, 1938, 1941, 1942, 1943, 1946, 1948, 1960, 1966
Oconomowoc	9	1932, 1938, 1946, 1951, 1956, 1957, 1959, 1962, 1968
Watertown	8	1928, 1960, 1961, 1963, 1964, 1967, 1969, 1970
Columbus	7	1929, 1932, 1954, 1963, 1964, 1965, 1968
Ripon	7	1926, 1931, 1932, 1938, 1949, 1950, 1966
Hartford Union	6	1936, 1947, 1951, 1952, 1953, 1958
Horicon	4	1936, 1940, 1941, 1945
Waupun	4	1930, 1944, 1955, 1967
West Bend	2	1958, 1965
Berlin	1	1946
Arrowhead	0	
Portage	0	

=== Football ===
School	Quantity	Years
Oconomowoc	11	1942, 1946, 1951, 1952, 1955, 1958, 1959, 1964, 1965, 1967, 1969
Beaver Dam	10	1928, 1933, 1940, 1947, 1948, 1954, 1955, 1956, 1957, 1963
West Bend	10	1933, 1934, 1950, 1951, 1958, 1961, 1962, 1964, 1966, 1969
Mayville	9	1929, 1930, 1931, 1933, 1935, 1936, 1938, 1944, 1968
Ripon	8	1930, 1932, 1936, 1937, 1939, 1941, 1943, 1947
Berlin	6	1945, 1953, 1954, 1956, 1961, 1967
Waupun	6	1925, 1926, 1960, 1963, 1965, 1966
Horicon	3	1932, 1959, 1969
Columbus	2	1962, 1964
Hartford Union	2	1940, 1968
Portage	1	1927
Watertown	1	1960
Arrowhead	0	
