= Badgerland Hockey Conference =

Wisconsin high school hockey conference

The Badgerland Hockey Conference is a high school athletic conference sponsoring boys hockey. Founded in 1984, its membership is concentrated in the Fox Valley region of Wisconsin and is affiilated with the Wisconsin Interscholastic Athletic Association.

== History ==
=== 1984-1999 ===
Location of Original Badgerland Hockey Conference members

The Badgerland Hockey Conference was formed in 1984 by six high schools in south central Wisconsin: Edgewood in Madison, Fond du Lac, Middleton, Monona Grove, Stoughton and Waupun. The five public schools in the conference were members of the Wisconsin Amateur Hockey Association, since the conference wasn't initially sponsored by the WIAA. The only private school in the conference, Edgewood, was part of the Wisconsin Independent Schools Athletic Association. Beaver Dam became members of the conference in 1988, a few years after starting their interscholastic hockey program. In 1990, Edgewood left the Badgerland to compete in the Independent High School Hockey League against other private schools. They were replaced a year later by the newly created varsity programs at McFarland and Verona. In 1993, McFarland gained a co-operative partner for hockey in Oregon, and a year later, Middleton exited the Badgerland when they received an invitation to join the Big Eight Conference for all varsity sports including hockey. They were replaced by Waunakee, who started their program the previous year. The Badgerland Hockey Conference made further inroads into the Fox Valley region in the late 1990s, adding Neenah in 1996 and the Appleton United co-operative program a year later. Coupled with the entry of Reedsburg into the conference, this brought membership up to eleven schools.

=== 1999-2010 ===
Location of Badgerland Hockey Conference members (2007-2010)

In 1999, the all-sport Badger Conference began sponsorship of boys hockey, and the Badgerland Hockey Conference lost six of its eleven programs to the new loop: McFarland/Oregon, Monona Grove, Reedsburg, Stoughton, Verona and Waunakee. This changed the conference's membership footprint significantly, with most of its members now located in the Fox Valley. The addition of University School of Milwaukee to the conference's roster brought membership up to six schools, and Sheboygan's entry the following year put that figure at seven members until the Badgerland's next major realignment. In 2006, the conference added three programs in the Green Bay metropolitan area (De Pere Voyageurs, Green Bay United and Notre Dame Academy) and lost University School to independent status. The nine Badgerland members were also realigned into Northern and Southern divisions:

Northern Division	Southern Division
De Pere Voyageurs	Appleton United
Green Bay United	Beaver Dam
Notre Dame Academy	Fond du Lac
Sheboygan Red Raiders	Neenah
	Waupun

The entry of the Bay Port/Pulaski co-operative into the Northern Division in 2007 put membership at ten, where it would stay until 2009, when the Badgerland added four programs (Ashwaubenon, Fox Cities Stars, Oshkosh Ice Hawks and St. Mary's Springs) to bring it to a high of fourteen member schools.

=== 2010-present ===
For the 2010–2011 season, the Badgerland Hockey Conference lost six of seven Northern Division members when the Fox River Classic Conference started hockey sponsorship: Ashwaubenon, Bay Port/Pulaski, De Pere Voyageurs, Green Bay United, Notre Dame Academy and Sheboygan Red Raiders. The only remaining program from that division (St. Mary's Springs) joined the seven Southern Division schools in the revised lineup. This roster would remain intact until 2017, when Beaver Dam joined the Badger Conference as a full member. They were replaced by Pacelli in Stevens Point, but this only lasted for one season before resuming independent status the following year. Aside from a short stint by Shawano/Bonduel for the 2021–22 season, the Badgerland Hockey Conference has maintained its membership roster at seven members.

== List of member programs ==
=== Current programs ===
Program	Location	Nickname	Colors	Host School	Co-operative Members	Joined
Appleton	Appleton, WI	United		Appleton North	Appleton East, Appleton West	1997
Fond du Lac	Fond du Lac, WI	Cardinals		Fond du Lac	Campbellsport, Lomira, New Holstein, North Fond du Lac, Oakfield, Winnebago Lutheran	1984
Fox Cities	Appleton, WI	Stars		Xavier	Brillion, Fox Valley Lutheran, Freedom, Kaukauna, Kimberly, Little Chute, New London, St. Mary Catholic	2009
Neenah	Neenah, WI	Rockets		Neenah	Hortonville, Menasha, Shiocton	1996
Oshkosh	Oshkosh, WI	Ice Hawks		Oshkosh North	Berlin, Green Lake, Laconia, Lourdes Academy, Omro, Oshkosh West, Weyauwega-Fremont, Winneconne	2009
St. Mary's Springs	Fond du Lac, WI	Ledgers		St. Mary's Springs	None	2009
Waupun	Waupun, WI	Warriors		Waupun	None	1984

=== Former programs ===
Program	Location	Nickname	Colors	Host School	Co-operative Members	Joined	Left
Ashwaubenon	Ashwaubenon, WI	Jaguars		Ashwaubenon	Seymour, Wrightstown	2009	2010
Bay Port/ Pulaski	Suamico, WI	Pirates		Bay Port	Pulaski	2007	2010
Beaver Dam	Beaver Dam, WI	Golden Beavers		Beaver Dam	Columbus, Horicon, Mayville, Randolph, Waterloo	1988	2017
De Pere	De Pere, WI	Voyageurs		De Pere	West De Pere	2006	2010
Edgewood	Madison, WI	Crusaders		Edgewood	None	1984	1990
Green Bay United	Green Bay, WI	Gryphons		Green Bay Southwest	Green Bay East, Green Bay Preble, Green Bay West	2006	2010
McFarland	McFarland, WI	Spartans		McFarland	Oregon (1993–1999)	1991	1999
Middleton	Middleton, WI	Cardinals		Middleton	None	1984	1994
Monona Grove	Monona, WI	Silver Eagles		Monona Grove	None	1984	1999
Notre Dame Academy	Green Bay, WI	Tritons		Notre Dame Academy	None	2006	2010
Pacelli	Stevens Point, WI	Cardinals		Pacelli	Amherst, Assumption, Rosholt	2017	2018
Reedsburg	Reedsburg, WI	Beavers		Reedsburg	Mauston, Wisconsin Dells	1997	1999
Shawano	Shawano, WI	Hawks		Shawano	Bonduel	2021	2022
Sheboygan	Sheboygan, WI	Red Raiders		Sheboygan South	Sheboygan North, Cedar Grove-Belgium, Elkhart Lake-Glenbeulah, Grafton, Howards Grove, Kiel, Kohler, Oostburg, Plymouth, Port Washington, Sheboygan Christian, Sheboygan Falls, Sheboygan Lutheran	2000	2010
Stoughton	Stoughton, WI	Vikings		Stoughton	Barneveld, Luther Prep, Mount Horeb	1984	1999
University School	River Hills, WI	Wildcats		University School	None	1999	2006
Verona	Verona, WI	Wildcats		Verona	None	1991	1999
Waunakee	Waunakee, WI	Warriors		Waunakee	None	1994	1999

== Membership timeline ==
Northern Division Southern Division

== Membership map ==
Badgerland Hockey Conference
Location of Badgerland Hockey Conference members:
1 Appleton United
2 Fond du Lac
3 Fox Cities Stars
4 Neenah
5 Oshkosh Ice Hawks
6 St. Mary's Springs
7 Waupun

== List of state champions ==
Program	Year	Division
University School	2006	
Fond du Lac	2007	
Appleton United	2016	
St. Mary's Springs	2020	Division 2
St. Mary's Springs	2021	Division 2
St. Mary's Springs	2024	Division 2

== List of conference champions ==
Program	Quantity	Years
Fond du Lac	10	1985, 1991, 1992, 1995, 1999, 2000, 2003, 2004, 2007, 2013
Appleton United	6	2007, 2008, 2009, 2010, 2014, 2015
Neenah	6	2003, 2016, 2017, 2019, 2025, 2026
St. Mary's Springs	6	2011, 2020, 2021, 2022, 2023, 2024
Waupun	5	1993, 1994, 1995, 1996, 2018
Edgewood	4	1986, 1987, 1989, 1990
University School	4	2001, 2002, 2005, 2006
Monona Grove	2	1997, 1998
Bay Port/ Pulaski	1	2008
Fox Cities	1	2012
Middleton	1	1988
Sheboygan	1	2007
Waunakee	1	1997
Ashwaubenon	0	
Beaver Dam	0	
De Pere	0	
Green Bay United	0	
McFarland	0	
McFarland/ Oregon	0	
Notre Dame Academy	0	
Oshkosh	0	
Pacelli	0	
Reedsburg	0	
Shawano/ Bonduel	0	
Stoughton	0	
Verona	0	
