= 4-C Conference =

Wisconsin high school athletic conference (1934-1953)

The Four County Conference, more commonly known as the 4-C Conference, is a former high school athletic conference in Wisconsin. Formed in 1934 and disbanded in 1953, its membership was concentrated in southeastern Wisconsin, northwest of the Milwaukee area. All members were affiliated with the Wisconsin Interscholastic Athletic Association.

== History ==
Location of 4-C Conference Members (1935-1953)

The 4-C Conference was organized in 1934 by four small high schools on the outskirts of the Milwaukee suburbs: Cedarburg, Juneau, Menomonee Falls and Pewaukee. The conference was named after the four counties in southeastern Wisconsin (Dodge, Ozaukee, Washington and Waukesha) where member schools were located. Hartland joined from the Little Five and Slinger joined from the Fox Valley Tri-County League in 1935, bringing conference membership to six schools. Grafton was also invited to join the 4-C Conference that year, but ultimately decided to remain in the Kettle Moraine Conference. The 4-C Conference operated as a six-member circuit for eighteen years before disbanding in 1953. Cedarburg and Menomonee Falls, the two largest schools in the conference, had previously submitted multiple bids to join the Little Ten Conference dating back to 1947, all of which were rejected. Both schools joined with longtime independents (and fellow failed Little Ten applicants) Port Washington and Watertown to form the Braveland Conference and dropped any further pursuit of Little Ten membership. Three of the remaining schools (Hartland, Pewaukee and Slinger) joined the Southeastern Wisconsin Conference, and Juneau became members of the Madison Suburban Conference.

== Conference membership history ==
| School | Location | Affiliation | Mascot | Colors | Joined | Left | Conference Joined | Current Conference |
|---|---|---|---|---|---|---|---|---|
| Cedarburg | Cedarburg, WI | Public | Bulldogs | | 1934 | 1953 | Braveland | North Shore |
| Hartland | Hartland, WI | Public | Trojans | | 1935 | 1953 | Southeastern Wisconsin | Closed in 1956 (replaced by Arrowhead) |
| Juneau | Juneau, WI | Public | Chiefs | | 1934 | 1953 | Madison Suburban | Closed in 1969 (merged into Dodgeland) |
| Menomonee Falls | Menomonee Falls, WI | Public | Indians | | 1934 | 1953 | Braveland | Greater Metro |
| Pewaukee | Pewaukee, WI | Public | Pirates | | 1934 | 1953 | Southeastern Wisconsin | Woodland |
| Slinger | Slinger, WI | Public | Redmen | | 1935 | 1953 | Southeastern Wisconsin | North Shore |

== List of conference champions ==
=== Boys Basketball ===
| School | Quantity | Years |
|---|---|---|
| Menomonee Falls | 7 | 1937, 1938, 1939, 1945, 1949, 1950, 1951 |
| Cedarburg | 6 | 1943, 1944, 1947, 1950, 1952, 1953 |
| Hartland | 5 | 1940, 1941, 1942, 1946, 1948 |
| Juneau | 3 | 1935, 1936, 1939 |
| Pewaukee | 0 | |
| Slinger | 0 | |

=== Football ===
| School | Quantity | Years |
|---|---|---|
| Cedarburg | 10 | 1935, 1938, 1941, 1942, 1946, 1947, 1948, 1949, 1951, 1952 |
| Juneau | 5 | 1935, 1936, 1938, 1939, 1940 |
| Menomonee Falls | 4 | 1935, 1937, 1945, 1950 |
| Hartland | 0 | |
| Pewaukee | 0 | |
| Slinger | 0 | |
Champions from 1943 and 1944 unknown
