= Braveland Conference =

Wisconsin high school athletic conference (1953-1993)

The Braveland Conference is a former high school athletic conference in Wisconsin, formed in 1953 and ending competition in 1993. Its membership was concentrated in the Milwaukee metropolitan area and members were affiliated with the Wisconsin Interscholastic Athletic Association.

== History ==
=== 1953–1955 ===
Location of Original Braveland Conference Members

The Braveland Conference was formed in 1953 by four high schools in the outer suburbs of Milwaukee: Cedarburg, Menomonee Falls, Port Washington and Watertown. Cedarburg and Menomonee Falls had previously been members of the 4-C Conference, and Port Washington and Watertown competed independent of conference affiliation. It was formed after several failed attempts by the four original members to join the Little Ten Conference, dating back to the late 1940s. The Braveland Conference was named after the National League's Milwaukee Braves, who had just relocated from Boston a few months earlier.

=== 1955–1963 ===
Due to the rapid growth around the Milwaukee area occurring after World War II, new high schools and districts began to pop up in and around Milwaukee County to meet the added demand. In 1955, Salem Central in western Kenosha County joined the conference, followed by Brookfield and Nicolet in 1956. Salem Central left in 1958 to join the Southeastern Wisconsin Conference and cut down on the long travel distances to Milwaukee’s northern suburbs that they had been experiencing as Braveland members. They were replaced by the new high schools in Granville and Muskego that same year. Oak Creek joined the conference in 1959, just as Watertown left to rejoin the Little Ten Conference. In 1961, the conference added six schools: Brookfield East, Greendale (formerly of the Suburban Conference), Greenfield, Homestead, New Berlin and Whitnall. Brookfield East and New Berlin joined as junior varsity members before attaining full membership in 1962. To accommodate this growth, the conference split into two divisions.

Northern Braveland	Southern Braveland
Cedarburg	Brookfield Central
Granville	Greendale
Homestead	Greenfield
Menomonee Falls	Muskego
Nicolet	Oak Creek
Port Washington	Whitnall

In 1962, Brookfield East and New Berlin joined as full members, and they were placed in the Southern Braveland. The newly renamed Brookfield Central shifted to the Northern Braveland to accommodate the expansion. Hamilton High School in Sussex joined that same year as a junior varsity member.

Northern Braveland	Southern Braveland
Brookfield Central	Brookfield East
Cedarburg	Greendale
Granville	Greenfield
Homestead	Muskego
Menomonee Falls	New Berlin
Nicolet	Oak Creek
Port Washington	Whitnall

=== 1963–1980 ===
Location of Braveland Conference Members (1969-1980)

The influx of new high schools in the Milwaukee area led both the Braveland and Suburban Conferences to begin discussing realignment options in the early 1960s. With three more high schools set to join as full members in 1963 (Franklin, Hamilton and St. Francis), conference leadership decided that a seventeen-member conference was too unwieldy to continue. The eight members in the southern suburbs left to form what later became the Parkland Conference: Franklin, Greendale, Greenfield, Muskego, New Berlin, Oak Creek, St. Francis and Whitnall. Their departure solidified the Braveland as a conference for the Milwaukee area's northern second-ring suburban schools. In 1966, Granville High School changed its name to Brown Deer High School, due in part to annexation of the formerly unincorporated town of Granville into the city of Milwaukee a few years earlier. Conference membership increased to ten in 1969 with the split of Menomonee Falls High School into Menomonee Falls East and Menomonee Falls North.

=== 1980–1985 ===
After years of discussion on high school conference realignment without any sort of resolution, the WIAA presented a sweeping realignment plan for southeastern Wisconsin to take effect for the 1980-81 school year. Two conferences were dissolved (the Scenic Moraine and South Shore) and four of the thirteen displaced schools joined the Braveland, bringing membership to fourteen. Arrowhead, Germantown and Grafton joined from the Scenic Moraine and Kenosha Bradford from the South Shore. The Braveland Conference competed as a single division for most sports with the exception of football, which subdivided into two groups that were originally referred to Division A and Division B:

Football-Only Alignment
Division A	Division B
Arrowhead	Brown Deer
Brookfield Central	Cedarburg
Brookfield East	Germantown
Hamilton	Grafton
Kenosha Bradford	Homestead
Menomonee Falls East	Nicolet
Menomonee Falls North	Port Washington

For the 1982 football season, Kenosha Bradford and Germantown swapped divisions, and Divisions A and B were renamed the West and East Divisions, respectively. In 1983, Kenosha Bradford left the Braveland Conference to join the Milwaukee Area Conference, and the next year, the two Menomonee Falls high schools merged to form a new Menomonee Falls High School on East's campus. The new school inherited their predecessors' membership in the Braveland Conference.

=== 1985–1993 ===
Location of Braveland Conference Members (1985-1993)

In 1985, another round of conference realignment had occurred in southeastern Wisconsin, and seven schools left the Braveland Conference. Brown Deer joined the Parkland Conference, and six schools (Cedarburg, Germantown, Grafton, Homestead, Nicolet and Port Washington) left to form the North Shore Conference (along with former Suburban Conference members Shorewood, Wauwatosa East, Wauwatosa West and Whitefish Bay). Replacing the seven schools exiting the conference were Mukwonago from the Parkland Conference and Waukesha North and Waukesha South from the Suburban Conference. For the final eight years of the conference's existence, all of its member schools were located in Waukesha County.

=== Epilogue ===
The Braveland Conference was realigned out of existence by the WIAA after the 1992-93 school year. Its four largest members (Arrowhead, Mukwonago, Waukesha North and Waukesha South) joined the new fifteen-member Southeast Conference. The four smaller schools were dispersed to three different conferences: Brookfield Central and Brookfield East went to the new Woodland Conference, and Menomonee Falls and Sussex Hamilton went to the North Shore and Parkland Conferences, respectively. Waukesha West High School was slated to become a member of the Braveland when they opened in 1993, but the conference had been disbanded by that time and they joined the Southeast Conference.

== Conference membership history ==
=== Final members ===
School	Location	Affiliation	Mascot	Colors	Joined	Left	Conference Joined	Current Conference
Arrowhead	Hartland, WI	Public	Warhawks		1980	1993	Southeast	Classic 8
Brookfield Central (Note: Known as Brookfield High School from 1956-1961.)	Brookfield, WI	Public	Lancers		1956	1993	Woodland	Greater Metro
Brookfield East	Brookfield, WI	Public	Spartans		1961	1993	Woodland	Greater Metro
Hamilton	Sussex, WI	Public	Chargers		1962	1993	Parkland	Greater Metro
Menomonee Falls	Menomonee Falls, WI	Public	Indians		1984	1993	North Shore	Greater Metro
Mukwonago	Mukwonago, WI	Public	Indians		1985	1993	Southeast	Classic 8
Waukesha North	Waukesha, WI	Public	Northstars		1985	1993	Southeast	Woodland
Waukesha South	Waukesha, WI	Public	Blackshirts		1985	1993	Southeast	Woodland

=== Previous members ===
School	Location	Affiliation	Mascot	Colors	Joined	Left	Conference Joined	Current Conference
Brown Deer (Note: Known as Granville Union High School from 1958-1966.)	Brown Deer, WI	Public	Falcons		1958	1985	Parkland	Woodland
Cedarburg	Cedarburg, WI	Public	Bulldogs		1953	1985	North Shore	
Germantown	Germantown, WI	Public	Warhawks		1980	1985	North Shore	Greater Metro
Grafton	Grafton, WI	Public	Black Hawks		1980	1985	North Shore	
Greendale	Greendale, WI	Public	Panthers		1961	1963	Parkland	Woodland
Greenfield	Greenfield, WI	Public	Hustlin' Hawks		1961	1963	Parkland	Woodland
Homestead	Mequon, WI	Public	Highlanders		1961	1985	North Shore	
Kenosha Bradford	Kenosha, WI	Public	Red Devils		1980	1983	Milwaukee Area	Southeast
Menomonee Falls East	Menomonee Falls, WI	Public	Titans		1969	1984	Closed (merged into Menomonee Falls)	
Menomonee Falls North (Note: Known as Menomonee Falls High School prior to 1969.)	Menomonee Falls, WI	Public	Indians		1953	1984	Closed (merged into Menomonee Falls)	
Muskego	Muskego, WI	Public	Warriors		1958	1963	Parkland	Classic Eight
New Berlin (Note: Currently known as New Berlin West High School.)	New Berlin, WI	Public	Vikings		1961	1963	Parkland	Woodland
Nicolet	Glendale, WI	Public	Knights		1956	1985	North Shore	
Oak Creek	Oak Creek, WI	Public	Knights		1959	1963	Parkland	Classic 8
Port Washington	Port Washington, WI	Public	Pirates		1953	1985	North Shore	Glacier Trails
Salem Central (Note: Currently known as Westosha Central High School.)	Paddock Lake, WI	Public	Falcons		1955	1958	Southeastern Wisconsin	Southern Lakes
Watertown	Watertown, WI	Public	Goslings		1953	1959	Little Ten	Badger
Whitnall	Greenfield, WI	Public	Falcons		1961	1963	Parkland	Woodland

== Membership timeline ==
Junior Varsity only Northern Braveland Southern Braveland

== List of state champions ==
=== Fall sports ===
Boys Cross Country
School	Year	Division
Port Washington	1956	Small Schools
Port Washington	1957	Small Schools
Port Washington	1960	Small Schools
Brookfield Central	1964	Medium Schools
Homestead	1967	Medium Schools
Menomonee Falls North	1971	Medium Schools
Menomonee Falls North	1976	Class A
Menomonee Falls North	1982	Class A
Brookfield Central	1986	Class A

Girls Cross Country
School	Year	Division
Waukesha North	1992	Division 1

Football
School	Year	Division
Menomonee Falls East	1976	Division 2
Grafton	1981	Division 2
Grafton	1982	Division 2

Girls Golf
School	Year	Division
Nicolet	1984	Single Division

Girls Swimming & Diving
School	Year	Division
Homestead	1984	Single Division
Arrowhead	1987	Single Division

Girls Tennis
School	Year	Division
Nicolet	1975	Single Division
Nicolet	1976	Single Division
Nicolet	1977	Single Division
Nicolet	1978	Single Division
Nicolet	1980	Single Division
Nicolet	1981	Single Division
Nicolet	1982	Single Division
Brookfield Central	1983	Single Division
Brookfield Central	1984	Single Division
Brookfield Central	1985	Single Division
Brookfield Central	1986	Single Division
Brookfield Central	1987	Single Division
Brookfield Central	1991	Single Division

=== Winter sports ===
Girls Basketball
School	Year	Division
Brookfield Central	1985	Class A
Arrowhead	1988	Class A
Arrowhead	1991	Class A

Gymnastics
School	Year	Division
Homestead	1975	Single Division
Brookfield Central	1976	Single Division
Brookfield Central	1977	Single Division
Brookfield East	1978	Class A
Brookfield East	1979	Class A
Nicolet	1980	Class A
Nicolet	1981	Class A
Nicolet	1982	Class A
Brookfield Central	1988	Class A
Brookfield Central	1991	Class A

Boys Swimming & Diving
School	Year	Division
Greenfield	1963	Single Division

Boys Wrestling
School	Year	Division
Port Washington	1971	Single Division
Port Washington	1984	Class A

=== Spring sports ===
Baseball
School	Year	Division
Watertown	1955	Single Division

Boys Golf
School	Year	Division
Brookfield Central	1978	Single Division
Nicolet	1980	Single Division
Waukesha South	1989	Single Division

Softball
School	Year	Division
Menomonee Falls East	1979	Class A
Arrowhead	1982	Class A

Boys Tennis
School	Year	Division
Nicolet	1959	Single Division
Nicolet	1967	Single Division
Nicolet	1968	Single Division
Nicolet	1969	Single Division
Nicolet	1970	Single Division
Nicolet	1971	Single Division
Nicolet	1972	Single Division
Nicolet	1973	Single Division
Nicolet	1974	Single Division
Nicolet	1976	Single Division
Nicolet	1977	Single Division
Nicolet	1978	Single Division
Brookfield East	1979	Single Division
Brookfield East	1980	Single Division
Brookfield East	1981	Single Division
Nicolet	1982	Single Division
Nicolet	1983	Single Division
Nicolet	1984	Single Division
Brookfield Central	1985	Single Division

Boys Track & Field
School	Year	Division
Port Washington	1954	Class B
Homestead	1963	Class B
Homestead	1964	Class B
Sussex Hamilton	1978	Class A
Brookfield Central	1983	Class A
Waukesha North	1993	Class A

Girls Track & Field
School	Year	Division
Homestead	1983	Class A

=== Summer sports ===
Baseball (Note: Baseball was sponsored by the WIAA as a spring and summer sport from 1965-2018. The Braveland Conference competed in baseball as a summer sport during this time period.)
School	Year	Division
Granville	1966	Single Division
Brookfield Central	1969	Single Division
Homestead	1974	Single Division
Brown Deer	1975	Single Division
Brookfield Central	1976	Single Division
Brown Deer	1977	Single Division
Homestead	1978	Single Division
Sussex Hamilton	1981	Single Division
Nicolet	1985	Single Division

== List of conference champions ==
=== Boys Basketball ===
School	Quantity	Years
(Brookfield) Central	9	1958, 1961, 1962, 1965, 1966, 1970, 1983, 1984, 1986
(Menomonee Falls) North	7	1958, 1959, 1960, 1962, 1963, 1969, 1980
Waukesha South	5	1988, 1989, 1990, 1991, 1992
Brookfield East	4	1968, 1977, 1985, 1987
Cedarburg	3	1955, 1956, 1967
Hamilton	3	1975, 1976, 1979
Homestead	3	1963, 1964, 1978
Nicolet	3	1971, 1972, 1973
Port Washington	3	1954, 1960, 1974
Watertown	3	1955, 1956, 1957
Menomonee Falls	2	1988, 1993
(Granville) Brown Deer	1	1982
Greenfield	1	1963
Menomonee Falls East	1	1981
Waukesha North	1	1986
Arrowhead	0	
Germantown	0	
Grafton	0	
Greendale	0	
Kenosha Bradford	0	
Mukwonago	0	
Muskego	0	
New Berlin	0	
Oak Creek	0	
Salem Central	0	
Whitnall	0	

=== Girls Basketball ===
School	Quantity	Years
Brookfield East	9	1975, 1976, 1977, 1978, 1980, 1981, 1984, 1985, 1987
Arrowhead	7	1983, 1984, 1986, 1988, 1989, 1990, 1991
Menomonee Falls East	2	1981, 1982
Waukesha South	2	1990, 1993
Nicolet	1	1979
Waukesha North	1	1992
Brookfield Central	0	
Brown Deer	0	
Cedarburg	0	
Germantown	0	
Grafton	0	
Hamilton	0	
Homestead	0	
Kenosha Bradford	0	
Menomonee Falls	0	
Menomonee Falls North	0	
Mukwonago	0	
Port Washington	0	

=== Football ===
School	Quantity	Years
Port Washington	10	1957, 1958, 1959, 1961, 1964, 1971, 1972, 1978, 1979, 1983
(Brookfield) Central	9	1958, 1960, 1961, 1964, 1968, 1969, 1970, 1972, 1974
Menomonee Falls East	5	1972, 1973, 1976, 1977, 1982
Grafton	4	1980, 1981, 1982, 1984
(Granville) Brown Deer	4	1962, 1965, 1967, 1975
Menomonee Falls	3	1985, 1986, 1991
Waukesha South	3	1988, 1989, 1990
Arrowhead	2	1991, 1992
(Menomonee Falls) North	2	1981, 1982
Watertown	2	1954, 1956
Greenfield	1	1962
Hamilton	1	1980
Homestead	1	1963
Mukwonago	1	1987
Muskego	1	1958
Nicolet	1	1966
Salem Central	1	1955
Brookfield East	0	
Cedarburg	0	
Germantown	0	
Greendale	0	
Kenosha Bradford	0	
New Berlin	0	
Oak Creek	0	
Waukesha North	0	
Whitnall	0	

=== Wrestling ===
School	Quantity	Years
(Brookfield) Central	7	1959, 1960, 1968, 1972, 1973, 1977, 1978
Port Washington	6	1963, 1969, 1970, 1971, 1983, 1984
Waukesha South	5	1988, 1990, 1991, 1992, 1993
(Granville) Brown Deer	4	1961, 1962, 1964, 1965
Cedarburg	4	1974, 1975, 1976, 1979
Hamilton	3	1980, 1983, 1986
Brookfield East	2	1966, 1967
Menomonee Falls East	2	1981, 1982
Arrowhead	1	1985
Menomonee Falls	1	1987
Mukwonago	1	1989
Muskego	1	1963
Nicolet	1	1965
Waukesha North	1	1987
Germantown	0	
Grafton	0	
Greendale	0	
Greenfield	0	
Homestead	0	
Kenosha Bradford	0	
(Menomonee Falls) North	0	
New Berlin	0	
Oak Creek	0	
Watertown	0	
Whitnall	0	
