= Michael J. Schwerin =

Michael J. Schwerin is a Rear Admiral in the United States Navy.

== Biography ==
Michael J. Schwerin is a native of Waukesha, Wisconsin. He graduated from Watertown High School in Watertown, Wisconsin and from Carroll University, Southern Illinois University Carbondale and the Air Command and Staff College.

Schwerin joined the Navy in 1994, served as an active-duty Navy Medical Service Corps Research Psychologist from 1994 to 1999, and transitioned to the Navy Reserve in 1999. In 2008, he laterally transferred to the Navy Human Resources community and served in a variety of leadership roles until his retirement on October 1, 2024. Key assignments included commanding officer tours with the Expeditionary Combat Readiness Center Sailor mobilization teams and Director of Manpower & Personnel with the Combined Joint Task Force - Horn of Africa from 2018 to 2019.

In 2021, Schwerin was named as Deputy Commander, Navy Personnel Command. Decorations he has received include the Defense Superior Service Medal, the Meritorious Service Medal, the Navy Commendation Medal and the Navy Achievement Medal.
