= Ken Kranz =

American football player (1923–2017)

Kenneth Andrew Kranz
No. 42
- Position: Defensive back

Personal information
- Born: September 12, 1923; Milwaukee, Wisconsin, U.S.
- Died: April 8, 2017 (aged 93); Menomonee Falls, Wisconsin, U.S.
- Listed height: 5 ft 10 in (1.78 m)
- Listed weight: 190 lb (86 kg)

Career information
- High school: Custer (Milwaukee)
- College: UW–Milwaukee
- NFL draft: 1949: 21st round, 203rd overall pick

Career history
- Green Bay Packers (1949)

Career NFL statistics
- Games played: 7
- Fumble recoveries: 1
- Stats at Pro Football Reference

Kenneth Andrew Kranz (September 12, 1923 – April 8, 2017) was an American National Football League (NFL) football player.

== Early life ==
Born in Milwaukee, Wisconsin, Kranz graduated from Custer High School. He played soccer in his freshman year; then football as a center before being switched to halfback for his junior year. He was all-city during his senior year.

== College ==
Kranz began playing football for the Milwaukee State Teachers College (currently known as the University of Wisconsin–Milwaukee), but was drafted into military service during World War II. He was with the Air Force's troop carrier command in England as a radio operator on aircraft that carried troops into combat zones in France, Belgium and Germany. He earned five battle stars and several medals during his service.

Returning to college, Kranz played football for four years from 1945 to 1948 at the Milwaukee State Teachers College. Earning four collegiate letters in football, he also earned three letters in track claiming the conference discus title in 1946. At the age of 26, he became the first UWM player to be drafted to a professional football team.

== Professional football ==
The Green Bay Packers selected Kranz in the 21st round of the 1949 NFL draft. Kranz played defensive back for the Packers in six or seven games of the 1949 season from April 10, 1949, until the end of the season. At that time he decided on leaving the team to return to school after discussing it with his wife, Shirley. He earned $3,500 for the season.

== Teaching and later life ==
Kranz taught for 32 years at Browning Elementary School of Milwaukee Public Schools, then retired in 1984. He was inducted into the Milwaukee Athletics Hall of Fame in 1975. Kranz died in April 2017 at the age of 93.
