= Little Five Conference (Wisconsin) =

Wisconsin high school athletic conference (1929-1935)

The Little Five Conference is a former high school athletic conference with its membership concentrated in southeastern Wisconsin. It was operational from 1929 to 1935 and all conference members belonged to the Wisconsin Interscholastic Athletic Association.

== History ==
Location of Original Little Five Conference Members

Originally known as the Little Four Conference, the Little Five was formed in 1929 by four small high schools in Dodge County and Jefferson County in southeastern Wisconsin: Hustisford, Johnson Creek, Juneau and Reeseville. Fox Lake joined the conference in 1930 to give the conference its fifth member, making necessary the name change to the Little Five Conference. Juneau left the conference in 1932 to compete as an independent and were replaced by Hartland after their exit from the Little Seven Conference a few years earlier. In 1934, Fox Lake left the conference to become members of the Columbia County Little Seven Conference, which a few years later would change its name to the Dual County Conference. The Little Five continued with four schools for one more season before disbanding in 1935. Hartland and Johnson Creek found new homes right away: Hartland to the 4-C Conference and Johnson Creek to the Madison Suburban Conference. Hustisford and Reeseville continued as independents until finding new affiliations in later years.

== Conference membership history ==
=== Final members ===
School	Location	Affiliation	Mascot	Colors	Joined	Left	Conference Joined	Current Conference
Hartland	Hartland, WI	Public	Trojans		1932	1935	4-C	Closed in 1956 (replaced by Arrowhead)
Hustisford	Hustisford, WI	Public	Falcons		1929	1935	Independent	Trailways
Johnson Creek	Johnson Creek, WI	Public	Bluejays		1929	1935	Madison Suburban	Trailways
Reeseville	Reeseville, WI	Public	Eagles		1929	1935	Independent	Closed in 1942

=== Previous members ===
School	Location	Affiliation	Mascot	Colors	Joined	Left	Conference Joined	Current Conference
Fox Lake	Fox Lake, WI	Public	Lakers		1930	1934	Columbia County Little Seven	Closed in 1962 (consolidated into Waupun)
Juneau	Juneau, WI	Public	Chiefs		1929	1932	Independent	Closed in 1969 (merged into Dodgeland)

== List of conference champions ==
=== Boys Basketball ===
School	Quantity	Years
Johnson Creek	6	1930, 1931, 1932, 1933, 1934, 1935
Fox Lake	0	
Hartland	0	
Hustisford	0	
Juneau	0	
Reeseville	0	
