= Viola S. Wendt =

American poet and educator (1907-1986)

- Born: March 31, 1907; Boise, Idaho
- Died: March 23, 1986 (aged 78); Waukesha, Wisconsin
- Citizenship: U.S.
- Education: University of Wisconsin–Madison (B.A., M.A., & Ph.D.)
- Known for: Publication of original poems
- Scientific career
- Fields: Poet & Educator
- Workplaces: University of Wisconsin–Platteville; University of Wisconsin–Madison; Carroll University

Viola Sophia Wendt (March 31, 1907 – March 23, 1986) was an American poet and educator.

== Early life and education ==
Wendt was born into a farming family in Boise, Idaho, in March 1907, the first of two daughters of Carl Wendt. Her parents moved to West Bend, Wisconsin in 1914 in order for her father to pursue new business opportunities. Viola was educated there, graduating from West Bend High School in 1924. She was a bright student, especially excelling at languages, writing, and literary analysis. Accordingly, Wendt entered the University of Wisconsin–Madison (UW), majoring in English Literature. During her time there as an undergraduate, Viola acquired a particular affinity for poetry and was told by professors that her compositions revealed a "talent for the bizarre."

== Graduate education and teaching career ==
She secured a position as a graduate student in English at Radcliffe College (now part of Harvard University) in Cambridge, Massachusetts, after receiving her B.A. degree from the University of Wisconsin in 1928. Eighteen months later, when the U.S. stock market crashed, ushering in the Great Depression, Wendt and her family were no longer able to afford tuition at Radcliffe, and she was forced to suspend her studies. Viola returned to Wisconsin and set about obtaining a general teaching certificate so she could earn a living. In the meantime, she was employed as a live-in nanny for several families in Madison. Wendt completed work on an M.A. degree in English at UW in 1936. With a teaching certificate in hand, she was employed there as a graduate assistant in English, and then taught that subject at the Platteville State Teachers College (now University of Wisconsin–Platteville).

Entry of the U.S. into World War II in December 1941 had a definite impact on faculty numbers at many colleges in Wisconsin. One of them was Carroll College (now Carroll University) in Waukesha, which, having lost 3 English professors to military service, offered Ms. Wendt a position in that department in 1942. She entered as an assistant professor and remained at that institution for the rest of her career, achieving full Professor status in the early 1960s. Wendt was recognized by her students as a demanding and accomplished instructor. At the same time, she was an understanding individual with a wry sense of humor and a good perspective on the ironies and spiritual aspects of life. While teaching at Carroll, Wendt continued work on a Ph.D. at UW, which was completed in 1947. Her doctoral dissertation was a psychologically-oriented analysis of the works of Archibald MacLeish.

== Publications ==
Wendt continued to write poetry throughout her career, and several poems were published as individual works. One of them, "On Reading Marianne Moore," was given one of the 1955 Borestone Mountain Poetry Awards. Later in her life she published several anthologies of her poems, entitled "You Keep Waiting for Geese" (1975); "The Wind is Rising" (1979); and "In Any Available Light" (1983). These received critical acclaim, exemplified in this review by Dr. Herman Salinger of Duke University in 1975:

"The wit and sometimes acid irony of these poems-- on love, death, and age, and the many faces of God-- are tempered with the wisdom of maturity. Only a lifetime of living intimately and critically with words and, like Wordsworth, seeing 'into the life of things,' could produce such poems as 'Love is Loose in the Streets' or the Franciscan note of the series on 'The Creatures with Whom We Share the Earth.' Here is a highly original temperament, disciplined by a subtle, almost shy, classicism-- yet boldly modern in feeling".

== Retirement and death ==
Wendt, who never married, retired from active teaching in 1975 and thereafter served as "poet-in-residence" at Carroll College. She died in March 1986 in Waukesha and is buried in West Bend, Wisconsin. A scholarship in Wendt's name has been created in the English department at Carroll.
