= Blaine Mueller =

American basketball coach

Charlotte Hornets
- Position: Assistant coach
- League: NBA

Personal information
- Born: Watertown, Wisconsin, U.S.

Career information
- High school: Watertown (Watertown, Wisconsin)
- College: Wisconsin–Stevens Point (2010–2011)
- Coaching career: 2013–present

Career history

Coaching
- 2013–2016: Middleton HS (assistant)
- 2016–2018: Lindenwood (assistant)
- 2018–2022: Milwaukee Bucks (player development assistant)
- 2022–2023: Milwaukee Bucks (assistant)
- 2023–2024: Maine Celtics
- 2024–present: Charlotte Hornets (assistant)

Blaine Mueller is an American professional basketball coach who is an assistant coach for the Charlotte Hornets of the National Basketball Association (NBA).

== Coaching career ==
Mueller began his coaching career in college basketball as an assistant coach for the Lindenwood Lions from 2016 to 2018.

Mueller earned his first coaching position in the NBA as a video and player development assistant for the Milwaukee Bucks from 2018 to 2022. He won an NBA championship with the Bucks in 2021 after the Bucks won the 2021 NBA Finals. In 2022, Mueller was promoted to assistant coach with the Bucks under head coach Mike Budenholzer.

In 2023, Mueller was named as the head coach of the Maine Celtics, the NBA G League affiliate of the Boston Celtics. Mueller led the Maine Celtics to the 2024 NBA G-League Finals, losing the championship in three games to the Oklahoma City Blue.

In 2024, Mueller was named as an assistant coach for the Charlotte Hornets under new head coach Charles Lee.

== Personal life ==
Mueller is a graduate of the University of Wisconsin-Madison, where he earned a chemistry degree. He did not play basketball there. He did play for the University of Wisconsin–Stevens Point in 2010–11.
