= Port Washington High School =

Port Washington High School may refer to:

- Port Washington High School in Port Washington, Wisconsin
- Paul D. Schreiber Senior High School in Port Washington, New York, sometimes referred to as Port Washington High School
