= Custer High School (Milwaukee) =

High school in Milwaukee, Wisconsin, US

Coordinates: 43°06′35.1″N 87°58′03.4″W

- Milwaukee, Wisconsin; United States

Information
- Type: High school

Custer High School was a public high school located at 5075 North Sherman Boulevard in Milwaukee, Wisconsin. The name of Custer High School dates to the early 1930s when it was located at what is the now closed Thomas A. Edison Middle School. The original school, located at N. 37th and W. Custer Avenue was named Custer High School after the city of Milwaukee annexed neighboring North Milwaukee in 1929. By the 1950s, the post-WWII baby boomer generation reached high school age, and the need for another school became clear. School officials agreed to the construction of a new Custer High School building on North Sherman Boulevard in 1955, and the old school was renamed Edison Junior High School. The new school's principal was Raymond F. Michalak, former principal at Milwaukee North Division High School. Michalak was interested in kids with exceptional academic abilities, and began a new program for academically gifted kids at Custer High School, even writing a paper about it titled “A Program for High-School Youth of Superior Ability.” By 1960, Custer High School had 2,200 students enrolled in grades 10–12. Michalak served as Principal until 1969 when he retired.

== Nickname and mascot ==
Custer High School Mascot 1960's & '70's

Though the school was named after American Civil War General George Armstrong Custer, neither he nor his men were honored with images or mascots. When the new school opened on Sherman Boulevard, the annual yearbook was called the Custer Warrior, the student body and athletic teams were referred to as the Custer Indians, and football players were known as the Custer Hatchetmen.

School colors were red and white, and the mascot was fashioned after Hiawatha, a leader from the Mohawk tribe, Images and a story line in the 1958 and 1959 Custer Warrior yearbook depict Hiawatha learning and honing his knowledge and skills to become a leader. The school mascot was a side profile head of an American Indian chief in full feathered headdress.

=== Athletic conference affiliation history ===
- Little Five Conference (1926–1927)
- Little Seven Conference (1927–1930)
- Milwaukee City Conference (1930–1980)
- Milwaukee Area Conference (1980–1985)
- Milwaukee City Conference (1985–present)

== Mascot changed ==
In the early 1970s, the American Indian Movement (AIM) began a nation-wide campaign opposing the use of indigenous people as mascots by sports teams. In 1972, at the request of the American Indian Movement, the Appointment and Instruction Committee of the Milwaukee School Board adopted a statement that Custer High School was not named after General George A. Custer, but instead, after a man named Harvey Custer, a constable from the old town of Granville in the 1800s. The movement was successful in removing Native American mascots and nicknames from many Wisconsin schools including Custer High School in 1992, when the name and mascot were changed to the Custer Cougars.

== Custer controversy ==
In 1972, Milwaukee superintendent of schools, Richard P Gousha, said there was "no conclusive evidence the school was named after Gen. George Custer," but rather, after Custer Ave. where the original Custer High School was located. Gousha said that Custer Ave. was named after Harvey Custer, a constable from the old town of Granville in the 1800s. The school board committee then concluded that the school was named after the street, and the street was named after Harvey Custer, not Gen. George Custer. American Indian Movement (AIM) leader, Herbert Powless said AIM "had no problem as long as Custer High School was not named after the famed Indian fighter."

Further investigation shows that "Harvey Custer," the constable being referred to, never existed. He was the fabricated result of a transcription error. The man's name was actually "Harvey Carter," but The Illustrated Historical Atlas of Milwaukee County, Wisconsin, published in 1876, misspelled Harvey Carter's name as "Custer" when listing the men elected as the first officials of the Town of Granville. Granville Town Board minutes and census records from 1840 list the Constable as Harvey Carter. Carter is also listed in the 1842 and 1846 Granville census records. There are no records of a Harvey Custer ever living there.

As for Custer Avenue, the Milwaukee County Register of Deeds records show Custer Avenue was initially named in “Payne’s Park Addition,” a subdivision planned in 1892 by Henry Clay Payne. As was a custom of the period, Payne's development pattern included new streets named after Civil War Generals Philip Sheridan, Lewis Wallace, and George A. Custer. Wallace Avenue was eventually renamed but Sheridan and Custer avenues still exist. Custer Avenue was in fact, named after American Civil War General George Armstrong Custer.

== School renamed ==
In 2011, the school was renamed the Milwaukee Campus for Trades, Technology and Media, with a focus on vocational and technology programs. Subsequently, the Milwaukee Public School Board decided to add the Barack Obama K-8 School to the same campus due to available space as part of its school consolidation program. The entire school complex was later renamed Barack Obama School of Career and Technical Education in a controversial vote (5/4) by the board. Today, the school website tells visitors the school "fosters an educational environment that aligns curriculum and instruction to specific learning goals and the common core standards."

== Notable alumni ==
- Ralph Votapek, internationally acclaimed pianist
- Jim Launder, Wisconsin soccer coach UW-Milwaukee, Wisconsin Soccer Coaches Association Hall of Fame
- Ken Kranz, American NFL football player with the Green Bay Packers
- Jimmy Banks, one of the first two Black soccer players on the US Men's National Team, coached soccer at MSOE, played for the Milwaukee Wave, an MISL team.
- Michael L. Jahncke, professor emeritus of Food Science and Technology at Virginia Tech University. Graduated From Cornell in 1985 with a PhD in Food Science and a Minor in Microbiology; Agricultural Marketing
- Arlyn D. Ackley Sr., Former Native American Tribal Chairman of the Mole Lake Wisconsin Sokaogon Chippewa Community
- Bruce Froemming, Major League Baseball umpire
