= Watertown Unified School District =

School district in Wisconsin, United States

Address
- 111 Dodge Street Watertown, Wisconsin, 53094-4434; United States
- Coordinates: 43.192047°N 88.724491°W

District information
- Superintendent: Jarred Burke
- NCES District ID: 5515750

Students and staff
- Students: 3,577 (2019-2020)
- Student–teacher ratio: 15.72
- District mascot: Goslings
- Colors: Blue and White

Other information
- Website: www.watertown.k12.wi.us

Watertown Unified School District is a school district in Watertown, Wisconsin, about halfway between Madison and Milwaukee. The school district has about 3,200 students. The Superintendent of Schools, Jarred Burke, has been on a leave of absence since January 2026. Director of Special Education and Student Services Sarah Oudenhoven and Director of Innovation and Technology Jason Bull currently serve as co-interim superintendents during Jared Burke's absence.

== History ==
In November 2024, the Watertown Unified School District approved a "Gender Support Plan". Forbes and Wisconsin Public Radio reported Watertown's plan for transgender students as "one of the most restrictive" LGBTQ+ policies in the state. The policy requires parents and guardians to be alerted and provide consent before students can identify with new pronouns or a new name that is different from their birth certificate. According to the plan, school staff "may" use the new pronouns and names but "shall not be compelled" to use them. Transgender students will use restrooms and locker rooms consistent with their biological sex. They may also participate in intramural sports and extracurricular activities that are consistent with their biological sex. At the time, the district reported approximately 25 transgender students enrolled within the district.

In the five months after 2024 elections, five members of the Watertown School Board resigned. Board members who resigned cited "continued disrespect from local board members" and "an 'authoritarian' style of leadership" as reasons for leaving. Superintendent Jarred Burke explained the turnover was due to "inexperienced board members" who were "not 'gelling'" with other members.

In May 2026, the Watertown School Board voted 7-1, prohibiting the Watertown High School band from performing A Mother of A Revolution!, a 2019 wind ensemble piece by Omar Thomas dedicated to LGBTQ activist Marsha P. Johnson. In response, students at Watertown High School and Riverside Middle School staged a walk-out. On May 20th, students performed the piece at a special event at a local Lutheran Church to a crowded audience with Omar Thomas as their conductor. This event was unaffiliated with the school district.

== Schools ==
The district operates the following schools:

- Watertown 4 Kids
- Douglas Elementary School
- Lebanon Elementary School
- Lincoln Elementary School
- Schurz Elementary School
- Webster Elementary School
- Riverside Middle School
- Watertown High School
- Summer School
