= Ryan Rohlinger =

American baseball player (born 1983)

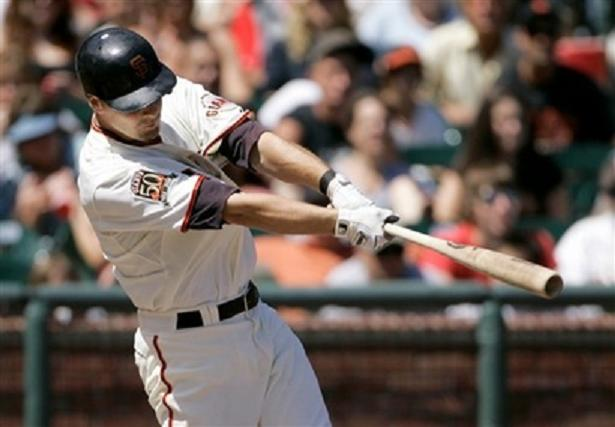
- Rohlinger with the San Francisco Giants
- Third baseman
- Born: October 7, 1983 (age 42); West Bend, Wisconsin, U.S.
- Batted: Right Threw: Right

MLB debut
- August 13, 2008, for the San Francisco Giants

Last appearance
- May 3, 2011, for the San Francisco Giants

MLB statistics
- Batting average: .134
- Home runs: 0
- Runs batted in: 7
- Stats at Baseball Reference

Teams
- San Francisco Giants (2008–2011)

Ryan Lee Rohlinger (/ˈroʊlɪŋər/; born October 7, 1983) is an American former professional baseball infielder. He played in Major League Baseball for the San Francisco Giants from 2008 through 2011.

== Amateur career ==
=== High school ===
Rohlinger graduated from West Bend East High School in West Bend, Wisconsin in 2002, where he played baseball, football, basketball, and tennis. Rohlinger was an all-state pick in all four sports he participated in his senior season, an accomplishment that had never occurred in Wisconsin Prep History. He was also named the 2001–2002 State Scholar Athlete of the year by the WIAA.

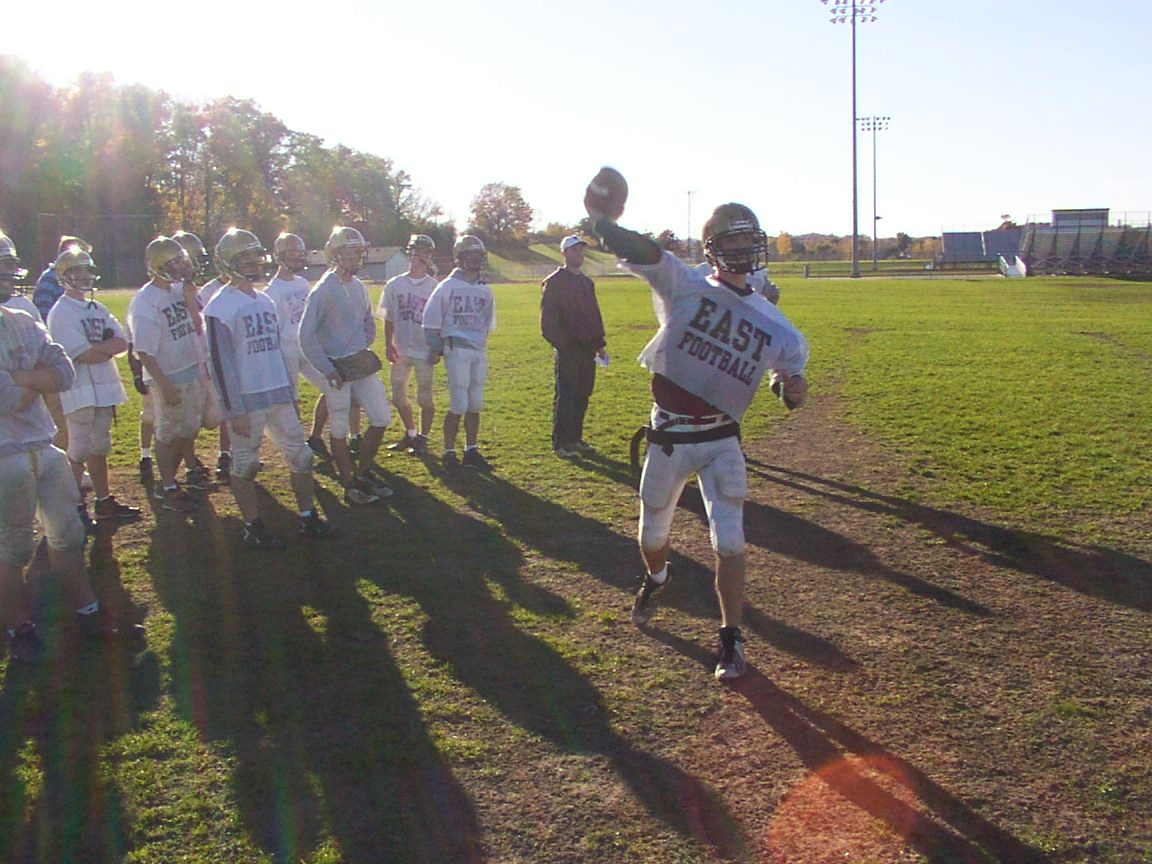
Ryan throws to HS Receivers.

Rohlinger was an accomplished football player in high school earning all-state honors as a wide receiver as a sophomore and as a quarterback as a junior and senior. Named back of the year his junior and senior seasons, Rohlinger holds over 40 school football records. Rohlinger has the 3rd highest receiving yardage game in Wisconsin prep history, 11 catches for 292 yards and 3 touchdowns in 1999. Rohlinger also holds the 3rd highest yardage game as a quarterback, 28 of 50 for 474 yards and 2 touchdowns in 2001.

As a basketball player, Rohlinger was an all-state point guard, both as a junior and senior.

In Rohlinger's two years playing tennis, he made the state tournament and was named all-state despite not playing tennis prior to that season.

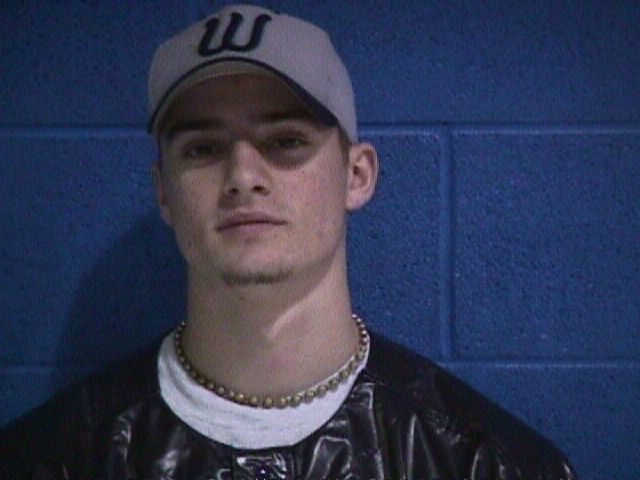
Ryan with Wisconsin Blazers.

Rohlinger was a 4-year starter at the then powerhouse West Bend East team that was coached by state coaching legend, Doug Gonring. As a baseball player, Rohlinger was named the Wisconsin state player of the year in 2002. He was an all-state second baseman as a freshman and sophomore and an all-state selection at shortstop as a junior and senior. Rohlinger was a part of two state championships at West Bend East, 1999 and 2002 with the team compiling a 110–21 record during his prep career. Rohlinger holds state records in doubles and total bases.

Rohlinger was also a member of the Midwest Blazers, a scout team located in Milwaukee, Wisconsin. During Rohlinger's time with the Blazers, he was named the tournament Most Valuable Player three times and hit over .400 in two years as the Blazers Shortstop.

On December 23, 2008, Rohlinger's baseball number 17 was retired in a halftime ceremony at a West Bend East vs. West Bend West Basketball game. His old jersey and number are hanging in the West Bend Gymnasium and baseball fields.

=== College ===
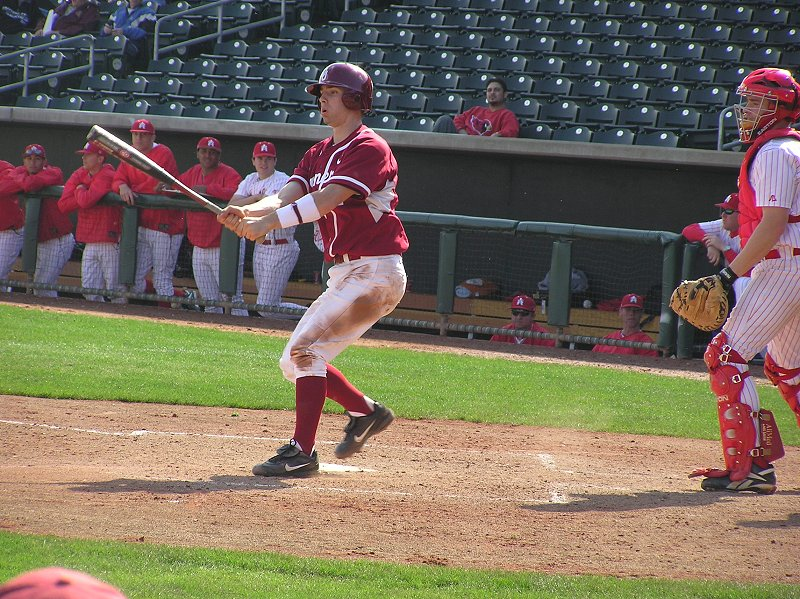
Ryan in a game for Oklahoma.

Rohlinger attended Clarendon Junior College in Texas in 2002–2003 becoming a Junior College All American. As a result, Rohlinger transferred to the University of Oklahoma in Norman, Oklahoma. Rohlinger was the starting third baseman for the Sooners and got a reputation right away at Oklahoma for being Mr. Clutch, as he had several game winning home runs and hits, including a game-winning home run against then number 1 University of Texas. Rohlinger was a team captain in 2006 for the University of Oklahoma. In the summer of 2004, Rohlinger was named the Most Valuable Player in the Cape Cod Baseball League Championship series, as he helped the Yarmouth-Dennis Red Sox to the league crown.

== Professional career ==
=== San Francisco Giants ===
Rohlinger was selected in the 2005 Major League Baseball draft in the 21st round by the St. Louis Cardinals, but returned to University of Oklahoma for his senior season. Rohlinger was then selected in the 6th round of the 2006 Major League Baseball draft by the San Francisco Giants.

Rohlinger played for the Salem-Keizer Volcanoes of the Northwest League in 2006 that won the Northwest League Championship. Rohlinger batted .252 with 3 home runs and 28 runs batted in.

Rohlinger played for the Augusta GreenJackets of the South Atlantic League in 2007. Rohlinger led the team in home runs with 18. He also batted .235 with 78 runs batted in.

In 2008, Rohlinger was added to the San Francisco Giants spring training roster and competed for the 2008 third baseman position. After making it to the final day of spring training, Rohlinger was sent to the High-A San Jose Giants in San Jose, California. During the first 3 months Rohlinger posted a .285 average with 7 home runs and 46 runs batted in. Rohlinger was promoted June 21, 2008, to the Double-A Connecticut Defenders in Norwich, Connecticut. Rohlinger hit .296 with 6 home runs and 19 runs batted in.

He was called up the San Francisco Giants on August 13, 2008. Rohlinger, along with Pablo Sandoval, started the season in Single-A and ultimately ended up on the major league roster, something that does not happen frequently.

Rohlinger started the 2009 season in Triple A Fresno where he batted .281 with 16 home runs and 78 runs batted in. On August 25, 2009, Rohlinger was recalled to the San Francisco Giants and remained with the Giants for the remainder of the season.

He started the 2010 season in Triple A Fresno, but on May 7, 2010, he was recalled to the San Francisco Giants which started a season where he would go back and forth several times. Rohlinger batted .311 with 8 home runs and 48 runs batted in for Fresno. He remained with the Giants through their World Series run which ended in a championship.

Rohlinger will start the 2011 season in Triple A Fresno. Rohlinger was called up to the San Francisco Giants and appeared in one game. The Giants designated him for assignment on May 26.

=== Colorado Rockies ===
He was claimed off waivers by the Colorado Rockies on June 2. On November 20, he was released by Colorado.

=== Cleveland Indians ===
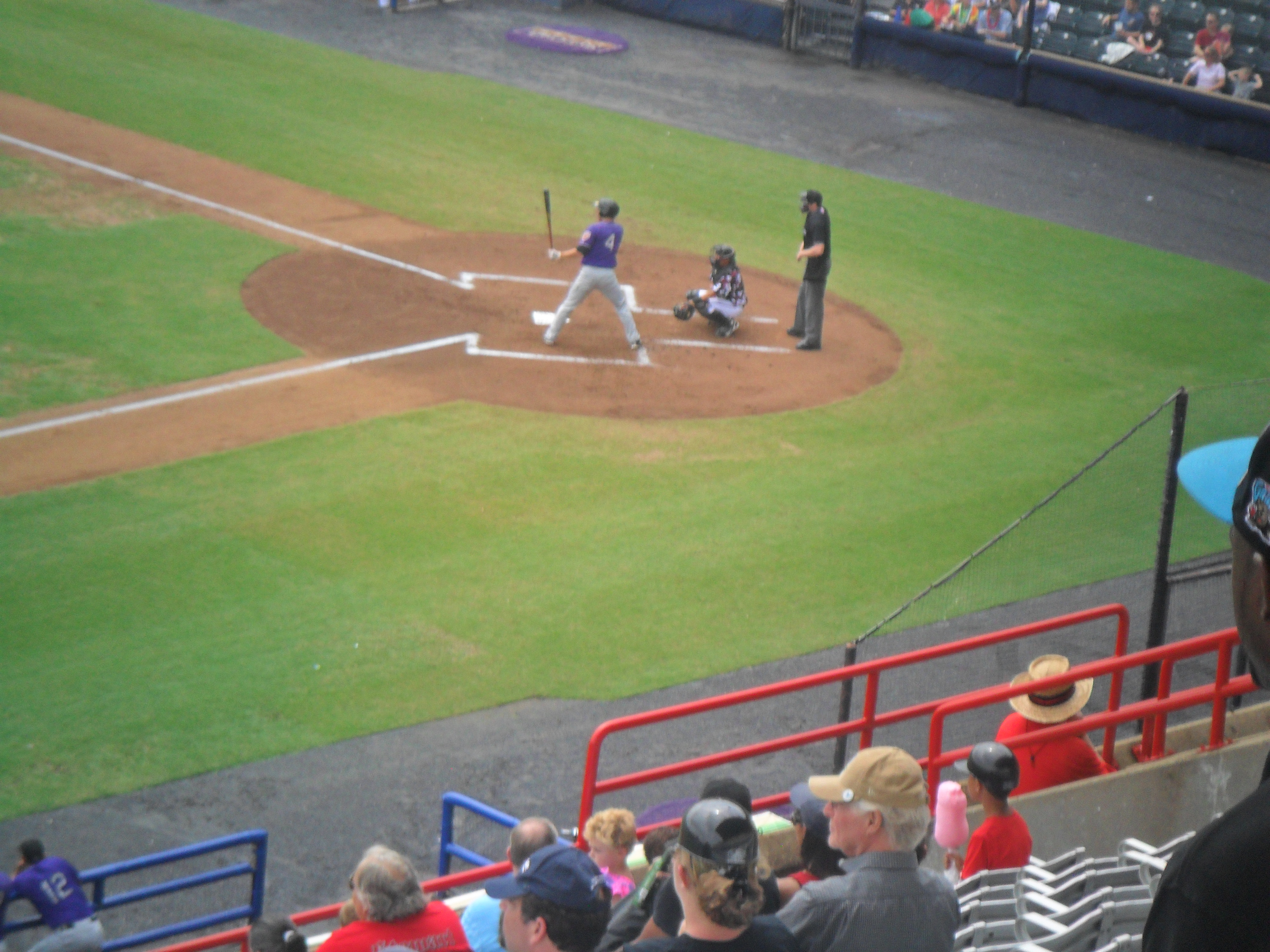
Rohlinger with the Akron Aeros, September 1, 2012

Rohlinger was signed by the Cleveland Indians to a minor league contract for the 2012 season and spent the 2012 season at Double A Akron and Triple A Columbus.

Rohlinger was re-signed by the Cleveland Indians to a minor league contract for the 2013 season and started the 2013 season at Triple A Columbus.

In November 2013, Rohlinger was re-signed by the Cleveland Indians to a minor league contract with an invite to Major League camp for the 2014 season.

== Personal ==
Rohlinger comes from an athletic family. Rohlinger has two older brothers, Matt and Adam, and a younger sister Bria. Uncle Willie Mueller was a Major League Baseball pitcher with the Milwaukee Brewers in the late 1970s and early 1980s. Mueller also played the role of the Duke in the movie Major League. Cousin Mike Mueller was a minor league pitcher with the Atlanta Braves organization. Brother Adam Rohlinger was a Division 3 All-American baseball player at Concordia University Wisconsin in Mequon, Wisconsin. Ryan and Adam hold most offensive records at West Bend East High School.

Rohlinger is married to former Northwestern University and West Bend East High School standout volleyball player Christie Gardner and they have a daughter and son.
