= Fred L. Holmes =

American lawyer (1883–1946)

Fred L. Holmes was an American lawyer. He was a member of the Wisconsin State Assembly.

== Biography ==
Fred L. Holmes was born on May 9, 1883, in Winnebago County, Wisconsin He attended Omro High School in Omro, Wisconsin and what is now the University of Wisconsin-Madison. An ally of Robert M. La Follette, he worked for La Follette's Weekly.

Holmes was elected to the Assembly in 1912 as a member of the Republican Party. Outside of politics, he was an attorney and wrote several books.

Holmes died on July 27, 1946. He had been giving a speech in Waukau, Wisconsin when he was struck with a heart attack.
