= Jimmy Banks =

American soccer player (1964–2019)

Personal information
- Full name: Jimmy Banks
- Date of birth: September 2, 1964
- Place of birth: Milwaukee, Wisconsin, U.S.
- Date of death: April 26, 2019 (aged 54)
- Place of death: Milwaukee, Wisconsin, U.S.
- Height: 5 ft 8 in (1.73 m)
- Position: Defender

College career
Years	Team	Apps	(Gls)
1983–1987	Milwaukee Panthers		

Senior career*
Years	Team	Apps	(Gls)
1987–1993	Milwaukee Wave (indoor)	136	(31)

International career
1986–1991	United States	36	(0)

Managerial career
- 1999–2019: Milwaukee School of Engineering
- * Club domestic league appearances and goals

Jimmy Banks (September 2, 1964 – April 26, 2019) was an American soccer defender. After a standout career at the University of Wisconsin–Milwaukee, Banks spent six seasons playing indoor soccer with the Milwaukee Wave. He also earned 35 caps with the national team between 1986 and 1991, including two games at the 1990 FIFA World Cup. After retiring from playing professionally, Banks entered the coaching ranks with both youth clubs and the Milwaukee School of Engineering men's team. Banks died of stomach cancer on April 26, 2019.

== Youth and college ==
Born in Milwaukee, Banks began playing soccer at age six through a Salvation Army program near the city's Westlawn Housing Projects. After graduating from Custer High School in Milwaukee, he attended first the University of Wisconsin–Parkside then the University of Wisconsin–Milwaukee where he earned All-American honors playing NCAA Division I soccer as first a forward, then a midfielder. At Milwaukee, Banks played for his future national team manager Bob Gansler.

== Milwaukee Wave ==
After graduation from Milwaukee, he was drafted by both the Kansas City Comets of the Major Indoor Soccer League and the Milwaukee Wave of the American Indoor Soccer Association. He decided to remain in Milwaukee and signed with the Wave for whom he played from 1987 to 1993. He was a league All Star in 1992.

== National team ==
He earned his first national team cap in a scoreless tie with Canada on February 5, 1986. He went on to play a total of 35 games with the senior team. His national team highlights include starting two games of the 1990 FIFA World Cup against Italy and Austria; and playing as a member of the 1987 Pan American Games and World University Games soccer teams.

Banks and teammate Desmond Armstrong became the first two African-American players named to a U.S. World Cup squad when they made the 22-man roster for the 1990 World Cup.

== Coaching ==
In 1999, he became the head coach of the Milwaukee School of Engineering men's soccer team, a position he held until his death in 2019. He also served as the director of coaching of the Milwaukee Kickers. While he retired from playing professionally, he continued playing with the Milwaukee Bavarians.

In 1988, Banks served as the coach of the junior varsity boys’ soccer team at Brookfield East High School.

He remained a force in Milwaukee's inner city as a founder of an inner-city youth soccer camp and a full-time and volunteer worker with the Milwaukee Boy's and Girl's Club. His years of work with disadvantaged youth led to his being honored with the Community Spirit Award.

In 1999, the University of Wisconsin–Milwaukee inducted Banks into the school's Athletic Hall of Fame.

== Death ==
On April 25, 2019, his son Demetrius "Dee" Banks announced that Banks was in "the final days of his battle with cancer." The following day, Banks died at the age of 54.

== Stadium renaming ==
A soccer and football specific stadium across from Custer High School, was renamed from Custer Stadium to Jimmy Banks Stadium in early 2022. The renaming was introduced to the Committee on Accountability, Finance and Personnel through a campaign organized by Tim Clements and Corey Thompson, among others active in the Milwaukee soccer community.
