= Edwin J. Larson =

American politician and businessman

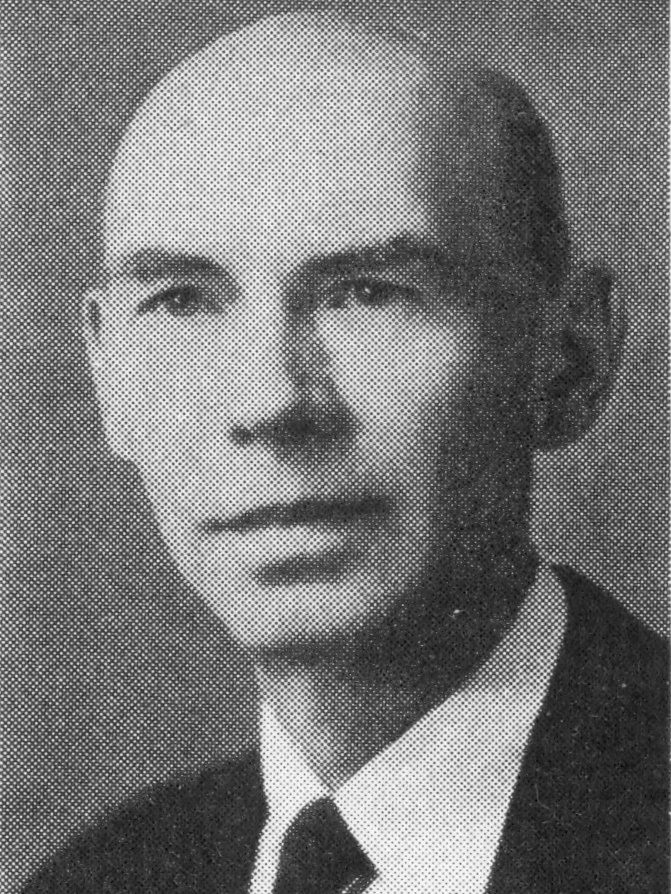
Larson circa 1940

Edwin J. Larson (November 29, 1885 – August 21, 1949) was an American politician and businessman.

Born in Waupaca, Wisconsin, Larson moved with his parents to Plymouth, Wisconsin in 1892. He graduated from Plymouth High School in 1902.

He was president of the Plymouth Refrigerator Company from 1920 to 1930. He then worked in the real estate, loans, and banking business. From 1926 to 1928, Larson served on the Plymouth Common Council. He also served on the power and light board of Plymouth Utilities. From 1939 to 1945, Larson served in the Wisconsin State Assembly as a Republican. At the time of his death, Larson was involved with the Dairy State Transportation Company. Larson died suddenly of a heart attack at his home in Plymouth, Wisconsin.
