= Willie Mueller =

American baseball player (born 1956)

- Pitcher
- Born: August 30, 1956 (age 70); West Bend, Wisconsin, U.S.
- Batted: Right Threw: Right

MLB debut
- August 12, 1978, for the Milwaukee Brewers

Last MLB appearance
- September 21, 1981, for the Milwaukee Brewers

MLB statistics
- Win–loss record: 1–0
- Strikeouts: 7
- Earned run average: 6.14
- Stats at Baseball Reference

Teams
- Milwaukee Brewers (1978–1981)

Willard Lawrence Mueller Jr. (/ˈmɪlər/; born August 30, 1956) is an American baseball coach and former Major League Baseball (MLB) pitcher. He spent his entire playing career with the Milwaukee Brewers organization (1978–1983), although in 1981, he was briefly loaned to the Denver Bears of the American Association, who were an affiliate of the Montreal Expos at the time.

== Early life and education ==
Mueller was born in West Bend, Wisconsin. Mueller attended West Bend West High School where he starred as a prep pitcher.

== Baseball career ==
Mueller was an undrafted free agent signed after the June 1974 Major League Baseball draft. Mueller made his major league debut four years later, at twenty one years old against the Boston Red Sox. Mueller's final appearance was September 20, 1981 against the Baltimore Orioles.

== Post-playing career ==
After Mueller's baseball career, he played the role of the Duke, in the 1989 blockbuster Major League. Mueller's role as the Duke was as a menacing relief pitcher for the New York Yankees.

Mueller was also the pitching coach at Concordia University Wisconsin.

== Personal life ==
Mueller resides in his home town of West Bend, Wisconsin. He has two children, Lindsey and Daniel. His daughter Lindsey was a volleyball player at Binghamton University. His son Daniel was a pitcher and shortstop for Concordia University Wisconsin. Mueller is also the uncle of former San Francisco Giants third baseman Ryan Rohlinger and Adam Rohlinger who was an All-American baseball player at Concordia University Wisconsin. Another nephew, Mike Mueller, pitched professionally in the Atlanta Braves system.
