= Watertown High School (Wisconsin) =

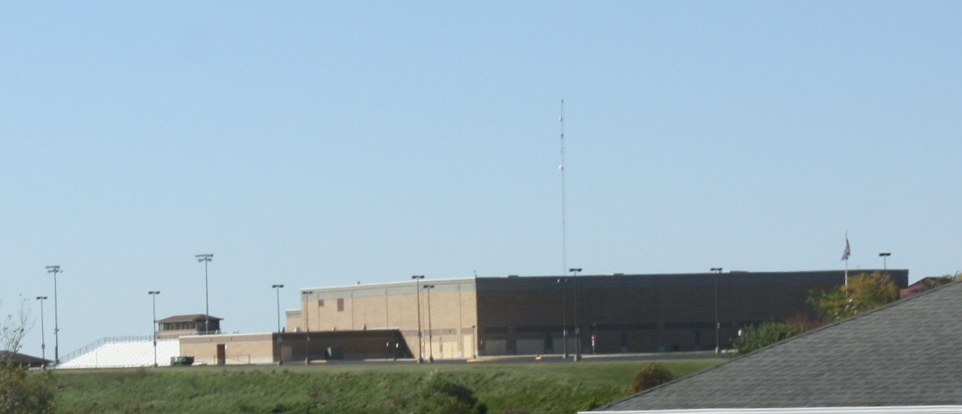
- Watertown High School

Location
- 825 Endeavour Dr. Watertown, Dodge, Wisconsin 53098-1728; United States; 43.208534°N 88.73858°W

Information
- School district: Watertown Unified School District
- Principal: Joshua Kerr
- Teaching staff: 66.80 (FTE)
- Grades: 9-12
- Enrollment: 1,087 (2023–2024)
- Student to teacher ratio: 16.27
- Schedule: Trimester
- Hours in school day: 7.5
- Colors: Blue and white
- Athletics conference: Badger Conference
- Mascot: Gosling
- Rival: Oconomowoc High School
- Yearbook: Orbit
- Website: https://www.watertown.k12.wi.us/o/whs

Watertown High School (WHS) is a high school located in Watertown, Wisconsin, in Dodge County. It serves grades nine through twelve. The school is operated by the Watertown Unified School District.

== History ==
The last high school was overcrowded and only housed the upper three grades. At the time the freshman attended Riverside Junior High School, which is now known as Riverside Middle School. There were many possible locations that were looked at for build sites, including an area near Watertown Memorial Hospital and another location on Wisconsin Highway 26. The chosen location was the latter of the two. In 2013, Watertown High School was visited by first lady Michelle Obama and Eva Longoria to encourage healthy drinking habits.

In May 2026, six days before the Watertown High School Wind Symphony's spring concert, the Watertown Unified School District's board voted 7-1 to prohibit a performance of A Mother of A Revolution! by Omar Thomas. The composition, which contains no lyrics, is dedicated to Marsha P. Johnson and references the 1969 Stonewall uprising in New York. Band director Reid LaDew had notified parents in October 2025 about the piece under the district's controversial issues policy and offered families the option for students to opt out. Initially, three students opted out; however two siblings opted back in on the condition that they only learn the piece in the classroom but not perform it in the concert. Board Vice President Sam Ouweneel argued that the composition should be removed from the concert despite LaDew following district policy. He criticized its tribute to Johnson, describing her as "a cross dressing prostitute who threw a brick at a police officer". During the special school board meeting, Ouweneel said the board's decision to remove the piece reflected the platform that board members campaigned on, which he described as "ending indoctrination and radical curriculum". The following day, approximately 350 Watertown High School students participated in a walkout protesting the school board's decision. The day before the spring concert, the school board defended their decision to remove the piece with a press release, stating it was removed due to its intention to "persuade students toward emotional alignment with the events of the Stonewall riot" and its "celebration of violence". On May 20th, students performed the piece at an event unaffiliated with the school district with Omar Thomas as their conductor.

== Athletics ==
Watertown's athletic teams are called the Goslings, and they have been members of the Badger Conference since 2017.

=== Athletic conference affiliation history ===
- Little Ten Conference (1925–1928)
- Southern Six Conference (1928–1941)
- Braveland Conference (1953–1959)
- Little Ten Conference (1959–1966)
- Southern Little Ten Conference (1966–1970)
- Wisconsin Little Ten Conference (1970–2017)
- Badger Conference (2017–present)

== Notable alumni ==
- Blaine Mueller, assistant coach for the Charlotte Hornets.
- Michael J. Schwerin, U.S. Navy admiral.
