= Eastern Collegiate Racquetball Conference =

The Eastern Collegiate Racquetball Conference, also known as the ECRC, is a college sports organization dedicated to hosting and managing collegiate racquetball tournaments in Northeastern United States.

The Eastern Collegiate Racquetball hosts four tournaments that make up the ECRC season and a Regional Championship. The first three events are in the Fall semester and the final event and Regional Championship are held in the Spring semester.

The ECRC is sponsored by RacquetWorld.com (www.racquetworld.com).

== List of Teams ==
- Berklee School of Music
- Binghamton University
- Boston University
- Bryant University
- Carnegie Mellon University
- Clarkson University
- Cornell University
- Everest College
- Fitchburg State University
- Gateway Community College
- Lehigh University
- Nichols College
- Penn State University
- Providence College
- Rensselaer Polytechnic Institute
- Rhode Island College
- Rochester Institute of Technology
- Rutgers University
- Springfield College
- SUNY Oswego
- SUNY New Paltz
- Temple University
- UMass Amherst
- UMass Lowell
- United States Coast Guard Academy
- United States Military Academy
- University of Connecticut
- University of Maine
- University of Maryland
- University of Vermont
- Western New England College
- Worcester Polytechnic Institute
