= Manitowoc Public School District =

School district in Wisconsin, United States

Location
- 2902 Lindbergh Drive; Manitowoc, Wisconsin; United States

District information
- Type: Public
- Grades: PK–12
- Superintendent: James Feil
- Schools: 11
- NCES District ID: 5508610

Students and staff
- Students: 4,641 (2023–24)
- Teachers: 360.37 (on an FTE basis)
- Staff: 640.12 (on an FTE basis) (2023–24)
- Student–teacher ratio: 12.88:1

Other information
- Website: manitowocpublicschools.org

Manitowoc Public School District (MPSD) is a public school district in Manitowoc, Wisconsin, serving Manitowoc and the surrounding area. It has about 600 teachers and other employees and enrolls about 5,100 students. Its current superintendent is Mark Holzman.

== History ==
In April 2015 a $2 million referendum was approved to increase the district's budget cap. In May 2018 MPSD approved a realignment plan that moved 9th graders to Lincoln High School, 6th graders to Washington and Wilson Junior High (renamed to Washington and Wilson Middle School), and kindergarten to local elementary schools. The plan also moves students at Stangel Elementary to Riverview Elementary (included within the Riverview Learning Community), and students at McKinley Academy to Stangel. This plan took effect in the 2019–20 school year. After East Junior High in Wisconsin Rapids closed after the 2017–18 school year, MPSD was the last school district in the state of Wisconsin whose local high school did not serve grade 9.

== Schools ==
=== Pre-K ===
- Riverview Early Learning Center (serves 3 year olds with special needs, Head Start, and 4K students)

=== Elementary schools (grades K-4) ===
- Franklin Elementary School
- Jefferson Elementary
- Monroe Elementary
- Riverview Elementary

=== Intermediate (Grades 5-6) ===
- Wilson Intermediate School

=== Middle schools (grades 7-8) ===
- Washington Middle School

=== High schools (grades 9-12) ===
- Lincoln High School
- McKinley Academy (alternative high school)

=== Charter schools ===
- Manitowoc County Comprehensive Charter School (served grades 1–8) closed in 2023.
