= Western Wisconsin Hockey Conference =

Wisconsin high school hockey conference

The Western Wisconsin Hockey Conference is a high school athletic conference sponsoring boys hockey in west central Wisconsin. Founded for the 2025-26 season, the conference and its member schools are affiliated with the Wisconsin Interscholastic Athletic Association.

== History ==
The Western Wisconsin Hockey Conference was formed in 2025 by six schools from two conferences who previously sponsored their own hockey competitions: the Coulee Conference (Black River Falls, Viroqua and West Salem) and the Mississippi Valley Conference (Avalanche Hockey, Onalaska and Tomah/Sparta). Both conferences only had three schools each, which created difficulties in creating a full conference schedule. This new arrangement is intended to increase conference games from four to ten per season and allow for the scheduling of more games against opponents within the region.

== List of conference members ==
Program	Location	Nickname	Colors	Host School	Co-operative Members	Joined
Avalanche Hockey	La Crosse, WI	Avalanche		Aquinas	Cochrane-Fountain City, Gale-Ettrick-Trempealeau, Holmen, Luther	2025
Black River Falls	Black River Falls, WI	Tigers		Black River Falls	Melrose-Mindoro, Neillsville	2025
Onalaska/ La Crosse	Onalaska, WI	Hilltoppers		Onalaska	La Crosse Central, La Crosse Logan	2025
Tomah/Sparta	Tomah, WI	Titans		Tomah	Sparta	2025
Viroqua	Viroqua, WI	Blackhawks		Viroqua	Cashton, De Soto, Westby	2025
West Salem	West Salem, WI	Panthers		West Salem	Bangor	2025

== Membership map ==
Western Wisconsin Hockey Conference
Location of Western Wisconsin Hockey Conference members:
1 Avalanche Hockey
2 Black River Falls
3 Onalaska/La Crosse
4 Tomah/Sparta
5 Viroqua
6 West Salem

== List of conference champions ==
Program	Quantity	Years
Onalaska/ La Crosse	1	2026
Avalanche Hockey	0	
Black River Falls	0	
Tomah/Sparta	0	
Viroqua	0	
West Salem	0	
