= Pewaukee School District =

School district in Wisconsin, United States

Coordinates: 43°04′33″N 88°15′44″W

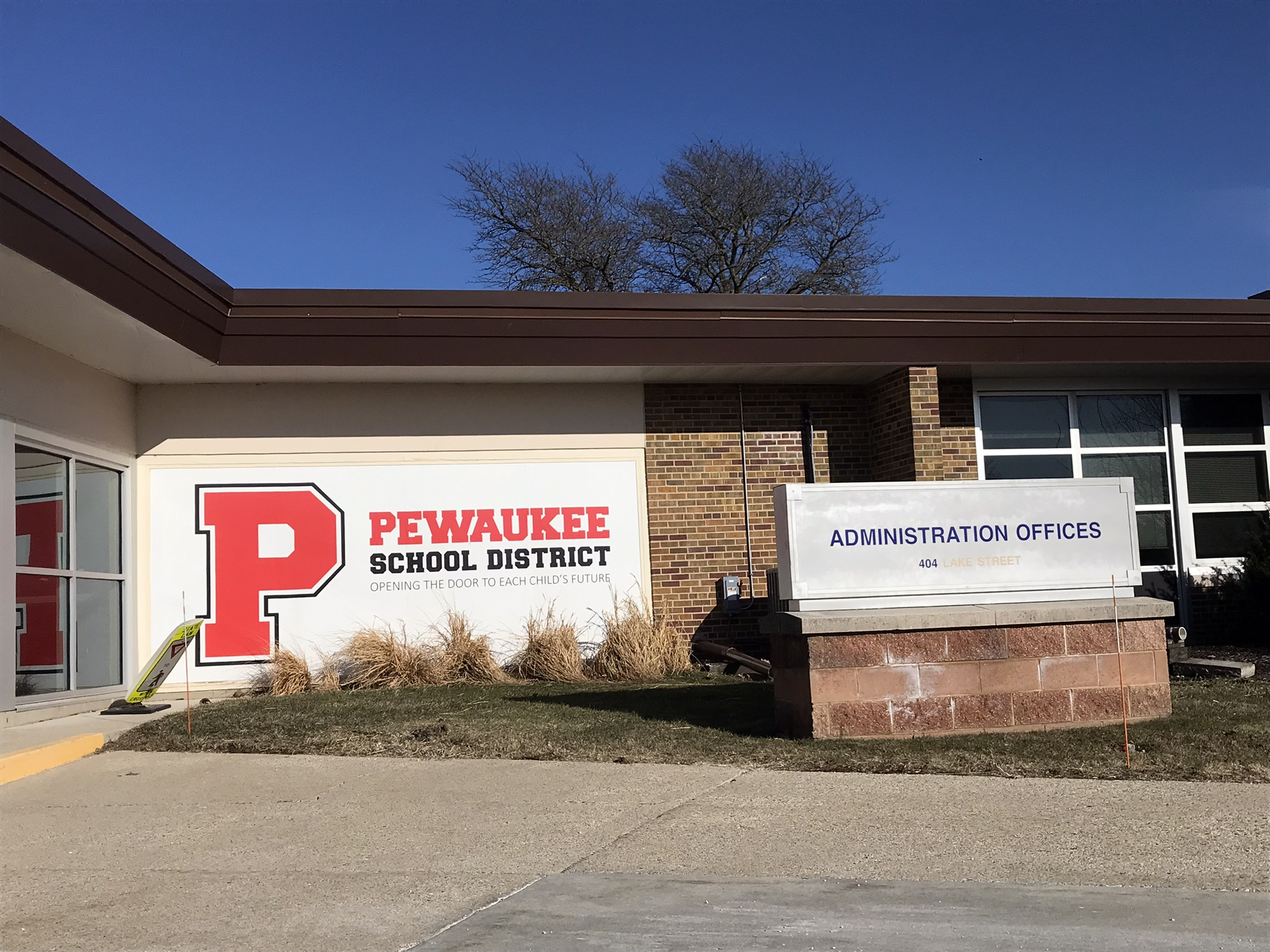

Address
- 404 Lake St Pewaukee, Wisconsin, 53072; United States

District information
- Type: Public
- Motto: Opening the door to each child's future
- Grades: PK–12th grade
- Established: 1840
- Superintendent: Mike Cady
- Schools: 4
- Budget: $45 million USD (2021–22)
- NCES District ID: 5511640

Students and staff
- Students: 2,907 (2024–25)
- Teachers: 189.50 (on an FTE basis)
- Student–teacher ratio: 15.34
- Athletic conference: Woodland Conference
- Colors: Red, Black and White

Other information
- Schedule: Block schedule
- Website: www.pewaukeeschools.org

The Pewaukee School District is located in central Waukesha County, Wisconsin. The district serves the village and city of Pewaukee, Wisconsin. The district has 2,907 students. Faculty and staff number 333. It twice received the Wisconsin Forward Award at the mastery level.

== Schools ==
- Pewaukee Lake Elementary School serves students in early childhood through 2nd grade.
- Horizon Elementary serves grades 3 to 5.
- Asa Clark Middle School (ACMS) serves grades 6 to 8. Asa Clark's sports include volleyball, basketball, football, a dance squad, wrestling, cross country, and track and field. The school's extra-curricular opportunities include Art Club, Drama Club, Forensics, Math Counts, LEGO Robotics, an in-house robotics club, Honors Choir, Yearbook Club, Chess Club, Choiristers and Jazz Ensemble, Math Olympiads, Mountain-biking Club, Ski Club, Strength and Conditioning, Student Council, and River Keepers.

=== Pewaukee High School ===
The school has a network of computers, smartboards, and projectors. The school has some online classes, such as introductory C++, Java, and AP Computer Science. The foreign languages department included French, Spanish and Mandarin Chinese. Advanced Placement classes are offered.

PHS is a WIAA Division 2 school in all sports except football, track and field, cross country, tennis, and boys volleyball in which it is a Division 1 school. The school has two softball fields, two football fields, a track, and two soccer fields. The Pewaukee Pirates compete in the Woodland Conference, with a new move to the Classic 8 Conference for 2024-25 for the football team. The football team made the playoffs from 2005 to 2008. In 2021, the Pewaukee Pirates won the WIAA Division 3 state football championship against Rice Lake with a final score of 15–6. The boys' basketball team coached by David Burkemper won three successive Division 2 State Titles from 2020-2021 to 2022-2023, was the WIAA Division 2 State Runner-Up in 2000–2001, and has won 15 conference championships (1926, 1931, 1961, 1999, 2001, 2008, 2009, 2010, 2012, 2017, 2018, 2020, 2021, 2022, 2023). In 2008, 2012, and 2013 the dance team came in first place in state in their division. The girls' cross country team won the state meet in 2001, 2002, 2003, 2009 and 2015. The boys' cross country team won the state meet in 2015. The wrestling team has been conference champion eight consecutive years.

=== Conference affiliation history ===
- Little Five Conference (1926-1927)
- Little Seven Conference (1926-1934)
- 4-C Conference (1934-1953)
- Southeastern Wisconsin Conference (1953-1959)
- Scenic Moraine Conference (1959-1980)
- Parkland Conference (1980-2006)
- Woodland Conference (2006-present)

In Academic Decathlon, PHS is a Division 2 school. In the 2017–2018 school year, the Pewaukee High School Academic Decathlon team took third overall in the state-wide competition. The team also came first in their division, and took the state title for Division 2. Due to this success, the team had the opportunity to advance on to the national competition where the competing members were able to place third overall in their division country-wide. The 2017–2018 school year was the most successful year for the Pewaukee High School Academic Decathlon team to date. The theme for the 2017–2018 school year was Africa and focused on the history, literature, science, social science, economics, music, and art of the greater region. In the 2006–2007 school year, the team placed sixth in the state. At the 2007 state competition, the Pewaukee Academic Decathlon team ranked eighth in Wisconsin and took the state title for Division 2. In the 2007–2008 school year, when the topic was the Civil War, the team placed third overall at the state competition, winning the state division title. It also placed third in the Super Quiz Oral Relay.

== Notable alumni ==
- Mel Eslyn, film producer
- Jack Gohlke, basketball player
- Ben Landry, rugby union player
- Milan Momcilovic, basketball player for the Iowa State Cyclones
- Chris McIntosh, former offensive tackle for the Seattle Seahawks and current athletic director at the University of Wisconsin-Madison
- Derek Watt, former NFL fullback
- J. J. Watt, former NFL defensive end and current NFL studio analyst
- T. J. Watt, NFL linebacker for the Pittsburgh Steelers
