= Glacier Trails Conference =

Wisconsin high school athletic conference

The Glacier Trails Conference is a high school athletic conference with its membership concentrated on the northern outskirts of the Milwaukee metropolitan area. It began competition during the 2025-26 school year, and the conference is affiliated with the Wisconsin Interscholastic Athletic Association.

== History ==
The Glacier Trails Conference was formed in preparation for the 2025-26 school year, and consists of seven high schools. Three members (Kettle Moraine Lutheran, Kewaskum and Plymouth) left the defunct East Central Conference to help form the new conference. The other four schools to enter the league came from the North Shore Conference (Port Washington, West Bend East and West Bend West) and the Fox River Classic Conference (Sheboygan South). The Glacier Trails Conference was named after the glaciers that shaped the Kettle Moraine, a geological region that coincides with the geographic footprint of the conference. Grafton is set to become members of the Glacier Trails Conference per the WIAA Board of Control's ruling in March 2026, leaving their current affiliation in the North Shore Conference. A few weeks later, the West Bend School District announced the pending merger of West Bend East and West Bend West into a single high school. All changes are due to take effect for the 2027-28 school year.

Football competition began with the 2026-2027 WIAA realignment cycle, and all members with the exception of Sheboygan South will were inaugural participants. The addition of North Shore Conference members Grafton (currently affiliated with the Woodland Conference for football) and Nicolet brought the conference's football membership to eight schools.

== List of conference members ==
=== Current full members ===
School	Location	Affiliation	Enrollment	Mascot	Colors	Joined
Kettle Moraine Lutheran	Jackson, WI	Private (WELS)	631	Chargers		2025
Kewaskum	Kewaskum, WI	Public	608	Indians		2025
Plymouth	Plymouth, WI	Public	708	Panthers		2025
Port Washington	Port Washington, WI	Public	799	Pirates		2025
Sheboygan South (Note: Football-only member of the Fox River Classic Conference)	Sheboygan, WI	Public	1,204	Redwings		2025
West Bend East (Note: Merging into a single high school for the 2027-28 school year)	West Bend, WI	Public	815	Suns		2025
West Bend West	West Bend, WI	Public	1,003	Spartans		2025

=== Current associate members ===
School	Location	Affiliation	Mascot	Colors	Primary Conference	Sport(s)
Grafton	Grafton, WI	Public	Black Hawks		North Shore	Football
Kiel	Kiel, WI	Public	Raiders		Eastern Wisconsin	Girls Golf
Nicolet	Glendale, WI	Public	Knights		North Shore	Football

=== Future full members ===
School	Location	Affiliation	Enrollment	Mascot	Colors	Joining	Former Conference
Grafton	Grafton, WI	Public	728	Black Hawks		2027	North Shore
West Bend	West Bend, WI	Public	TBD	TBD	TBD	2027	New school created from merger of West Bend East and West Bend West

== Membership map ==
Glacier Trails Conference
Location of Glacier Trails Conference full members:
1 Kettle Moraine Lutheran
2 Kewaskum
3 Plymouth
4 Port Washington
5 Sheboygan South
6 West Bend East
7 West Bend West

== Sponsored sports ==
	Baseball	Boys Basketball	Girls Basketball	Boys Cross Country	Girls Cross Country	Football	Boys Golf	Girls Golf	Boys Soccer	Girls Soccer	Softball	Boys Swim & Dive	Boys Tennis	Girls Tennis	Boys Track & Field	Girls Track & Field	Girls Volleyball	Boys Wrestling	Girls Wrestling
Kettle Moraine Lutheran	●	●	●	●	●	●	●	●	●	●	●				●	●	●	●	●
Kewaskum	●	●	●	●	●	●	●	●	●	●	●		●	●	●	●	●	●	●
Plymouth	●	●	●	●	●	●	●	●	●	●	●	●	●	●	●	●	●	●	●
Port Washington	●	●	●	●	●	●	●		●	●	●	●	●	●	●	●	●	●	●
Sheboygan South	●	●	●	●	●		●		●	●	●	● (Note: Co-operative with Sheboygan Falls)	●	●	●	●	●	●	●
West Bend East	●	●	●	●	●	●	●		●		●		●	●	●	●	●		
West Bend West	●	●	●	●	●	●	●	● (Note: Co-operative with West Bend East)	●	●	●	●	●	●	●	●	●	●	●

== List of conference champions ==
=== Boys Basketball ===
School	Quantity	Years
Port Washington	1	2026
Kettle Moraine Lutheran	0	
Kewaskum	0	
Plymouth	0	
Sheboygan South	0	
West Bend East	0	
West Bend West	0	

=== Girls Basketball ===
School	Quantity	Years
Kettle Moraine Lutheran	1	2026
Kewaskum	0	
Plymouth	0	
Port Washington	0	
Sheboygan South	0	
West Bend East	0	
West Bend West	0	

=== Football ===
School	Quantity	Years
Port Washington	1	2026
Grafton	0	
Nicolet	0	
Kettle Moraine Lutheran	0	
Kewaskum	0	
Plymouth	0	
West Bend East	0	
West Bend West	0	
