= Mayville High School (Wisconsin) =

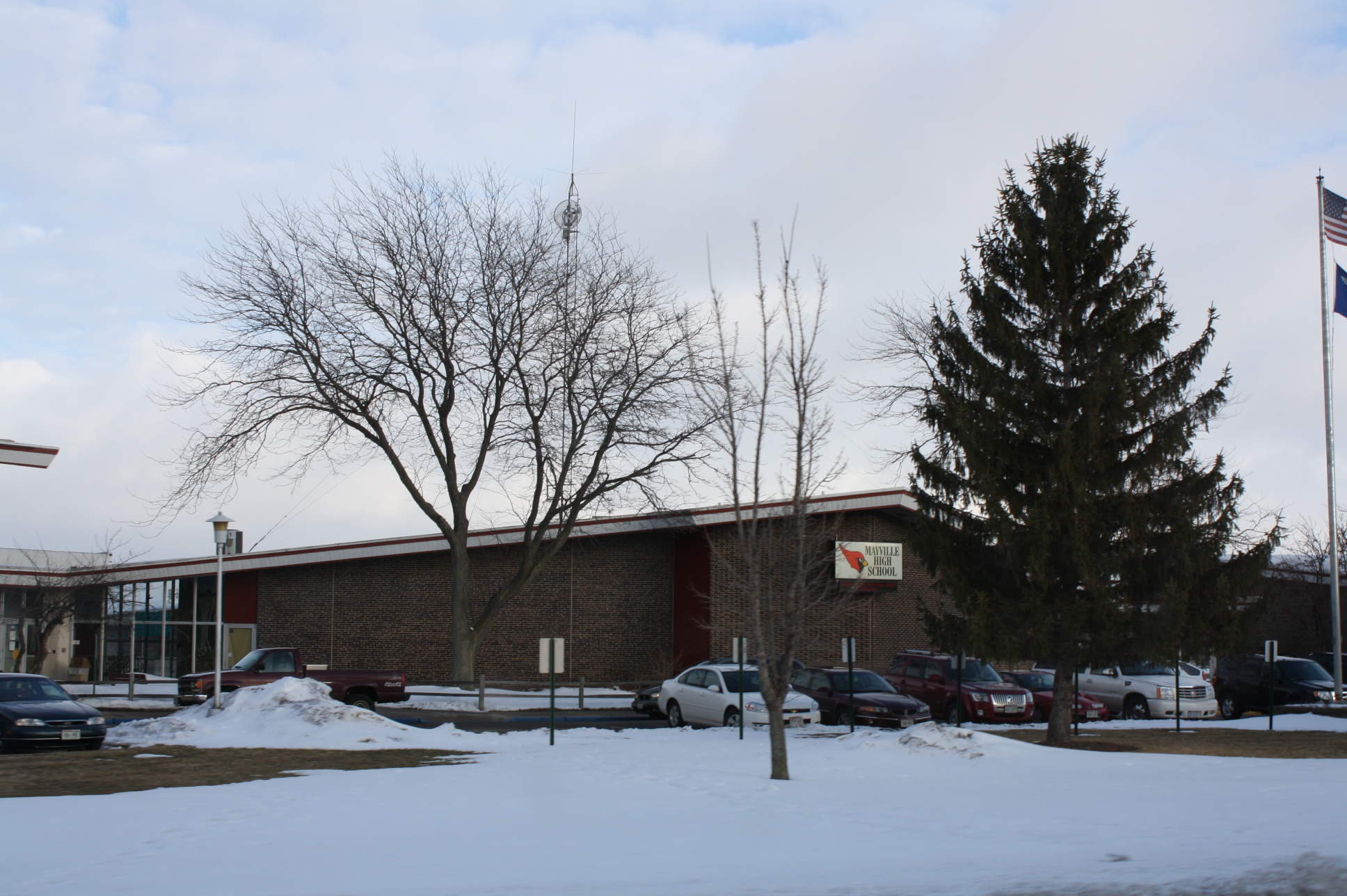
- The school in 2010

Location
- 500 North Clark Street; Mayville, WI 53050-1055; USA
- Coordinates: 43.504484°N 88.555250°W

Information
- Type: Public secondary
- Motto: Alive in Learning
- School district: Mayville School District
- Principal: Bob Clark
- Teaching staff: 33.31 (on an FTE basis)
- Grades: 9–12
- Enrollment: 502 (2023-2024)
- Student to teacher ratio: 15.07
- Colors: Cardinal and white
- Athletics conference: Wisconsin Flyway
- Mascot: Big Red
- Nickname: Cardinals
- Rival: Lomira
- Yearbook: Timeless
- Website: Mayville High School

Mayville High School is a public high school located in Mayville, Wisconsin, United States. It serves grades 9 through 12 and is the only high school in the Mayville School District.

== History ==
The original Mayville High School was built around 1850 as a one-room schoolhouse that housed all grades. The current building was built in 1964.

After a failed 2015 referendum, a 2017 referendum to add a STEAM addition to the school passed; construction began in April 2018.

In 2015, a possible plan for consolidation with Horicon High School in Horicon, Wisconsin was presented, but the plan never made it past plan stage due to a lack of interest from Horicon.

== Demographics ==
The school is 94 percent white, with Hispanics accounting for four percent of the student body and all other races combining for the other two percent. About a quarter of students qualify for free or reduced lunch.

== Academics ==
MHS students have the opportunity to take Advanced Placement classes. About a third of students take part in AP classes.

== Athletics ==
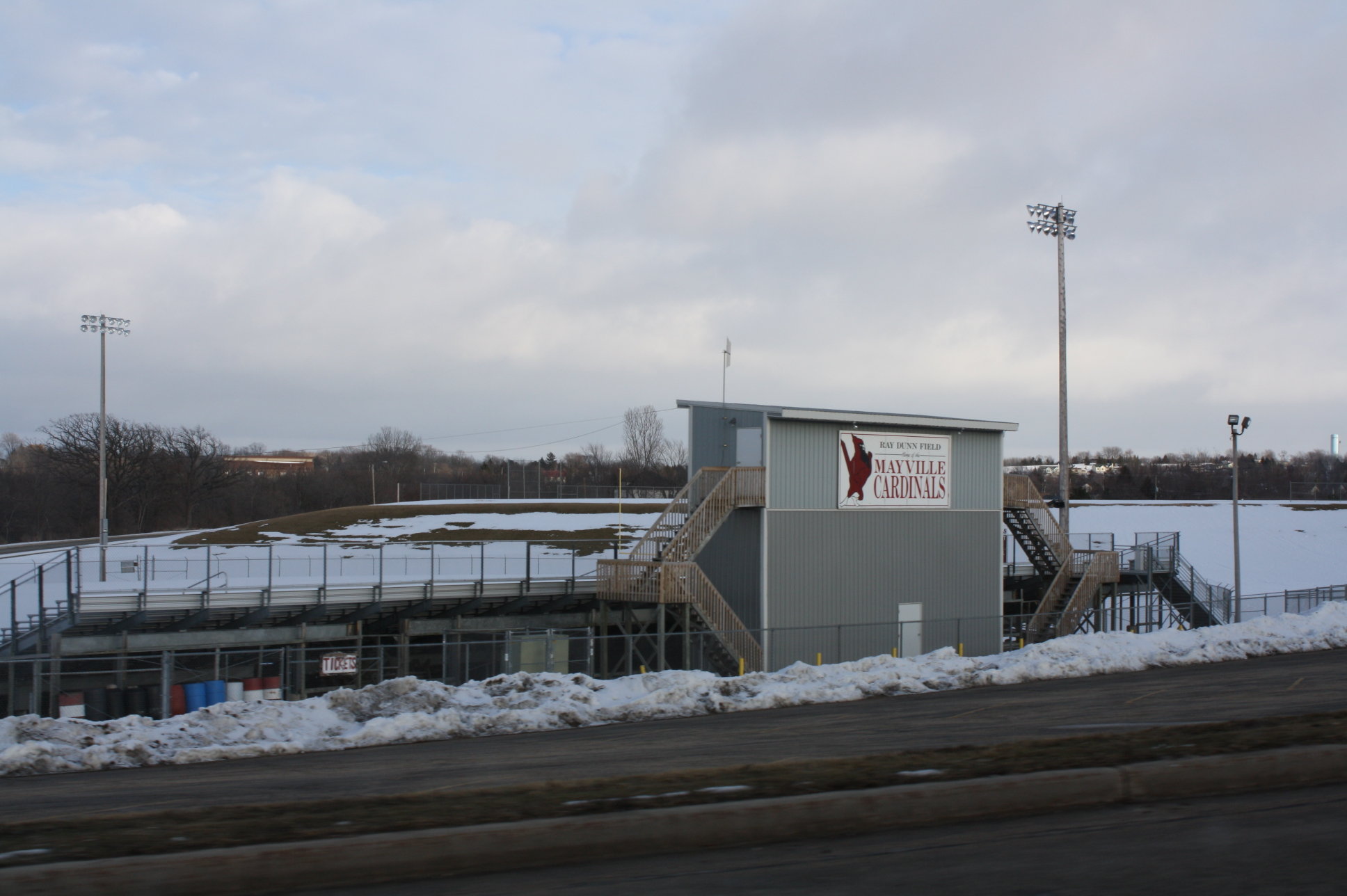
Athletic stadium

The Cardinals compete in the Wisconsin Flyway Conference, and fluctuate between divisions two through four for various sports.

=== Athletic conference affiliation history ===
- Little Ten Conference (1925-1966)
- Northern Little Ten Conference (1966-1970)
- Scenic Moraine Conference (1970-1980)
- Flyway Conference (1980-2001)
- East Central Flyway Conference (2001-2006)
- Wisconsin Flyway Conference (2006–present)

== Extracurricluars ==
MHS has a competitive mixed-gender show choir, the Cardinal Singers, and at one point had a competitive girls-only show choir. Cardinal Singers has won competitions as recently as 2016.

== Notable alumni ==
- Dick Lange, professional basketball player
