= Cedarburg High School =

Location
- W68 N611 Evergreen Blvd; Cedarburg, Wisconsin 53012-1899; United States
- Coordinates: 43.29791°N 87.9957°W

Information
- Type: Public secondary education
- Principal: Casey Bowe
- Teaching staff: 65.52 (FTE)
- Grades: 9–12
- Enrollment: 1,085 (2023–2024)
- Student to teacher ratio: 16.56
- Campus: Suburban
- Colors: Orange and black
- Athletics conference: North Shore Conference
- Mascot: Jaime "The Bulldog" Newton
- Nickname: Bulldogs
- Rival: Grafton
- Yearbook: Cedariel
- Website: Cedarburg High School

Cedarburg High School (CHS) is a Public Education High School in Cedarburg, Wisconsin.

== Curriculum ==
Classes offered at Cedarburg High School are grouped into 13 departments: art, business and information technology, engineering/technology education, English, family and consumer education, foreign language, health, mathematics, music, physical education, science, social studies and special education departments. Foreign languages taught at the school include French, German and Spanish. As of 2015, 22 AP classes were offered.

== Facilities ==
Since the completion of the current school building in 1956, the campus has expanded several times. In 2002, construction was completed on a project that included an eight-lane swimming pool with diving well, a field house with a 160-meter track, and several basketball courts. In the 2006–07 academic year, the outdoor track and football stadium were renovated. A 3,500-seat stadium was constructed and an 8-lane synthetic track was installed. The majority of the funds for this reconstruction was provided by the Cedarburg Athletic Booster Club and private donors. The school has over ten acres of irrigated land designated for team practices.

== Extracurricular activities ==
Cedarburg High School has over 25 student clubs, including AFS, Art Club, Badminton Club, Bridge Builders, Chess Club, Coding Club, Community Service Club, Debate, Drama Club, Economics Team, Engineering Club, Envirothon, Forensics, French Club, German Club, LEAD, Math Team, National History Day, NHS, Poetry Club, Pep Club, Science Club, Ski Club, Spanish Club and Student Council.

=== Marching band ===
The Cedarburg High School marching band first attended the WSMA State Marching Band Championships in 2008 as a critique-only band. In 2009, the CHS marching band's first competitive year, they were placed fourth out of eight bands in class AAA. In the years since, the CHS marching band has placed 3rd four times and 2nd twice.

=== Athletics ===
Cedarburg High School has 51 athletic teams, in which over 700 students participate. The Bulldogs compete in the North Shore Conference and participate in Wisconsin Interscholastic Athletic Association (WIAA), with the exception of boys' and girls' skiing, and girls' dance team and cheerleading, the latter of which are under the Wisconsin Association of Cheer and Pom Coaches (WACPC).

The following sports are offered at CHS:

Fall	Winter	Spring
Boys' soccer	Boys' basketball	Boys' and girls' track
American football	Girls' basketball	Boys' tennis
Boys' and girls' cross country	Boys' swimming	Girls' softball
Girls' swimming	Boys' hockey	Girls' soccer
Girls' tennis	Gymnastics	Boys' and girls' golf
Girls' volleyball	Cheerleading	Baseball (summer league)
Boys' volleyball	Dance team
Boys' and girls' skiing
Color guard	Wrestling
Mountain Biking	Winter guard

=== Conference affiliation history ===
- Little Seven Conference (1927-1934)
- 4-C Conference (1934-1953)
- Braveland Conference (1953-1985)
- North Shore Conference (1985–present)

== Notable alumni ==
- Paul Clement (born 1966), former United States Solicitor General, acted as Attorney General for one day, also led the effort by 26 states to overturn the Patient Protection and Affordable Care Act
- Amadeus William Grabau (1870-1946), paleontologist, geologist, expatriate in China
- Carl Kiekhaefer (1906-1983), founder of Kiekhaefer Marine (later Mercury Marine)
- Casey Nogueira (born 1989), member of the US Women's soccer team, and leading scorer of the 2008 UNC women's soccer team
- Jonathan Stiever, MLB pitcher for the Chicago White Sox
- Todd Thomas (1959-2000), former professional football player who was inducted into the Cedarburg High School Athletic Hall of Fame in 2014
- Josh Thompson (born 1978), country singer
