= Plymouth High School (Wisconsin) =

Coordinates: 43.744994°N 87.959537°W

- 125 S. Highland Avenue; Plymouth, Wisconsin 53073-2599

Information
- Type: Public
- School district: Plymouth Joint School District
- Principal: Joseph Brandl
- Teaching staff: 53.37 (FTE)
- Grades: 9-12
- Enrollment: 733 (2023-2024)
- Student to teacher ratio: 13.73
- Colors: Black and orange
- Mascot: Panther
- Athletic conference: Glacier Trails
- Website: www.plymouth.k12.wi.us

Plymouth Comprehensive High School (commonly referred to as Plymouth High School) is a public comprehensive high school located in Plymouth, Wisconsin. It serves grades 9-12 and is part of the Plymouth Joint School District.

With an enrollment of approximately 800 students and 53 full-time teachers, Plymouth High School has a 94 percent graduation rate. More than two-thirds of Plymouth graduates pursue higher education. Plymouth High School offers college credit courses.

== Enrollment ==
From 2000–2019, high school enrollment declined 20.6%.

Enrollment at Plymouth High School, 2000–2019

== Athletics ==
Plymouth's athletic teams are called the Panthers, and they joined the Glacier Trails Conference in 2025.

=== Athletic conference affiliation history ===
- Eastern Wisconsin Conference (1923-1970)
- Packerland Conference (1970-1979)
- Eastern Wisconsin Conference (1979-2015)
- East Central Conference (2015-2025)
- Glacier Trails Conference (2025-present)

== Notable alumni ==
- Tony Evers, American politician and educator, 46th Governor of Wisconsin
- Beau Hoopman, Olympic rower who won gold in Athens 2004 and bronze in Beijing 2008 in the men's eights.
- Edwin J. Larson, Wisconsin businessman and politician
- Tyler Vorpagel (class of 2003), Wisconsin state legislator
