= West Bend School District =

School district in Wisconsin, United States

West Bend Joint School District #1

Location
- 735 South Main Street; West Bend, Wisconsin; United States

District information
- Type: Public
- Grades: PK - 12
- Superintendent: Jennifer Wimmer
- Schools: 9
- NCES District ID: 5516290

Students and staff
- Students: 5,961 (2021-2022)
- Teachers: 385.79 (2021-2022) (on an FTE basis)
- Staff: 262.05 (2021-2022) (on an FTE basis)
- Student–teacher ratio: 15.45:1

Other information
- Website: www.wbsd-schools.org

The West Bend School District (officially West Bend Joint School District #1) is a school district in Wisconsin serving the city of West Bend, the village of Newburg, most of the village of Jackson, all of the towns of Trenton, and parts of the towns of Polk, Barton, West Bend, Jackson, and Addison.

As of the 2019-2020 school year, the district served more than 6,000 students.

== High schools ==
The district has two high schools, East and West, which share one building. Each school has about 1,100 students. The two high schools were formed in 1970, but proposals for merging the schools have been raised since the 1980s. Incoming freshmen born on even-numbered dates attend West Bend East while those born on odd-numbered dates attend West Bend West. Students with siblings already in high school follow their eldest sibling, so all children from a family attend the same high school. The high schools have different students, teachers, and sports teams, but share an auditorium, music department, gymnasium complex, and natatorium (in-door pool). In athletics, both East and West participate in the North Shore Conference.

Every two years, in partnership with the West Bend police and fire departments, the high schools hold the two-day Every 15 Minutes program for juniors and seniors, which challenges them to think about drinking, driving, personal safety, and the responsibility of making mature decisions. In partnership with the city's police and fire departments, a mock DUI crash is held on East Decorah Road.

West Bend East

West Bend East's athletic teams are known as the Suns. The school's colors are maroon and gold. In 2024 East was ranked 36th in Wisconsin and 1430th nationally.

West Bend West

West Bend West's athletic teams are known as the Spartans. The school's colors are blue and white. In 2024 West was ranked 50th in Wisconsin and 1860th nationally.

Merger

On March 23rd, 2026, The School Board unanimously agreed to merge the two schools into one beginning in the 2027-28 school year.

== Schools ==
=== High schools ===
- West Bend East High School (9-12)
- West Bend West High School (9-12)

=== Intermediate school ===
- Silverbrook Intermediate School - grades 5-6 (soon to be K-4)

=== Middle school ===
- Badger Middle School - grades 7-8

=== Elementary schools ===
- Decorah Elementary School (K-5)
- Fair Park Elementary School (K-5)
- Green Tree Elementary School (K-4)
- Jackson Elementary School (K-4)
- McLane Elementary School (K-4)

=== Other ===
- 4K Program using Community-Based Providers
- Head Start for Washington County
- Rolfs Education Center (3- and 4-year-old Head Start)

== Notable alumni ==
- Louis A. Arnold, HVAC worker and Socialist Wisconsin state senator
- Bob Gannon, businessman and Wisconsin state Representative
- Ward Christensen (1945–2024), computer scientist
- Otto Kehrein, carpenter and Socialist Wisconsin state Representative
- Willie Mueller, pitcher for the Milwaukee Brewers and actor in the movie Major League
- Ryan Rohlinger, the third baseman for the San Francisco Giants.
- Henry O. Schowalter, lawyer and Democratic Wisconsin state Representative
- Dave Steckel, hockey player for the New Jersey Devils
- Viola S. Wendt, poet and educator
