= Port Washington High School (Wisconsin) =

Location
- 427 West Jackson Street; Port Washington, Wisconsin 53074; United States
- Coordinates: 43.3901°N 87.8777°W

Information
- Type: Public secondary
- Motto: "Home of the Pirates" "The School That Maher Built"
- School district: Port Washington-Saukville School District
- Superintendent: Mel Nettesheim
- Principal: Rachel Biertzer
- Teaching staff: 57.13 (FTE)
- Grades: 9–12
- Enrollment: 804 (2023–2024)
- Student to teacher ratio: 14.07
- Colors: Green, Black, and White
- Athletics conference: Glacier Trails Conference
- Nickname: Pirates
- Website: https://www.pwssd.org/schools/pwhs/

Port Washington High School is a public secondary high school in the city of Port Washington, Wisconsin and a part of the Port Washington-Saukville School District. The enrollment during the 2022–23 school year was 825.

Eric Burke served as the principal until February 2020. In March 2020 Thad Gabrielse became the principal. Rachel Biertzer has served as principal since the 2022-23 school year.

== Athletics ==
Port Washington High School participates in the Glacier Trails Conference after previously competing in the East Central Conference. PWHS won state championships in boys' cross country in 1933, 1956, 1957 and 1960, and in boys’ basketball in 1936.

=== Athletic conference affiliation history ===
- Little Seven Conference (1927-1930)
- Braveland Conference (1953-1985)
- North Shore Conference (1985-2025)
- Glacier Trails Conference (2025–present)

== Alumni ==
- A. Manette Ansay, author
- Tyler Beach, NFL football guard for the Pittsburgh Steelers
- Ray Buivid, former NFL football player and college football All-American
- John DeMerit, former MLB baseball player and World Series champion
- Alex Dieringer, state champion wrestler; NCAA champion while at Oklahoma State University; 2016 Dan Hodge Trophy Winner
- Josh Gasser, Wisconsin Gatorade Player of the Year; Big Ten All–Defensive team (2012, 2014, 2015)
- George Klassen, baseball player in the Los Angeles Angels organization
