= List of high school athletic conferences in Wisconsin =

The following is a list of high school athletic conferences in Wisconsin. All of the following are overseen by the Wisconsin Interscholastic Athletic Association (WIAA). The listed district for each conference is designated by WIAA, who divided the state into seven portions: District 1 is Northwest, District 2 is Northeast, District 3 is West Central, District 4 is East Central, District 5 is Southwest, District 6 is South Central, and District 7 is Southeast. The divisions column denotes the division(s) the conference uses for basketball.

== Current all-sport conferences ==
Conference	Founded	Members	Division(s)	District(s)
Badger Conference	1952	16	1–3	3, 5, 6
Bay Conference	1970	9	1–3	2, 4
Big East Conference	2015	14	3–5	4, 6
Big Eight Conference	1925	10	1	5–6
Big Rivers Conference	1956	8	1–2	1–3
Capitol Conference	1969	12	3–4	3, 5, 6
Central Wisconsin Conference	1926	22	3–5	2–4
Classic 8 Conference	1997	8	1–2	6–7
Cloverbelt Conference	1927	17	3–5	1–3
Coulee Conference	1926	7	3	2, 3, 5
Dairyland Conference	1959	11	4–5	1–3
Dunn-St. Croix Conference	1930	9	3–4	1, 3
Eastern Wisconsin Conference	1979	8	2–4	4, 6
Fox River Classic Conference	2007	10	1–2	2, 4
Fox Valley Association	1970	10	1–2	2, 4
Glacier Trails Conference	2025	7	1–3	4, 6, 7
Great Northern Conference	2008	8	2–3	1–3
Greater Metro Conference	1997	9	1	6–7
Heart O'North Conference	1928	10	2-4	1,3
Indian Trails Conference	1963	10	Non-WIAA	Non-WIAA
Lake City Conference	2021	11	2-3, 5	7
Lakeland Conference	1934	16	4–5	1, 3
Marawood Conference	1949	12	4–5	1–3
Marinette & Oconto Conference	1927	9	3–5	2, 4
Metro Classic Conference	2012	8	3–5	6–7
Middle Border Conference	1931	8	2–4	1, 3
Midwest Classic Conference	1983	12	2–4	6–7
Milwaukee City Conference	1893	21	1–3	6–7
Mississippi Valley Conference	1989	7	2, 4	5
North Eastern Conference	2015	9	2–3	2, 4
North Shore Conference	1985	7	1–2	4, 6, 7
Northern Lakes Conference	1926	7	4-5	2
Northern Lights Conference	1936	10	5	1–2
Packerland Conference	1970	9	3–5	2, 4
Park Ridge Conference	2026	8	1-2	7
Ridge & Valley Conference	1979	8	5	3, 5
Rock Valley Conference	1969	11	2–3	5–6
Scenic Bluffs Conference	1979	8	4–5	3, 5
Six Rivers Conference	1997	14	4–5	5–6
South Central Conference	1952	8	3–4	2, 3, 6
Southeast Conference	1993	7	1	6–7
Southern Lakes Conference	1953	8	1–2	5–7
Southwest Wisconsin Conference	2005	6	3–4	5
Southwest Wisconsin Activities League	1925	8	4–5	5
Trailways Conference	2001	23	4–5	3–7
Wisconsin Flyway Conference	2006	9	3–4	4, 6
Wisconsin Valley Conference	1921	6	1–2	1–3
Woodland Conference	1993	10	2–3	4, 6, 7

== Former all-sport conferences ==
Conference	Founded	Disbanded
3-C Conference	1928	1962
4-C Conference	1934	1953
7-C Conference	1926	1962
10-12 Conference	1946	1948
Badger Lutheran Conference	1961	1964
Baraboo Valley League	1928	1929
Bay-Lakes Conference	1970	1979
Bi-County League	1928	1959
Big Nine Conference	1985	1993
Black Hawk League	1930	1997
Braveland Conference	1953	1993
Central Lakes Conference	1952	1962
Central Lakeshore Conference	1969	2015
Central State Conference	1962	1984
Central Wisconsin Catholic Conference	1956	2000
Classic Conference	1973	1983
Dual County Conference	1926	2001
East Central Conference	1970	2001
East Central Conference	2015	2025
East Central Flyway Conference	2001	2007
Eastern Suburban Conference	1969	2001
Eastern Valley Conference	2007	2015
Eastern Wisconsin Conference	1923	1970
Flambeau League	1939	1970
Flambeau-Soo League	1942	1947
Flambeauland Conference	1946	1955
Flyway Conference	1970	2001
Fox River Valley Conference	1923	2007
Fox Valley Catholic Conference	1929	1971
Fox Valley Christian Conference	1971	1999
Fox Valley Tri-County League	1924	1970
Gateway Conference	1941	1952
Granite Valley Conference	1945	1951
Granite Valley Conference	1954	1960
Head of the Lakes Conference	1918	1954
I-W League	1960	1964
Iowa County League	1927	1960
Juneau County League	1926	1958
Kettle Moraine Conference	1928	1969
Kickapoo Valley League	1907	1971
Lakeshore Conference	1997	2008
Little Eight Conference	1926	1937
Little Five Conference	1929	1935
Little Nine Conference	1928	1970
Little Seven Conference	1926	1934
Little Ten Conference	1925	1970
Lumberjack Conference	1953	2008
Madison City Series	1923	2017
Madison Suburban Conference	1926	1969
Marathon County League	1928	1949
Menominee Valley Conference	1945	1947
Metro Conference	1974	1997
Michigan-Wisconsin Conference	1937	1973
Mid-Eastern Conference	1952	1970
Mid-Valley Conference	1946	1950
Midwest Prep Conference	1940	1983
Milwaukee Catholic Conference	1930	1974
Mississippi Valley Conference	1933	1965
Mississippi Valley Triangular League	1936	1940
Monroe-Vernon Conference	1928	1958
Nicolet Conference	1938	1942
Northeastern Wisconsin Conference	1927	1970
Northern Wisconsin Conference	1955	1956
Northwest Border Conference	1940	1956
Olympian Conference	1970	2015
Parkland Conference	1963	2006
Peninsula Conference	1933	1970
Rock River Valley League	1922	1952
Scenic Central Conference	1958	1979
Soo Line League	1931	1943
South Central Conference	1926	1941
South Shore Conference	1970	1980
Southeastern Badger Conference	1963	1970
Southeastern Wisconsin Conference	1928	1963
Southern Eight Conference	1971	1987
Southern Five Conference	1928	1946
Southern Regional Conference	1937	1958
Southern Six Conference	1928	1941
Southern Ten Conference	1941	1952
State Line League	1927	1997
Suburban Conference	1925	1985
Suburban Park Conference	1985	1993
SWANI Conference	1946	1952
SWAPS Conference	1957	1961
SWISS Conference	1982	2006
Trempealeau Valley Conference	1927	1959
Tri-County League	1923	1963
Upper St. Croix Valley Conference	1936	1994
Upper Wisconsin Conference	1926	1939
Vacationland Conference	1966	1970
Valley 8 Conference	1999	2007
Valley-Ridge Athletic Conference	1934	1935
West Central Conference	1941	1952
West Central Conference	1959	1977
West Grant League	1930	1960
Western Wisconsin Conference	1931	1937
Wisconsin Little Ten Conference	1970	2017
Wisconsin River League	1928	1960
Wisconsin Seminary League	1963	1969
Wolf River Valley Conference	1932	1970
Wood County League	1925	1942

== Current single-sport conferences ==
Conference	Founded	Sport(s)
Across the Bay Conference	2020	Football (8-player)
Badgerland Hockey Conference	1984	Boys Hockey
Bay-Valley Lacrosse Association	2024	Boys Lacrosse, Girls Lacrosse
Big East-Eastern Wisconsin Conference	N/A	Boys Soccer
Classic 8-Southeast Conference	N/A	Gymnastics
CloverCroix Conference	N/A	Girls Golf
East Central Conference	2015	Football
East Valley Gymnastics Conference	N/A	Gymnastics
Eastern Shores Hockey Conference	2010	Girls Hockey
Eastern Suburban Conference	2020	Football
Greater Metro-Midwest Classic Conference	2025	Boys Lacrosse, Girls Lacrosse
North Central-8 Conference	2020	Football (8-player)
Northeast-8 Conference	2020	Football (8-player)
Northwoods Football Conference	2020	Football (11-player & 8-player)
Scenic Ridge & Rivers Conference	N/A	Wrestling
Southeast-8 Conference	2022	Football (8-player)
Western Wisconsin Hockey Conference	2025	Boys Hockey

== Former single-sport conferences ==
Conference	Founded	Disbanded	Sport(s)
856 Conference	1953	1956	Football (8-player)
Chequamegon Forest Football Conference	1960	1968	Football (8-player)
Chippewa-Black River Valley Conference	1929	1944	Football
Cloverwood Conference	2008	2019	Football
Independent High School Hockey League	1990	1999	Boys Hockey
Lower Fox Conference	1933	1936	Football
Mid-Western Wisconsin Conference	2021	2025	Girls Soccer
MONLPC Football Conference	2017	2021	Football (11-player & 8-player)
North Central Hockey Conference	1973	1997	Boys Hockey
Northwest Central Hockey League	1991	2010	Boys Hockey
Northwest Football League	1994	1995	Football
Northwest Hockey Conference	1976	1989	Boys Hockey
Olympian-Packerland Conference	2007	2014	Football
Southern Dairyland Conference	1959	1962	Football
Suburban Classic Hockey Conference	1995	2000	Boys Hockey
Suburban Six-Man Football League	1939	1957	Football (6-player & 8-player)
Top of Wisconsin Conference	1969	1982	Football
Tri-County Football Conference	1934	1944	Football
Tri-Valley Conference	1953	1958	Football
Valley Football Association	2011	2023	Football
Wisconsin Christian Football Conference	1997	1998	Football
Wisconsin Independent Football Association	1995	1998	Football
