= Northeast 8-Player Football Conference =

Wisconsin high school football conference

The Northeast 8-Player Football Conference is a high school football conference with members located in northeastern Wisconsin. It was formed in 2022 as the Northern Border Conference and is affiliated with the Wisconsin Interscholastic Athletic Association.

== History ==
The Northern Border Conference was founded in 2022 as part of a comprehensive realignment package spearheaded by the WIAA and the Wisconsin Football Coaches Association. Its original roster consisted of six programs who were previously part of the MONLPC Football Conference's eight-player division (Elcho/White Lake, Florence, Three Lakes/Phelps and Wabeno/Laona) and the Northwoods Football Conference (Niagara and Pembine/Goodman). Niagara had previously partnered with Pembine and Goodman in the Northern Elite football co-operative, sponsoring eleven-player football until the 2021 season. For the 2024-2025 competition cycle, the conference expanded to seven schools with the addition of Wausaukee (formerly of the Across the Bay Conference). Faith Christian Academy in Wausau was another planned addition to the conference but disbanded their football program before ever playing a game. The conference's current moniker was also adopted as part of the realignment.

The 2026-2027 competition cycle will see three schools leaving the Northeast 8-Player Football Conference: Elcho/White Lake, Three Lakes/Phelps and Wabeno/Laona. All of the exiting members will be joining the Northwoods Football Conference's eight-player division. The four exiting schools will be replaced by three former members of the Across the Bay Conference (Gillett, Lena/St. Thomas Aquinas and Suring), who will also become crossover scheduling partners with the conference.

== List of conference members ==
=== Current members ===
| School | Location | Affiliation | Enrollment | Mascot | Colors | Joined | Primary Conference |
|---|---|---|---|---|---|---|---|
| Florence | Florence, WI | Public | 121 | Bobcats | | 2022 | Northern Lakes |
| Gillett | Gillett, WI | Public | 145 | Tigers | | 2026 | Marinette & Oconto |
| Lena/ St. Thomas Aquinas | Lena, WI | Public, Private (Catholic) | 163 | Titans | | 2026 | Marinette & Oconto |
| Niagara | Niagara, WI | Public | 116 | Badgers | | 2022 | Marinette & Oconto |
| Pembine/ Goodman | Pembine, WI | Public | 73 | Patriots | | 2022 | Northern Lakes |
| Suring | Suring, WI | Public | 103 | Eagles | | 2026 | Marinette & Oconto |
| Wausaukee | Wausaukee, WI | Public | 114 | Rangers | | 2024 | Marinette & Oconto |

=== Former members ===
| School | Location | Affiliation | Mascot | Colors | Seasons | Primary Conference |
|---|---|---|---|---|---|---|
| Elcho/ White Lake | Elcho, WI | Public | Wolverines | | 2022-2025 | Northern Lakes |
| Three Lakes/ Phelps | Three Lakes, WI | Public | Bluejays | | 2022-2025 | Northern Lakes |
| Wabeno/ Laona | Wabeno, WI | Public | Rebels | | 2022-2025 | Northern Lakes |

== List of state champions ==
| School | Year |
|---|---|
| Florence | 2023 |

== List of conference champions ==
| School | Quantity | Years |
|---|---|---|
| Florence | 2 | 2022, 2023 |
| Suring | 1 | 2026 |
| Wabeno/ Laona | 1 | 2025 |
| Wausaukee | 1 | 2024 |
| Elcho/ White Lake | 0 | |
| Gillett | 0 | |
| Lena/ St. Thomas Aquinas | 0 | |
| Niagara | 0 | |
| Pembine/ Goodman | 0 | |
| Three Lakes/ Phelps | 0 | |
