= MONLPC Football Conference =

Wisconsin high school football conference (2017-2021)

The Marinette & Oconto-Northern Lakes-Packerland Conference, more commonly referred to as the MONLPC, is a former high school football conference comprising small schools in northeastern Wisconsin. Founded in 2017 and dissolved after the 2021 football season, its member schools were affiliated with the Wisconsin Interscholastic Athletic Association.

== History ==
The MONLPC Football Conference was formed in 2017 by members of three conferences in northeastern Wisconsin: the Marinette & Oconto, Northern Lakes and Packerland. It was created in reaction to the increasing number of schools in the region that were transitioning to eight-player football and featured an eight-player division in addition to large-school and small-school divisions for eleven-player football:

MONLPC Large	MONLPC Small	MONLPC-8
Algoma	Crandon	Bowler/Gresham
Coleman	Crivitz	Gibraltar
Kewaunee	Elcho/White Lake	Gillett
Oconto	Florence	Lena/St. Thomas Aquinas
Peshtigo	Northern Elite	Menominee Indian
Southern Door	Suring	NEW Lutheran
Sturgeon Bay	Three Lakes/Phelps	Oneida Nation
	Wabeno/Laona	Sevastopol
		Wausaukee

Even after the conference's formation, the influx of schools moving to eight-player football continued to drive the MONLPC's realignment. Florence was the first member to do so after the 2017 season, followed by five more programs after the 2018 season (Algoma, Elcho/White Lake, Suring, Three Lakes/Phelps and Wabeno/Laona). This allowed the Bowler/Gresham and Menominee Indian programs to join their primary home, the Central Wisconsin Conference, when they adopted an eight-player division in 2019. Coleman was shifted over to the MONLPC's small schools division in 2019, which would turn out to be the last for the two eleven-player divisions after they were realigned out of existence. This came after the WIAA and the Wisconsin Football Coaches Association unveiled a comprehensive realignment plan for Wisconsin's high school football conferences to be refreshed every two years. The nine displaced schools either joined a newly reconstituted Packerland Conference (Kewaunee, Oconto, Peshtigo, Southern Door and Sturgeon Bay) or the new Northwoods Football Conference (Coleman, Crandon, Crivitz and Northern Elite). Another change brought by realignment was the MONLPC's change to a twelve-member, two-division conference sponsoring eight-player football only:

MONLPC East	MONLPC West
Algoma	Elcho/White Lake
Gibraltar	Florence
Gillett	Suring
Lena/St. Thomas Aquinas	Three Lakes/Phelps
NEW Lutheran/Oneida	Wabeno/Laona
Sevastopol	Wausaukee

This alignment would last until the 2022-2023 competition cycle, when the eight-player divisions of the MONLPC were shuttered, just as their eleven-player counterparts were two years earlier. Eight programs (Algoma, Gibraltar, Gillett, Lena/St. Thomas Aquinas, NEW Lutheran/Oneida, Sevastopol, Suring and Wausaukee) formed the new Across the Bay Conference, while the other four (Elcho/White Lake, Florence, Three Lakes/Phelps and Wabeno/Laona constituted two thirds of the new Northern Border Conference, along with Niagara and Goodman/Pembine after the breakup of the Northern Elite football cooperative.

== Conference membership history ==
=== 11-player ===
School	Location	Affiliation	Mascot	Colors	Seasons	Primary Conference
Algoma	Algoma, WI	Public	Wolves		2017–2018	Packerland
Coleman	Coleman, WI	Public	Cougars		2017–2019	Marinette & Oconto
Crandon	Crandon, WI	Public	Cardinals		2017–2019	Northern Lakes
Crivitz	Crivitz, WI	Public	Wolverines		2017–2019	Marinette & Oconto
Elcho/ White Lake	Elcho, WI	Public	Wolverines		2017–2018	Northern Lakes
Florence	Florence, WI	Public	Bobcats		2017	Northern Lakes
Kewaunee	Kewaunee, WI	Public	Storm		2017–2019	Packerland
Northern Elite	Niagara, WI	Public	Predators		2017–2019	Marinette & Oconto, Northern Lakes
Oconto	Oconto, WI	Public	Blue Devils		2017–2019	Packerland
Peshtigo	Peshtigo, WI	Public	Bulldogs		2017–2019	Packerland
Southern Door	Brussels, WI	Public	Eagles		2017–2019	Packerland
Sturgeon Bay	Sturgeon Bay, WI	Public	Clippers		2017–2019	Packerland
Suring	Suring, WI	Public	Eagles		2017–2018	Marinette & Oconto
Three Lakes/ Phelps	Three Lakes, WI	Public	Bluejays		2017–2018	Northern Lakes
Wabeno/ Laona	Wabeno, WI	Public	Rebels		2017–2018	Northern Lakes

=== 8-player ===
School	Location	Affiliation	Mascot	Colors	Seasons	Primary Conference
Bowler/ Gresham	Bowler, WI	Public	Cats		2017–2018	Central Wisconsin
Gibraltar	Fish Creek, WI	Public	Vikings		2017–2021	Packerland
Gillett	Gillett, WI	Public	Tigers		2017–2021	Marinette & Oconto
Lena/ St. Thomas Aquinas	Lena, WI	Public, Private (Catholic)	Titans		2017–2021	Marinette & Oconto
Menominee Indian	Keshena, WI	Federal (Tribal)	Eagles		2017–2018	Central Wisconsin
NEW Lutheran	Green Bay, WI	Private (Lutheran, WELS)	Blazers		2017–2018	Packerland
Oneida Nation	Oneida, WI	Federal (Tribal)	Thunderhawks		2017–2018	Marinette & Oconto
Sevastopol	Sturgeon Bay, WI	Public	Pioneers		2017–2021	Packerland
Wausaukee	Wausaukee, WI	Public	Rangers		2017–2021	Marinette & Oconto
Florence	Florence, WI	Public	Bobcats		2019–2021	Marinette & Oconto
NEW Lutheran/ Oneida Nation	Green Bay, WI	Private (WELS), Federal (Tribal)	Blazers		2019–2021	Packerland, Marinette & Oconto
Suring	Suring, WI	Public	Eagles		2019–2021	Marinette & Oconto
Wabeno/ Laona	Wabeno, WI	Public	Rebels		2019–2021	Marinette & Oconto
Algoma	Algoma, WI	Public	Wolves		2020–2021	Packerland
Elcho/ White Lake	Elcho, WI	Public	Wolverines		2020–2021	Northern Lakes
Three Lakes/ Phelps	Three Lakes, WI	Public	Bluejays		2020–2021	Northern Lakes

== Membership timeline ==
=== 11-player ===
MONLPC Large MONLPC Small

=== 8-player ===
MONLPC East MONLPC West

== List of state champions ==
8-Player Football
School	Year
Sevastopol	2018

== List of conference champions ==
=== 11-player ===
School	Quantity	Years
Kewaunee	2	2018, 2019
Coleman	1	2019
Crandon	1	2017
Crivitz	1	2018
Southern Door	1	2017
Algoma	0	
Elcho/ White Lake	0	
Florence	0	
Northern Elite	0	
Oconto	0	
Peshtigo	0	
Sturgeon Bay	0	
Suring	0	
Three Lakes/ Phelps	0	
Wabeno/ Laona	0	

=== 8-player ===
School	Quantity	Years
Lena/ St. Thomas Aquinas	2	2020, 2021
Sevastopol	2	2017, 2018
Wabeno/ Laona	2	2020, 2021
Gibraltar	1	2019
Suring	1	2019
Algoma	0	
Bowler/ Gresham	0	
Elcho/ White Lake	0	
Florence	0	
Gillett	0	
Menominee Nation	0	
N.E.W. Lutheran	0	
N.E.W. Lutheran/ Oneida Nation	0	
Oneida Nation	0	
Three Lakes/ Phelps	0	
Wausaukee	0	
