= Northwoods Football Conference =

Wisconsin high school football conference

The Northwoods Football Conference is a high school football conference located in northeastern Wisconsin. Consisting of eleven-player and eight-player divisions, the conference was formed in 2020 and is affiliated with the Wisconsin Interscholastic Athletic Association.

== History ==
The Northwoods Football Conference was formed as an eleven-player football conference for the 2020 season after a sweeping realignment for Wisconsin high school football was unveiled by the WIAA and the Wisconsin Football Coaches Association. Four schools were former members of the MONLPC's small schools division (Coleman, Crandon, Crivitz and the Northern Elite cooperative), and one each came from the Central Wisconsin (Menominee Indian), Marawood (Tomahawk) and North Eastern (Oconto Falls) Conferences. The eighth original member, Northland Pines, competed as an independent prior to the creation of the NFC. Under the WIAA/WFCA plan, football conferences in both eleven-player and eight-player divisions went through realignment every two years. For the 2022-2023 realignment cycle, the Northwoods Football Conference lost the Northern Elite football cooperative after the three participating schools (Niagara and Goodman/Pembine) dissolved their partnership and switched to eight-player football. They were replaced by Clintonville, formerly a member of the MONLPC East division. In 2024, Manawa and Shiocton of the Central Wisconsin Conference joined the Northwoods Football League, replacing outgoing members Tomahawk and Menominee Indian. Tomahawk joined their primary home for competition in the Great Northern Conference, and Menominee Indian joined the Central Wisconsin Conference's eight-player football division after transitioning away from eleven-player football. Oconto Falls will be leaving the NFC for the 2026-2027 competition cycle to join the Packerland Conference for football, and the conference will be entering into a scheduling crossover partnership with the Central Wisconsin Conference's large school division.

=== 8-player football ===
In 2024, the Northwoods Football Conference began sponsorship of eight-player football with fourteen schools spread out over two divisions. Nine members were displaced from conferences that had ended football sponsorship: seven from the Lakeland Conference (Chequamegon/Butternut/Mercer, Mellen, Northwood/Solon Springs, Phillips, Shell Lake, Washburn and Winter/Birchwood) and two from the CWC (Athens and Bruce). The other five schools (Flambeau, Hurley, Prentice, Rib Lake and South Shore) were all new to eight-player football after having played eleven-player football either as cooperative or stand-alone programs. Members were subdivided into two divisions with one mandatory crossover conference game for each member:

| Northwoods East | Northwoods West |
|---|---|
| Athens | Bruce |
| Chequamegon/Butternut/Mercer | Mellen |
| Flambeau | Northwood/Solon Springs |
| Hurley | Shell Lake |
| Phillips | South Shore |
| Prentice | Washburn |
| Rib Lake | Winter/Birchwood |

For the 2026-2027 realignment cycle, Chequamegon will be playing as a stand-alone program, with their two former cooperative partners (Butternut and Mercer) joining Mellen in a new cooperative. Athens is also leaving to join the North Central Conference as a football member. The conference will also be adding three cooperative programs (Elcho/White Lake, Three Lakes/Phelps and Wabeno/Laona) from the Northeast Football Conference.

== List of conference members ==
=== 11-player football ===
==== Current members ====
| School | Location | Affiliation | Enrollment | Mascot | Colors | Joined | Primary Conference |
|---|---|---|---|---|---|---|---|
| Clintonville | Clintonville, WI | Public | 387 | Truckers | | 2022 | North Eastern |
| Coleman | Coleman, WI | Public | 206 | Cougars | | 2020 | Marinette & Oconto |
| Crandon | Crandon, WI | Public | 226 | Cardinals | | 2020 | Northern Lakes |
| Crivitz | Crivitz, WI | Public | 220 | Wolverines | | 2020 | Marinette & Oconto |
| Manawa | Manawa, WI | Public | 190 | Wolves | | 2024 | Central Wisconsin |
| Northland Pines | Eagle River, WI | Public | 404 | Eagles | | 2020 | Great Northern |
| Shicoton | Shiocton, WI | Public | 208 | Chiefs | | 2024 | Central Wisconsin |

==== Former members ====
| School | Location | Affiliation | Mascot | Colors | Seasons | Primary Conference |
|---|---|---|---|---|---|---|
| Menominee Indian | Keshena, WI | Federal (Tribal) | Eagles | | 2020–2023 | Central Wisconsin |
| Northern Elite | Niagara, WI | Public | Predators | | 2020–2021 | Marinette & Oconto |
| Oconto Falls | Oconto Falls, WI | Public | Panthers | | 2020-2025 | North Eastern |
| Tomahawk | Tomahawk, WI | Public | Hatchets | | 2020–2023 | Great Northern |

=== 8-player football ===
==== Current members ====
| School | Location | Affiliation | Enrollment | Mascot | Colors | Joined | Primary Conference |
|---|---|---|---|---|---|---|---|
| Bruce | Bruce, WI | Public | 104 | Red Raiders | | 2024 | Lakeland |
| Chequamegon | Park Falls, WI | Public | 182 | Screaming Eagles | | 2026 | Marawood |
| Elcho/ White Lake | Elcho, WI | Publc | 106 | Wolverines | | 2026 | Northern Lakes, Central Wisconsin |
| Flambeau | Tony, WI | Public | 130 | Falcons | | 2024 | Lakeland |
| Hurley | Hurley, WI | Public | 184 | Northstars | | 2024 | Northern Lights |
| Mellen/ Butternut/ Mercer | Mellen, WI | Public | 149 | Granite Diggers | | 2026 | Northern Lights |
| Northwood/ Solon Springs | Minong, WI | Public | 194 | Evergreens | | 2024 | Lakeland, Northern Lights |
| Phillips | Phillips, WI | Public | 189 | Loggers | | 2024 | Marawood |
| Prentice | Prentice, WI | Public | 109 | Buccaneers | | 2024 | Marawood |
| Rib Lake | Rib Lake, WI | Public | 154 | Redmen | | 2024 | Marawood |
| Shell Lake | Shell Lake, WI | Public | 193 | Lakers | | 2024 | Lakeland |
| South Shore | Port Wing, WI | Public | 61 | Cardinals | | 2024 | Northern Lights |
| Three Lakes/ Phelps | Three Lakes, WI | Public | 190 | Bluejays | | 2026 | Northern Lakes |
| Wabeno/ Laona | Wabeno, WI | Public | 176 | Rebels | | 2026 | Northern Lakes |
| Washburn | Washburn, WI | Public | 186 | Castle Guards | | 2024 | Northern Lights |
| Winter/ Birchwood | Winter, WI | Public | 134 | WarCats | | 2024 | Lakeland |

==== Former members ====
| School | Location | Affiliation | Mascot | Colors | Seasons | Primary Conference |
|---|---|---|---|---|---|---|
| Athens | Athens, WI | Public | Bluejays | | 2024-2025 | Marawood |
| Chequamegon/ Butternut/ Mercer | Park Falls, WI | Public | Screaming Eagles | | 2024-2025 | Marawood |
| Mellen | Mellen, WI | Public | Granite Diggers | | 2024-2025 | Northern Lights |

== Membership timeline ==
=== 8-player ===
Northwoods East Northwoods West

== List of conference champions ==
=== 11-player ===
| School | Quantity | Years |
|---|---|---|
| Coleman | 4 | 2021, 2022, 2024, 2026 |
| Oconto Falls | 3 | 2020, 2023, 2025 |
| Shiocton | 1 | 2026 |
| Clintonville | 0 | |
| Crandon | 0 | |
| Crivitz | 0 | |
| Manawa | 0 | |
| Menominee Indian | 0 | |
| Northern Elite | 0 | |
| Northland Pines | 0 | |
| Tomahawk | 0 | |

=== 8-player ===
| School | Quantity | Years |
|---|---|---|
| Shell Lake | 2 | 2025, 2026 |
| Flambeau | 1 | 2025 |
| Hurley | 1 | 2026 |
| Northwood/ Solon Springs | 1 | 2024 |
| Phillips | 1 | 2024 |
| Athens | 0 | |
| Bruce | 0 | |
| Chequamegon | 0 | |
| Chequamegon/ Butternut/ Mercer | 0 | |
| Elcho/ White Lake | 0 | |
| Mellen | 0 | |
| Mellen/ Butternut/ Mercer | 0 | |
| Prentice | 0 | |
| Rib Lake | 0 | |
| South Shore | 0 | |
| Three Lakes/ Phelps | 0 | |
| Wabeno/ Laona | 0 | |
| Washburn | 0 | |
| Winter/ Birchwood | 0 | |
