= Nicolet Conference =

Wisconsin high school athletic conference (1938-1942)

The Nicolet Conference is a former high school athletic conference consisting of small schools in the Menominee Valley of northeastern Wisconsin. It was operational from 1938 to 1942, and its members belonged to the Wisconsin Interscholastic Athletic Association.

== History ==
Location of Nicolet Conference Members

The Nicolet Conference was founded in 1938 by four small schools in Marinette County and Oconto County in northeastern Wisconsin: Amberg, Mountain, Pembine and Wausaukee. The conference was named after Jean Nicolet, the French fur trader who explored Wisconsin's waterways in pre-colonial North America. Competition lasted for only four seasons before World War II interrupted and the conference was disbanded in 1942. Three years later, three former members of the Nicolet Conference (Amberg, Pembine and Wausaukee) would join with Crivitz of the Marinette & Oconto Conference to form the Granite Valley Conference.

== Conference membership history ==
School	Location	Affiliation	Mascot	Colors	Joined	Left	Conference Joined	Current Conference
Amberg	Amberg, WI	Public	Ravens		1938	1942	Independent	Closed in 1960 (merged into Wausaukee)
Mountain	Mountain, WI	Public	Mountaineers		1938	1942	Independent	Closed in 1948 (merged into Suring)
Pembine	Pembine, WI	Public	Panthers		1938	1942	Independent	Northern Lakes (coop with Goodman)
Wausaukee	Wausaukee, WI	Public	Rangers		1938	1942	Independent	Marinette & Oconto

== List of conference champions ==
=== Boys Basketball ===
School	Quantity	Years
Mountain	3	1939, 1940, 1942
Wausaukee	1	1941
Amberg	0	
Pembine	0	
