= Marinette & Oconto Conference =

Wisconsin high school athletic conference

The Marinette & Oconto Conference is a high school athletic conference in northeastern Wisconsin. Founded in 1927, the conference and its members are affiliated with the Wisconsin Interscholastic Athletic Association.

== History ==
=== 1927-1951 ===
Location of Original Marinette & Oconto Conference Members

The Marinette & Oconto Conference was formed in 1927 by seven small high schools in Marinette and Oconto Counties in northeastern Wisconsin: Coleman, Crivitz, Lena, Marinette Normal, Our Lady of Lourdes, Peshtigo and Wausaukee. In 1929, the M&O lost Marinette Normal and Our Lady of Lourdes, with Niagara joining to bring the conference to six members. Peshtigo left the loop in 1931, with Gillett moving over from the Northeastern Wisconsin Conference in 1932 to take their place. The membership roster for the Marinette & Oconto Conference increased to nine in 1933 when Florence, Mountain and Suring entered the league. Peshtigo would return to the M&O in 1934, and Florence and Niagara left a year later, bringing the conference to eight schools. Football was first sponsored by the Marinette & Oconto Conference in 1937, with five schools (Coleman, Crivitz, Gillett, Lena and Peshtigo) participating in the six-player variant. In 1938, Mountain and Wausaukee exited the conference, and along with Amberg and Pembine they formed the new Nicolet Conference. Bonduel spent a short stint in the conference during World War II, joining in 1941 and leaving two years later. The M&O transitioned to sponsoring eight-player football in 1944, and two years later the conference unanimously voted to adopt eleven-player football for the 1946 season. After numerous changes in the conference's first two decades, the circuit entered a period of stability that would last until the 1950s.

=== 1951-1999 ===
In 1951, the four-member Granite Valley Conference merged with the six members of the Marinette & Oconto Conference: Amberg, Crivitz, Pembine and Wausaukee. Crivitz was previously a member of both conferences, and Wausaukee reentered the M&O after a thirteen-year absence. With the addition of Goodman, the Marinette & Oconto Conference became a ten-member group, but this arrangement would end up being short-lived. In 1954, Amberg, Goodman, Pembine and Wausaukee split off to reform the Granite Valley Conference, leaving the conference with six member schools. Wausaukee rejoined the Marinette & Oconto Conference for a third time in 1961 after displacement by the Granite Valley's dissolution in 1960. In 1968, Niagara left the Menominee Range Conference in the upper peninsula of Michigan to rejoin as the M&O's eighth member. The Marinette & Oconto Conference entered a three-decade period of stability after Niagara's return.

=== 1999-present ===
In 1999, Marinette Central Catholic (formerly Our Lady of Lourdes) came back to the Marinette & Oconto Conference after the dissolution of the Fox Valley Christian Conference, a result of the merger between the Wisconsin Independent Schools Athletic Association and the WIAA that was finalized in 2000. The school became St. Thomas Aquinas Academy in 2005 after changing its enrollment model from high school to K-12. The Oneida Nation High School joined the M&O in 2015, its first conference membership in their twenty-year history. With Peshtigo's exit in 2017 to join the Packerland Conference, the Marinette & Oconto Conference became the nine-member league that currently exists. Football sponsorship was ended that season as well, as the M&O partnered with the Northern Lakes and Packerland Conferences to form the MONLPC Football Conference.

== List of conference members ==
=== Current members ===
School	Location	Affiliation	Enrollment	Mascot	Colors	Joined
Coleman	Coleman, WI	Public	206	Cougars		1927
Crivitz	Crivitz, WI	Public	220	Wolverines		1927
Gillett	Gillett, WI	Public	145	Tigers		1932
Lena	Lena, WI	Public	121	Wildcats		1927
Niagara	Niagara, WI	Public	116	Badgers		1929, 1968
Oneida Nation	Onʌyoteˀa·ká, WI	Federal (Tribal)	156	Thunderhawks		2015
St. Thomas Aquinas	Marinette, WI	Private (Catholic)	42	Cavaliers		1927, 1999
Suring	Suring, WI	Public	103	Eagles		1933
Wausaukee	Wausaukee, WI	Public	114	Rangers		1927, 1951, 1961

=== Former members ===
School	Location	Affiliation	Mascot	Colors	Joined	Left	Conference Joined	Current Conference
Amberg	Amberg, WI	Public	Ravens		1951	1954	Granite Valley	Closed in 1960 (consolidated into Wausaukee)
Bonduel	Bonduel, WI	Public	Bears		1941	1943	Independent	Central Wisconsin
Florence	Florence, WI	Public	Bobcats		1933	1935	Little Seven (MHSAA)	Northern Lakes
Goodman	Goodman, WI	Public	Falcons		1951	1954	Granite Valley	Northern Lakes (co-op with Pembine)
Marinette Normal	Marinette, WI	Public	Unknown	Unknown	1927	1929	Closed in 1965	
Mountain	Mountain, WI	Public	Mountaineers		1933	1938	Nicolet	Closed in 1948 (consolidated into Suring)
Pembine	Pembine, WI	Public	Panthers		1951	1954	Granite Valley	Northern Lakes (co-op with Goodman)
Peshtigo	Peshtigo, WI	Public	Bulldogs		1927, 1934	1931, 2017	Packerland	

=== Former football-only members ===
School	Location	Affiliation	Mascot	Colors	Seasons	Primary Conference
Goodman	Goodman, WI	Public	Falcons		1950, 1954	Granite Valley
Lena/ St. Thomas Aquinas	Lena, WI	Public, Private (Catholic)	Titans		2003-2013	Marinette & Oconto
Niagara	Niagara, WI	Public	Badgers		1966-1967	Menominee Range (MHSAA)
Pembine	Pembine, WI	Public	Panthers		1950, 1954	Granite Valley
Wausaukee	Wausaukee, WI	Public	Rangers		1947-1948, 1950	Granite Valley

== Membership timeline ==
=== Full members ===
Northern Division Southern Division

== Membership map ==
Marinette & Oconto Conference
Location of Marinette & Oconto Conference full members:
1 Coleman
2 Crivitz
3 Gillett
4 Lena
5 Niagara
6 Oneida Nation
7 St. Thomas Aquinas
8 Suring
9 Wausaukee

== Sanctioned sports ==
	Baseball	Boys Basketball	Girls Basketball	Boys Cross Country	Girls Cross Country	Boys Golf	Softball	Boys Track & Field	Girls Track & Field	Girls Volleyball	Boys Wrestling	Girls Wrestling
Coleman	●	●	●	●	●	●	●	●	●	●	●	●
Crivitz	●	●	●	●	●	●	●	●	●	●	● (Note: Co-operative with Wausaukee)	●
Gillett	● (Note: Co-operative with Suring)	●	●	●	●	●	●	●	●	●		
Lena	●	●	●	● (Note: Co-operative with St. Thomas Aquinas)	●	●	●	●	●	●	●	●
Niagara	●	●	●			●	●			●		
Oneida Nation		●	●	●	●	●		●	●	●	●	
St. Thomas Aquinas	●	●	●			●				●		
Suring		●	●	●	●	●		●	●	●	● (Note: Co-operative with Gillett)	●
Wausaukee	●	●	●	●	●	●	●			●		

== List of state champions ==
=== Fall sports ===
Football
School	Year	Division
Peshtigo	1983	Division 5

Girls Volleyball
School	Year	Division
Niagara	1991	Division 4

=== Winter sports ===
Boys Basketball
School	Year	Division
Niagara	1979	Class C
Wausaukee	1993	Division 4

Girls Basketball
School	Year	Division
Lena	1980	Class C

Boys Wrestling
School	Year	Division
Coleman	1960	Single Division
Coleman	1962	Single Division
Coleman	1963	Single Division
Coleman	1964	Single Division
Coleman	1966	Single Division
Coleman	2000	Division 3
Coleman	2010	Division 3
Coleman	2011	Division 3
Coleman	2012	Division 3
Coleman	2014	Division 3
Coleman	2020	Division 3

=== Spring sports ===
Baseball
School	Year	Division
Coleman	2012	Division 4

Softball
School	Year	Division
Wausaukee	1996	Division 3
Peshtigo	2010	Division 3

Boys Track & Field
School	Year	Division
Peshtigo	1957	Class C
Lena	1960	Class C
Peshtigo	1966	Class C
Peshtigo	1971	Class C
Coleman	2016	Division 3
Coleman	2017	Division 3

== List of conference champions ==
=== Boys Basketball ===
School	Quantity	Years
Crivitz	28	1928, 1931, 1932, 1936, 1952, 1953, 1959, 1961, 1962, 1971, 1972, 1973, 1974, 1975, 1976, 1985, 1988, 1993, 1994, 2009, 2018, 2019, 2020, 2022, 2023, 2024, 2025, 2026
Peshtigo	25	1937, 1938, 1940, 1941, 1946, 1950, 1951, 1956, 1957, 1958, 1971, 1981, 1982, 1983, 1998, 2000, 2004, 2005, 2006, 2011, 2012, 2013, 2014, 2016, 2017
Wausaukee	18	1964, 1966, 1967, 1968, 1970, 1978, 1984, 1986, 1989, 1990, 1991, 1992, 1995, 1996, 1997, 2000, 2002, 2015
Lena	11	1929, 1939, 1944, 1945, 1949, 1950, 1952, 1953, 1955, 1963, 2005
Gillett	10	1935, 1942, 1947, 1948, 1950, 1952, 1953, 1954, 1965, 1976
Niagara	10	1929, 1930, 1933, 1934, 1935, 1969, 1977, 1979, 1980, 1987
Suring	9	1999, 2000, 2001, 2003, 2006, 2007, 2008, 2010, 2018
Coleman	7	1957, 1960, 1987, 2018, 2020, 2021, 2022
Amberg	0	
Bonduel	0	
Florence	0	
Goodman	0	
Marinette Normal	0	
Mountain	0	
Oneida Nation	0	
Pembine	0	
St. Thomas Aquinas	0	

=== Girls Basketball ===
School	Quantity	Years
Peshtigo	11	1977, 1978, 1981, 1982, 1997, 2010, 2013, 2014, 2015, 2016, 2017
Coleman	9	1991, 1995, 1996, 2012, 2013, 2014, 2021, 2022, 2023
Crivitz	10	1983, 1985, 1986, 1988, 1989, 1990, 1992, 2018, 2019, 2026
Lena	9	1975, 1976, 1977, 1979, 1980, 1998, 2003, 2024, 2025
Gillett	6	2002, 2004, 2005, 2006, 2010, 2011
Niagara	6	1984, 1993, 1994, 1999, 2007, 2008
Wausaukee	5	1987, 2003, 2008, 2009, 2019
Oneida Nation	2	2019, 2020
St. Thomas Aquinas	2	2000, 2001
Suring	1	2023

=== Football ===
School	Quantity	Years
Peshtigo	34	1938, 1939, 1953, 1954, 1955, 1956, 1957, 1958, 1959, 1960, 1962, 1964, 1965, 1969, 1972, 1974, 1976, 1978, 1982, 1983, 1984, 1987, 1988, 1990, 1993, 1995, 1996, 1998, 1999, 2000, 2005, 2006, 2009, 2013
Coleman	22	1940, 1942, 1947, 1951, 1958, 1959, 1965, 1976, 1977, 1980, 1981, 1982, 1997, 2002, 2003, 2008, 2010, 2011, 2012, 2014, 2015, 2016
Crivitz	9	1958, 1961, 1985, 1986, 1989, 1992, 1993, 2002, 2007
Gillett	9	1937, 1941, 1948, 1949, 1952, 1963, 1971, 1979, 1993
Niagara	9	1968, 1971, 1973, 1974, 1975, 1976, 1994, 1995, 2004
Lena	6	1937, 1943, 1944, 1945, 1974, 1991
Suring	5	1966, 1967, 1970, 1978, 2005
Wausaukee	3	1978, 2001, 2002
Lena/ St. Thomas Aquinas	1	2005
Goodman	0	
Pembine	0	
Champions from 1946 and 1950 unknown
