= Northern Lakes Conference (Wisconsin) =

Wisconsin high school athletic conference

The Northern Lakes Conference is a high school athletic conference with its membership base in northern Wisconsin. It was founded in 1926 and all members belong to the Wisconsin Interscholastic Athletic Association.

== History ==
=== 1926–1937 ===
Location of Original Northern Lakes Conference Members

The Northern Lakes Conference was originally formed in 1926 as the Northeastern High School Athletic Conference, a basketball-only conference with ten members in northern Wisconsin: Argonne, Crandon, Eagle River, Elcho, Goodman, Hiles, Laona, Three Lakes, Wabeno and White Lake. Suring was added after the conference's first season of competition, and it was rechristened the Land O'Lakes Conference after the region of northern Wisconsin in which its members were located. Football was sponsored from the conference's inception, with five schools (Argonne, Crandon, Elcho, Goodman and Wabeno) forming the initial roster. Phelps joined the conference after the first season, and in 1929, Mountain entered the league as its thirteenth member. Minocqua became a member of the Land O' Lakes Conference in 1932, but membership stayed at thirteen schools due to Crandon's departure. That number was decreased to eleven the next year, as Mountain and Suring left to join the Marinette & Oconto Conference. Crandon reinstated full membership in the Land O'Lakes in 1934 to put the roster at twelve schools, and the conference subdivided into Northern and Southern Divisions:

Northern Division	Southern Division
Eagle River	Argonne
Elcho	Crandon
Hiles	Goodman
Minocqua	Laona
Phelps	Wabeno
Three Lakes	White Lake

=== 1937–1972 ===
In 1937, the Land O'Lakes Conference changed its name to the Northern Lakes Conference in order to avoid confusion with another conference of the same name. Membership stayed at twelve schools until the start of World War II, when both Argonne and Hiles closed, with students for both schools being redistricted to Crandon. After World War II, the Northern Lakes began sponsorship of six-player football, and three of the conference's smaller schools (Elcho, Phelps and Three Lakes) participated along with associate members Woodruff-Arbor Vitae. Their entry into the conference as full members in 1950 brought the membership roster to eleven schools. The conference's six-player football division was also ended that year, as all four participants transitioned to eleven-player football. In 1951, Goodman accepted an invitation to join the Marinette & Oconto Conference, and Elcho shifted to the Southern Division to create two five-member divisions:

Northern Division	Southern Division
Eagle River	Crandon
Minocqua	Elcho
Phelps	Laona
Three Lakes	Wabeno
Woodruff-Arbor Vitae	White Lake

Divisional play was ended in 1954, and in 1957, the number of schools in the Northern Lakes Conference decreased to eight as White Lake left for membership in the Wolf River Valley Conference and Lakeland Union High School was created from the consolidation of Minocqua and Woodruff-Arbor Vitae. Lakeland Union's tenure in the Northern Lakes Conference turned out to be short-lived, as they only spent one season in the conference before joining with larger schools in the Lumberjack Conference in 1958. Goodman rejoined the conference in 1960 after spending the previous few seasons as members of the disbanded Granite Valley Conference. In 1964, the Northern Lakes Conference added Florence as a new member, who joined after exiting the Big Six Conference in Michigan's upper peninsula.

=== 1972–present ===
In 1972, Pembine entered the Northern Lakes from the Michigan-based Skyline Conference and White Lake rejoined after displacement from the defunct Wolf River Valley Conference two years prior. Eagle River High School changed its name to Northland Pines High School in 1974 when they built a new facility to relieve overcrowding, and they would leave the conference two years later for membership in the newly expanded Lumberjack Conference. The Northern Lakes Conference remained a stable ten-school circuit for the next three decades before welcoming the Conserve School in Land o' Lakes into the fold in 2005. Their stay would be relatively short, as they left the conference in 2009. The Northern Lakes Conference would see four programs consolidate into two at the beginning of the 2010s, first with Goodman and Pembine in 2011 and then with Laona and Wabeno the next year. Sponsorship of football was ended after the 2016 season, and Northern Lakes joined with the Marinette & Oconto Conference and Packerland Conference to create the MONLPC Football Conference. White Lake left the conference for a second time to join the Central Wisconsin Conference in 2021, bringing the membership roster to its current total of nine schools, four of which are part of cooperative programs due to size.

== List of conference members ==
=== Current full members ===
School	Location	Affiliation	Enrollment	Mascot	Colors	Joined
Crandon	Crandon, WI	Public	226	Cardinals		1926, 1934
Elcho	Elcho, WI	Public	66	Hornets		1926
Florence	Florence, WI	Public	121	Bobcats		1964
Pembine/ Goodman	Goodman, WI/ Pembine, WI	Public	73	Patriots		2011
Phelps	Phelps, WI	Public	34	Fighting Knights		1928
Three Lakes	Three Lakes, WI	Public	156	Bluejays		1926
Wabeno/ Laona	Laona, WI/Wabeno, WI	Public	176	Rebels		2012

=== Current co-operative members ===
Team	Colors	Host School	Co-operative Members	Sport(s)
Northwoods Storm		Florence	Niagara	Cross Country, Track & Field, Wrestling

=== Former members ===
School	Location	Affiliation	Mascot	Colors	Joined	Left	Conference Joined	Current Conference
Argonne	Argonne, WI	Public	Wolverines		1926	1942	Closed in 1942 (consolidated into Crandon)	
Conserve School	Land o' Lakes, WI	Private (Nonsectarian)	Steelers		2005	2009	Independent	Closed in 2020
Goodman	Goodman, WI	Public	Falcons		1926, 1960	1951, 2011	Marinette & Oconto	Northern Lakes (coop with Pembine)
Hiles	Hiles, WI	Public	Purgolds		1926	1943	Closed in 1943 (consolidated into Crandon)	
Lakeland Union	Minocqua, WI	Public	Thunderbirds		1957	1958	Lumberjack	Great Northern
Laona	Laona, WI	Public	Fighting Kellys		1926	2012	Northern Lakes (coop with Wabeno)	
Minocqua	Minocqua, WI	Public	Islanders		1932	1957	Closed (merged into Lakeland Union)	
Mountain	Mountain, WI	Public	Mountaineers		1929	1933	Marinette & Oconto	Closed in 1948 (consolidated into Suring)
Northland Pines	Eagle River, WI	Public	Eagles		1926	1976	Lumberjack	Great Northern
Pembine	Pembine, WI	Public	Panthers		1972	2011	Northern Lakes (coop with Goodman)	
Suring	Suring, WI	Public	Eagles		1927	1933	Marinette & Oconto	
Wabeno	Wabeno, WI	Public	Logrollers		1926	2012	Northern Lakes (coop with Laona)	
White Lake	White Lake, WI	Public	Lakers		1926, 1972	1957, 2021	Independent, Central Wisconsin	Central Wisconsin
Woodruff-Arbor Vitae	Arbror Vitae, WI	Public	Muskies		1950	1957	Closed (merged into Lakeland Union)	

=== Former football-only members ===
==== 11-player ====
School	Location	Affiliation	Mascot	Colors	Seasons	Primary Conference
Crandon	Crandon, WI	Public	Cardinals		1932-1933	Independent
Elcho/ White Lake	Elcho, WI	Public	Wolverines		1996-2016	Northern Lakes
Florence	Florence, WI	Public	Bobcats		1963	Little Seven (MHSAA)
Pembine/ Goodman	Pembine, WI	Public	Patriots		1986, 1988-1991, 1994, 2004	Northern Lakes
Hurley	Hurley, WI	Public	Midgets		1992-1999	Indianhead
Marinette Catholic Central	Marinette, WI	Private (Catholic)	Cavaliers		1999-2002	Marinette & Oconto
Menominee Nation	Keshena, WI	Federal (Tribal)	Eagles		2005-2014	Central Wisconsin
Northern Elite (Note: Niagara/Goodman/Pembine cooperative)	Niagara, WI	Public	Predators		2005-2016	Marinette & Oconto, Northern Lakes
Three Lakes/ Phelps	Three Lakes, WI	Public	Bluejays		1998-2002, 2004	Northern Lakes
Wabeno/ Laona	Wabeno, WI	Public	Rebels		1988-2011	Northern Lakes
White Lake/ Menominee Indian	White Lake, WI	Public, Federal (Tribal)	Lakers		1992-1995	Northern Lakes, Central Wisconsin

==== 6-player ====
School	Location	Affiliation	Mascot	Colors	Seasons	Primary Conference
Woodruff-Arbor Vitae	Arbror Vitae, WI	Public	Muskies		1947-1949	Independent

== Membership timeline ==
=== Full members ===
Northern Division Southern Division

== Membership map ==
Northern Lakes Conference
Location of Northern Lakes Conference full members:
1 Crandon
2 Elcho
3 Florence
4 Goodman
5 Laona
6 Pembine
7 Phelps
8 Three Lakes
9 Wabeno

== Sponsored sports ==
	Baseball	Boys Basketball	Girls Basketball	Boys Cross Country	Girls Cross Country	Boys Golf	Softball	Boys Track & Field	Girls Track & Field	Girls Volleyball	Boys Wrestling	Girls Wrestling
Crandon	●	●	●	●	●	●	●	●	●	●	●	●
Elcho	●	●	●	●	●	●	●			●	●	●
Florence	●	●	●	● (Note: Northwoods Storm co-operative)	●	●	●	●	●	●	●	●
Pembine/Goodman	● (Note: Hosted by Pembine)	● (Note: Hosted by Goodman)	●	●	●	●	●			●		
Phelps		●								●		
Three Lakes	● (Note: Co-operative with Phelps)	●	●	●	●	●	●	●	●	●		
Wabeno/Laona	● (Note: Hosted by Laona)	● (Note: Hosted by Wabeno)	●	●	●	●	●	●	●	●	● (Note: Co-operative between Wabeno, Laona and Three Lakes)	●

== List of state champions ==
=== Fall sports ===
None

=== Winter sports ===
Boys Basketball
School	Year	Division
Florence	1989	Class C

=== Spring sports ===
Girls Track & Field
School	Year	Division
Florence	1996	Division 3

== List of conference champions ==
=== Boys Basketball ===
School	Quantity	Years
Three Lakes	21	1941, 1945, 1951, 1953, 1956, 1957, 1958, 1959, 1965, 1980, 1997, 1998, 2001, 2002, 2003, 2004, 2008, 2009, 2010, 2012, 2024
Crandon	19	1929, 1931, 1936, 1938, 1939, 1950, 1952, 1953, 1956, 1970, 1971, 1973, 1974, 1975, 2007, 2011, 2013, 2018, 2025
Wabeno	14	1947, 1954, 1960, 1962, 1963, 1965, 1967, 1968, 1969, 1972, 1976, 1979, 2005, 2006
Laona	10	1930, 1932, 1935, 1942, 1953, 1977, 1978, 1993, 1994, 1995
Phelps	10	1938, 1946, 1950, 1982, 1983, 1984, 1985, 1986, 2018, 2019
Florence	9	1987, 1988, 1989, 1991, 1992, 1996, 1999, 2000, 2023
White Lake	9	1937, 1940, 1941, 1945, 1946, 1947, 1948, 1952, 1983
Goodman	8	1945, 1947, 1949, 1961, 1964, 1981, 1994, 1996
(Eagle River); Northland Pines	8	1927, 1935, 1936, 1939, 1940, 1942, 1947, 1966
Wabeno/ Laona	8	2015, 2016, 2017, 2020, 2021, 2022, 2025, 2026
Minocqua	6	1935, 1937, 1938, 1948, 1949, 1955
Woodruff-Arbor Vitae	4	1952, 1953, 1954, 1957
Argonne	2	1928, 1940
Hiles	2	1933, 1934
Elcho	1	1990
Pembine/Goodman	1	2014
Conserve School	0	
Lakeland Union	0	
Mountain	0	
Pembine	0	
Suring	0	

=== Girls Basketball ===
School	Quantity	Years
Florence	22	1976, 1980, 1981, 1984, 1985, 1988, 1989, 1990, 1991, 1992, 1993, 1994, 1995, 1996, 1998, 2000, 2001, 2002, 2004, 2005, 2006, 2007
Crandon	19	1978, 1979, 1982, 1987, 2002, 2003, 2011, 2012, 2013, 2014, 2016, 2018, 2019, 2020, 2021, 2022, 2023, 2024, 2025
Wabeno	8	1982, 1983, 1987, 1988, 1990, 1992, 2009, 2010
Three Lakes	5	1984, 1986, 1997, 1999, 2008
Wabeno/ Laona	5	2015, 2016, 2022, 2023, 2026
Elcho	4	1976, 1983, 2017, 2018
Laona	3	1974, 1976, 1977
Goodman	1	2002
(Eagle River); Northland Pines	1	1975
Three Lakes/ Phelps	1	2022
Goodman/ Pembine	0	
Pembine	0	
Phelps	0	
White Lake	0	

=== Football ===
==== 11-player ====
School	Quantity	Years
Florence	23	1963, 1973, 1974, 1976, 1981, 1983, 1985, 1986, 1987, 1988, 1989, 1990, 1991, 1992, 1993, 1995, 1996, 1997, 1999, 2000, 2002, 2009, 2010
(Eagle River); Northland Pines	14	1937, 1938, 1939, 1940, 1941, 1946, 1951, 1953, 1954, 1958, 1959, 1964, 1965, 1969
Wabeno	12	1928, 1929, 1930, 1931, 1932, 1933, 1934, 1936, 1960, 1961, 1971, 1979
Elcho	10	1927, 1934, 1955, 1957, 1965, 1966, 1967, 1970, 1973, 1977
Northern Elite	9	2005, 2006, 2007, 2008, 2011, 2013, 2014, 2015, 2016
Crandon	8	1942, 1943, 1944, 1950, 1972, 1980, 1984, 2012
Wabeno/ Laona	7	1994, 1996, 2001, 2003, 2004, 2006, 2009
Goodman	5	1945, 1948, 1962, 1968, 1978
Minocqua	5	1935, 1947, 1949, 1954, 1956
Laona	4	1952, 1954, 1958, 1976
Hurley	3	1994, 1996, 1998
Three Lakes	3	1975, 1982, 1993
Argonne	0	
Elcho/ White Lake	0	
Lakeland Union	0	
Marinette Catholic Central	0	
Menominee Nation	0	
Pembine	0	
Pembine/ Goodman	0	
Phelps	0	
Three Lakes/ Phelps	0	
White Lake	0	
White Lake/ Menominee Nation	0	
Woodruff-Arbor Vitae	0	

==== 6-player ====
School	Quantity	Years
Woodruff-Arbor Vitae	2	1947, 1948
Phelps	1	1949
Elcho	0	
Three Lakes	0	
