= Goodman (CDP), Wisconsin =

Census-designated place in Wisconsin, United States

Goodman, Wisconsin
- Census-designated place
- Location within Wisconsin
- Coordinates: 45°37′53″N 88°21′12″W
- Country: United States
- State: Wisconsin
- County: Marinette

Area
  - Total: 1.698 sq mi (4.40 km^{2})
  - Land: 1.662 sq mi (4.30 km^{2})
  - Water: 0.036 sq mi (0.093 km^{2})
- Elevation: 1,391 ft (424 m)

Population (2020 census)
  - Total: 241
  - Density: 145/sq mi (56.0/km^{2})
- Time zone: UTC-6 (Central (CST))
  - Summer (DST): UTC-5 (CDT)
- ZIP code: 54125
- Area codes: 715 & 534
- GNIS feature ID: 1565631

Goodman is an unincorporated census-designated place located in the town of Goodman, Marinette County, Wisconsin, United States. Goodman is located on U.S. Route 8, 19.5 miles (31.4 km) west-southwest of Niagara. Goodman has a post office with ZIP code 54125. As of the 2020 census, its population is 241.

Historical population
Census	Pop.	Note	%±
2010	271		—
2020	241		−11.1%
U.S. Decennial Census
