= Mountain (CDP), Wisconsin =

Census-designated place in Wisconsin, United States

Mountain, Wisconsin
- Census-designated place
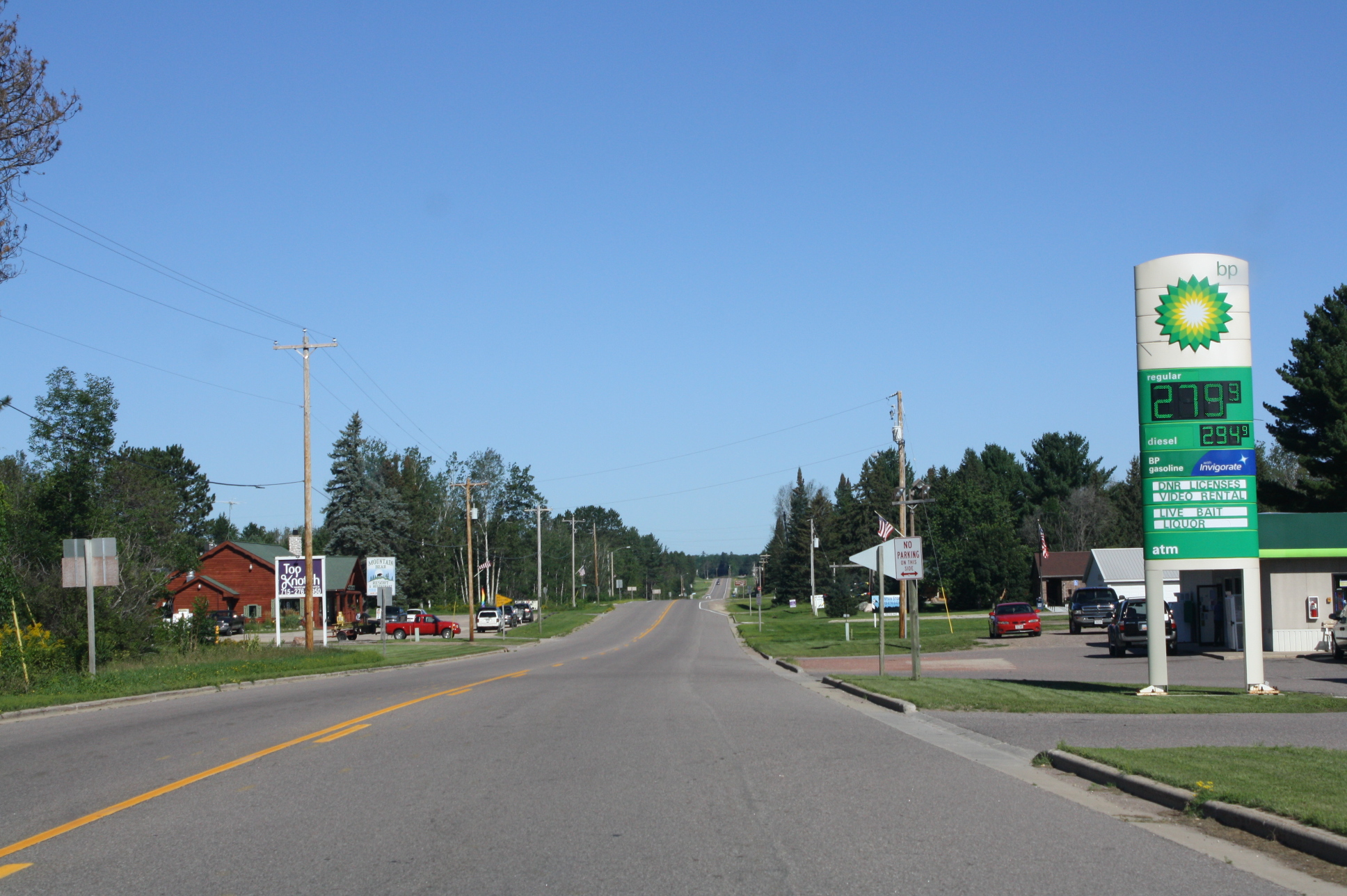
- Looking north in Mountain

- Location within Wisconsin
- Coordinates: 45°11′05″N 88°28′25″W
- Country: United States
- State: Wisconsin
- County: Oconto

Area
  - Total: 6.699 sq mi (17.35 km^{2})
  - Land: 6.699 sq mi (17.35 km^{2})
  - Water: 0 sq mi (0 km^{2})
- Elevation: 971 ft (296 m)

Population (2020)
  - Total: 289
  - Density: 43.1/sq mi (16.7/km^{2})
- Time zone: UTC-6 (Central (CST))
  - Summer (DST): UTC-5 (CDT)
- ZIP code: 54149
- Area codes: 715 & 534
- GNIS feature ID: 1579932

Mountain is an unincorporated community in Oconto County, Wisconsin, United States. The community is located at the intersection of Wisconsin Highway 32 and Wisconsin Highway 64, in the town of Mountain. It is located at latitude 45.185 and longitude -88.474 and elevation 971 feet (mean sea level). The postal code for Mountain is 54149. The post office in Mountain was established in 1889, and remains in operation today. As of the 2020 census, its population was 289, down from 363 at the 2010 census. For statistical purposes, the United States Census Bureau has defined Mountain as a census-designated place (CDP).

== Geography ==
Mountain has an area of 6.699 square miles (17.35 km^{2}), all land.

== History ==
A post office called Mountain has been in operation since 1889. Mountain was platted in 1896. The community was named from the hilly terrain in the area, which early drivers compared to climbing mountains.

== Images ==
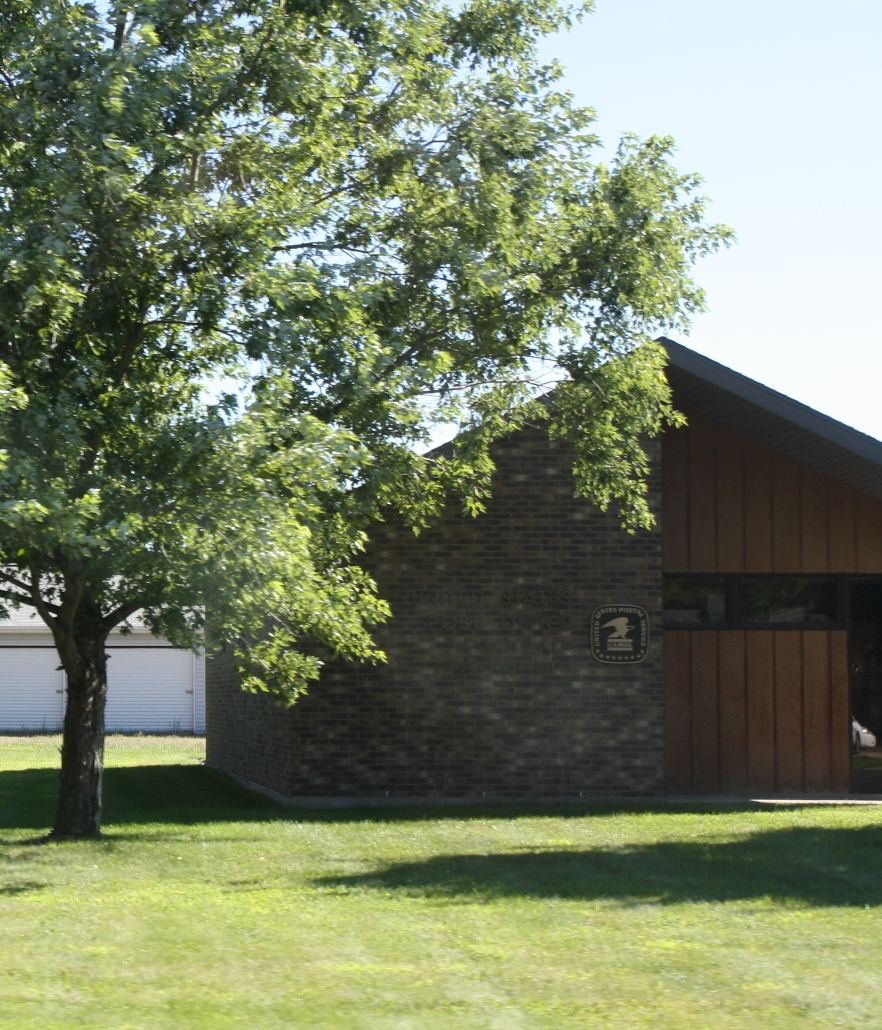
Mountain post office

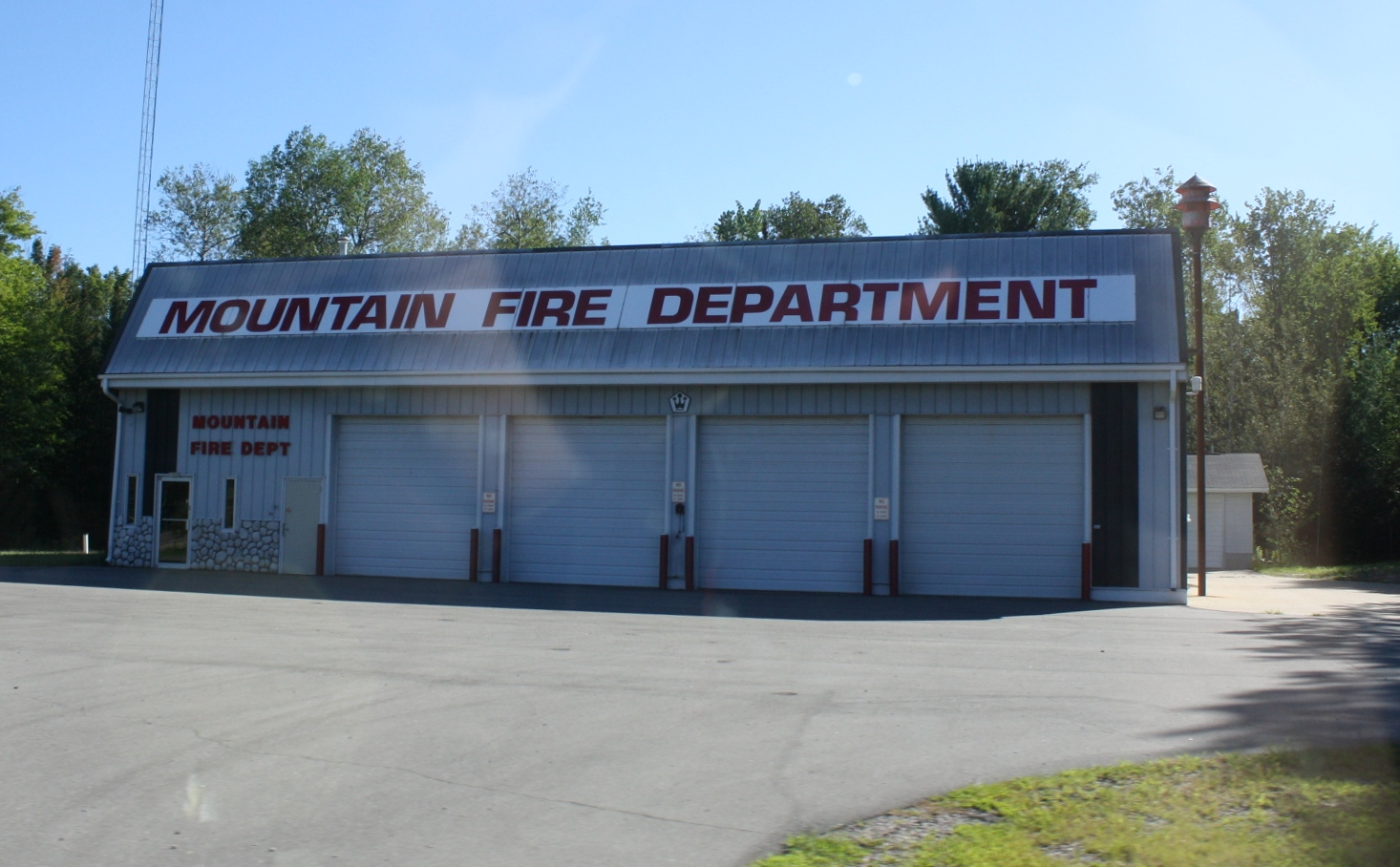
Mountain Fire department

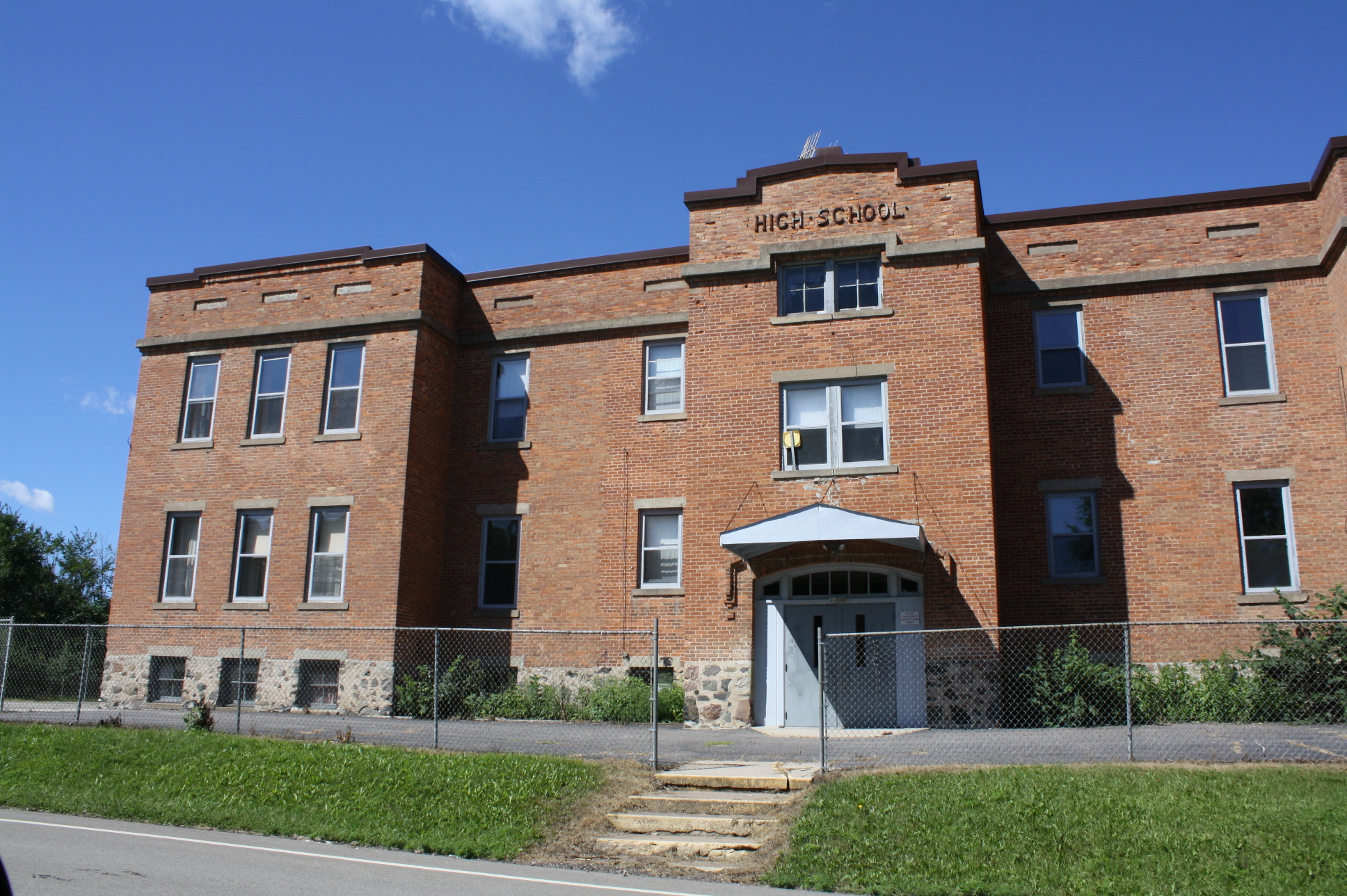
Mountain High School, listed on the National Register of Historic Places

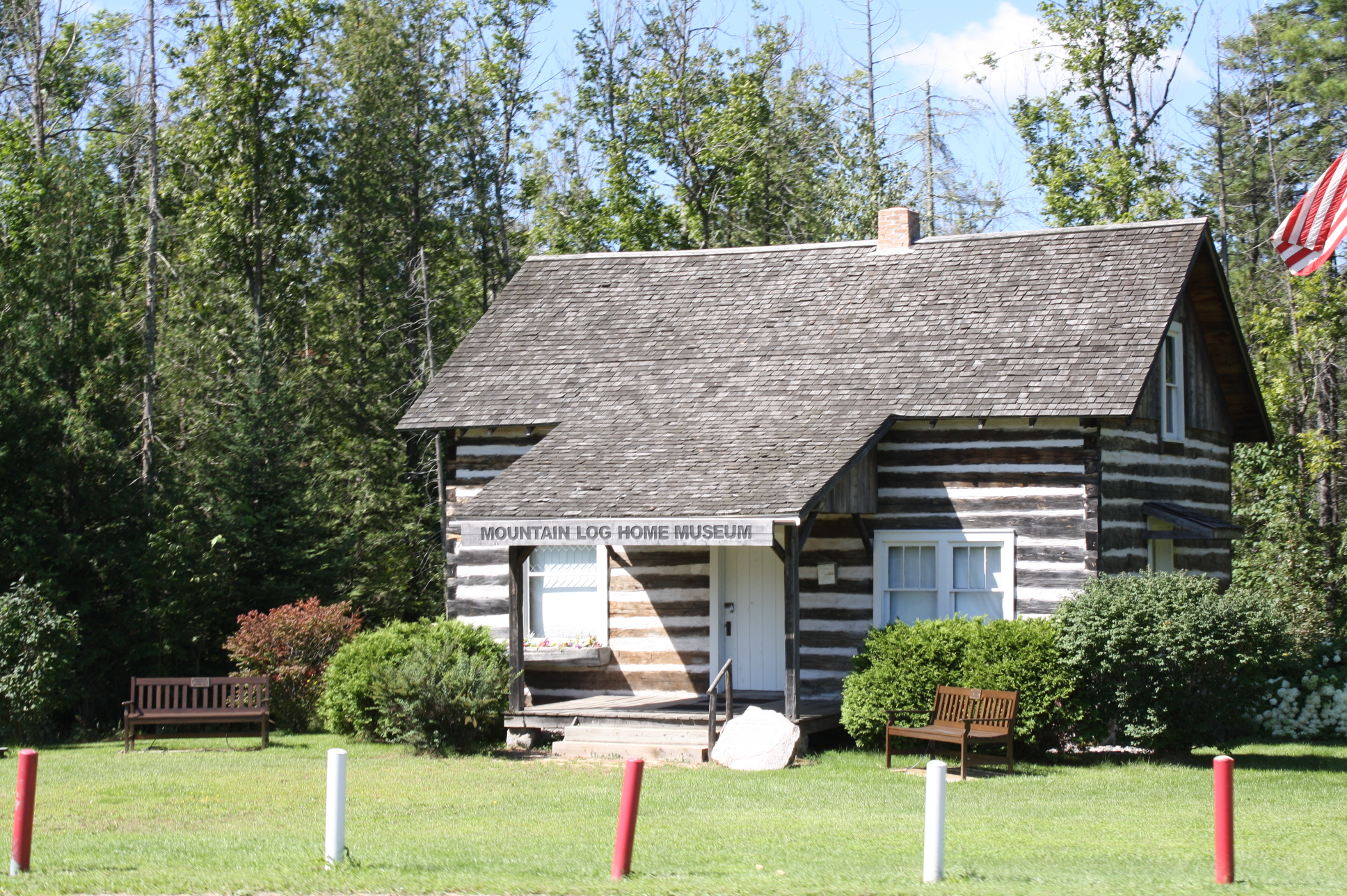
Mountain Log Home Museum

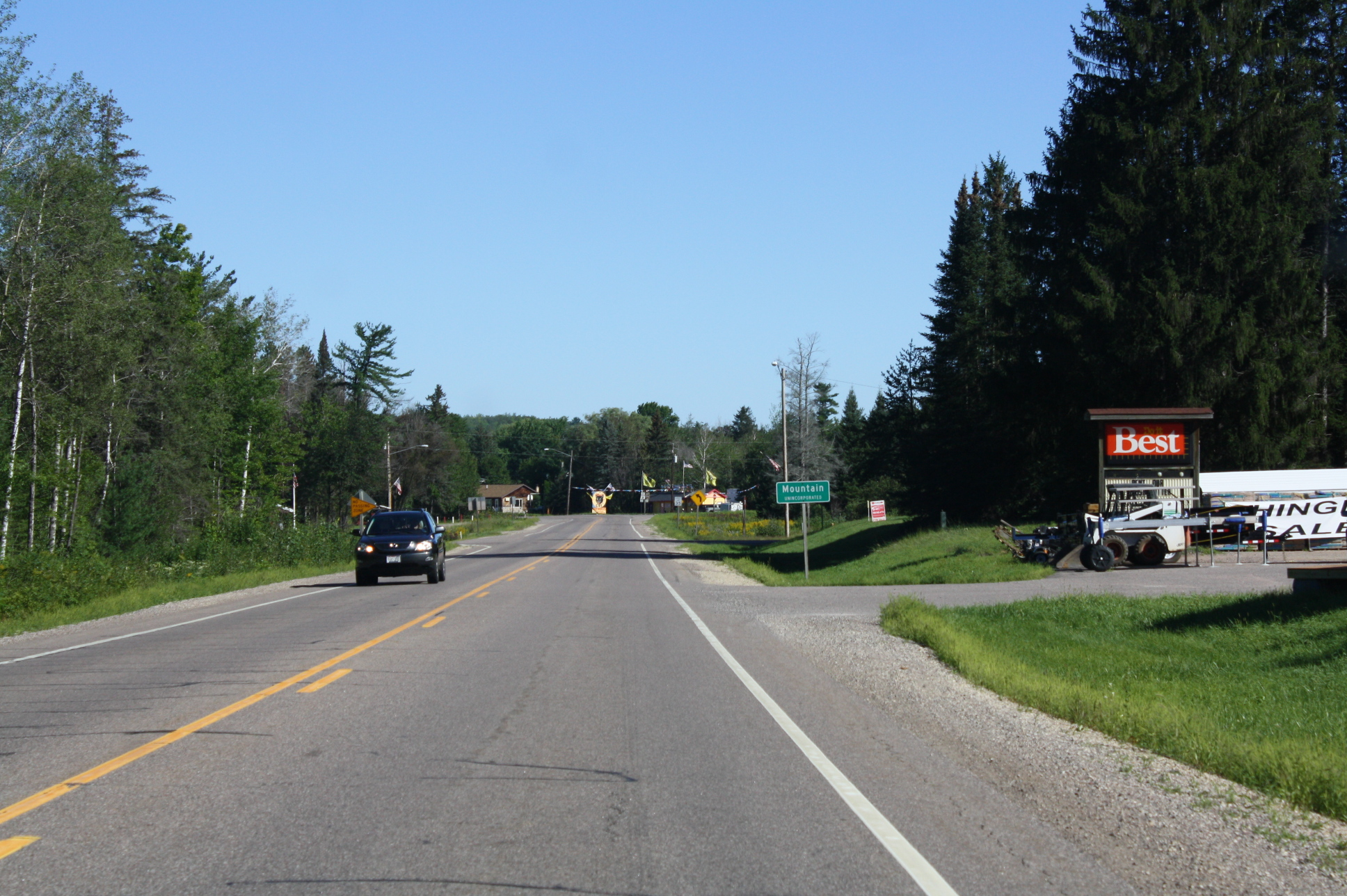
Looking north at the Mountain highway sign

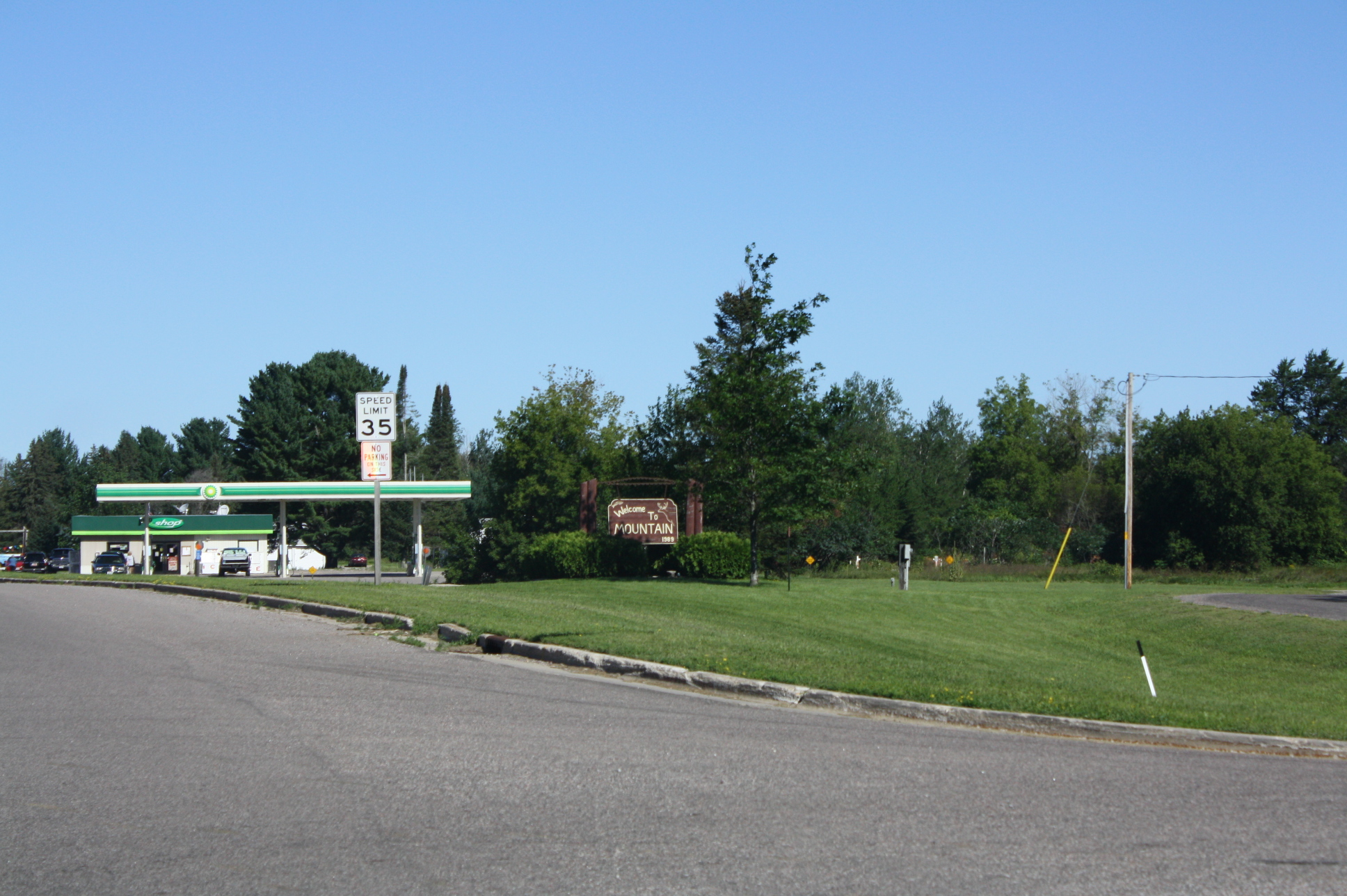
Mountain welcome sign
