= Little Seven Conference (Michigan) =

Former Michigan high school athletic conference

The Little Seven Conference is a former high school athletic conference with most of its membership based in the Upper Peninsula of Michigan. It was founded in 1949 and disbanded in 1968. Most of the conference's member schools belonged to the Michigan High School Athletic Association , except two members who were affiliated with the Wisconsin Interscholastic Athletic Association.

== History ==
Location of Original Little Six Conference Members

Originally named the Little Six Conference, the loop was formed in 1949 by six small high schools: five in Michigan's upper peninsula (Alpha, Channing, Felch, Hermansville and Vulcan) and one just across the Brule River in northern Wisconsin (Florence). Powers-Spalding joined the conference from the Central UP League in 1951, bringing membership to seven schools and giving the circuit its longest-running moniker of the Big Seven Conference. Membership remained stable over the next decade before the conference expanded to eight schools in 1961 with the addition of Carney. With the additional member came a change in name to the Big Eight Conference, and when a ninth member school was added in 1963 (Pembine in Wisconsin), another name change to the Big Nine Conference accompanied their entry. Like the previous name changes, this one was short-lived, and the Big Nine Conference lost Florence to the WIAA-affiliated Northern Lakes Conference and Vulcan to consolidation with Norway. The conference's name was changed to the Big Seven Conference with the loss of two members. Alpha left the conference when it closed in 1967 after merging with Crystal Falls to create the Forest Park district. The conference, now called the Big Six Conference due to Alpha's closing, played for one more season before disbanding in 1968. The six remaining schools joined with three members of the shuttered Mid-Peninsula Conference (Champion, National Mine and Republic) to form the new Skyline Conference. By 1971, all of the former conference's Michigan-based members were lost to rural school district consolidation.

== Conference membership history ==
School	Location	Affiliation	Enrollment	Mascot	Colors	Joined	Left	Conference Joined	Current Conference
Alpha	Alpha, MI	Public	N/A	Mastodons		1949	1967	Closed (merged into Forest Park)	
Channing	Sagola Township, MI	Public	N/A	Railroaders		1949	1968	Skyline	Closed in 1971 (merged into North Dickinson)
Felch	Felch Township, MI	Public	N/A	Foresters		1949	1968	Skyline	Closed in 1971 (merged into North Dickinson)
Florence	Florence, WI	Public	118	Bobcats		1949	1964	Northern Lakes (WIAA)	
Hermansville	Hermansville, MI	Public	N/A	Redskins		1949	1968	Skyline	Closed in 1970 (merged into North Central)
Vulcan	Norway Township, MI	Public	N/A	Giant-Killers		1949	1964	Closed (consolidated into Norway)	
Powers-Spalding	Powers, MI	Public	N/A	Tigers		1951	1968	Skyline	Closed in 1970 (merged into North Central)
Carney	Carney, MI	Public	79	Wolves		1961	1968	Skyline	Central Upper Peninsula
Pembine	Pembine, WI	Public	68	Panthers		1963	1968	Skyline	Northern Lakes (WIAA)

== List of state champions ==
=== Fall sports ===
Boys Cross Country
School	Year	Organization	Division
Vulcan	1960	MHSAA	Class C-D (UP)
Vulcan	1962	MHSAA	Class C-D (UP)

Boys Tennis
School	Year	Organization	Division
Alpha	1965	MHSAA	Class C-D (UP)

=== Winter sports ===
Boys Basketball
School	Year	Organization	Division
Alpha	1950	MHSAA	Class E
Alpha	1954	MHSAA	Class E
Hermansville	1957	MHSAA	Class E
Hermansville	1960	MHSAA	Class E

=== Spring sports ===
Boys Track & Field
School	Year	Organization	Division
Hermansville	1950	MHSAA	Class D-E (UP)
