= Menominee Valley Conference =

High school athletic conference (1945–1947)

The Menominee Valley Conference is a former high school athletic conference with members in northeastern Wisconsin and the upper peninsula of Michigan. Founded in 1945 and disbanded in 1947, its public school members belonged to both the Wisconsin Interscholastic Athletic Association and the Michigan High School Athletic Association.

== History ==
Location of Menominee Valley Conference Members

The Menominee Valley Conference was formed after the completion of World War II by five schools near the Menominee River between Wisconsin and Michigan's upper peninsula. Three members were based in Wisconsin (Marinette, Our Lady of Lourdes in Marinette and Peshtigo), and two were based in Michigan (Menominee and Stephenson). Two members maintained dual memberships in other conferences: Our Lady of Lourdes (Fox Valley Catholic Conference) and Peshtigo (Marinette & Oconto Conference). The Menominee Valley Conference's run was short-lived, ceasing operations in 1947. Our Lady of Lourdes and Peshtigo returned to their respective conferences, and the other three schools (Marinette, Menominee and Stephenson) became independents.

== Conference membership history ==
| School | Location | Affiliation | Mascot | Colors | Joined | Left | Conference Joined | Current Conference |
|---|---|---|---|---|---|---|---|---|
| Marinette | Marinette, WI | Public | Marines | | 1945 | 1947 | Independent | North Eastern |
| Menominee | Menominee, MI | Public | Maroons | | 1945 | 1947 | Independent | Great Northern UP |
| Our Lady of Lourdes | Marinette, WI | Private (Catholic) | Shamrocks | | 1945 | 1947 | Fox Valley Catholic | Marinette & Oconto |
| Peshtigo | Peshtigo, WI | Public | Bulldogs | | 1945 | 1947 | Marinette & Oconto | Packerland |
| Stephenson | Stephenson, MI | Public | Eagles | | 1945 | 1947 | Independent | Skyline |
