= Michael J. McCarthy (general) =

United States Air Force general

Michael J. McCarthy is a retired major general in the United States Air Force.

== Biography ==
A native of Niagara, Wisconsin, he attended the University of Wisconsin-Madison. Additionally he attended Troy State University and Harvard University.

== Career ==
McCarthy joined the Air Force in 1967 and later served in the Vietnam War. Later he became an instructor at the Squadron Officer School. In 1982, he was assigned to The Pentagon and in 1986 he entered the National War College. Following graduation he was given command of the 62nd Military Airlift Wing. He served in the Gulf War before being reassigned to The Pentagon. In 1992, he was given command of the 374th Airlift Wing and before being assigned for a third time to The Pentagon in 1994. He became director of plans and policy of the United States European Command before being assigned for a fourth time to The Pentagon. McCarthy's retirement was effective as of March 1, 2000.

Awards he has received include the Defense Distinguished Service Medal, the Legion of Merit with oak leaf cluster, the Distinguished Flying Cross, the Meritorious Service Medal with two oak leaf clusters, the Air Medal with four oak leaf clusters, the Air Force Commendation Medal with oak leaf cluster, the Vietnam Service Medal, the Vietnam Gallantry Cross, and the Kuwait Liberation Medal (Saudi Arabia).
