= Bonita, Wisconsin =

- Unincorporated community
- Location within Wisconsin Location within the United States
- Coordinates: 45°07′11″N 88°27′31″W
- Country: United States
- State: Wisconsin
- County: Oconto
- Elevation: 902 ft (275 m)
- Time zone: UTC-6 (Central (CST))
  - Summer (DST): UTC-5 (CDT)
- Area code: 920
- GNIS feature ID: 1578830

Bonita is an unincorporated community located in the town of Mountain, Oconto County, Wisconsin, United States. Bonita is 9.3 miles (15.0 km) north-northwest of Suring.
