= Granite Valley Conference =

Wisconsin high school athletic conference (1945-1960)

The Granite Valley Conference is a former high school athletic conference with its membership based in northeastern Wisconsin. Aside from a three-year stint from 1951 to 1954, the conference operated from 1945 to 1960 and its members were affiliated with the Wisconsin Interscholastic Athletic Association.

== History ==
Location of Granite Valley Conference Members (1945-1951)

The Granite Valley Conference was formed in 1945 by four small high schools located along U.S. Route 141 in Marinette County: Amberg, Crivitz, Pembine and Wausaukee. The conference was named after the quarrying industry prevalent in the area, specifically the mining of Amberg granite. In addition to their Granite Valley membership, Crivitz maintained dual membership in the Marinette & Oconto Conference during this period. The conference's roster remained stable through the first stint of its history, which ended in 1951 when the Granite Valley Conference was folded into the larger Marinette & Oconto Conference. This arrangement lasted for three years before three of the four original members joined with Goodman to reform the Granite Valley Conference. The second stint of the Granite Valley Conference lasted six years before folding in 1960 after the consolidation of Amberg into Wausaukee. After the conference ceased operations, Goodman acquired membership in the Northern Lakes Conference, and Pembine and Wausaukee became independents before joining new conferences a few years later.

== Conference membership history ==
=== 1945–1951 ===
School	Location	Affiliation	Mascot	Colors	Joined	Left	Conference Joined	Current Conference
Amberg	Amberg, WI	Public	Ravens		1945	1951	Marinette & Oconto	Closed in 1960 (merged into Wausaukee)
Crivitz	Crivitz, WI	Public	Wolverines		1945	1951	Marinette & Oconto	
Pembine	Pembine, WI	Public	Panthers		1945	1951	Marinette & Oconto	Northern Lakes (coop with Goodman)
Wausaukee	Wausaukee, WI	Public	Rangers		1945	1951	Marinette & Oconto	

=== 1954–1960 ===
School	Location	Affiliation	Mascot	Colors	Joined	Left	Conference Joined	Current Conference
Amberg	Amberg, WI	Public	Ravens		1954	1960	Closed (merged into Wausaukee)	
Goodman	Goodman, WI	Public	Falcons		1954	1960	Northern Lakes	Northern Lakes (coop with Pembine)
Pembine	Pembine, WI	Public	Panthers		1954	1960	Independent	Northern Lakes (coop with Goodman)
Wausaukee	Wausaukee, WI	Public	Rangers		1954	1960	Independent	Marinette & Oconto

== List of conference champions ==
=== Boys Basketball (1945-1951) ===
School	Quantity	Years
Crivitz	5	1947, 1948, 1949, 1950, 1951
Wausaukee	4	1946, 1948, 1949
Amberg	0	
Pembine	0	
