= Mountain High School (Mountain, Wisconsin) =

High school in Mountain, Wisconsin, United States

- Mountain School
- U.S. National Register of Historic Places
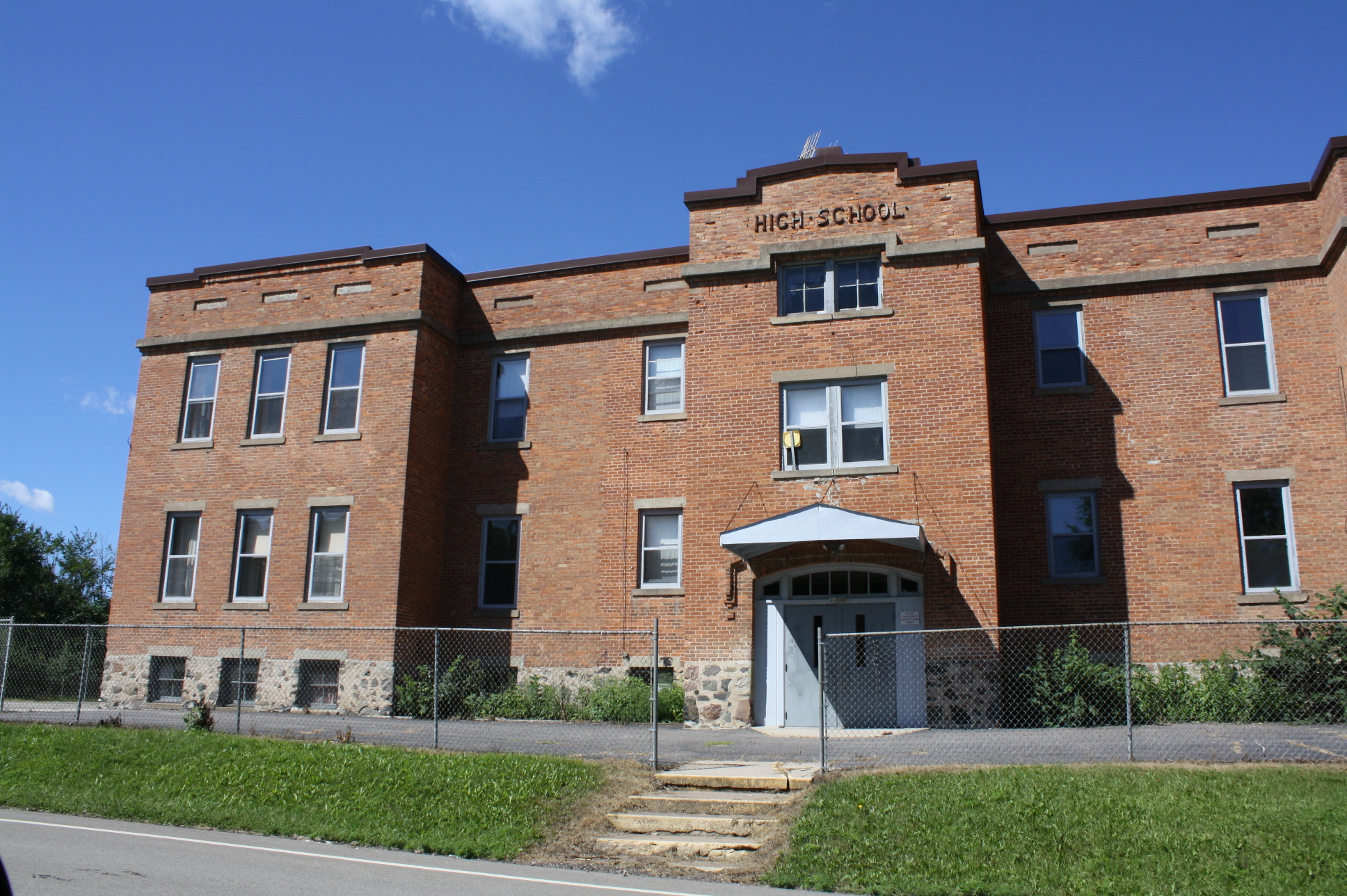

- Location within Wisconsin Location within the United States
- Location: 14330 Hwy W West, Mountain, Wisconsin
- Coordinates: 45.182222°N 88.475833°W
- Area: 2 acres (0.81 ha)
- Built: 1905, 1914, 1961
- Architectural style: Late 19th And 20th Century Revivals
- NRHP reference No.: 00001453
- Added to NRHP: November 22, 2000

Mountain High School (formerly Mountain School) was a high school in Mountain, Oconto County, Wisconsin. It was listed on the National Register of Historic Places as Mountain School in 2000. It has also been known as Mountain Union Free High School and as State Graded School.

A three-story red brick high school built in 1905 at 14330 Highway W West, it was built in three phases, in 1905, 1914, and 1961. It served elementary school students until 2003.

== See also ==
- National Register of Historic Places in Oconto County, Wisconsin
