= Pembine High School =

Coordinates: 45°38′10.2″N 87°59′41.0″W

Beecher-Dunbar-Pembine School
- Pembine, Wisconsin; United States

Information
- Type: Public, Elementary and Secondary
- Motto: Work as a team with students, parents, staff and the community to promote growth and pride in learning.
- Established: 1903
- School district: Beecher-Dunbar-Pembine District
- Superintendent: Lynn Stankevich
- Grades: K–12
- Enrollment: Approx. 240 (2023 estimated)
- Colors: Red, White, Blue
- Mascot: Panthers, Patriots

Pembine High School is a high school in the Town of Pembine, Wisconsin. The school is officially named Beecher-Dunbar-Pembine High School after the district to which it belongs. Opened in 1903, the high school originally served the Pembine District, but later added other geographic areas. The school serves K-12 students, with a student population of 240.

== History ==
The first high school in Pembine was a four-room schoolhouse built in 1903 that served different grades. In 1957 additions of a cafeteria, gym, and shop enlarged and modernized the school. Further additions came in 1973 with four larger classrooms and a library. In 1984, the school added 4 more classrooms and restrooms. In 1990, when the school faced overcrowding problems, it considered consolidating with Niagara High School. The decision to consolidate was turned down by a town vote. In 1996 to answer the overcrowding problem the town passed a $2 million addition to Pembine High School that nearly doubled the square footage.

== Academics ==
Pembine High School requires at least 25 credits in core courses to graduate. Departments include:

- Art
- Career and Technical Education
- English
- Math
- Music
- Science
- Social Studies

On December 23, 2013, seven teachers at Pembine High School were among 77 statewide to earn National Board Certification. This made Pembine the school with the highest concentration of Nationally Board Certified Educators in the state.

== Extracurricular activities ==
Extracurricular activities include:

- Art Club
- Band
- Handbells
- Math Club
- Drama Club
- School Yearbook
- Student Council
- Forensics
- French Club
- National Honor Society
- Students Against Dangerous Decisions (SADD)

=== Sports ===
Pembine High School has three mascots for its athletic teams. For football, Pembine plays 8-man football with Goodman-Armstrong Creek High School to make up the team. Girls' high school basketball, girls' high school softball, boys' high school baseball, girls' cross country and boys' cross country are consolidated with Goodman-Armstrong Creek High School to make up the Pembine-Goodman Patriots. The mascot of Pembine High School for girls' high school volleyball, boys' high school basketball, and golf is the Panther.

==== Sports offered (List may be incomplete) ====
- Boys' basketball
- Girls' basketball
- Football
- Girls' softball
- Boys' baseball
- Boys' & girls' golf
- Girls' volleyball
- Cross country

==== Athletic conference affiliation history ====
- Nicolet Conference (1938-1942)
- Granite Valley Conference (1945-1951)
- Marinette & Oconto Conference (1951-1954)
- Granite Valley Conference (1954-1960)
- Big Eight Conference (Michigan) (1963-1964)
- Big Seven Conference (Michigan) (1964-1967)
- Big Six Conference (Michigan) (1967-1968)
- Skyline Conference (Michigan) (1968-1972)
- Northern Lakes Conference (1972-present)
