= St. Thomas Aquinas Academy (Marinette, Wisconsin) =

- formerly Marinette Catholic Central High School

Location
- 1200 Main Street; Marinette, (Marinette County), Wisconsin 54143; United States; 45°5′37″N 87°37′9″W

Information
- Type: Private, Coeducational
- Religious affiliation: Roman Catholic
- Established: 1876
- Principal: Matt Draheim
- Grades: 6–12
- Student to teacher ratio: 10:1
- Colors: Green and gold
- Athletics conference: M&O
- Team name: Cavaliers
- Athletic Director: Matt Centeno
- Website: https://www.saintthomasaquinasacademy.org/

St. Thomas Aquinas Academy High School, formerly known as Marinette Catholic Central High School, is a private, Roman Catholic high school in Marinette, Wisconsin. It is in the Diocese of Green Bay.

== History ==
The school's roots go back to 1876 when St. Mary's Institute was opened with a handful of female pupils, many from local Irish families. During the next 50 years, the school underwent several transformations. By World War I it was a co-ed school. At one time, the school building at 1200 Main Street included a grade school, but by the 1960s, when enrollment swelled, the building was used solely as a high school.

Marinette Catholic Central High School, now part of the St. Thomas Aquinas system of Catholic day schools, was founded in 1958, when the four Marinette parishes of St. Joseph, Sacred Heart, St. Anthony, and Our Lady of Lourdes, assumed joint control of the former Our Lady of Lourdes High School.

The school consists of an elementary program (pre-K-5th) at its campus in Peshtigo and 6th-12th at the main campus in Marinette.

== Extra-curricular activities ==
During its high-enrollment period, the school was known for its drama program, Windsor Players, and its choral music program.

=== Athletics ===
In 1964, the Catholic Central Cavaliers basketball team defeated Appleton Xavier to win the Catholic state basketball championship.

In 1986, the Catholic Central Cavaliers Baseball team, won the Class B WISAA State Championship. This was the first State Baseball Championship in school history.

Between the years of 1986-1991 the Catholic Central Cavvies took state titles for their volleyball program several times.

In 2003, Catholic Central and nearby Lena High School combined their football teams. This arrangement is allowed under WIAA rules to create opportunities for students who might not be able to participate if schools were unable to operate a program.

=== Athletic conference affiliation history ===
- Marinette & Oconto Conference (1927-1929)
- Fox Valley Catholic Conference (1929-1937, 1940-1942, 1944-1971)
- Menominee Valley Conference (1945-1947)
- Fox Valley Christian Conference (1971-1999)
- Marinette & Oconto Conference (1999–present)
