= Three Lakes High School (Wisconsin) =

Coordinates: 45.3970°N 91.8433°W

Location
- Three Lakes School District; 6930 W. School Street; Three Lakes, Oneida, Wisconsin; United States

Information
- School type: Public, High School
- Principal: Justin Szews
- Teaching staff: 15.65 (FTE)
- Grades: 9-12
- Enrollment: 145 (2023-2024)
- Student to teacher ratio: 9.33
- Color
- Mascot: Bluejay

Three Lakes Junior/Senior High School is a public school serving grades 7–12. It also includes an elementary school for grades K–6. The student body comprises approximately 250–280 students. The principal is Gene Welheofer, and the district administrator is Teri Maney. The school’s mission statement is “Teaching students to be productive citizens.”

== Extracurriculars ==
Three Lakes offers a variety of different extra curricular activities, from sports to arts to sciences. There are a number of different sports that students can participate in, which include:

	Boys	Girls
Fall	Football	Cross Country
	Cross Country	Volleyball
	Soccer	
Winter	Basketball	Basketball
	Wrestling	Wrestling
Spring	Baseball	Softball
	Golf	Golf
	Track and Field	Track and Field
		Soccer

- Football (Fall)
- Cross Country - Coed (Fall)
- Soccer - Boys (Fall)
- Volleyball - Girls (Fall)
- Basketball - Boys (Winter)
- Basketball - Girls (Winter)
- Wrestling - Coed (Winter)
- Baseball (Spring)
- Softball (Spring)
- Golf - Coed (Spring)
- Track and Field - Coed (Spring)
- Soccer - Girls (Spring)

Students who choose not to partake in the athletic activities choose to be sports managers, or get involved in other extracurriculars such as concert band, choir, forensic speechreading, drama, trap shooting, arts, or sciences.

Band & Choir typically have 3-4 concerts per year, and offer many instrumental options in band. Three Lakes School usually hosts the district's WSMA Large Group Festival each year, which is a large music festival in which all of the schools in the District prepare pieces and perform for individual benefit for different judges. They are then individually scored and placed at a 1st, 2nd, or 3rd, based on performance. Three Lakes also is very active in Solo & Ensemble, where students can prepares pieces alone, or as duets or groups. They then perform at the district level first, then may advance to the state level based on the judges scores.

The drama department usually holds 1-3 performances per year, or one each semester. The performances can range from plays to musicals, some being well known, like The Princess Bride and Alice in Wonderland, and some smaller productions such as Stranded. Forensics is another activity many students enjoy and partake in, which deals with speeches, story telling, and public speaking. Trap shooting is a fairly new team that many Northwoods students enjoy which is competitive.

=== Athletic conference affiliation history ===
- Land O'Lakes Conference (1927-1937)
- Northern Lakes Conference (1937–present)

== FAB Lab ==
One of the newest additions to the school. Fabrication Laboratories (Fab Lab) come from the Massachusetts Institute of Technology (MIT), the Center for Bits and Atoms (CBA). MIT's Center for Bits and Atoms is an interdisciplinary initiative exploring the boundary between computer science and physical science. CBA studies how to turn data into things, and things into data.

A Fab Lab consists of off-the-shelf, industrial-grade fabrication and electronics tools, wrapped in open source software and programs written by researchers at MIT's Center for Bits & Atoms. The Fab Lab suite of equipment supports design and fabrication activities. 2D and 3D software as well as micro scribes and scanners support the design portion of the project. To support the fabrication portion of the project vinyl cutters, laser engravers, 3D printers, mini-mills, CNC routers and plasma cutters. A video teleconferencing unit supports distance collaboration between labs. Students use all of these new, exciting, and different tools in learning to create new things and bring to life new ideas. TLHS Fab Lab Faculty include Mr. Mike Gorney, Mr. Brad Volkmann, and Mr. Al Votis.
