= Goodman, Wisconsin =

- Town
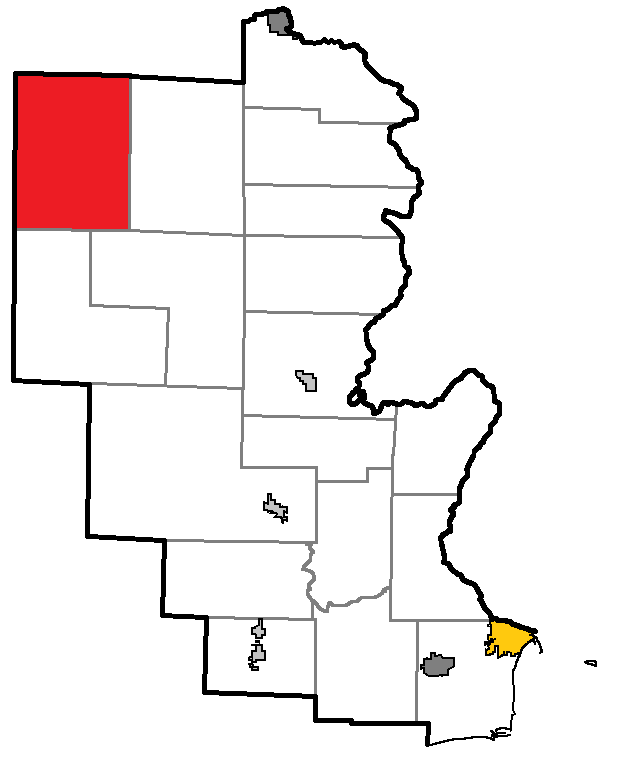
- Location of Goodman, within Marinette County
- Coordinates: 45°38′0″N 88°19′30″W
- Country: United States
- State: Wisconsin
- County: Marinette

Area
  - Total: 107.6 sq mi (278.6 km^{2})
  - Land: 105.9 sq mi (274.2 km^{2})
  - Water: 1.7 sq mi (4.4 km^{2})
- Elevation: 1,375 ft (419 m)

Population (2020)
  - Total: 607
  - Density: 5.73/sq mi (2.21/km^{2})
- Time zone: UTC-6 (Central (CST))
  - Summer (DST): UTC-5 (CDT)
- FIPS code: 55-29775
- GNIS feature ID: 1583289

Goodman is a town in Marinette County, Wisconsin, United States. The population was 607 at the 2020 census. The census-designated place of Goodman is located in the town.

== Geography ==
According to the United States Census Bureau, the town has a total area of 107.6 square miles (278.6 km^{2}), of which 105.9 square miles (274.2 km^{2}) is land and 1.7 square miles (4.4 km^{2}) (1.59%) is water.

== Demographics ==
As of the census of 2000, there were 820 people, 360 households, and 240 families residing in the town. The population density was 7.7 inhabitants per square mile (3.0/km^{2}). There were 680 housing units at an average density of 6.4 per square mile (2.5/km^{2}). The racial makeup of the town was 98.29% White, 0.24% African American, 0.49% Native American, 0.12% Asian, 0.12% from other races, and 0.73% from two or more races. Hispanic or Latino of any race were 0.98% of the population.

There were 360 households, out of which 21.7% had children under the age of 18 living with them, 60.6% were married couples living together, 3.3% had a female householder with no husband present, and 33.3% were non-families. 28.1% of all households were made up of individuals, and 14.7% had someone living alone who was 65 years of age or older. The average household size was 2.28 and the average family size was 2.75.

In the town, the population was spread out, with 18.7% under the age of 18, 6.7% from 18 to 24, 23.8% from 25 to 44, 27.7% from 45 to 64, and 23.2% who were 65 years of age or older. The median age was 45 years. For every 100 females, there were 109.7 males. For every 100 females age 18 and over, there were 103.4 males.

The median income for a household in the town was $31,087, and the median income for a family was $34,250. Males had a median income of $30,938 versus $20,750 for females. The per capita income for the town was $15,941. About 6.6% of families and 9.4% of the population were below the poverty line, including 12.3% of those under age 18 and 9.3% of those age 65 or over.

== History ==
The origins of Goodman date to the late 1800s, when it was created as a logging community for the Sawyer-Goodman Lumber Company by the Goodman brothers: James B. Goodman (1841–1907), Robert F. Goodman (1844–1924), and William O. Goodman (1848–1936). The settlement was initially named Dunbar in 1899, and the name was changed to Goodman in 1915.

Robert F. Goodman's son Robert B. Goodman (1871–1957) is thought to be one of the first loggers in the country to utilize selective cutting practices. During a 62-year period, starting in 1927, the Goodman Lumber Company removed 417 million board feet of timber. Today, due to the use of selective cutting the volume of timber available is of similar volume as there was in 1927. The town center contains the Goodman Club House, which had a ballroom, theater, and restaurant. This Club House was once known to draw well-known performers, and it's recently reopened under new ownership.

== 100th anniversary ==
Goodman celebrated its 100th anniversary on August 8–9, 2008. It's estimated that over 4,000 people attended. Events included a play commemorating the founding of Goodman as company town, a lumberjack breakfast, a lumberjack exhibition, saw playing, a parade, and a fireworks display.
