= Mountain, Wisconsin =

- Town
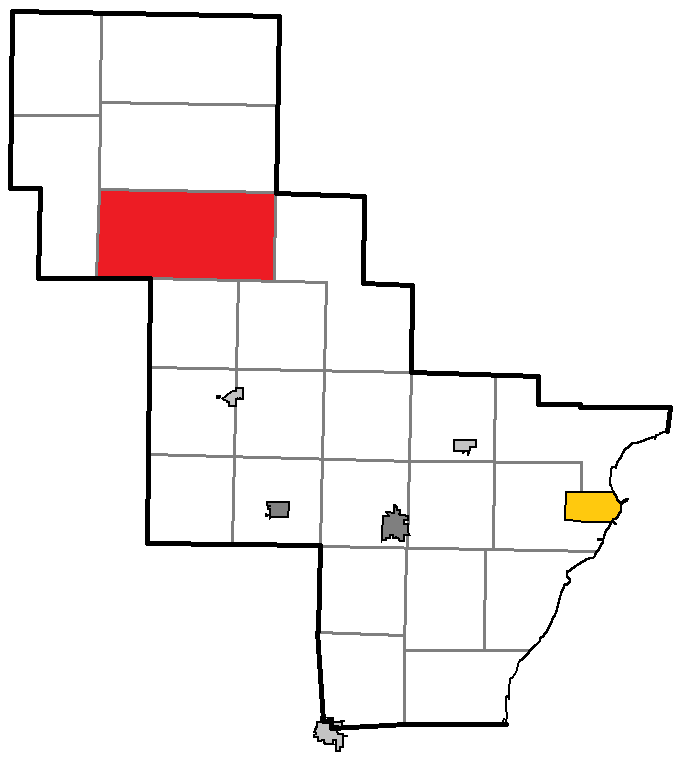
- Location of Mountain, within Oconto County
- Coordinates: 45°9′17″N 88°26′20″W
- Country: United States
- State: Wisconsin
- County: Oconto

Area
  - Total: 72.7 sq mi (188.2 km^{2})
  - Land: 71.6 sq mi (185.4 km^{2})
  - Water: 1.1 sq mi (2.8 km^{2})
- Elevation: 902 ft (275 m)

Population (2020)
  - Total: 832
  - Density: 11.6/sq mi (4.49/km^{2})
- Time zone: UTC-6 (Central (CST))
  - Summer (DST): UTC-5 (CDT)
- FIPS code: 55-54630
- GNIS feature ID: 1582716
- Website: townofmountain.com

Mountain is a town in Oconto County, Wisconsin, United States. The population was 832 at the 2020 census.

== Communities ==
- Bonita is a lightly developed community southwest of the community of Mountain.
- Mountain is an unincorporated census-designated place located mainly at the intersection of WIS 32/64 and County Road W.
- Kingston is an unincorporated community primarily located on the intersection of Kingston Road and W Shore Drive. The immediate area only comprises few homes. The community was originally known as Kingston Station or Kingston Line because of the Chicago and North Western railroad which ran through the community. Kingston was often used as a stopping off place for early settlers.

== History ==
This town was named Armstrong until August 1997, when the name was changed to Mountain. The town of Armstrong was set off from the town of How in 1897. Armstrong originally consisted of the present day towns of Doty, Lakewood, and Mountain.

== Geography ==
According to the United States Census Bureau, the town has a total area of 72.7 square miles (188 km^{2}), of which 71.6 square miles (185 km^{2}) is land and 1.1 square miles (2.8 km^{2}) (1.51%) is water.

== Demographics ==
As of the census of 2000, there were 860 people, 380 households, and 248 families residing in the town. The population density was 12.0 people per square mile (4.6/km^{2}). There were 883 housing units at an average density of 12.3 per square mile (4.8/km^{2}). The racial makeup of the town was 98.26% White, 0.47% Native American, 0.35% Asian, and 0.93% from two or more races. Hispanic or Latino of any race were 0.35% of the population.

There were 380 households, out of which 22.1% had children under the age of 18 living with them, 55.3% were married couples living together, 5.8% had a female householder with no husband present, and 34.7% were non-families. 30.0% of all households were made up of individuals, and 16.1% had someone living alone who was 65 years of age or older. The average household size was 2.26 and the average family size was 2.76.

In the town, the population was spread out, with 21.5% under the age of 18, 6.0% from 18 to 24, 22.6% from 25 to 44, 27.7% from 45 to 64, and 22.2% who were 65 years of age or older. The median age was 45 years. For every 100 females, there were 99.1 males. For every 100 females age 18 and over, there were 99.1 males.

The median income for a household in the town was $30,598, and the median income for a family was $35,341. Males had a median income of $27,321 versus $20,208 for females. The per capita income for the town was $16,440. About 8.6% of families and 10.4% of the population were below the poverty line, including 13.0% of those under age 18 and 3.0% of those age 65 or over.
