= Florence High School (Wisconsin) =

Location
- 400 Olive Avenue; Florence, Florence County, Wisconsin 54121; United States
- Coordinates: 45.9247°N 88.2485°W

Information
- School type: Secondary
- School district: School District of Florence County
- Administrator: Ben Niehaus
- Principal: Brandon Jerue
- Staff: 13.00 (FTE)
- Enrollment: 118 (2022-2023)
- Student to teacher ratio: 9.08
- Colors: Green and gold
- Fight song: Go U Northwestern
- Athletics conference: Northern Lakes Conference
- Mascot: Bobcat
- Website: www.myflorence.org

Florence High School is a high school located in Florence, Wisconsin. The school mascot is the Bobcats. The school is situated on the NW corner of Olive Avenue and Norway Street.

== History ==
The high school was established in 1900 and expanded in 1913. A fire in March 1929 destroyed the Old Florence High School. A new high school was designed in 1929 by Smith & Brant Architects of Manitowoc, Wisconsin and completed in 1930. The high school was remodeled in the 1970s with a new gymnasium and locker rooms in addition to classroom upgrades in the technical, science and home economics area. In 1993, another remodel included an addition which houses the school library and the Florence County Public Library.

== Athletics ==
Florence is a part of the Northern Lakes Conference.

- Football
- Volleyball
- Boys Basketball
- Girls Basketball
- Boys Golf
- Girls Golf
- Track and Field
- Baseball
- Softball
- Wrestling
- Poms

== Organizations ==
- Band
- Jazz Ensemble
- Chorus
- Hi-Q
- Drama Club
- National Honor Society
- Forensics
- Spanish National Honor Society
- Student Council
- T.O.R.P.E.D.O.S.
- Student Library Advisory Group (SLAG)
