= Crivitz School District =

School district in Crivitz, Wisconsin, United States

Address
- 400 South Avenue Crivitz, Wisconsin, 54114; United States
- Coordinates: 45°13′31.3″N 88°00′05.2″W

District information
- Type: Public school district
- Grades: PK–12
- President: Mike Dama
- Schools: 3
- NCES District ID: 5502970

Students and staff
- Enrollment: 737 (2016-2017)
- Teachers: 48.00 (on an FTE basis)
- Student–teacher ratio: 15.35
- District mascot: Wolverine
- Colors: Blue and Gold

Other information
- Website: www.crivitz.k12.wi.us

Crivitz School District is a public school district in Crivitz, Wisconsin, United States. It opened a new Crivitz High School in the fall of 1998 which its athletic teams are nicknamed the Wolverines and bear the colors blue and gold.
