= Niagara, Wisconsin =

- City
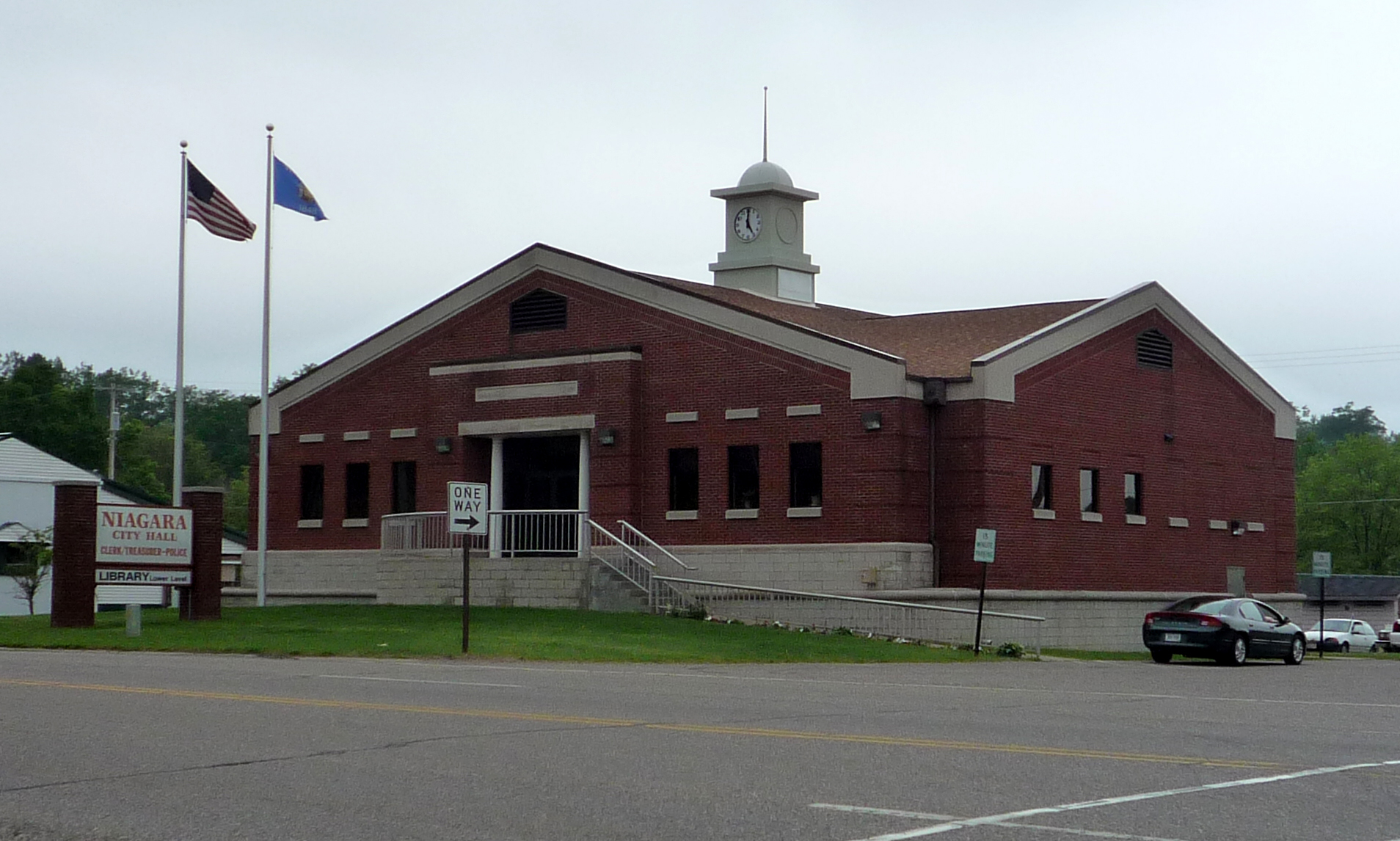
- Niagara City Hall and Library

- Location of Niagara in Marinette County, Wisconsin

- Location within Wisconsin Location within the United States
- Coordinates: 45°46′42″N 88°0′14″W
- Country: United States
- State: Wisconsin
- County: Marinette

Area
  - Total: 3.01 sq mi (7.80 km^{2})
  - Land: 2.76 sq mi (7.15 km^{2})
  - Water: 0.25 sq mi (0.64 km^{2})

Population (2020)
  - Total: 1,602
  - Density: 559.0/sq mi (215.83/km^{2})
- Time zone: UTC-6 (Central (CST))
  - Summer (DST): UTC-5 (CDT)
- ZIP codes: 54151
- Area codes: 715 & 534
- FIPS code: 55-57325
- Website: Official website

Niagara is a city in Marinette County, Wisconsin, United States. The population was 1,602 at the 2020 census. The city lies to the north of and adjacent to the Town of Niagara. It is part of the Marinette, WI–MI Micropolitan Statistical Area.

== History ==
The city of Niagara was founded in 1900 on the banks of the Menominee River. Niagara is an Iroquois word that means "thundering waters", which is also used in the famous Niagara Falls, between New York state and the Canadian province of Ontario.

== Geography ==
Niagara is located at 45°46′41″N 88°0′13″W (45.778244, -88.003867).

According to the United States Census Bureau, the city has a total area of 3.00 square miles (7.77 km^{2}), of which 2.75 square miles (7.12 km^{2}) is land and 0.25 square miles (0.65 km^{2}) is water.

== Demographics ==
Historical population
| Census | Pop. | Note | %± |
|---|---|---|---|
| 1920 | 1,946 | | — |
| 1930 | 2,033 | | 4.5% |
| 1940 | 2,266 | | 11.5% |
| 1950 | 2,022 | | −10.8% |
| 1960 | 2,098 | | 3.8% |
| 1970 | 2,347 | | 11.9% |
| 1980 | 2,079 | | −11.4% |
| 1990 | 1,999 | | −3.8% |
| 2000 | 1,880 | | −6.0% |
| 2010 | 1,624 | | −13.6% |
| 2020 | 1,602 | | −1.4% |
U.S. Decennial Census

=== 2010 census ===
As of the census of 2010, there were 1,624 people, 695 households, and 440 families living in the city. The population density was 590.5 inhabitants per square mile (228.0/km^{2}). There were 797 housing units at an average density of 289.8 per square mile (111.9/km^{2}). The racial makeup of the city was 97.7% White, 0.1% African American, 0.6% Native American, 0.4% Asian, 0.2% from other races, and 0.9% from two or more races. Hispanic or Latino people of any race were 1.2% of the population.

There were 695 households, of which 29.9% had children under the age of 18 living with them, 47.5% were married couples living together, 10.4% had a female householder with no husband present, 5.5% had a male householder with no wife present, and 36.7% were non-families. 30.4% of all households were made up of individuals, and 15.8% had someone living alone who was 65 years of age or older. The average household size was 2.34 and the average family size was 2.88.

The median age in the city was 41.1 years. 24.4% of residents were under the age of 18; 6% were between the ages of 18 and 24; 25.2% were from 25 to 44; 26.6% were from 45 to 64; and 18% were 65 years of age or older. The gender makeup of the city was 48.0% male and 52.0% female.

=== 2000 census ===
As of the census of 2000, there were 1,880 people, 760 households, and 494 families living in the city. The population density was 686.1 inhabitants per square mile (264.9/km^{2}). There were 812 housing units at an average density of 296.3 per square mile (114.4/km^{2}). The racial makeup of the city was 99.52% White, 0.05% Black or African American, 0.16% Native American, 0.05% Asian, 0.05% from other races, and 0.16% from two or more races. 0.74% of the population were Hispanic or Latino of any race.

There were 760 households, out of which 32.4% had children under the age of 18 living with them, 50.7% were married couples living together, 9.7% had a female householder with no husband present, and 34.9% were non-families. 31.1% of all households were made up of individuals, and 16.7% had someone living alone who was 65 years of age or older. The average household size was 2.39 and the average family size was 3.01.

In the city, the population was spread out, with 26.8% under the age of 18, 6.5% from 18 to 24, 27.6% from 25 to 44, 20.5% from 45 to 64, and 18.7% who were 65 years of age or older. The median age was 39 years. For every 100 females, there were 90.7 males. For every 100 females age 18 and over, there were 84.6 males.

The median income for a household in the city was $33,828, and the median income for a family was $41,711. Males had a median income of $35,000 versus $20,820 for females. The per capita income for the city was $15,616. About 5.4% of families and 9.9% of the population were below the poverty line, including 8.6% of those under age 18 and 15.9% of those age 65 or over.

== Notable people ==
- Anna DeForge, professional basketball player
- Royal T. Farrand, physician and college football player
- Michael J. McCarthy, U.S. Air Force Major General
- The Fendermen, musical duo whose lead guitarist, Jim Sundquist, was born in Niagara.
- Amy J.H. Kind, physician and director of Center for Health Disparities Research at UW-Madison

== Images ==
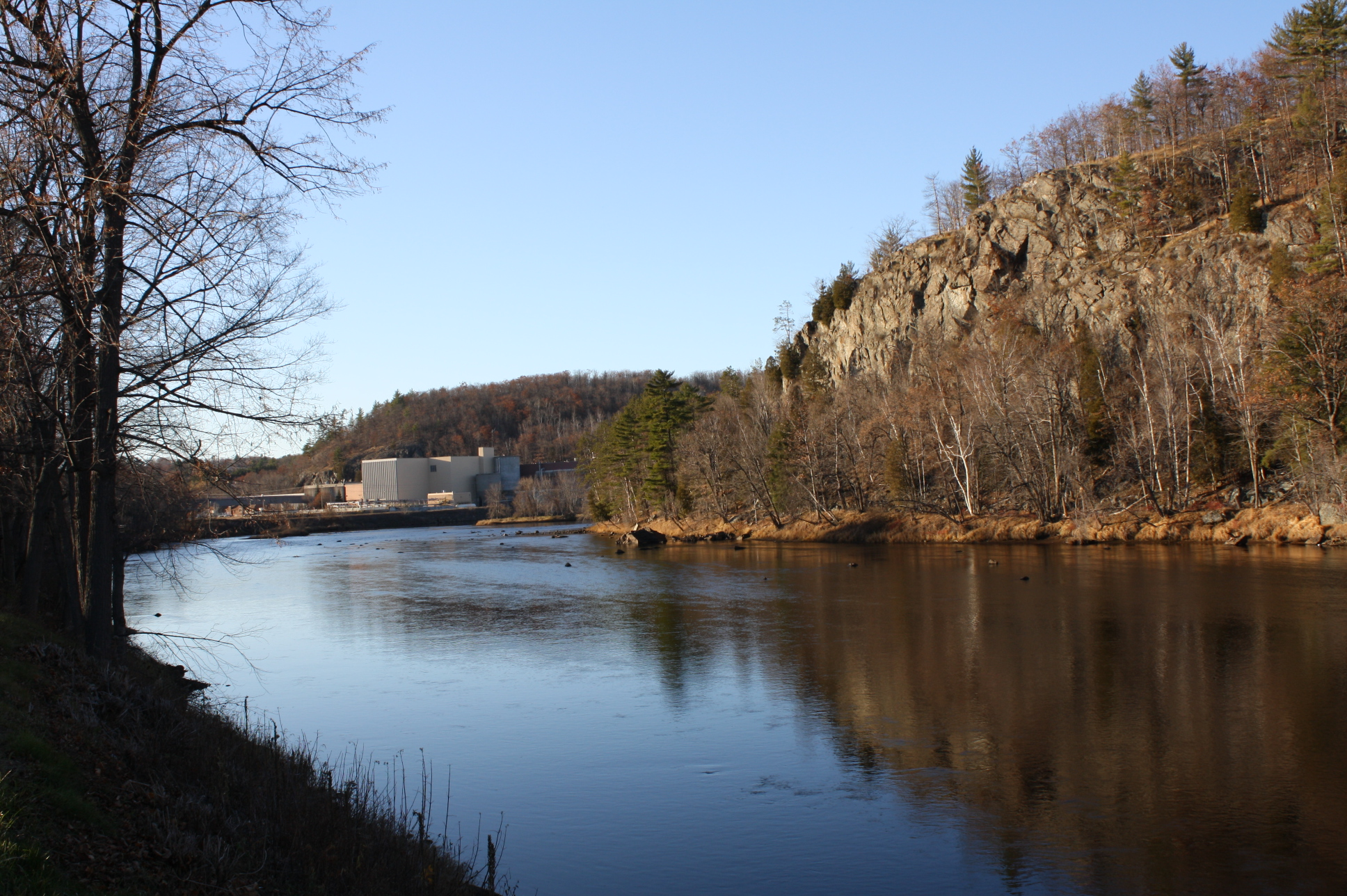
Menominee River in Niagara

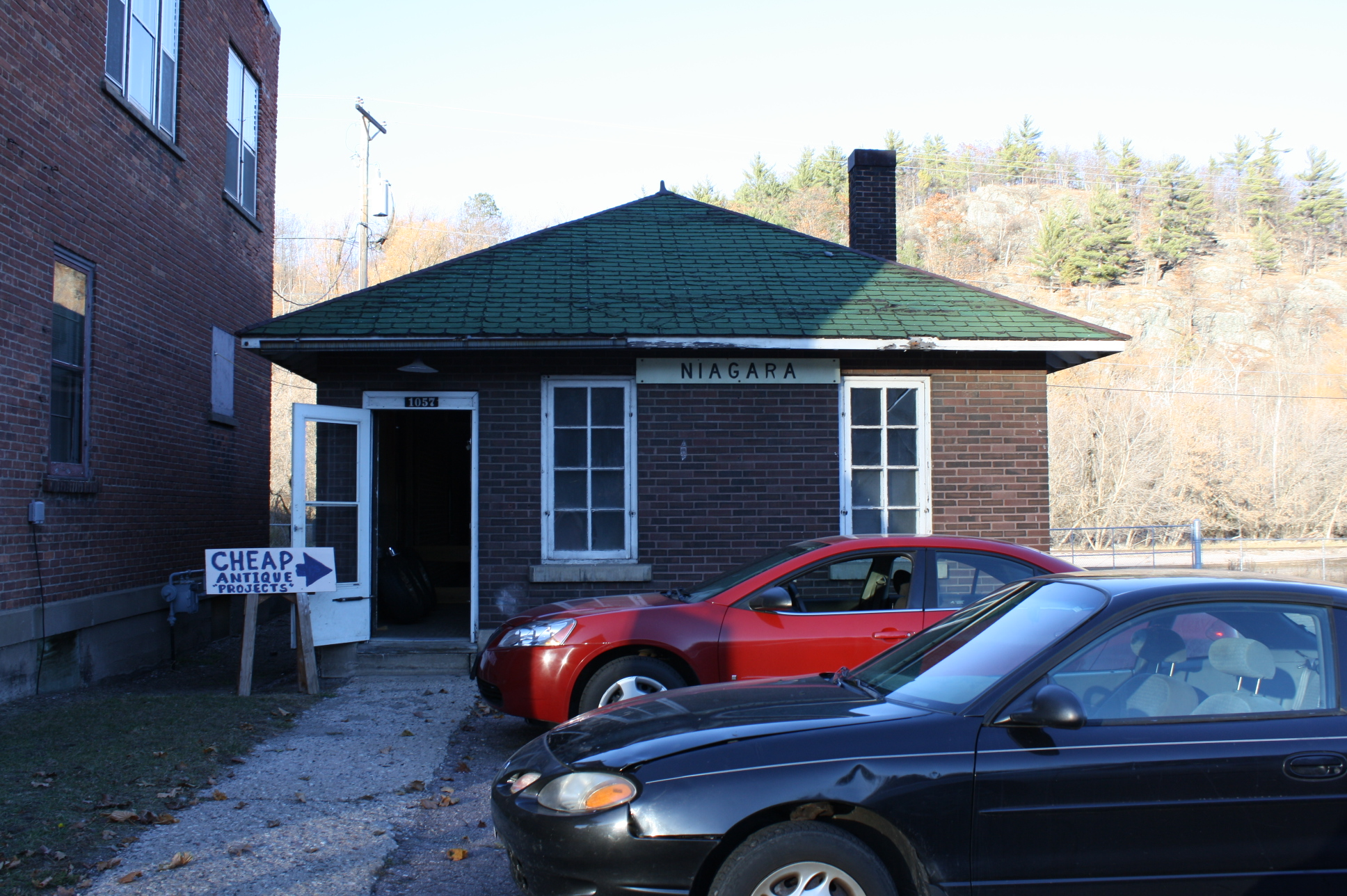
Train depot

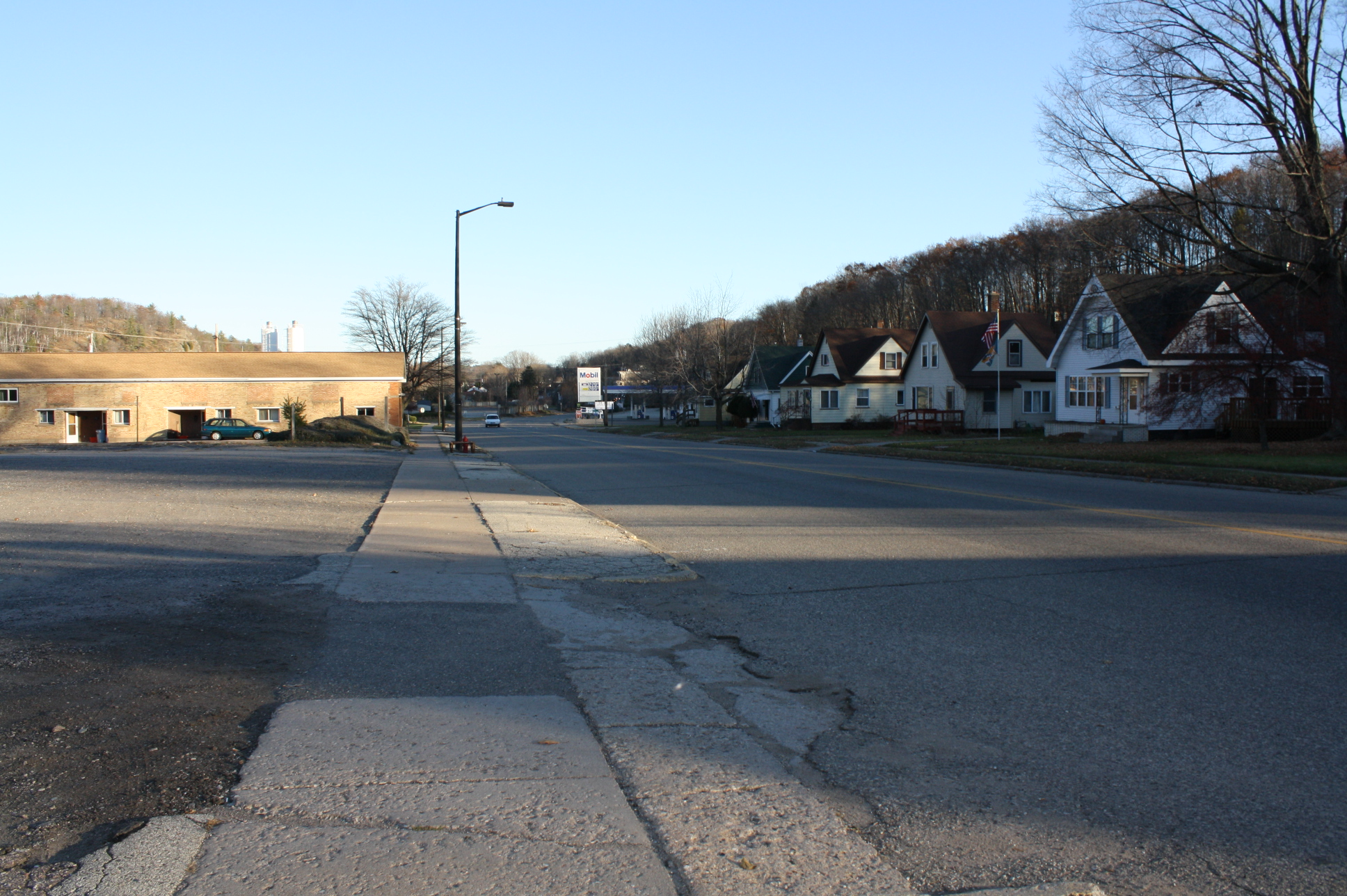
A residential neighborhood in Niagara along US141

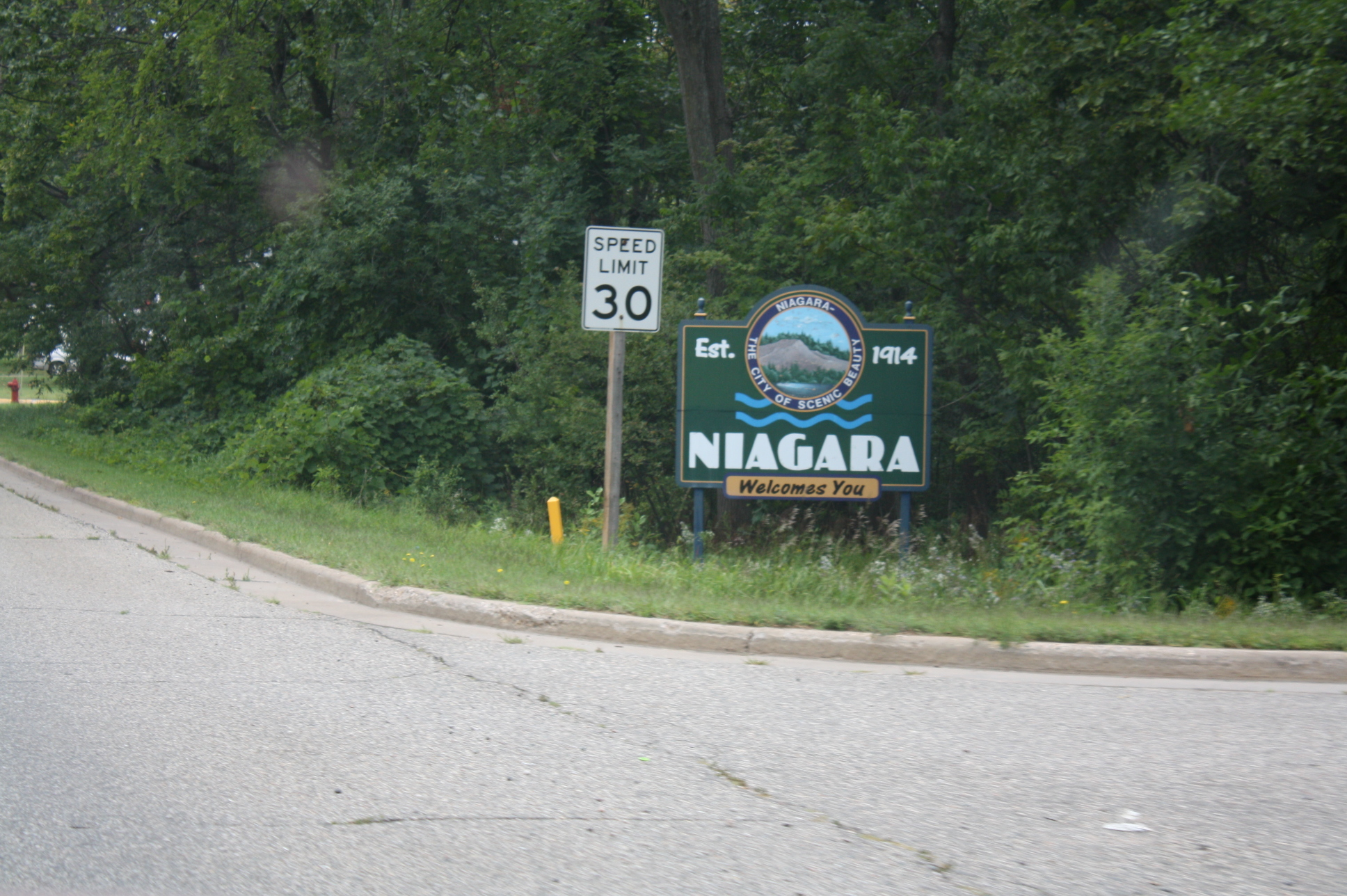
City welcome sign

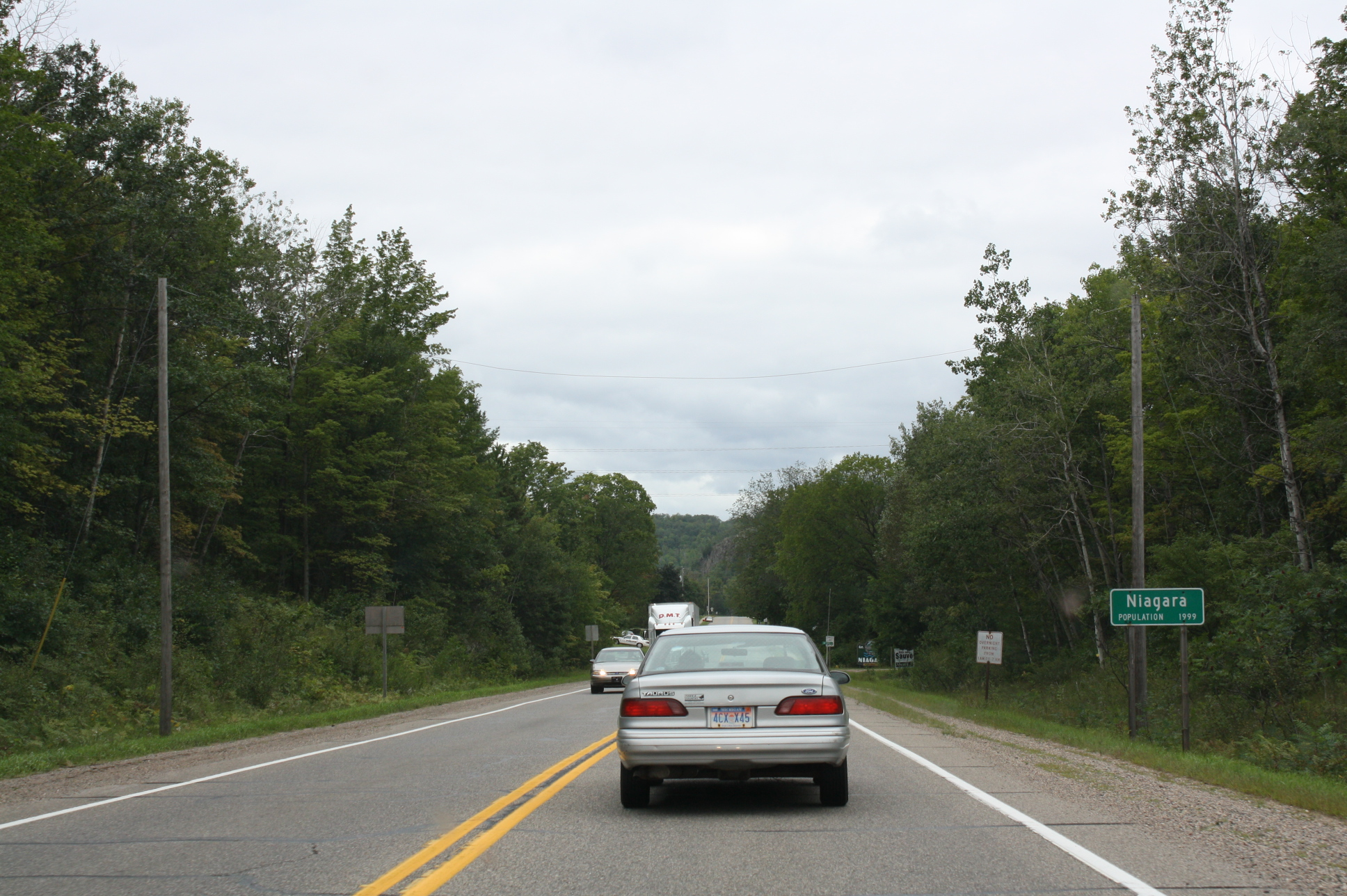
Sign

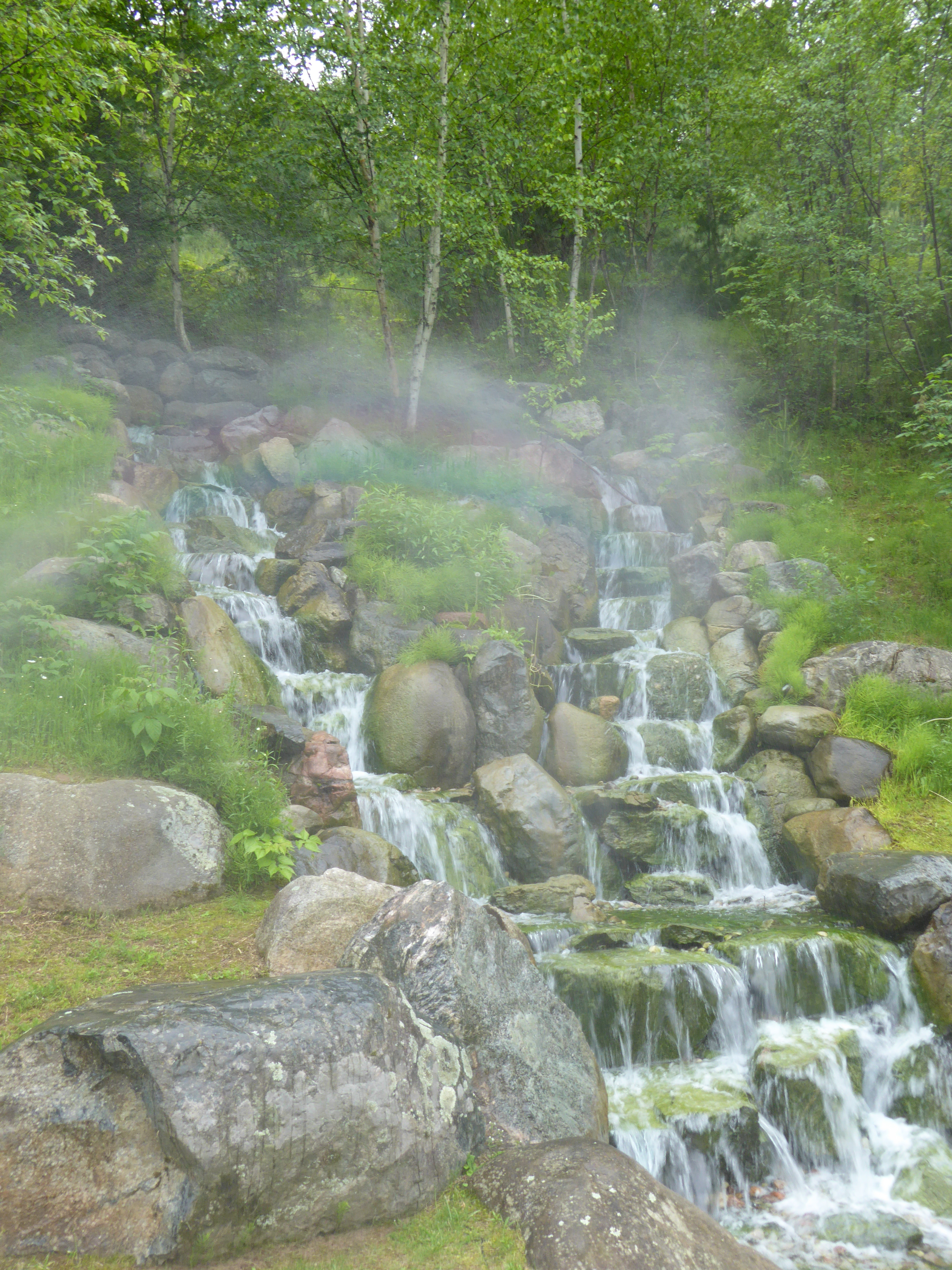
"Little Niagara Falls"
