= Fox Valley Catholic Conference =

Wisconsin high school athletic conference (1929-1971)

The Fox Valley Catholic Conference is a former high school athletic conference in northeastern Wisconsin. Founded in 1929, it was composed entirely of Catholic high schools and was succeeded by the Fox Valley Christian Conference in 1971. The conference and its member schools were affiliated with the Wisconsin Catholic Interscholastic Athletic Association from 1957 to 1968, and the Wisconsin Independent Schools Athletic Association from 1968 to 1971.

== History ==
=== 1929–1942 ===
Location of Original Fox Valley Catholic Conference Members

The Fox Valley Catholic Conference was formed in 1929 by seven parochial high schools within the Diocese of Green Bay: Cathedral in Green Bay, Our Lady of Lourdes in Marinette, St. John in Little Chute, St. Mary in Oshkosh, St. Mary Catholic in Neenah, St. Norbert in De Pere and St. Peter's in Oshkosh. Cathedral spent two seasons in the conference before leaving in 1931 to compete as an independent. St. Joseph of Marinette joined in 1932, but they only lasted one season in the conference before leaving. St. Mary left the Fox Valley Catholic Conference in 1935, but returned two years later, offsetting the loss of Our Lady of Lourdes in 1937. St. Joseph Indian School on the Menominee Indian reservation in Keshena joined the conference in 1939, and Our Lady of Lourdes and newcomers St. Mary's Springs joined the Fox Valley Catholic Conference in 1940. St. Mary's Springs was the only conference member not in the Green Bay diocese, as Fond du Lac County was part of the Archdiocese of Milwaukee. Green Bay Central Catholic joined the conference after opening in 1941, the same year that the two Catholic high schools in Oshkosh (St. Mary and St. Peter's) closed their doors.

=== 1942–1961 ===
In 1942, the Fox Valley Catholic Conference lost three additional members: Our Lady of Lourdes (for the second time), St. Joseph Indian and St. Mary's Springs. The conference continued with four active members for the next two years before Our Lady of Lourdes rejoined in 1944. St. Mary's Springs made their return in 1948, bringing membership back up to six schools. During the 1950s, several Fox Valley Catholic Conference schools went through name changes. Green Bay Central Catholic renamed itself Our Lady of Premontre when it was relocated from downtown to the west side of Green Bay in 1955, and two schools changed their names in 1959. Our Lady of Lourdes became Marinette Central Catholic when the city's Catholic schools were consolidated, and St. Norbert was changed to Abbot Pennings when it was moved into the old Nicolet High School building in De Pere.

=== 1961–1971 ===
Location of Final Fox Valley Catholic Conference Members

In 1961, membership in the Fox Valley Catholic Conference increased to eight schools with the addition of Lourdes Academy in Oshkosh and Xavier in Appleton. Roncalli High School in Manitowoc became the conference's ninth member in 1968 after a one-year stint in the WIAA's Kettle Moraine Conference. The conference continued with this lineup until it was ended in 1971, when the first non-Catholic member was accepted into the group (Fox Valley Lutheran in Appleton) and the new conference christened itself the Fox Valley Christian Conference in recognition.

== Conference membership history ==
=== Final members ===
School	Location	Affiliation	Mascot	Colors	Joined	Left	Conference Joined	Current Conference
Abbot Pennings	De Pere, WI	Private (Catholic, Norbertine)	Squires		1929	1971	Fox Valley Christian	Closed in 1990 (merged into Notre Dame Academy)
Lourdes Academy	Oshkosh, WI	Private (Catholic)	Knights		1961	1971	Fox Valley Christian	Trailways
Marinette Central Catholic	Marinette, WI	Private (Catholic)	Cavaliers		1929, 1940, 1944	1937, 1942, 1971	Fox Valley Christian	Marinette & Oconto
Our Lady of Premontre	Green Bay, WI	Private (Catholic)	Cadets		1955	1971	Fox Valley Christian	Closed in 1990 (merged into Notre Dame Academy)
St. John	Little Chute, WI	Private (Catholic)	Flying Dutchmen		1929	1971	Fox Valley Christian	Closed in 1973
Roncalli	Manitowoc, WI	Private (Catholic)	Jets		1968	1971	Fox Valley Christian	Eastern Wisconsin
St. Mary Catholic	Neenah, WI	Private (Catholic)	Zephyrs		1929	1971	Fox Valley Christian	Big East
St. Mary's Springs	Fond du Lac, WI	Private (Catholic)	Ledgers		1940, 1948	1942, 1971	Fox Valley Christian	Wisconsin Flyway
Xavier	Appleton, WI	Private (Catholic)	Hawks		1961	1971	Fox Valley Christian	Bay

=== Previous members ===
School	Location	Affiliation	Mascot	Colors	Joined	Left	Conference Joined	Current Conference
Cathedral	Green Bay, WI	Private (Catholic)	Bluegolds		1929	1931	Independent	Closed in 1941
Green Bay Central Catholic	Green Bay, WI	Private (Catholic)	Cadets		1941	1955	Relocated and changed name to Our Lady of Premontre	
St. Joseph	Marinette, WI	Private (Catholic)	Unknown	Unknown	1932	1933	Independent	Closed (date unknown)
St. Joseph Indian	Kesīqnæh, WI	Private (Catholic)	Indians		1939	1942	Independent	Closed in 1952
St. Mary	Oshkosh, WI	Private (Catholic)	Greyhounds		1929, 1937	1935, 1941	Closed	
St. Peter's	Oshkosh, WI	Private (Catholic)	Keymen		1929	1941	Closed	

== List of state champions ==
=== Fall sports ===
Boys Cross Country
School	Year	Organization	Division
Roncalli	1969	WISAA	Class B
Roncalli	1970	WISAA	Class B

Football
School	Year	Organization
Roncalli	1969	WISAA
Our Lady of Premontre	1970	WISAA

=== Winter sports ===
Boys Basketball
School	Year	Organization
St. Norbert	1957	WCIAA
St. Mary Catholic	1960	WCIAA
Xavier	1963	WCIAA
Marinette Catholic Central	1964	WCIAA

=== Spring sports ===
Boys Golf
School	Year	Organization
St. Mary's Springs	1959	WCIAA

Boys Tennis
School	Year	Organization
Xavier	1963	WCIAA (Note: Tied for championship with Catholic Memorial)

Boys Track & Field
School	Year	Organization	Division
Our Lady of Premontre	1969	WISAA	Class A
Lourdes Academy	1969	WISAA	Class B
Roncalli	1970	WISAA	Class B

== List of conference champions ==
=== Boys Basketball ===
School	Quantity	Years
St. Mary Catholic	18	1934, 1935, 1938, 1939, 1940, 1941, 1943, 1945, 1946, 1948, 1952, 1954, 1955, 1956, 1958, 1959, 1960, 1961
(St. Norbert); Abbot Pennings	12	1930, 1936, 1937, 1947, 1950, 1951, 1952, 1956, 1957, 1961, 1970, 1971
Xavier	8	1962, 1963, 1964, 1965, 1966, 1967, 1968, 1969
Green Bay Central Catholic	3	1949, 1950, 1953
St. John	2	1939, 1942
St. Peter's	2	1931, 1932
Lourdes Academy	1	1971
(Our Lady of Lourdes); Marinette Catholic Central	1	1933
Our Lady of Premontre	1	1958
Green Bay Cathedral	0	
Roncalli	0	
St. Joseph	0	
St. Joseph Indian	0	
St. Mary	0	
St. Mary's Springs	0	

=== Football ===
School	Quantity	Years
St. Mary Catholic	14	1931, 1933, 1934, 1937, 1938, 1939, 1942, 1943, 1944, 1955, 1956, 1958, 1960, 1968
St. John	12	1932, 1933, 1940, 1941, 1951, 1953, 1956, 1957, 1958, 1959, 1964, 1967
Xavier	7	1961, 1962, 1963, 1964, 1965, 1966, 1968
(St. Norbert); Abbot Pennings	6	1935, 1936, 1950, 1952, 1954, 1956
Green Bay Central Catholic	5	1945, 1946, 1947, 1948, 1949
Our Lady of Premontre	2	1968, 1970
Roncalli	1	1969
St. Peter's	1	1930
Lourdes Academy	0	
(Our Lady of Lourdes); Marinette Catholic Central	0	
St. Joseph Indian	0	
St. Mary's Springs	0	
