= Fox Valley Christian Conference =

Wisconsin high school athletic conference (1971-1999)

The Fox Valley Christian Conference is a former high school athletic conference in Wisconsin, consisting entirely of private schools in northeastern Wisconsin. Operational from 1971 to 1999, all of its member schools belonged to the Wisconsin Independent Schools Athletic Association.

== History ==
=== 1971–1993 ===
Location of Original Fox Valley Christian Conference Members

The Fox Valley Christian Conference was formed in 1971 when its predecessor, the Fox Valley Catholic Conference, accepted its first non-Catholic member (Fox Valley Lutheran High School in Appleton). The new conference made its debut with ten schools: Abbot Pennings in De Pere, Fox Valley Lutheran, Lourdes Academy in Oshkosh, Marinette Central Catholic, Our Lady of Premontre in Green Bay, Roncalli in Manitowoc, St. John in Little Chute, St. Mary Catholic in Neenah, St. Mary's Springs in Fond du Lac and Xavier in Appleton. All Catholic members of the conference with the exception of one were affiliated with the Green Bay diocese (St. Mary's Springs was part of the Milwaukee archdiocese). The conference accepted its first all-girls school when St. Joseph Academy in Green Bay joined in 1972. The next year, St. John High School left the conference when the school closed. Membership was stable for the next seventeen years until the three Catholic high schools in the Green Bay area (Pennings, Premontre and St. Joseph) merged into Notre Dame Academy in 1990. The new school inherited their predecessors' place in the Fox Valley Christian Conference. Manitowoc Lutheran would join the conference in 1991 to bring membership to nine schools.

=== 1993–1999 ===
Location of Final Fox Valley Christian Conference Members

In 1993, Notre Dame would move to the Fox River Valley Conference, a conference of public high schools sponsored by the Wisconsin Interscholastic Athletic Association. This turned out to be a harbinger of things to come, as in 1997, WISAA agreed to a merger with the WIAA to be finalized by the 2000-01 school year. The next year, the Fox Valley Christian Conference lost two schools to the Midwest Classic Conference: Lourdes Academy and St. Mary Catholic. The final six schools would play one more year before the conference disbanded in 1999. All member schools went on to join WIAA-sponsored conferences prior to the merger being final.

=== Football ===
The Fox Valley Christian Conference sponsored football for most of its history, with the membership roster mostly coinciding with the conference's full roster. Nine out of the conference's ten full members competed in the initial season with Fox Valley Lutheran joining in 1972. The next year, St. John left the conference after closing its doors, and by 1987 the FVCC was down to seven football-playing members with the departure of Marinette Catholic Central and St. Mary Catholic. The latter would return for the 1988 season, when the conference was divided by school size with three members (Fox Valley Lutheran, Roncalli and Xavier) carrying dual affiliation:

| Large Schools | Small Schools |
|---|---|
| Abbot Pennings | Fox Valley Lutheran |
| Fox Valley Lutheran | Lourdes Academy |
| Our Lady of Premontre | Roncalli |
| Roncalli | St. Mary Catholic |
| St. Mary's Springs | Xavier |
| Xavier | |

The Large Schools division experienced a net loss of one school in 1990 when Notre Dame Academy was created from the merger of Abbot Pennings and Our Lady of Premontre. Their stay would be short, leaving after only two seasons to compete as an independent before joining the Fox River Valley Conference in 1993. The five remaining schools (plus new members Manitowoc Lutheran, resumed competition as a single division in 1992. The membership ranks thinned to five schools for the 1996 season, with the FVCC losing Lourdes Academy to the Wisconsin Independent Football Association's Classic Division. This would also be the conference's last season, as four members (Fox Valley Lutheran, Manitowoc Lutheran, St. Mary's Springs and Xavier) joined with three former WIFA members (Edgewood, Luther Prep and Winnebago Lutheran) to form the Wisconsin Christian Football Conference.

== Conference membership history ==
=== Final members ===
| School | Location | Affiliation | Mascot | Colors | Joined | Left | Conference Joined | Current Conference |
|---|---|---|---|---|---|---|---|---|
| Fox Valley Lutheran | Appleton, WI | Private (WELS) | Foxes | | 1971 | 1999 | Valley 8 | Bay (2025) |
| Manitowoc Lutheran | Manitowoc, WI | Private (WELS) | Lancers | | 1991 | 1999 | Olympian | Big East |
| Marinette Central Catholic | Marinette, WI | Private (Catholic) | Cavaliers | | 1971 | 1999 | Marinette & Oconto | |
| Roncalli | Manitowoc, WI | Private (Catholic) | Jets | | 1971 | 1999 | Eastern Wisconsin | |
| St. Mary's Springs | Fond du Lac, WI | Private (Catholic) | Ledgers | | 1971 | 1999 | Flyway | Wisconsin Flyway |
| Xavier | Appleton, WI | Private (Catholic) | Hawks | | 1971 | 1999 | Valley 8 | Bay |

=== Previous members ===
| School | Location | Affiliation | Mascot | Colors | Joined | Left | Conference Joined | Current Conference |
|---|---|---|---|---|---|---|---|---|
| Abbot Pennings | De Pere, WI | Private (Catholic, Norbertine) | Squires | | 1971 | 1990 | Closed (merged into Notre Dame Academy) | |
| Lourdes Academy | Oshkosh, WI | Private (Catholic) | Knights | | 1971 | 1998 | Midwest Classic | Trailways |
| Notre Dame Academy | Green Bay, WI | Private (Catholic) | Tritons | | 1990 | 1993 | Fox River Valley | Fox River Classic |
| Our Lady of Premontre | Green Bay, WI | Private (Catholic) | Cadets | | 1971 | 1990 | Closed (merged into Notre Dame Academy) | |
| St. John | Little Chute, WI | Private (Catholic) | Flying Dutchmen | | 1971 | 1973 | Closed | |
| St. Joseph Academy | Green Bay, WI | Private (Catholic) | Sajoacs | | 1972 | 1990 | Closed (merged into Notre Dame Academy) | |
| St. Mary Catholic | Neenah, WI | Private (Catholic) | Zephyrs | | 1971 | 1998 | Midwest Classic | Big East |

== Membership timeline ==
=== Football members ===
Large Schools Small Schools Dual Affiliation

== List of state champions ==
=== Fall sports ===
Boys Cross Country
| School | Year | Organization | Division |
|---|---|---|---|
| St. Mary's Springs | 1971 | WISAA | Class B |
| Roncalli | 1973 | WISAA | Class B |
| Roncalli | 1976 | WISAA | Class B |
| Our Lady of Premontre | 1982 | WISAA | Class A |
| Our Lady of Premontre | 1983 | WISAA | Class A |

Girls Cross Country
| School | Year | Organization | Division |
|---|---|---|---|
| Notre Dame Academy | 1990 | WISAA | Class A |
| St. Mary's Springs | 1992 | WISAA | Division 2 |
| St. Mary's Springs | 1993 | WISAA | Division 2 |
| St. Mary's Springs | 1995 | WISAA | Division 2 |
| St. Mary's Springs | 1996 | WISAA | Division 2 |
| St. Mary's Springs | 1997 | WISAA | Division 2 |
| St. Mary's Springs | 1998 | WISAA | Division 2 |

Football
| School | Year | Organization | Division |
|---|---|---|---|
| Abbot Pennings | 1971 | WISAA | |
| Lourdes Academy | 1974 | WISAA | |
| Our Lady of Premontre | 1978 | WISAA | Class A |
| St. Mary's Springs | 1983 | WISAA | Class A |
| St. Mary's Springs | 1984 | WISAA | Class A |
| St. Mary's Springs | 1990 | WISAA | Division 1 |
| St. Mary's Springs | 1991 | WISAA | Division 1 |
| Notre Dame Academy | 1992 | WISAA | Division 1 |
| St. Mary's Springs | 1995 | WISAA | Division 1 |
| Roncalli | 1996 | WISAA | Division 2 |
| Roncalli | 1997 | WISAA | Division 2 |
| St. Mary's Springs | 1997 | WISAA | Division 3 |
| Roncalli | 1998 | WISAA | Division 3 |
| St. Mary's Springs | 1998 | WISAA | Division 2 |

Golf
| School | Year | Organization |
|---|---|---|
| Our Lady of Premontre | 1978 | WISAA |
| Our Lady of Premontre | 1979 | WISAA |
| Our Lady of Premontre | 1981 | WISAA |
| Our Lady of Premontre | 1985 | WISAA |
| Abbot Pennings | 1986 | WISAA |
| Abbot Pennings | 1987 | WISAA |
| Abbot Pennings | 1988 | WISAA |
| Notre Dame Academy | 1991 | WISAA |

Boys Soccer
| School | Year | Organization |
|---|---|---|
| Abbot Pennings | 1987 | WISAA |

Girls Tennis
| School | Year | Organization |
|---|---|---|
| St. Joseph Academy | 1981 | WISAA |

Volleyball
| School | Year | Organization | Division |
|---|---|---|---|
| St. Mary Catholic | 1981 | WISAA | Class B |
| St. Mary Catholic | 1982 | WISAA | Class B |
| Marinette Catholic Central | 1985 | WISAA | Class B |
| Marinette Catholic Central | 1986 | WISAA | Class B |
| Marinette Catholic Central | 1987 | WISAA | Class B |
| Marinette Catholic Central | 1990 | WISAA | Class B |
| Lourdes Academy | 1996 | WISAA | Division 2 |

=== Winter sports ===
Boys Basketball
| School | Year | Organization | Division |
|---|---|---|---|
| Our Lady of Premontre | 1982 | WISAA | Class A |
| Marinette Catholic Central | 1983 | WISAA | Class B |
| Abbot Pennings | 1990 | WISAA | Class A |
| St. Mary's Springs | 1993 | WISAA | Division 2 |
| St. Mary's Springs | 1994 | WISAA | Division 2 |
| Xavier | 1995 | WISAA | Division 1 |

Girls Basketball
| School | Year | Organization | Division |
|---|---|---|---|
| Roncalli | 1975 | WISAA | |
| Xavier | 1978 | WISAA | |
| Marinette Catholic Central | 1981 | WISAA | Class B |
| Marinette Catholic Central | 1982 | WISAA | Class B |
| Marinette Catholic Central | 1983 | WISAA | Class B |
| Marinette Catholic Central | 1984 | WISAA | Class B |
| Marinette Catholic Central | 1992 | WISAA | Division 3 |
| Marinette Catholic Central | 1993 | WISAA | Division 3 |
| Lourdes Academy | 1994 | WISAA | Division 2 |
| Marinette Catholic Central | 1994 | WISAA | Division 3 |
| Lourdes Academy | 1995 | WISAA | Division 2 |
| Marinette Catholic Central | 1995 | WISAA | Division 3 |
| Marinette Catholic Central | 1996 | WISAA | Division 3 |
| Marinette Catholic Central | 1997 | WISAA | Division 3 |
| St. Mary Catholic | 1998 | WISAA | Division 2 |

Wrestling
| School | Year | Organization |
|---|---|---|
| Lourdes Academy | 1993 | WISAA |
| Lourdes Academy | 1994 | WISAA |

=== Spring sports ===
Baseball
| School | Year | Organization | Division |
|---|---|---|---|
| Xavier | 1978 | WISAA | |
| Xavier | 1979 | WISAA | |
| Marinette Catholic Central | 1986 | WISAA | Class B |
| Marinette Catholic Central | 1987 | WISAA | Class B |
| St. Mary Catholic | 1990 | WISAA | Class B |
| Roncalli | 1991 | WISAA | Class A |

Golf
| School | Year | Organization |
|---|---|---|
| Roncalli | 1973 | WISAA |

Softball
| School | Year | Organization | Division |
|---|---|---|---|
| St. Joseph Academy | 1984 | WISAA | |
| St. Mary Catholic | 1986 | WISAA | Class B |
| St. Joseph Academy | 1987 | WISAA | Class A |
| St. Joseph Academy | 1988 | WISAA | Class A |
| St. Mary Catholic | 1990 | WISAA | Class B |
| Fox Valley Lutheran | 1998 | WISAA | Division 1 |

Boys Tennis
| School | Year | Organization |
|---|---|---|
| Abbot Pennings | 1987 | WISAA |

Boys Track & Field
| School | Year | Organization | Division |
|---|---|---|---|
| St. John | 1973 | WISAA | Class C |
| Roncalli | 1974 | WISAA | Class B |
| St. Mary's Springs | 1975 | WISAA | Class B |
| Lourdes Academy | 1976 | WISAA | Class B |
| Lourdes Academy | 1977 | WISAA | Class B |
| St. Mary's Springs | 1979 | WISAA | Class B |
| Our Lady of Premontre | 1980 | WISAA | Class A |
| Xavier | 1984 | WISAA | Class B |
| Xavier | 1985 | WISAA | Class B |
| Lourdes Academy | 1986 | WISAA | Class B |
| Lourdes Academy | 1987 | WISAA | Class B |
| Lourdes Academy | 1990 | WISAA | Class B |
| St. Mary's Springs | 1993 | WISAA | Division 2 |
| Roncalli | 1994 | WISAA | Division 2 |
| St. Mary's Springs | 1996 | WISAA | Division 2 |
| St. Mary's Springs | 1997 | WISAA | Division 2 |
| St. Mary's Springs | 1998 | WISAA | Division 2 |
| Manitowoc Lutheran | 1999 | WISAA | Division 2 |

Girls Track & Field
| School | Year | Organization | Division |
|---|---|---|---|
| Roncalli | 1975 | WISAA | |
| Fox Valley Lutheran | 1980 | WISAA | Class B |
| Fox Valley Lutheran | 1983 | WISAA | Class B |
| Lourdes Academy | 1988 | WISAA | Class B |
| Roncalli | 1990 | WISAA | Class B |
| Xavier | 1992 | WISAA | Division 2 |
| Manitowoc Lutheran | 1994 | WISAA | Division 2 |

== List of conference champions ==
=== Boys Basketball ===
| School | Quantity | Years |
|---|---|---|
| Xavier | 8 | 1979, 1980, 1981, 1989, 1992, 1994, 1996, 1997 |
| Our Lady of Premontre | 6 | 1976, 1977, 1978, 1982, 1985, 1988 |
| Abbot Pennings | 5 | 1972, 1973, 1974, 1987, 1990 |
| Lourdes Academy | 3 | 1983, 1984, 1992 |
| St. Mary Catholic | 3 | 1975, 1986, 1987 |
| Manitowoc Lutheran | 2 | 1998, 1999 |
| Notre Dame Academy | 2 | 1991, 1992 |
| Roncalli | 2 | 1974, 1983 |
| Fox Valley Lutheran | 1 | 1995 |
| St. Mary's Springs | 1 | 1993 |
| Marinette Catholic Central | 0 | |
| St. John | 0 | |

=== Girls Basketball ===
| School | Quantity | Years |
|---|---|---|
| Xavier | 11 | 1977, 1978, 1979, 1980, 1983, 1985, 1986, 1987, 1988, 1993, 1999 |
| Marinette Catholic Central | 3 | 1984, 1992, 1994 |
| St. Joseph Academy | 3 | 1981, 1982, 1984 |
| Fox Valley Lutheran | 2 | 1998, 1999 |
| Lourdes Academy | 2 | 1990, 1995 |
| Roncalli | 2 | 1989, 1997 |
| Notre Dame Academy | 1 | 1991 |
| St. Mary Catholic | 1 | 1996 |
| Manitowoc Lutheran | 0 | |
| St. Mary's Springs | 0 | |

=== Football ===
| School | Quantity | Years |
|---|---|---|
| St. Mary's Springs | 18 | 1975, 1976, 1977, 1978, 1981, 1983, 1985, 1986, 1987, 1988, 1989, 1990, 1991, 1992, 1993, 1994, 1995, 1996 |
| Abbot Pennings | 6 | 1971, 1972, 1977, 1979, 1982, 1985 |
| Our Lady of Premontre | 6 | 1973, 1974, 1977, 1978, 1984, 1985 |
| Fox Valley Lutheran | 3 | 1988, 1990, 1991 |
| Roncalli | 3 | 1980, 1988, 1989 |
| Xavier | 1 | 1988 |
| Lourdes Academy | 0 | |
| Manitowoc Lutheran | 0 | |
| Marinette Catholic Central | 0 | |
| Notre Dame Academy | 0 | |
| St. John | 0 | |
| St. Mary Catholic | 0 | |
