= List of schools in the Roman Catholic Diocese of Green Bay =

The following is a list of Catholic educational institutions located within the Roman Catholic Diocese of Green Bay:

== Colleges and universities ==
School	City	County
St. Norbert College	De Pere	Brown

== Secondary schools ==
School	School System	City	County
Chesterton Academy of St. John Paul II Classical School	GRACE	Green Bay	Brown
Lourdes	Lourdes Academy	Oshkosh	Winnebago
Notre Dame de la Baie Academy		Green Bay	Brown
Roncalli	Roncalli	Manitowoc	Manitowoc
St Francis Xavier	Xavier	Appleton	Outagamie
St Mary Catholic	SMC	Neenah	Winnebago
St Thomas Aquinas Academy	STAA	Marinette	Marinette
St. Ignatius Chesterton Academy	St. Ignatius Catholic School	Kaukauna	Outagamie

== Primary schools ==
School	School System	City	County
Middle Schools
Roncalli	Roncalli	Manitowoc	Manitowoc
Seton	TCCES	Menasha	Winnebago
St John Neumann	UCS	Oshkosh	Winnebago
St Joseph	ACES	Appleton	Outagamie
St Thomas Aquinas Academy	STAA	Marinette	Marinette
St. Ignatius Catholic School	St. Ignatius Catholic School	Kaukauna	Outagamie
Grade Schools
All Saints		Antigo	Langlade
All Saints		Denmark	Brown
Divine Savior		Kiel / New Holstein	Manitowoc
Father Allouez - Resurrection site	GRACE	Green Bay	Brown
Holy Cross	GRACE	Bay Settlement	Brown
St. Ignatius Catholic School	St. Ignatius Catholic School	Kaukauna	Outagamie
Holy Family		Brillion	Calumet
Holy Family	GRACE	Green Bay	Brown
Holy Rosary		Kewaunee	Kewaunee
Holy Spirit		Darboy	Outagamie
Holy Trinity		Casco	Kewaunee
Notre Dame of De Pere	GRACE	De Pere	Brown
Our Lady of Lourdes	GRACE	De Pere	Brown
Sacred Heart		Shawano	Shawano
St. Bernard	GRACE	Green Bay	Brown
St Gregory		St Nazianz	Manitowoc
St John Bosco		Sturgeon Bay	Door
St John Nepomucene		Little Chute	Outagamie
St. John Paul II Classical	GRACE	Green Bay	Brown
St John / Sacred Heart		Sherwood / St John	Calumet
St John the Baptist	GRACE	Howard	Brown
St Mary		Algoma	Kewaunee
St. Mary		Greenville	Outagamie
St Mary		Luxemburg	Kewaunee
St Mary / St Michael		Clarks Mills	Manitowoc
St Nicholas		Freedom	Outagamie
St Paul		Wrightstown	Brown
St Thomas More	GRACE	Green Bay	Brown
Elementary Schools
Assumption of the Blessed Virgin Mary		Pulaski	Brown
Catholic Central	ACES	Appleton	Outagamie
Chilton Area		Chilton	Calumet
Father Allouez - St. Matthew site	GRACE	Green Bay	Brown
Most Precious Blood		New London	Waupaca
Roncalli		Manitowoc	Manitowoc
St Anthony		Oconto Falls	Oconto
St Bernadette	ACES	Appleton	Outagamie
St Edward		Mackville	Outagamie
St Elizabeth Ann Seton	UCS	Oshkosh	Winnebago
St Francis Cabrini	UCS	Oshkosh	Winnebago
St Gabriel	TCCES	Neenah	Winnebago
St. Ignatius Catholic School	St. Ignatius Catholic School	Kaukauna	Outagamie
St Margaret Mary	TCCES	Neenah	Winnebago
St Mary		Greenleaf	Brown
St Mary		Hilbert	Calumet
St Mary	TCCES	Menasha	Winnebago
St Pius X	ACES	Appleton	Outagamie
St Rose / St Mary		Clintonville	Waupaca
St Thomas Aquinas Academy	STAA	Peshtigo	Marinette
St Thomas More	ACES	Appleton	Outagamie

== School systems ==
System	City	County
Appleton Catholic Education System (ACES)	Appleton	Outagamie
Green Bay Area Catholic Education System (GRACE)	Green Bay Metro	Brown
Roncalli Catholic Schools	Manitowoc	Manitowoc
St. Ignatius Catholic School	Kaukauna	Outagamie
St Thomas Aquinas Academies	Marinette & Peshtigo	Marinette
Twin Cities Catholic Education System	Menasha & Neenah	Winnebago
Unified Catholic Schools	Oshkosh	Winnebago
