= Wisconsin Christian Football Conference =

Wisconsin high school football conference (1997-1998)

The Wisconsin Christian Football Conference is a former high school football conference in Wisconsin. Composed entirely of private schools, the conference lasted for only two seasons (1997–1998) and all of its member schools belonged to the Wisconsin Independent Schools Athletic Association.

== History ==
Location of Wisconsin Christian Football Conference members

The Wisconsin Christian Football Conference was formed in 1997 by seven private high schools in Wisconsin: Edgewood, Fox Valley Lutheran, Luther Prep, Manitowoc Lutheran, St. Mary's Springs, Winnebago Lutheran and Xavier. All seven schools previously belonged to the Wisconsin Independent Football Association, a football-only conference associated with WISAA and were preparing to transition into Wisconsin Interscholastic Athletic Association membership by the 2000-01 school year. Four schools were affiliated with the Fox Valley Christian Division (Fox Valley Lutheran, Manitowoc Lutheran, St. Mary's Springs and Xavier) and three were members of the WIFA Midwest Division (Edgewood, Luther Prep and Winnebago Lutheran). The conference was expected to be a stopgap before its members found affiliations with existing WIAA-member conferences and only lasted for two seasons. Luther Prep joined the Parkland Conference after the 1997 season and the remaining six schools disbanded the conference at the conclusion of the 1998 season. Most of the schools' new affiliations were for all sports: Fox Valley Lutheran and Xavier became members of the new Valley 8 Conference, Edgewood joined the Badger Conference, Manitowoc Lutheran entered the Olympian Conference and Winnebago Lutheran was accepted into the Flyway Conference. St. Mary's Springs also joined the Flyway Conference but became football-only members of the original East Central Conference before its merger with the Flyway Conference in 2001.

== Conference membership history ==
School	Location	Affiliation	Mascot	Colors	Seasons	Primary Conference
Edgewood	Madison, WI	Private (Catholic)	Crusaders		1997–1998	Independent
Fox Valley Lutheran	Appleton, WI	Private (Lutheran, WELS)	Foxes		1997–1998	Fox Valley Christian
Luther Prep	Watertown, WI	Private (Lutheran, WELS)	Phoenix		1997	Midwest Classic
Manitowoc Lutheran	Manitowoc, WI	Private (Lutheran, WELS)	Lancers		1997–1998	Fox Valley Christian
St. Mary's Springs	Fond du Lac, WI	Private (Catholic)	Ledgers		1997–1998	Fox Valley Christian
Winnebago Lutheran	Fond du Lac, WI	Private (Lutheran, WELS)	Vikings		1997–1998	Midwest Classic
Xavier	Appleton, WI	Private (Catholic)	Hawks		1997–1998	Fox Valley Christian

== List of state champions ==
School	Year	Organization	Division
St. Mary's Springs	1997	WISAA	Division 3
St. Mary's Springs	1998	WISAA	Division 2

== List of conference champions ==
School	Quantity	Years
Luther Prep	1	1997
St. Mary's Springs	1	1998
Edgewood	0	
Fox Valley Lutheran	0	
Manitowoc Lutheran	0	
Winnebago Lutheran	0	
Xavier	0	
