= Eastern Wisconsin Conference =

Wisconsin high school athletic conference

dThe Eastern Wisconsin Conference is a high school athletic conference with its membership based in east central Wisconsin. It existed in two incarnations: the original conference from 1923 to 1970 and the current one since 1979. The conference and its member schools belong to the Wisconsin Interscholastic Athletic Association.

== History ==
=== 1923–1930 ===
Location of Original Eastern Wisconsin Conference Members (1923)

The Eastern Wisconsin Conference, originally known as the Big Eight High School Athletic Conference, was founded in 1923 by eight small high schools in the area between Lake Michigan and Lake Winnebago in east central Wisconsin (Brillion, Chilton, Elkhart Lake, Hilbert, Kiel, New Holstein, Plymouth and Sheboygan Falls). Original member schools were located in three counties: Calumet, Manitowoc and Sheboygan. After the conference's first season of competition, three schools (Brillion, Elkhart Lake and Hilbert) were dropped from the membership roster. Elkhart Lake rejoined the conference in 1925 to bring membership back up to six schools. A seventh member school was added when Valders joined the Big Eight in 1928, and Kohler brought the ledger back to eight members when they entered the league in 1929.

=== 1930–1948 ===
In 1930, three football-playing members of the Big Eight (Chilton, Plymouth and Sheboygan Falls) began to discuss the formation of a football conference. The Eastern Wisconsin Conference adopted its official moniker in 1935, and started eleven-man football competition the next year with Chilton, Kiel, Plymouth and Sheboygan Falls. A division for six-man football was formed in 1938, and its original members were New Holstein, Sheboygan Falls and Valders. Kohler joined in 1941 when they started their six-man football program, which is the same year that the eleven-man division stopped keeping records. In 1948, the decision was made by six of the eight conference members to transition to eleven-man football with six members (Chilton, Kiel, New Holstein, Plymouth, Sheboygan Falls and Valders) participating. Elkhart Lake and Kohler elected to continue as six-man programs and did not remain as football members.

=== 1948–1970 ===
After the initial membership shuffle, the Eastern Wisconsin Conference maintained a steady membership roster for over two decades for most of their sports. Original conference member Brillion rejoined the EWC in 1951 after moving over from the Little Nine Conference. The Eastern Wisconsin Conference increased to ten members in 1960, adding Oostburg to its membership roster. In 1965, Brillion rejoined the Little Nine Conference, with their place being taken by former Kettle Moraine Conference members Cedar Grove. In football, Kohler and Elkhart Lake-Glenbeulah joined the EWC after moving to eleven-man football in 1960 and 1964, respectively. Five schools left the conference in 1969; four became charter members of the Central Lakeshore Conference (Cedar Grove, Elkhart Lake-Glenbeulah, Kohler and Oostburg) and Chilton competed as an independent after completion of the 1969 football season. The EWC disbanded at the end of the 1969-1970 school year, with members dispersed to two new conferences. Five schools joined the Packerland Conference (Chilton, Kiel, New Holstein, Plymouth and Sheboygan Falls) and Valders accepted membership in the Olympian Conference.

=== 1979-present ===
Location of Original Eastern Wisconsin Conference Members (1979)

The Eastern Wisconsin Conference was reformed in 1979 by six of the previous members (Chilton, Kiel, New Holstein, Plymouth, Sheboygan Falls and Valders) along with newcomers Two Rivers. The six previous members all left the conferences that were previously joined in 1970, and Two Rivers came over from the Fox Valley Association. Valders only stayed in the new EWC for one season, rejoining the Olympian Conference in 1980. Kewaskum joined the Eastern Wisconsin Conference as their replacement after being left without conference affiliation following the dissolution of the Scenic Moraine Conference. This alignment stayed intact for nearly two decades, until in 1999, Chilton left to become members of the Olympian Conference. Campbellsport moved over from the Flyway Conference and Roncalli joined from the Fox Valley Christian Conference as their replacements. Roncalli's entry into the league coincided with the merger between the WIAA and the Wisconsin Independent Schools Athletic Association, and they became the first private school affiliated with the EWC. Roncalli's affiliation would last until 2007, when they accepted membership in the Olympian Conference and Waupun joined from the East Central Flyway Conference to keep the roster at eight schools. The most recent change to conference membership came in 2015, when the Eastern Wisconsin Conference lost four members (Campbellsport, Kewaskum, Plymouth and Waupun) to the revival of the East Central Conference. They were replaced by four schools displaced by the ceasing of the Olympian Conference. Chilton, Roncalli and Valders made their return to the EWC, along with Brillion, who were members of the original conference from 1951 to 1965.

=== Football-only alignment ===
In February 2019, in conjunction with the Wisconsin Football Coaches Association, the WIAA released a sweeping football-only realignment for Wisconsin to commence with the 2020 football season and run on a two-year cycle. Seven members of the Eastern Wisconsin Conference were carried over into the football conference (Brillion, Chilton, Kiel, New Holstein, Roncalli, Two Rivers and Valders) and the Kohler/Sheboygan Lutheran/Sheboygan Christian (KLC) football cooperative was brought over from the Big East Conference. This alignment remained in place for the 2022-2023 realignment cycle. For the 2024-2025 cycle, Two Rivers was realigned to the North Eastern Conference for football, and St. Mary Catholic in Neenah took their place after moving from the Trailways Conference. The Eastern Wisconsin Conference will swamp members with the North Eastern Conference for the 2026-2027 cycle, with Two Rivers making their return and the KLC football cooperative taking their place in the NEC.

== List of conference members (1979-present) ==
=== Current full members ===
| School | Location | Affiliation | Enrollment | Mascot | Colors | Joined |
|---|---|---|---|---|---|---|
| Brillion | Brillion, WI | Public | 314 | Lions | | 2015 |
| Chilton (Note: Left the Eastern Wisconsin Conference in 1999, returned in 2015) | Chilton, WI | Public | 349 | Tigers | | 1979, 2015 |
| Kiel | Kiel, WI | Public | 389 | Raiders | | 1979 |
| New Holstein | New Holstein, WI | Public | 326 | Huskies | | 1979 |
| Roncalli (Note: Left the Eastern Wisconsin Conference in 2007, returned in 2015) | Manitowoc, WI | Private (Catholic) | 215 | Jets | | 1999, 2015 |
| Sheboygan Falls | Sheboygan Falls, WI | Public | 477 | Falcons | | 1979 |
| Two Rivers | Two Rivers, WI | Public | 511 | Purple Raiders | | 1979 |
| Valders (Note: Left the Eastern Wisconsin Conference in 1980, returned in 2015) | Valders, WI | Public | 278 | Vikings | | 1979, 2015 |

=== Current associate members ===
| School | Location | Affiliation | Mascot | Colors | Primary Conference | Sport(s) |
|---|---|---|---|---|---|---|
| Berlin | Berlin, WI | Public | Indians | | South Central | Boys Swim & Dive, (Note: Co-operative with Green Lake) Girls Swim & Dive |
| Howards Grove | Howards Grove, WI | Public | Tigers | | Big East | Boys Tennis, (Note: Co-operative with Sheboygan Christian) Girls Tennis (Note: Co-operative with Elkhart Lake-Glenbeulah) |
| Kohler | Kohler, WI | Public | Blue Bombers | | Big East | Girls Swim & Dive (Note: Co-operative with Sheboygan Falls and Sheboygan Lutheran), Boys Tennis, Girls Tennis |
| Lourdes Academy | Oshkosh, WI | Private (Catholic) | Knights | | Trailways | Girls Tennis |
| Ripon | Ripon, WI | Public | Tigers | | South Central | Boys Tennis, Girls Tennis |
| Sheboygan Christian | Sheboygan, WI | Private (Non-denominational Christian) | Eagles | | Big East | Boys Swim & Dive, Girls Swim & Dive |
| St. Mary Catholic | Neenah, WI | Private (Catholic) | Zephyrs | | Big East | Football, Boys Tennis, Girls Tennis |
| Waupun | Waupun, WI | Public | Warriors | | Capitol | Boys Tennis |

=== Former full members ===
| School | Location | Affiliation | Mascot | Colors | Joined | Left | Conference Joined | Current Conference |
|---|---|---|---|---|---|---|---|---|
| Campbellsport | Campbellsport, WI | Public | Cougars | | 1999 | 2015 | East Central | Wisconsin Flyway |
| Kewaskum | Kewaskum, WI | Public | Indians | | 1980 | 2015 | East Central | Glacier Trails |
| Plymouth | Plymouth, WI | Public | Panthers | | 1979 | 2015 | East Central | Glacier Trails |
| Waupun | Waupun, WI | Public | Warriors | | 2007 | 2015 | East Central | Capitol |

== Conference membership history (1923–1970) ==
=== Final members ===
| School | Location | Affiliation | Mascot | Colors | Joined | Left | Conference Joined | Current Conference |
|---|---|---|---|---|---|---|---|---|
| Kiel | Kiel, WI | Public | Raiders | | 1923 | 1970 | Packerland | Eastern Wisconsin |
| New Holstein | New Holstein, WI | Public | Huskies | | 1923 | 1970 | Packerland | Eastern Wisconsin |
| Plymouth | Plymouth, WI | Public | Panthers | | 1923 | 1970 | Packerland | Glacier Trails |
| Sheboygan Falls | Sheboygan Falls, WI | Public | Falcons | | 1923 | 1970 | Packerland | Eastern Wisconsin |
| Valders | Valders, WI | Public | Vikings | | 1928 | 1970 | Olympian | Eastern Wisconsin |

=== Previous members ===
| School | Location | Affiliation | Mascot | Colors | Joined | Left | Conference Joined | Current Conference |
|---|---|---|---|---|---|---|---|---|
| Brillion | Brillion, WI | Public | Lions | | 1923, 1951 | 1924, 1965 | Independent, Little Nine | Eastern Wisconsin |
| Cedar Grove | Cedar Grove, WI | Public | Rockets | | 1965 | 1969 | Central Lakeshore | Big East |
| Chilton | Chilton, WI | Public | Tigers | | 1923 | 1969 | Independent | Eastern Wisconsin |
| Elkhart Lake-Glenbeulah | Elkhart Lake, WI | Public | Resorters | | 1923, 1925 | 1924, 1969 | Independent, Central Lakeshore | Big East |
| Hilbert | Hilbert, WI | Public | Wolves | | 1923 | 1924 | Independent | Big East |
| Kohler | Kohler WI | Public | Blue Bombers | | 1929 | 1969 | Central Lakeshore | Big East |
| Oostburg | Oostburg, WI | Public | Dutchmen | | 1960 | 1969 | Central Lakeshore | Big East |

=== Football-only members ===
| School | Location | Affiliation | Mascot | Colors | Seasons | Primary Conference |
|---|---|---|---|---|---|---|
| Chilton | Chilton, WI | Public | Tigers | | 1969 | Independent |

== Membership timeline ==
=== 1923-1970 ===
==== Football members ====
11-Man Division 6-Man Division

== Membership map ==
Eastern Wisconsin Conference
Location of Eastern Wisconsin Conference full members:
1 Brillion
2 Chilton
3 Kiel
4 New Holstein
5 Roncalli
6 Sheboygan Falls
7 Two Rivers
8 Valders

== Sponsored sports ==
| | Baseball | Boys Basketball | Girls Basketball | Boys Cross Country | Girls Cross Country | Football | Boys Golf | Boys Soccer (Note: Co-sponsored with the Big East Conference) | Girls Soccer | Softball | Boys Swim & Dive | Girls Swim & Dive | Boys Tennis | Girls Tennis | Boys Track & Field | Girls Track & Field | Girls Volleyball | Boys Wrestling | Girls Wrestling |
|---|---|---|---|---|---|---|---|---|---|---|---|---|---|---|---|---|---|---|---|
| Brillion | ● | ● | ● | ● | ● | ● | ● | | | ● | | | | | ● | ● | ● | ● | ● |
| Chilton | ● | ● | ● | ● | ● | ● | ● (Note: Co-operative with Hilbert) | | | ● | ● (Note: Co-operative with Brillion and Valders) | ● | | | ● | ● | ● | ● | ● |
| Kiel | ● | ● | ● | ● | ● | ● | ● | ● | ● | ● | ● (Note: Co-operative with Elkhart Lake-Glenbeulah) | ● | | ● | ● | ● | ● | ● | ● |
| New Holstein | ● | ● | ● | ● | ● | ● | ● | ● (Note: Co-operative with Brillion) | ● | ● | | | | | ● | ● | ● | ● | ● |
| Roncalli | ● | ● | ● | ● | ● | ● | ● | ● | ● (Note: Co-operative with Two Rivers) | ● | | | ● (Note: Co-operative with Manitowoc Lutheran) | ● | ● | ● | ● | | |
| Sheboygan Falls | ● | ● | ● | ● | ● | | ● | ● | ● | ● (Note: Co-operative with Kohler) | | | ● | ● | ● | ● | ● | ● | ● |
| Two Rivers | ● | ● | ● | ● | ● | ● | ● | | | ● | ● (Note: Co-operative with Roncalli) | ● | ● | | ● | ● | ● | ● | ● |
| Valders | ● | ● | ● | ● | ● | ● | ● | | ● | ● | | | | | ● | ● | ● | ● | ● |

== List of state champions ==
=== Fall sports ===
Boys Cross Country
| School | Year | Division |
|---|---|---|
| Two Rivers | 1999 | Division 2 |
| Valders | 2017 | Division 2 |
| Valders | 2018 | Division 2 |
| Valders | 2019 | Division 2 |
| Valders | 2021 | Division 2 |

Girls Cross Country
| School | Year | Division |
|---|---|---|
| Chilton | 1996 | Division 2 |

Football
| School | Year | Division |
|---|---|---|
| Two Rivers | 1980 | Division 3 |
| Two Rivers | 1981 | Division 3 |
| Two Rivers | 1982 | Division 3 |
| Sheboygan Falls | 2000 | Division 3 |

Boys Soccer
| School | Year | Division |
|---|---|---|
| Plymouth | 2002 | Division 2 |
| Roncalli/ Two Rivers | 2020 | Division 2 |

Girls Volleyball
| School | Year | Division |
|---|---|---|
| Sheboygan Falls | 1983 | Class B |
| Waupun | 2008 | Division 2 |

=== Winter sports ===
Boys Basketball
| School | Year | Division |
|---|---|---|
| Chilton | 1986 | Class B |
| Roncalli | 2018 | Division 4 |
| Roncalli | 2022 | Division 4 |
| Brillion | 2023 | Division 3 |

Girls Basketball
| School | Year | Division |
|---|---|---|
| Chilton | 1992 | Division 3 |

Boys Wrestling
| School | Year | Division |
|---|---|---|
| Valders | 1957 | Single Division |

=== Spring sports ===
Boys Golf
| School | Year | Division |
|---|---|---|
| Roncalli | 2009 | Division 3 |

Girls Soccer
| School | Year | Division |
|---|---|---|
| New Holstein | 2010 | Division 3 |
| Kiel | 2023 | Division 4 |

Boys Tennis
| School | Year | Division |
|---|---|---|
| Roncalli | 2000 | WISAA |

Boys Track & Field
| School | Year | Division |
|---|---|---|
| Kohler | 1946 | Class C |
| Kohler | 1947 | Class C |
| Kohler | 1948 | Class C |
| Kohler | 1950 | Class C |
| Kohler | 1951 | Class C |
| Kohler | 1953 | Class C |
| New Holstein | 1955 | Class C |
| New Holstein | 1956 | Class C |
| Kohler | 1958 | Class C |
| Kohler | 1965 | Class C |
| Kohler | 1967 | Class C |
| Plymouth | 1967 | Class B |
| Kohler | 1968 | Class C |

Girls Track & Field
| School | Year | Division |
|---|---|---|
| Two Rivers | 1994 | Division 2 |
| Two Rivers | 2000 | Division 2 |
| Two Rivers | 2003 | Division 2 |

=== Summer sports ===
Baseball
| School | Year | Division |
|---|---|---|
| New Holstein | 1965 | Single Division |
| Plymouth | 1982 | Single Division |

== List of conference champions ==
=== Boys Basketball ===
| School | Quantity | Years |
|---|---|---|
| Plymouth | 20 | 1938, 1940, 1948, 1949, 1958, 1961, 1970, 1982, 1986, 1987, 1990, 1994, 1995, 1997, 1998, 2008, 2009, 2012, 2013, 2014 |
| New Holstein | 17 | 1927, 1928, 1929, 1953, 1954, 1955, 1956, 1957, 1965, 1966, 1980, 1981, 1984, 1985, 2003, 2017, 2018 |
| Two Rivers | 13 | 1981, 1983, 1986, 1988, 1989, 1990, 1991, 1992, 1993, 1996, 1997, 2001, 2011 |
| Valders | 13 | 1930, 1931, 1934, 1937, 1941, 1944, 1945, 1946, 1947, 1963, 1964, 2016, 2018 |
| Kiel | 10 | 1926, 1931, 1933, 1936, 1960, 1968, 1987, 1992, 2002, 2024 |
| Sheboygan Falls | 10 | 1927, 1932, 1935, 1948, 1962, 1963, 1967, 1984, 2004, 2020 |
| Roncalli | 9 | 1999, 2000, 2005, 2006, 2007, 2019, 2021, 2022, 2025 |
| Kohler | 7 | 1942, 1943, 1950, 1951, 1952, 1958, 1969 |
| Brillion | 3 | 1962, 2023, 2026 |
| Waupun | 3 | 2009, 2010, 2015 |
| Chilton | 2 | 1939, 1959 |
| Elkhart Lake | 1 | 1934 |
| Cedar Grove | 0 | |
| Campbellsport | 0 | |
| Hilbert | 0 | |
| Kewaskum | 0 | |
| Oostburg | 0 | |

=== Girls Basketball ===
| School | Quantity | Years |
|---|---|---|
| Two Rivers | 16 | 1981, 1982, 1986, 1988, 1989, 1994, 1995, 1996, 1997, 1999, 2000, 2001, 2003, 2005, 2008, 2014 |
| Plymouth | 9 | 1980, 1983, 1984, 1985, 1986, 1987, 1990, 1998, 2011 |
| Sheboygan Falls | 6 | 1983, 2008, 2010, 2013, 2024, 2025 |
| Roncalli | 4 | 2002, 2004, 2007, 2016 |
| Valders | 4 | 2017, 2018, 2019, 2020 |
| Brillion | 3 | 2021, 2022, 2023 |
| Campbellsport | 3 | 2006, 2007, 2009 |
| Chilton | 3 | 1991, 1992, 1993 |
| Waupun | 3 | 2012, 2014, 2015 |
| Kiel | 2 | 2015, 2026 |
| New Holstein | 2 | 1989, 1990 |
| Kewaskum | 0 | |

=== Football ===
| School | Quantity | Years |
|---|---|---|
| Plymouth | 22 | 1948, 1950, 1951, 1956, 1957, 1962, 1964, 1965, 1989, 1991, 1994, 1995, 1996, 2003, 2004, 2006, 2009, 2010, 2011, 2012, 2013, 2014 |
| Sheboygan Falls | 17 | 1952, 1953, 1961, 1987, 1988, 1990, 1992, 1993, 1997, 1999, 2000, 2001, 2002, 2004, 2015, 2016, 2017 |
| New Holstein | 11 | 1938, 1940, 1954, 1955, 1958, 1959, 1960, 1963, 1965, 1997, 1998 |
| Two Rivers | 10 | 1979, 1980, 1981, 1982, 1985, 1986, 1989, 1990, 2022, 2023 |
| Kohler | 8 | 1941, 1942, 1943, 1944, 1945, 1946, 1947, 1967 |
| Chilton | 7 | 1936, 1937, 1939, 1941, 1951, 1966, 1969 |
| Kiel | 7 | 1938, 1940, 1984, 1989, 2018, 2019, 2024 |
| Kewaskum | 5 | 2001, 2005, 2006, 2007, 2008 |
| Valders | 5 | 1942, 1943, 1944, 1949, 1968 |
| Brillion | 4 | 2020, 2021, 2025, 2026 |
| Campbellsport | 3 | 1999, 2001, 2002 |
| Roncalli | 1 | 2025 |
| St. Mary Catholic | 1 | 2026 |
| Cedar Grove | 0 | |
| Elkhart Lake-Glenbeulah | 0 | |
| KLC | 0 | |
| Oostburg | 0 | |
| Waupun | 0 | |
Champions from 1939 6-Man Division unknown
