= John Thome =

John Thome may refer to:

- John M. Thome, American-Argentine astronomer
- John Thome (American football), American football and baseball coach
