= John Thome (American football) =

American football and baseball coach (1942–2011)

Andy Anderson
Biographical details
- Born: January 8, 1942; Port Washington, Wisconsin, U.S.
- Died: November 4, 2011 (aged 69); Wauwatosa, Wisconsin, U.S.

Playing career

Football
- 1960–1963: Oshkosh State

Basketball
- 1960–1961: Oshkosh State
- 1962–1964: Oshkosh State

Baseball
- 1961: Oshkosh State
- 1963–1964: Oshkosh State
- Positions: Quarterback, fullback, halfback, defensive back (football)

Coaching career (HC unless noted)

Football
- 1964: Chilton HS (WI) (assistant)
- 1965–1966: Chilton HS (WI)
- 1967–1980: Lakeland
- 1982–1983: Illinois Benedictine (DC)
- 1986–1993: Howards Grove HS (WI) (assistant)
- 1994: Plymouth HS (WI) (assistant)
- 1995: Oostburg HS (WI)
- 1996–1997: Kiel HS (WI) (DC)

Basketball
- 1964–1965: Chilton HS (WI) (assistant)
- 1965–1967: Chilton HS (WI)

Baseball
- 1972: Lakeland
- 1977–1980: Lakeland

Head coaching record
- Overall: 77–54–2 (college football)

Accomplishments and honors

Championships
- Football; 6 Gateway (1967–1971, 1974); 1 IBFC (1979)

Awards
- Football; IBFC Coach of the Year (1979)

John D. Thome (January 8, 1942 – November 4, 2011) was an American football and baseball coach. He served as the head football coach at Lakeland College—known now as Lakeland University—in Plymouth, Wisconsin from 1967 to 1980, compiling a record of 77–54–2. Thome was also the head baseball coach at Lakeland in 1972 and from 1977 to 1980.

Thome was born on January 8, 1942, in Port Washington, Wisconsin, to Rosalia Horn Thome and Wilfred N. Thome. He graduated from Port Washington High School in 1960 and attended Oshkosh State College—now known as the University of Wisconsin–Oshkosh—where he lettered in football, basketball, and baseball. Thomas played football for years at Oshkosh State at a number of positions: quarterback, fullback, halfback, and defensive back. He began his coaching career at Chilton High School in Chilton, Wisconsin in 1964. After a year as an assistant in football and basketball, he was promoted to head coach in both sports. Thomas led Chilton's football team to a record of 15–1–1 in two seasons as head coach before he was hired as the head football coach at Lakeland in April 1967.

Thome was named the Illini–Badger Football Conference (IBFC) Coach of the Year in 1979. He resigned from his post at Lakeland in the spring of 1981. In 1982, Thome was hired as the defensive coordinator at Illinois Benedictine College—now known as Benedictine University—in Lisle, Illinois.

Thome was inducted into the Lakeland College Athletic Hall of Fame in 1997 and the Wisconsin Football Coaches Association (WFCA) Hall of Fame in 2001.

Thome died on November 4, 2011, at Zilber Family Hospice in Wauwatosa, Wisconsin.

== Head coaching record ==
=== College football ===
| Year | Team | Overall | Conference | Standing | Bowl/playoffs |
|---|---|---|---|---|---|
Lakeland Muskies (Gateway Conference) (1967–1974)
| 1967 | Lakeland | 8–1 | 4–0 | 1st | |
| 1968 | Lakeland | 7–2 | 4–0 | 1st | |
| 1969 | Lakeland | 8–1 | 4–0 | 1st | |
| 1970 | Lakeland | 6–3 | 3–0 | 1st | |
| 1971 | Lakeland | 6–3–1 | 3–0 | 3rd | |
| 1972 | Lakeland | 4–5–1 | 1–1–1 | 3rd | |
| 1973 | Lakeland | 6–3 | 2–1 | 2nd | |
| 1974 | Lakeland | 6–3 | 2–1 | T–1st | |
Lakeland Muskies (Illini–Badger Football Conference) (1975–1980)
| 1975 | Lakeland | 5–5 | 1–2 | 3rd | |
| 1976 | Lakeland | 1–9 | 0–4 | 5th | |
| 1977 | Lakeland | 2–7 | 1–3 | 4th | |
| 1978 | Lakeland | 7–3 | 3–1 | 2nd | |
| 1979 | Lakeland | 7–3 | 3–1 | T–1st | |
| 1980 | Lakeland | 4–6 | 2–3 | 5th | |
| Lakeland: | | 77–54–2 | 33–17–1 | | |
| Total: | | 77–54–2 | | | |
