= Elmer H. Salzman =

United States Marine Corps general

Elmer Henry Salzman
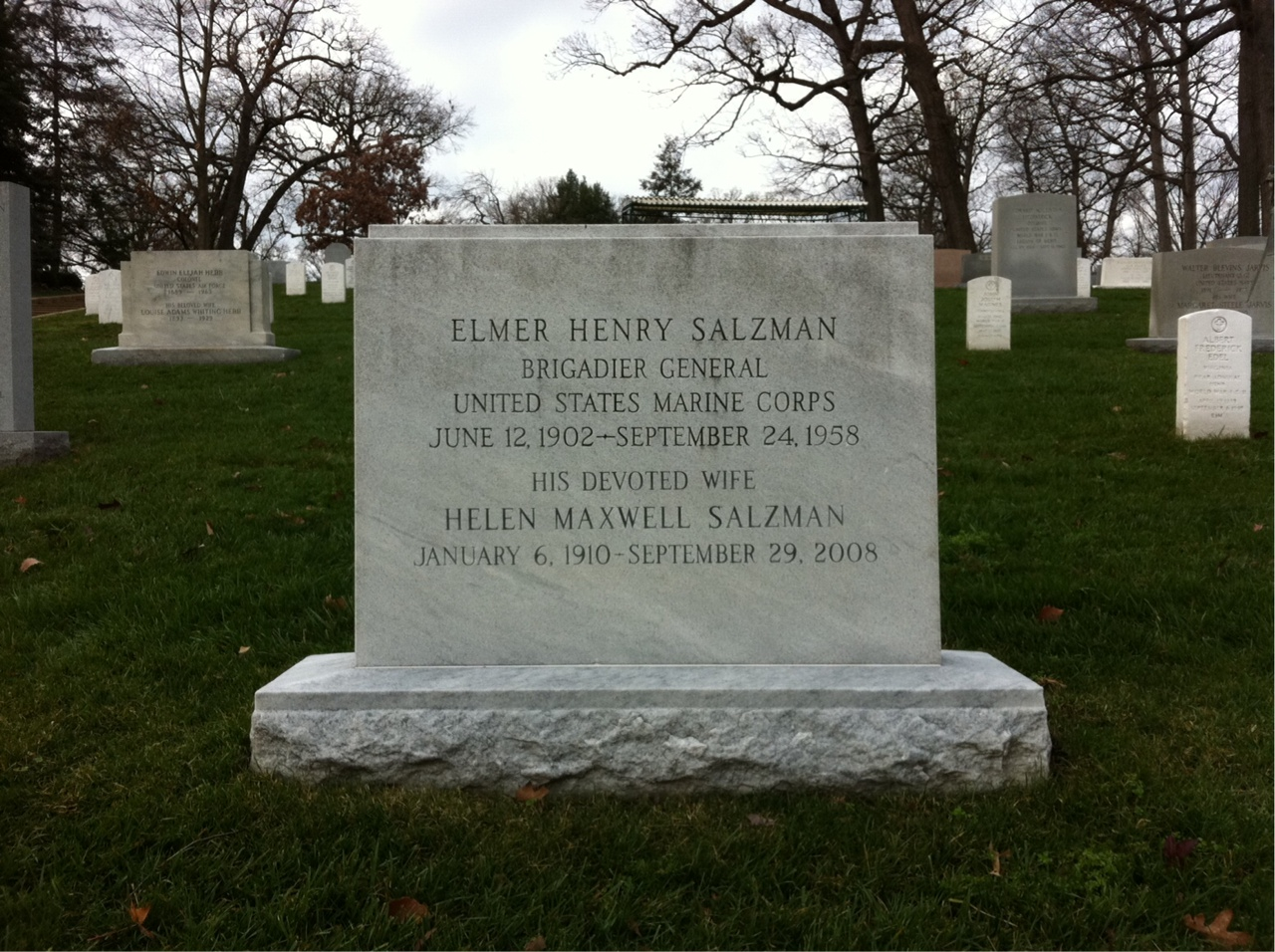
- Grave at Arlington National Cemetery
- Born: June 12, 1902; Louis Corners, Wisconsin, US
- Died: September 24, 1958 (aged 56); Minneapolis, Minnesota, US
- Burial place: Arlington National Cemetery
- Military career
- Allegiance: United States
- Branch: United States Marine Corps
- Service years: 1926–1949
- Rank: Brigadier General
- Nickname: "Salty"
- Service number: 0-4074
- Commands: CoS, Marine Air, West Coast; CoS, 2nd Marine Aircraft Wing
- Conflicts: Nicaraguan Campaign; Haitian Campaign; World War II: Battle of Guadalcanal; Solomon Islands campaign; New Georgia Campaign; Battle of Okinawa
- Awards: Navy Cross; Legion of Merit (3); Bronze Star Medal

Elmer Henry Salzman (June 12, 1902 – September 24, 1958) was a highly decorated officer in the United States Marine Corps with the rank of brigadier general. He is most noted for his work as chief of staff, 2nd Marine Aircraft Wing under Lieutenant General Francis P. Mulcahy and later as chief of staff, Marine Air, West Coast under same commander. Salzman won Navy Cross, the United States military's second-highest decoration awarded for valor in combat, while in Nicaragua with 2nd Marine Brigade.

== Early years ==
Salzman was born on June 12, 1902, in Louis Corners, Wisconsin, and attended elementary school there. He graduated from Kiel High School in 1920, about five miles west of Louis Corners. He then received an appointment to the United States Naval Academy at Annapolis, Maryland, in 1922. During his years at the academy, Salzman competed in track and finally graduated on June 3, 1926.

Following his commissioning as second lieutenant in the Marine Corps, Salzman was attached to the 2nd Marine Brigade under Brigadier General Logan Feland and ordered for his first expeditionary duty to Nicaragua. Marines were ordered to Nicaragua to support the Guardia Nacional in the fight with rebel bandits under Augusto César Sandino.

Salzman led a patrol in the vicinity of village Zapote in Nueva Segovia Department on September 28, 1928. They ambushed a superior bandit force under the command of General Carlos Salgado and subsequently defeated them. Salzman received the Navy Cross for his courage, skill and leadership during that action. He also received Nicaraguan Presidential Medal of Merit with Diploma.

Upon his return to the States, Salzman applied for naval aviation training and after completion of his course at Naval Air Station Pensacola, Florida, he was designated Naval aviator in 1929. He was ordered to Haiti with Observation Squadron and later served with the same unit at Marine Air Station Quantico, Virginia. He then attended a postgraduate course in ordnance at the Naval Academy, and, following the graduation in 1937, Salzman served as commanding officer of the Marine detachment aboard the heavy cruiser USS Indianapolis until 1939.

== World War II ==
Salzman was appointed an instructor at United States Naval Academy at Annapolis, Maryland, in 1939 and taught there for next two years. With the activation of Naval Air Station Quonset Point, he was ordered there in summer 1941 and assumed command of 13th Provisional Company as garrison unit.

Following the Japanese Attack on Pearl Harbor, Salzman was transferred to the staff of 2nd Marine Aircraft Wing under Major General Francis P. Mulcahy and appointed wing intelligence officer. He took part in the Guadalcanal Campaign and was appointed wing chief of staff in June 1943. Salzman was later commended by his work on Guadalcanal and received the Bronze Star Medal.

He reached the rank of colonel and continued as chief of staff of 2nd Marine Aircraft Wing during Solomon Islands campaign. He also simultaneously served as chief of staff, New Georgia Air Force and acting chief of staff, Marine Aircraft South Pacific. Salzman distinguished himself again and was decorated with Legion of Merit by Admiral William F. Halsey.

At the end of March 1944, Salzman was ordered back to the United States and after brief reunion with his wife and kids, he was appointed chief of staff, Marine Air, West Coast with headquarters in San Diego in May of that year.

Colonel Salzman was later transferred to the staff of III Marine Amphibious Corps under Lieutenant General Roy Geiger and appointed assistant chief of staff for military plans. Within this command, he took part in the Battle of Okinawa in April 1945 and received his second Legion of Merit. Salzman also worked on the plans for Army units during the campaign and received third Legion of Merit.

== Retirement ==
He retired in 1949 as a brigadier general to go to work for the Aerospace division of Minneapolis-Honeywell. In 1953 his son Kenneth Salzman graduated from the U.S. Naval Academy. Salzman died Sept. 24, 1958. His wife was the former Helen Maxwell Stevenson (originally from Philadelphia, Pennsylvania). General Salzman is buried at Arlington National Cemetery.

== Navy Cross citation ==
In 1928, Salzman received the Navy Cross for his actions during the Second Nicaraguan Campaign.

His award citation reads:

The President of the United States of America takes pleasure in presenting the Navy Cross to Second Lieutenant Elmer Henry Salzman (MCSN: 0-4074), United States Marine Corps, for distinguished service in the line of his profession as commander of a patrol of the Second Brigade, U.S. Marine Corps, operating in the vicinity of Zapote, Nueva Segovia, Nicaragua on 28 September 1928. Second Lieutenant Salzman's command surprised a greatly superior bandit force under the command of General Salgado by a well planned attack on its rear which resulted in the rout of the bandits. The arrival of the Force of Second Lieutenant Salzman was particularly fortuitous as the bandits had another small patrol of Marines at a great disadvantage and it appeared that they must inevitably suffer a disastrous defeat. Although the bandits outnumbered the combined patrols more than two-to-one, Second Lieutenant Salzman displayed such courage, skill and leadership in conducting the engagement that the bandits were decisively defeated and the beleaguered patrol rescued from its perilous position.
