= New Holstein High School =

Coordinates: 43°56′50.0″N 88°06′14.4″W

Location
- 1715 Plymouth Street; New Holstein, (Calumet County), Wisconsin 53061; United States

Information
- Type: Public high school
- Principal: Doug Olig
- Staff: 23.06 (FTE)
- Enrollment: 321 (2022-23)
- Student to teacher ratio: 13.92
- Colors: Red and white
- Fight song: "On Wisconsin"
- Athletics conference: Eastern Wisconsin
- Nickname: Huskies

New Holstein High School is a public high school located in New Holstein, Wisconsin, USA. It has an enrollment of approximately 336 students in 9th to 12th grades.

== Enrollment ==
From 2000 to 2019, enrollment declined by 24.4%.

Enrollment at New Holstein High School, 2000–2019

View source data.

== Sports ==
New Holstein's mascot is the Husky. The school offers girls' and boys' soccer, mixed football, mixed track, mixed cross country, girls' volleyball, boys' and girls' basketball, girls' softball, mixed golf and boys' baseball. They Also CO-OP with the Fond Du Lac Cardinals and have a hockey team. Two sports that most schools offer in the Eastern Wisconsin Conference that New Holstein does not are tennis and swimming.

New Holstein is the smallest school in the Eastern Wisconsin Conference. New Holstein's closest rivals are the Kiel Raiders.

=== State titles ===
1941 and 1942 State Track and Field Champions
1965 Baseball Champions
1982 Girls' Track and Field Champions
2010 Girls' Soccer Champions

=== Athletic conference affiliation history ===
- Eastern Wisconsin Conference (1923-1970)
- Packerland Conference (1970-1979)
- Eastern Wisconsin Conference (1979–present)
