= Billy Schrauth =

American football player (born 2003)

No. 75 – Tampa Bay Buccaneers
- Position: Guard
- Roster status: Active

Personal information
- Born: September 9, 2003 (age 23)
- Listed height: 6 ft 5 in (1.96 m)
- Listed weight: 310 lb (141 kg)

Career information
- High school: St. Mary's Springs (Fond du Lac, Wisconsin)
- College: Notre Dame (2022–2025)
- NFL draft: 2026: 5th round, 160th overall pick

Career history
- Tampa Bay Buccaneers (2026–present)
- Stats at Pro Football Reference

William K. Schrauth (born September 9, 2003) is an American professional football guard for the Tampa Bay Buccaneers of the National Football League (NFL). He played college football for the Notre Dame Fighting Irish and was selected by the Buccaneers in the fifth round of the 2026 NFL draft.

== Early life ==
Schrauth attended St. Mary's Springs Academy in Fond du Lac, Wisconsin. He committed to play college football for the Notre Dame Fighting Irish over offers from Ohio State and Wisconsin, among others.

== College career ==
Schrauth did not play as a true freshman. As a redshirt freshman in 2023, he played in all thirteen games, originally only on the field goal and extra point units, but later took over as starting right guard for the final three games after Rocco Spindler had a season-ending injury. He began the 2024 season as the starting right guard, before injuring his ankle against Purdue. He returned at left guard after missing four games.

== Professional career ==
Pre-draft measurables
Height	Weight	Arm length	Hand span	Wingspan
6 ft 4 3/4 in (1.95 m)	310 lb (141 kg)	32 7/8 in (0.84 m)	10 1/4 in (0.26 m)	6 ft 8 7/8 in (2.05 m)
All values from NFL Combine

Schrauth was selected by the Tampa Bay Buccaneers in the fifth round with the 160th overall pick of the 2026 NFL Draft.
