= Kristine Jarinovska =

Latvian legal scholar

Kristine Jarinovska (born 22 August 1977) is legal scientist, doctor of juridical science, legal scholar, sworn advocate, attorney at law,, historian and was the Secretary of State of Ministry of Education and Science of the Republic of Latvia, leading researcher of the University of Latvia.

== Education ==
Jarinovska was raised in a family of Latvian emigres in the state of Wisconsin. She graduated from the Catholic Xavier High School in Appleton, Wisconsin in 1997. Jarinovska graduated from Riga Graduate School of Law in 2003. In her doctoral studies, Jarinovska conducted research at the Université Paris X, Académie de Versailles. Doctor of juridical science, Dr. iur. doctor iuris of the University of Latvia.

== Civil servant ==
Jarinovska works as legal expert for the government. She served as a civil servant from 1999 in the Latvian Ministry of Justice, mainly as Director of the Department of Methodology and Systematization. She participated in a legal research network of European Union independent experts, investigating fundamental rights, legal aid, European law and other law research topics. Jarinovska served as Deputy Director-General of the Latvian State Environmental Service, State Capital Shareholder in various capital companies of the Republic of Latvia, Chairperson of the Certification Commission for Insolvency Administrators, Chairperson of the Board of Directors of the state joint-stock company Tiesu namu aģentūra ('Courthouse Agency') and of the government gazette Latvijas Vēstnesis. Jarinovska was leading actor in preparing a contract between the Latvian and Swedish governments in creating Riga Graduated School of Law and transfer shares to University of Latvia.

Jarinovska was appointed as the State Secretary for Ministry of Education and Science in 2006. Kristine Jarinovska was elected by Government of Republic of Latvia as Deputy President of the former Government Commission for Latvian SSR KGB Research in 2014 as the chair of Institute of Constitutional Law. Since 2023, Jarinovska has been working at the Saeima – the parliament of the Republic of Latvia.

== Researcher ==
In her academic career, Jarinovska has been a fellow Riga Graduate School of Law, and Law College, and a leading researcher at the European Law Institute and at the University of Latvia. Jarinovska's research interests includes the Constitution of the Republic of Latvia and Freedom of Information. In 2018, Jarinovska was elected as the chair of the Scientific Council of the Center of Public Memory of Latvia. The Center of Public Memory calls for the removal of monuments glorifying communist totalitarian regime. From 2025 to 2026 Jarinovska worked as researcher for the Prosecutor's Office on behalf of the Prosecutor General.
