= Sheboygan Falls High School =

Location
- 220 Amherst Avenue; Sheboygan Falls, Wisconsin 53085; United States
- 43.7190°N 87.8117°W

Information
- School type: Public high school
- School district: School District of Sheboygan Falls
- Principal: Michael J. Nikson
- Teaching staff: 33.73 (FTE)
- Grades: 9 through 12
- Enrollment: 502 (2023-2024)
- Student to teacher ratio: 14.88
- Colors: Purple and gold
- Athletics conference: Eastern Wisconsin Conference
- Nickname: Falcons
- Website: sheboyganfalls.k12.wi.us

Sheboygan Falls High School is a public high school located in Sheboygan Falls, Wisconsin. It serves students in grades 9 through 12. The school colors are purple and gold and they are referred to as the "Falcons."

== Sports ==
The school offers many sports such as baseball, basketball, cross country, football, golf, soccer, softball, tennis, track and field, and volleyball.

The school has a strong history of successful sports teams. Sheboygan Falls has claimed 6 WIAA state championships and 3 Runner Up trophies.

- 2024 WIAA Division 2 Runner Up in Soccer.
- 2000 WIAA Division 3 State Champions in Football. The Falcons cruised to a D3 title finishing the season with a 14-0 record including 11 shut-outs. The Falcons averaged 384.1 rushing yards per game and still hold a D3 state championship game record of 469 rushing yards. Sheboygan Falls football has made the playoffs 24 times since 1985. Falls has won 18 conference championships.
- 1992 WIAA Division 2 Runner Up in Track.
- 1987 Class B Runner Up in Football.
- 1983 Class B State Champions in Women's Volleyball.
- 1979 Class B State Runner Up in Women's Basketball
- 1975 Class B State Champions in Men's Basketball.
- 1974 Class B State Champions in Men's Basketball.
- 1973 State Champions in Summer Baseball.

=== Athletic conference affiliation history ===
- Eastern Wisconsin Conference (1923-1970)
- Packerland Conference (1970-1979)
- Eastern Wisconsin Conference (1979–present)

== Enrollment ==
From 2000–2019, high school enrollment declined 16.3%.

Enrollment at Sheboygan Falls High School, 2000–2019
