= Two Rivers High School (Wisconsin) =

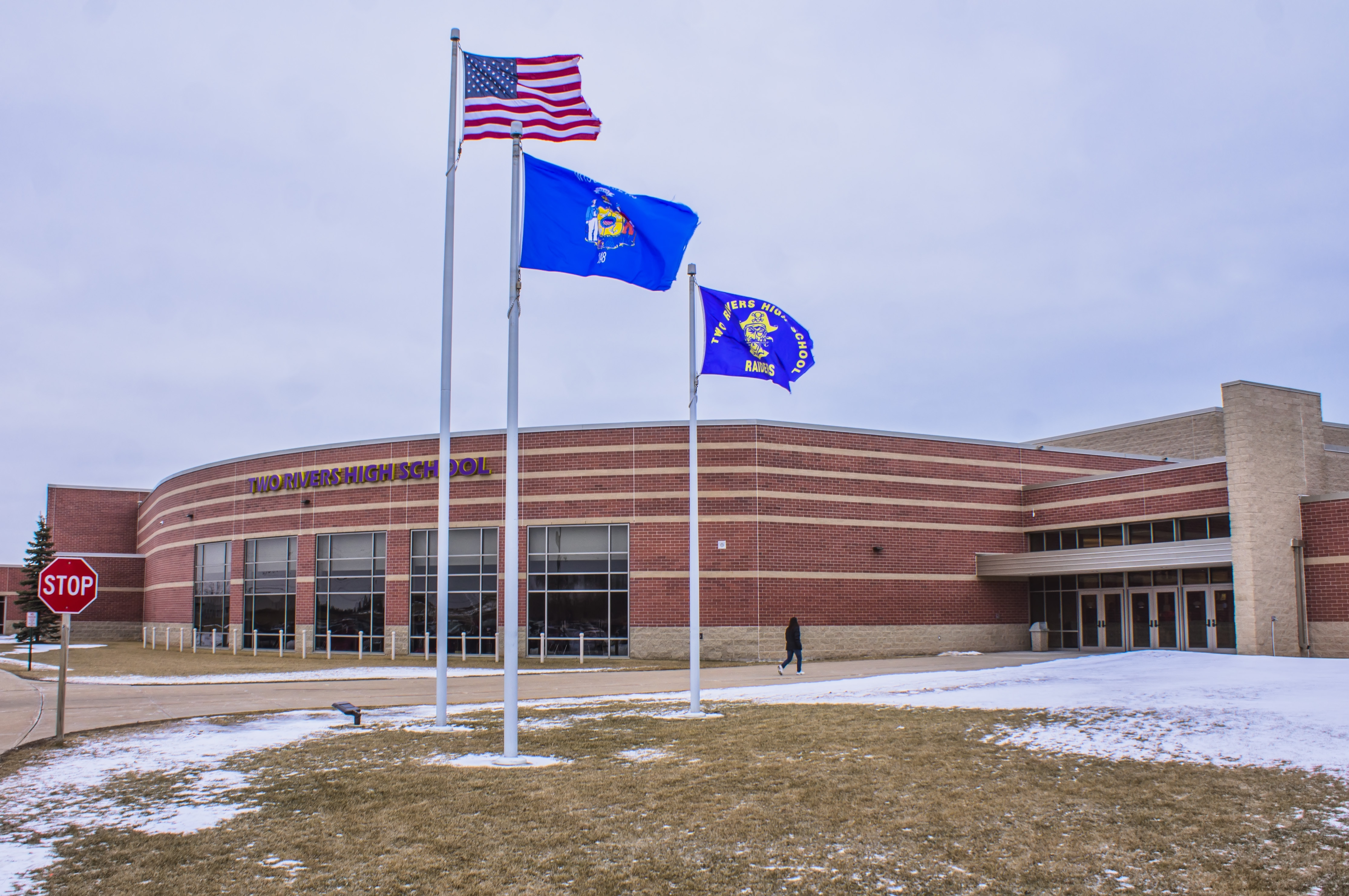
- Front Entrance Facing Highway 42

Location
- 4519 Lincoln Avenue; Two Rivers, Wisconsin; United States; 44.1717°N 87.5597°W

Information
- Type: Public
- Established: 2002
- School district: Two Rivers Public Schools
- Principal: Timothy Engh
- Teaching staff: 36.29 (on FTE basis)
- Grades: 9 to 12
- Enrollment: 477 (2023-2024)
- Student to teacher ratio: 13.14
- Colors: Purple and Gold
- Slogan: ALL students are capable of success-NO EXCEPTIONS!
- Athletics conference: Eastern Wisconsin Conference
- Mascot: Rickie Raider
- Team name: Purple Raiders
- Website: home page
- School Song = Purple and gold/Anchors Aweigh

Two Rivers High School is a high school located in Two Rivers, Wisconsin. It was built in 2001 to replace the former Washington High School in downtown Two Rivers. The school is located at 4519 Lincoln Avenue Wisconsin Highway 42 on the outskirts of Two Rivers. The school athletically takes part in the Eastern Wisconsin Conference. Conference rivals include Roncalli High School, Kiel High School, and Valders High School. A total of 24 Credits and 25 Community Service Hours are required in order to graduate from the school.

Two Rivers High is ranked 355-457th within Wisconsin. Students have the opportunity to take Advanced Placement coursework and exams. The AP participation rate at Two Rivers High is 3%. The total minority enrollment is 14%, and 30% of students are economically disadvantaged. Two Rivers High is the only high school in the Two Rivers Public School District. A notable alumni is Jordan Steckler who played in the NFL for the Houston Texans.

== Athletics ==
Two Rivers athletic teams are nicknamed the Raiders, and their colors are purple and gold. They have been members of the Eastern Wisconsin Conference since it was reconstituted in 1979.

=== Athletic conference affiliation history ===
- Northeastern Wisconsin Conference (1927-1952)
- Mid-Eastern Conference (1952-1970)
- Fox River Valley Conference (1970-1977)
- Fox Valley Association (1977-1979)
- Eastern Wisconsin Conference (1979–present)
