= Jordan Steckler =

American football player (born 1996)

Profile
- Position: Offensive tackle

Personal information
- Born: July 16, 1996 (age 30); Two Rivers, Wisconsin, U.S.
- Listed height: 6 ft 5 in (1.96 m)
- Listed weight: 305 lb (138 kg)

Career information
- High school: Two Rivers (WI)
- College: Northern Illinois
- NFL draft: 2020: undrafted

Career history
- New Orleans Saints (2020)*; New England Patriots (2020)*; Houston Texans (2021)*; Cleveland Browns (2021)*; Houston Texans (2021–2022); Houston Gamblers (2023); Philadelphia Stars (2024)*; Arlington Renegades (2024)*
- * Offseason or practice squad member only

Awards and highlights
- First-team All-MAC (2019)
- Stats at Pro Football Reference

Jordan Steckler (born July 16, 1996) is an American professional football offensive tackle. He played college football at Northern Illinois.

== Early life and college ==
Steckler was born in Two Rivers, Wisconsin to his mom Elaine and Bart Steckler. Has an older brother Matt who started off attending UW-Stout and finished his schooling at Lakeland University, Sheboygan where he played football. Steckler attended Two Rivers High School in Wisconsin and played football for them. He was an all-state honorable mention selection by coaches. Where he was coached by Kevin Shillcox. He was also a basketball player for the Raiders' high school team. From 2016 to 2019, Steckler played at Northern Illinois University for four seasons. He started 43 games and appeared in 47 during his four-year career. In the 2018 MAC Championship game, Steckler was part of an offensive line that led the NIU offense to 20 second-half points in a comeback win over Buffalo Bulls.

== Professional career ==
In April 2020, Steckler signed as a college free agent with the New Orleans Saints. After spending the offseason with the Saints, he was signed to the practice squad of the New England Patriots for weeks 8 through 17 of the 2020 NFL season.

In February 2021, he signed with the Houston Texans, He was waived by the Texans on August 31, 2021.

On September 2, 2021, he was signed to the practice squad of the Cleveland Browns. He was released on September 20, 2021.

On October 5, 2021, he was signed to the Texans' practice squad. He signed a reserve/future contract with the Texans on January 11, 2022.

On August 30, 2022, Steckler was waived by the Texans and signed to the team's practice squad the next day.

Steckler signed with the Houston Gamblers of the United States Football League (USFL) on February 19, 2023. He was waived after the season and claimed off waivers by the Philadelphia Stars on September 19, 2023. The Stars folded when the XFL and USFL merged to create the United Football League (UFL).

Steckler signed with the Arlington Renegades of the UFL on January 29, 2024. He was removed from the team's roster on March 21, 2024.
