= FVL =

FVL may refer to:

- Factor V, a protein
- Fox Valley Lutheran High School, in Appleton, Wisconsin, United States
- Future Vertical Lift, a program of the United States Armed Forces
