= Dave Casper =

American football player (born 1952)

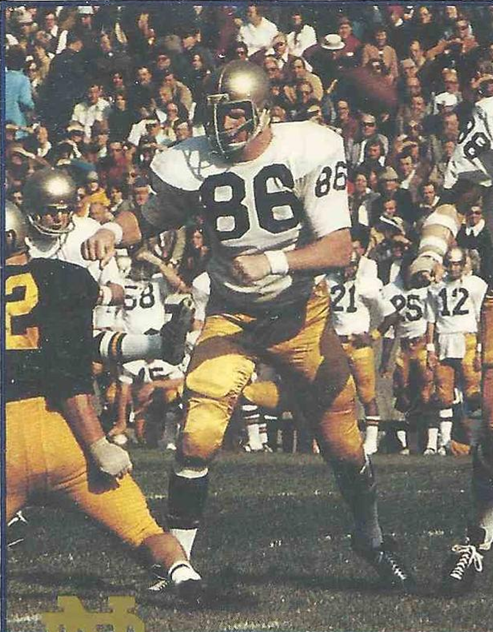
- Casper for Notre Dame

No. 87, 44
- Position: Tight end

Personal information
- Born: February 2, 1952 (age 74); Bemidji, Minnesota, U.S.
- Listed height: 6 ft 4 in (1.93 m)
- Listed weight: 240 lb (109 kg)

Career information
- High school: Chilton (Chilton, Wisconsin)
- College: Notre Dame (1971–1973)
- NFL draft: 1974: 2nd round, 45th overall pick

Career history
- Oakland Raiders (1974–1980); Houston Oilers (1980–1983); Minnesota Vikings (1983); Los Angeles Raiders (1984)

Awards and highlights
- Super Bowl champion (XI); 4× First-team All-Pro (1976–1979); 5× Pro Bowl (1976–1980); NFL 1970s All-Decade Team; National champion (1973); Consensus All-American (1973)

Career NFL statistics
- Receptions: 378
- Receiving yards: 5,216
- Receiving touchdowns: 52
- Stats at Pro Football Reference
- Pro Football Hall of Fame
- College Football Hall of Fame

David John Casper (born February 2, 1952) nicknamed "the Ghost", is an American former professional football player who was a tight end in the National Football League (NFL), primarily with the Oakland Raiders. Casper has been inducted into both the College Football Hall of Fame (2012) and the Pro Football Hall of Fame (2002).

== Early life ==
Casper spent his first three years of high school at St. Edward Central Catholic High School in Elgin, Illinois, and his senior season was at Chilton High School in Chilton, Wisconsin, 35 miles south of Green Bay. He was a member of the 1969 Chilton team that outscored their opponents 363–0 in eight games. The small-town team was ranked eighth in the state behind the largest schools in the state; there was no playoff system at the time.

== College career ==
Casper played collegiate football at the University of Notre Dame, where he earned Honorable Mention All-America for the Fighting Irish as a tackle in 1972. In 1973, he was an All-American on the 1973 National Championship Team. He was the 1973 ND Offensive MVP as a tight end and recorded 21 receptions for 335 yards and four touchdowns in his career.

Casper earned his bachelor's degree in economics and graduated in 1974. He was also the captain of the Omicron Delta Epsilon honor society. In 2012, he was inducted into the College Football Hall of Fame.

== Professional career ==
Casper was selected with the 45th overall pick in the second round of the 1974 NFL draft by the Oakland Raiders. Casper only caught a total of nine passes his first two seasons, but was a top-ten receiver in their championship season in 1976, in which he had 53 catches for 691 yards and 10 touchdowns.

=== Ghost to the Post ===
One of Casper's most memorable games as a Raider came in a 1977 Divisional Playoff game against the Baltimore Colts. Casper made an over-the-head catch of a soft pass lofted by Ken Stabler on "The Ghost to the Post." The 42-yard reception set up a game-tying field goal that forced overtime and the Raiders went on to a 37–31 victory with Casper's 10-yard touchdown reception in the second overtime period. He finished the game with four receptions for 70 yards and three touchdowns.

=== The Holy Roller ===
Casper was also involved in another famous NFL contest in 1978 on September 10 between the Raiders and San Diego Chargers. The Raiders trailed the Chargers 20–14 with just ten seconds left in the game when Oakland quarterback Ken Stabler, about to be sacked, dropped the football. He flicked it toward the goal line in an effort to save the game and Raiders running back Pete Banaszak recovered the ball at the San Diego 12-yard line but dropped the ball again and it rolled further forward. Casper kicked the ball at the San Diego 5-yard line and finally recovered it in the end zone to tie the game. The extra point attempt was good and Oakland won the game by a point, 21–20. Stabler, Banaszak and Casper all admitted afterwards that they had deliberately fumbled or batted the ball towards the end zone.

The Chargers protested on the grounds that Stabler's fumble was actually a forward pass and therefore should have been ruled incomplete when it hit the ground. As a result of the play, the NFL changed its rules to make it illegal for the teammate of a ball carrier to advance the ball if the ball carrier fumbles on fourth down or in the last two minutes of the game.

=== Other career highlights ===
Casper caught the first touchdown of Super Bowl XI, a 32–14 Raiders victory over the Minnesota Vikings. As a Raider, Casper was selected to four straight Pro Bowls (1976–1979).

Along with his three touchdown catches in the "Ghost to the Post" game, Casper caught two more TD's in the 1977 AFC Championship Game. His five TD's in a postseason is an NFL record for tight ends that still stands today.

Midway through the 1980 season Casper was traded to the Houston Oilers for their first and second-round draft picks. He was reunited with his former Raider quarterback, Ken Stabler, when he was traded to the Oilers. He finished the 1980 season with 56 receptions and was named to his fifth Pro Bowl. However, the trade caused him to miss out on a second Super Bowl ring, as the Raiders went on to win the Super Bowl that year, beating Houston in the playoffs on the way there. After the 3rd week of the 1983 season, Casper and quarterback Archie Manning were traded to the Minnesota Vikings. In 1984, he returned to the Raiders (who won another Super Bowl the year before) for his final NFL season.

Casper finished his pro career with 378 receptions, 5,216 yards and 52 touchdowns. In 2002, he was inducted into the Pro Football Hall of Fame. He was the 13th Raider to be inducted.

== NFL career statistics ==
Legend
| | Won the Super Bowl |
| **Bold** | Career high |

=== Regular season ===
| Year | Team | Games | | Receiving | | | | |
| Year | Team | GP | GS | Rec | Yds | Avg | Lng | TD |
|---|---|---|---|---|---|---|---|---|
| 1974 | OAK | 14 | 0 | 4 | 26 | 6.5 | 17 | 3 |
| 1975 | OAK | 14 | 0 | 5 | 71 | 14.2 | 20 | 1 |
| 1976 | OAK | 13 | 13 | 53 | 691 | 13.0 | 30 | **10** |
| 1977 | OAK | 14 | 14 | 48 | 584 | 12.2 | 27 | 6 |
| 1978 | OAK | 16 | 16 | **62** | **852** | 13.7 | 44 | 9 |
| 1979 | OAK | 15 | 12 | 57 | 771 | 13.5 | 42 | 3 |
| 1980 | OAK | 6 | 6 | 22 | 270 | 12.3 | 35 | 1 |
| 1980 | HOU | 10 | 9 | 34 | 526 | 15.5 | 43 | 3 |
| 1981 | HOU | 16 | 11 | 33 | 572 | **17.3** | **52** | 8 |
| 1982 | HOU | 9 | 9 | 36 | 573 | 15.9 | 38 | 6 |
| 1983 | HOU | 3 | 2 | 7 | 79 | 11.3 | 17 | 0 |
| 1983 | MIN | 10 | 8 | 13 | 172 | 13.2 | 34 | 0 |
| 1984 | RAI | 7 | 0 | 4 | 29 | 7.3 | 13 | 2 |
| | | 147 | 100 | 378 | 5,216 | 13.8 | 52 | 52 |

=== Playoffs ===
| Year | Team | Games | | Receiving | | | | |
| Year | Team | GP | GS | Rec | Yds | Avg | Lng | TD |
|---|---|---|---|---|---|---|---|---|
| 1974 | OAK | 2 | 0 | 0 | 0 | 0.0 | 0 | 0 |
| 1975 | OAK | 2 | 0 | 6 | 69 | 11.5 | 23 | 1 |
| 1976 | OAK | 3 | 3 | **9** | 122 | 13.6 | 26 | 1 |
| 1977 | OAK | 2 | 2 | **9** | **141** | **15.7** | **42** | **5** |
| 1980 | HOU | 1 | 1 | 3 | 31 | 10.3 | 12 | 0 |
| 1984 | RAI | 1 | 1 | 0 | 0 | 0.0 | 0 | 0 |
| | | 11 | 7 | 27 | 363 | 13.4 | 42 | 7 |

== Current activities ==
In recent years, Casper has been working for Northwestern Mutual Financial Network in Walnut Creek, California (and now Vernon Hills, Illinois) assisting business owners with financial planning and consultation work.
