= Kiel High School =

Coordinates: 43°55′27.0″N 88°01′55.4″W

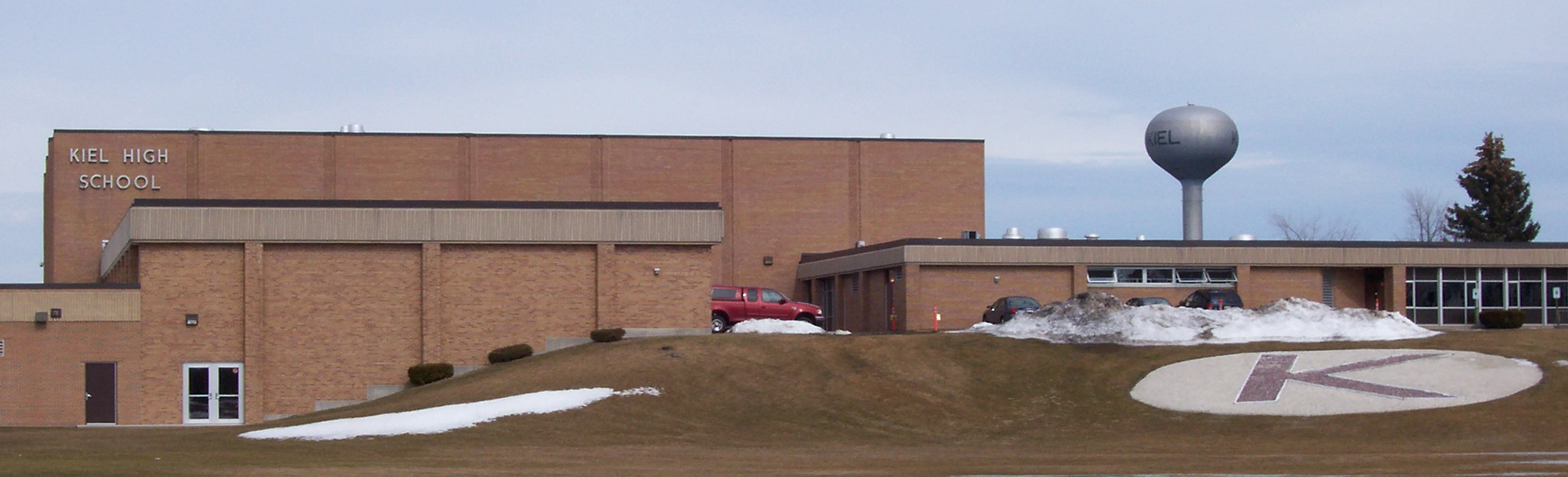
- Kiel High School in 2007
- 210 Raider Hts; Kiel, Wisconsin 53042

Information
- Type: Public
- Principal: Michael Hendricks
- Staff: 23.88 (FTE)
- Enrollment: 392 (2023-2024)
- Student to teacher ratio: 16.42
- Color
- Athletics conference: Eastern Wisconsin Conference
- Team name: Raiders
- Information: (920) 894-2263
- Website: Kiel High School

Kiel High School is a public secondary school located in the town of Kiel, Wisconsin, United States. It includes grades nine through twelve. The school's teams are known as the Raiders.

Kiel High is a part of the Kiel Area School District, which includes four public schools and approximately 1500 students.

== Enrollment ==
From 2000 to 2019, high school enrollment declined 24.2%.

Enrollment at Kiel High School, 2000–2019

== Athletics ==
Kiel's athletic teams are known as the Raiders, and they have been members of the Eastern Wisconsin Conference since its reformation in 1979.

=== Athletic conference affiliation history ===
- Eastern Wisconsin Conference (1923-1970)
- Mid-Valley Conference (1946-1947)
- Packerland Conference (1970-1979)
- Eastern Wisconsin Conference (1979–present)

== Notable alumni ==
- Trevor Casper, former Wisconsin State Trooper
- Nicolas Hammann, race car driver
- Elmer Salzman, brigadier general in the Marine Corps and Navy Cross recipient
