= Roncalli High School (Wisconsin) =

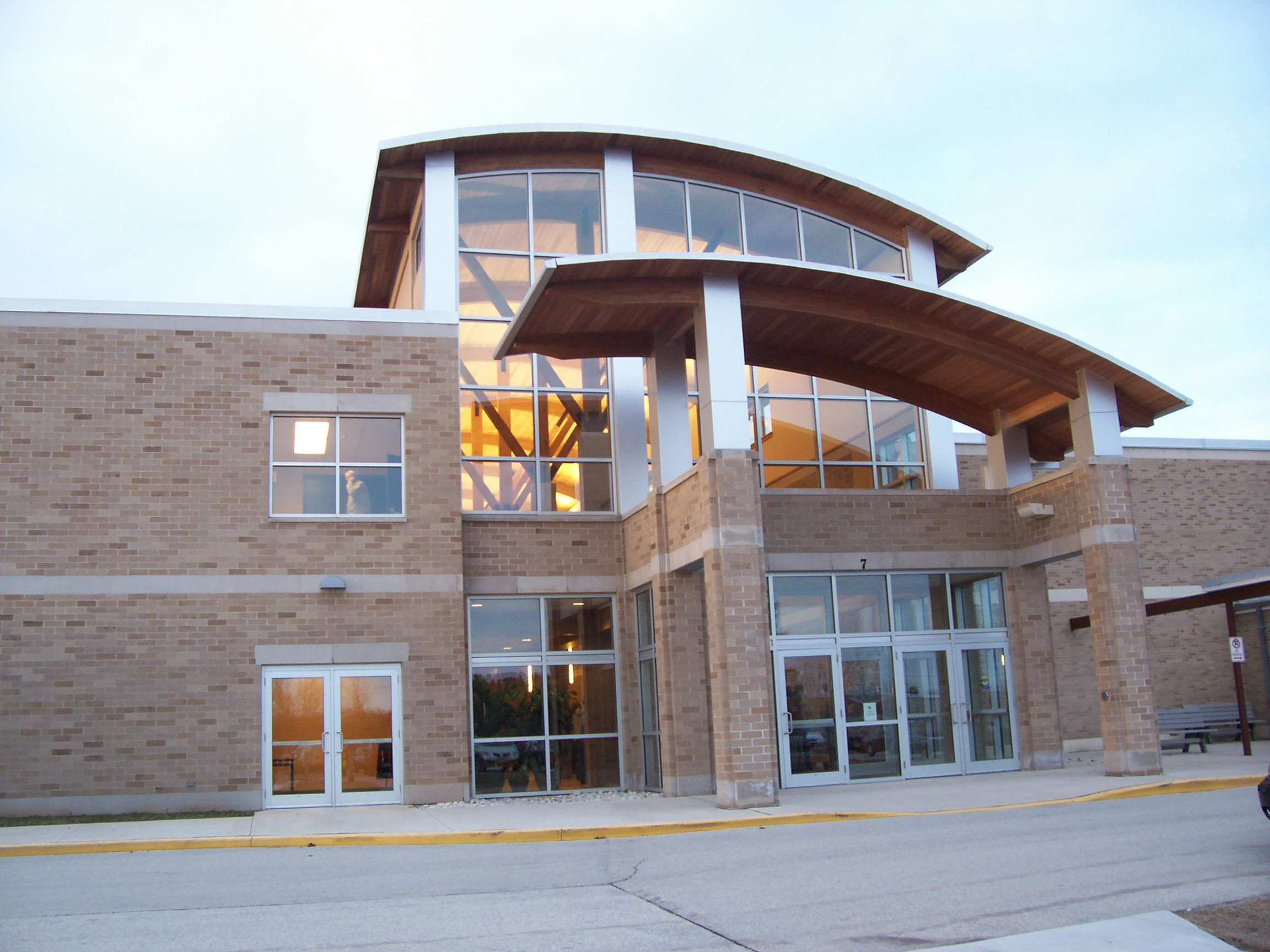

Location
- 2000 Mirro Drive; Manitowoc, (Manitowoc County), Wisconsin 54220; United States; 44°7′35″N 87°37′55″W

Information
- Type: Private, coeducational
- Motto: The mission of Roncalli High School is to educate in the Catholic traditions of spiritual growth, life-long service, and academic excellence.
- Religious affiliation: Roman Catholic
- Established: 1965
- Oversight: Diocese of Green Bay
- President: John Stelzer
- Principal: Fran Peter
- Grades: 9–12
- Gender: Coeducational
- Campus size: 15 acres
- Campus type: Closed
- Colors: Navy blue and columbia blue
- Song: "Roncalli Fight Song"
- Athletics: Cross country (boys), track and field, golf, tennis, basketball, volleyball, swimming
- Athletics conference: Eastern Wisconsin
- Mascot: Jet
- Team name: Jets
- Rival: Valders Vikings, Two Rivers Purple Raiders
- Accreditation: AdvancED
- Yearbook: The Pilot
- Tuition: $5,700
- Athletic Director: Nathan Kaderabek
- Website: Official website

Roncalli High School is a private, Catholic high school located in Manitowoc, Wisconsin, United States. It is owned by the Diocese of Green Bay. Founded in 1965 by the De La Salle Christian Brothers, Roncalli High School is named for Pope John XXIII (né Angelo Roncalli). It offers a college-prep curriculum. In 2022, the school merged with the Catholic elementary and middle schools, becoming known as Roncalli Catholic Schools.

The school's teams are known as the Jets.

A Fine Arts Center for the visual and performing arts is the newest addition, which includes The Zimmer Auditorium.

Roncalli's educational values are inspired by St. John Baptist de La Salle, St. Francis Of Assisi, St. Edith Stein, and Pope John XXIII.

The school offers AP classes, including AP Chemistry, AP Physics, AP Biology, AP United States History and AP Calculus.

== Athletics ==
Roncalli's athletic teams are nicknamed the Jets, and they have been members of the Eastern Wisconsin Conference since 2015.

=== Athletic conference affiliation history ===
- Kettle Moraine Conference (1967-1968)
- Fox Valley Catholic Conference (1968-1971)
- Fox Valley Christian Conference (1971-1999)
- Eastern Wisconsin Conference (1999-2007)
- Olympian Conference (2007-2015)
- Eastern Wisconsin Conference (2015–present)

== Notable alumni ==
- Jim Schmitt, former mayor of Green Bay
- Bob Ziegelbauer, Wisconsin politician
- Michael Zimmer, privacy and social media scholar
