= Chilton High School (Wisconsin) =

Public school in Wisconsin, United States

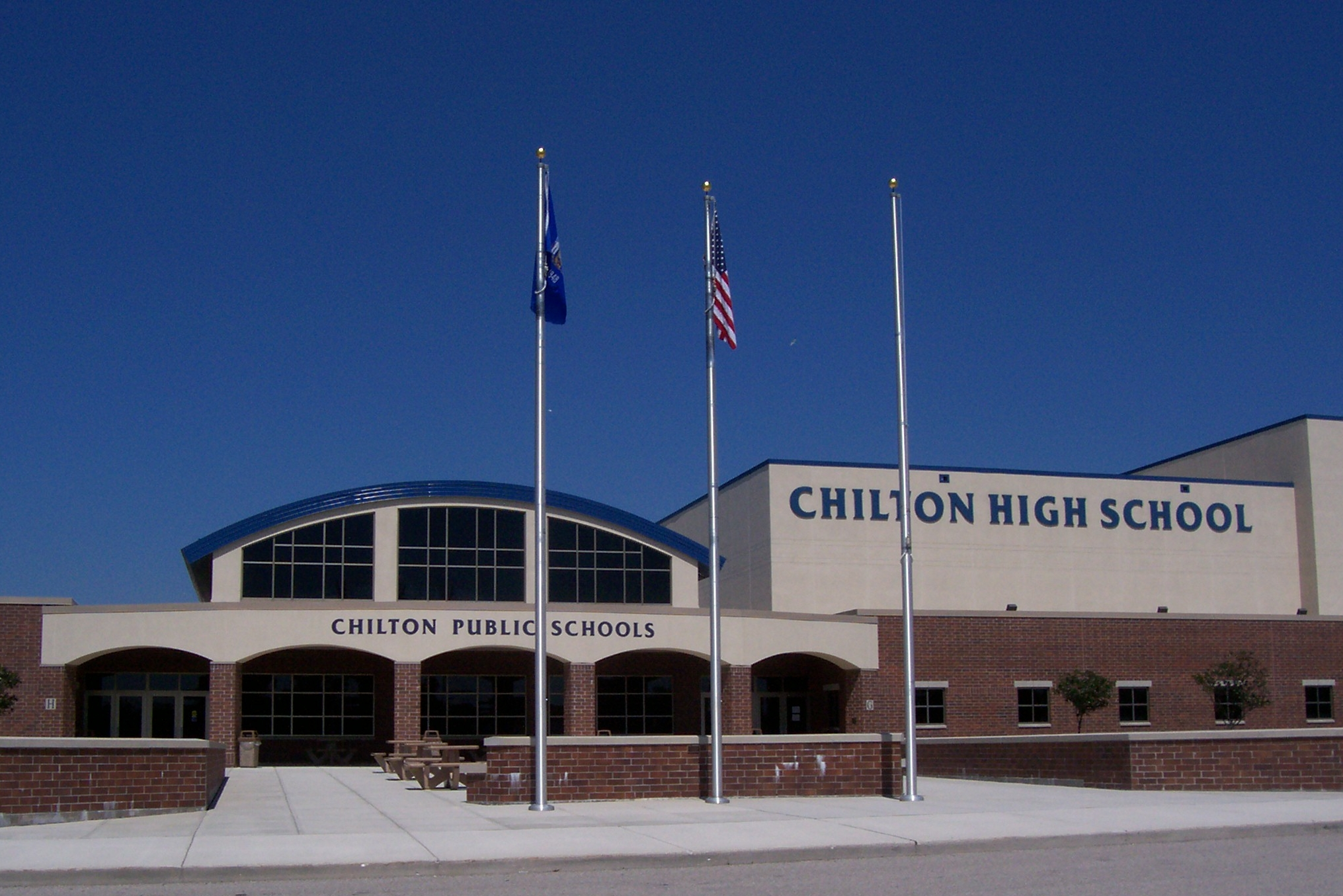
- Chilton High School

Location
- 530 W. Main Street; Chilton, Wisconsin; United States
- Coordinates: 44.0241°N 88.1759°W

Information
- Type: Public
- School district: Chilton Public Schools
- NCES School ID: 550252000279
- Principal: Shawn Rude
- Faculty: 25.06 (on FTE basis)
- Grades: 9-12
- Enrollment: 385 (2023-2024)
- Student to teacher ratio: 15.36
- Colors: Navy blue & gold
- Athletics conference: Eastern Wisconsin Conference
- Mascot: Tigers
- Nickname: CHS
- Website: chilton.k12.wi.us/schools/chs

Chilton High School is a public high school located in Calumet County, Wisconsin, on the south end of the city of Chilton near U.S. Route 151.

Originally built on School Court in 1934, the old building which was in need of more than just a few repairs was destroyed and replaced by a park. The current building was built on the same plot of land as the Elementary and Middle school are built on, and then was opened in September 2003.

== Sports ==
Chilton's 1969 football team went undefeated. The team included future Pro Football Hall of Fame inductee Dave Casper. It outscored their opponents 363–0 in eight games, had 98-49 first down advantage, rushed 1810 yards to 116 for their opponents, outpassed their opponents 702 - 203, with a total offense of 2512 yards versus 399. Their lowest margin of victory was 7-0 and second lowest margin was 33–0. The small-town team was ranked eighth in the state behind the largest schools in the state; there was no playoff system at the time. In 2017, the Pro Football Hall of Fame named the school one of 109 "Hometown Hall of Fame" schools because of Casper.

In the 1985-85 basketball season, Chilton's team won the Wisconsin Interscholastic Athletic Association Class B Boys' championship. Team player Todd Eisner was nominated as a McDonald's All American and later played at Creighton University. Chilton beat Whitnall and Prairie du Chien to win the title.

Chilton's Girls' basketball team won the Division 3 state title in 1991–92. Tracy Winkler was named to the first team of the Associated Press (AP) all-state team and AP named coach Ray Mlada as the state's coach of the year.

=== Athletic conference affiliation history ===
- Eastern Wisconsin Conference (1923-1969)
- Mid-Valley Conference (1946-1947)
- Packerland Conference (1970-1979)
- Eastern Wisconsin Conference (1979-1999)
- Olympian Conference (1999-2015)
- Eastern Wisconsin Conference (2015–present)

== Theater ==
The Engler Center for the Performing Arts in the school seats 735.

== Notable alumni ==
- Dave Casper, football player
- B. R. Goggins, mayor of Wisconsin Rapids and lawyer
- Nicholas J. Lesselyoung, politician
- Carl J. Peik, politician
