= Washington High School (Two Rivers, Wisconsin) =

Public high school in Two Rivers, Wisconsin

Coordinates: 44°09′32″N 87°34′07″W

- Two Rivers, Manitowoc County, Wisconsin; United States

Information
- School type: High school

Washington High School was a public high school in Two Rivers, Wisconsin.

== History ==
The first public school in Two Rivers was built in 1866 for $5,000 at the site of the current city hall and named the H.P. Hamilton School. In 1905, it was moved to the back of the lot and a new, red brick high school was built for $80,000. It was also named the H.P. Hamilton School and would eventually become City Hall. Several years before the Community House renovation, the city debated tearing down that old building. They decided to do extensive remodeling instead. Today, the two buildings gaze upon one another across the historic Central Park.

During the 1930s and 1940s, Washington High's facilities were used for summer training by a number of professional football teams, including the Philadelphia Eagles in 1941 and 1942, the Pittsburgh Pirates, the Columbus Bullies and the Chicago Rockets.

In 1976, the Washington High chess team won the United States national high school chess tournament. They had won the Wisconsin high school championship for four years running.

In April 2000, after a three-year battle, a referendum narrowly passed to demolish Washington and replace it with a new school, later named Two Rivers High School in 2002. Advocates of the demolition (including the school board) claimed that rehabilitation would be too expensive; Washington supporters claimed that the figures were being manipulated, and that the real goal was to move the high school to a more suburban setting ("a cornfield on the edge of town") outside the historical center of Two Rivers.

== Notable alumni ==
Notable alumni include professional wrestler Ken Anderson, alias Mr. Kennedy. The father of U.S. Senator Thomas J. Walsh was in part responsible for the school being built, although the future Senator does not appear to have attended the school himself.
