= Louis Corners, Wisconsin =

- Unincorporated community
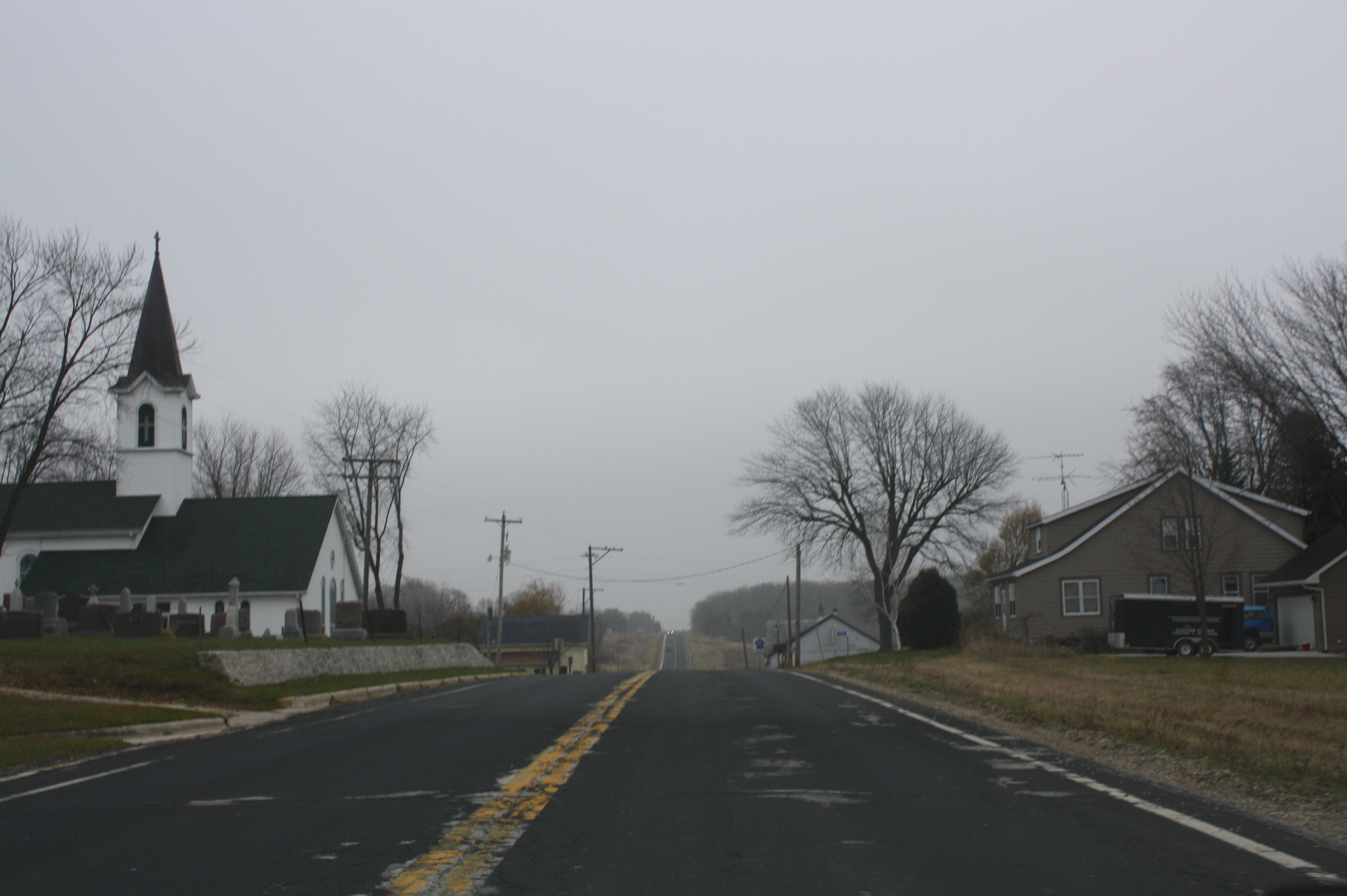
- Looking east at Louis Corners along the former WIS 149

- Location within Wisconsin Location within the United States
- Coordinates: 43°56′07″N 87°57′07″W
- Country: United States
- State: Wisconsin
- County: Manitowoc
- Elevation: 912 ft (278 m)
- Time zone: UTC-6 (Central (CST))
  - Summer (DST): UTC-5 (CDT)
- Area code: 920
- GNIS feature ID: 1568696

Louis Corners is an unincorporated community located in the town of Schleswig, Manitowoc County, Wisconsin, United States. Wisconsin Highway 149 ran through the community before being decommissioned.

== Images ==
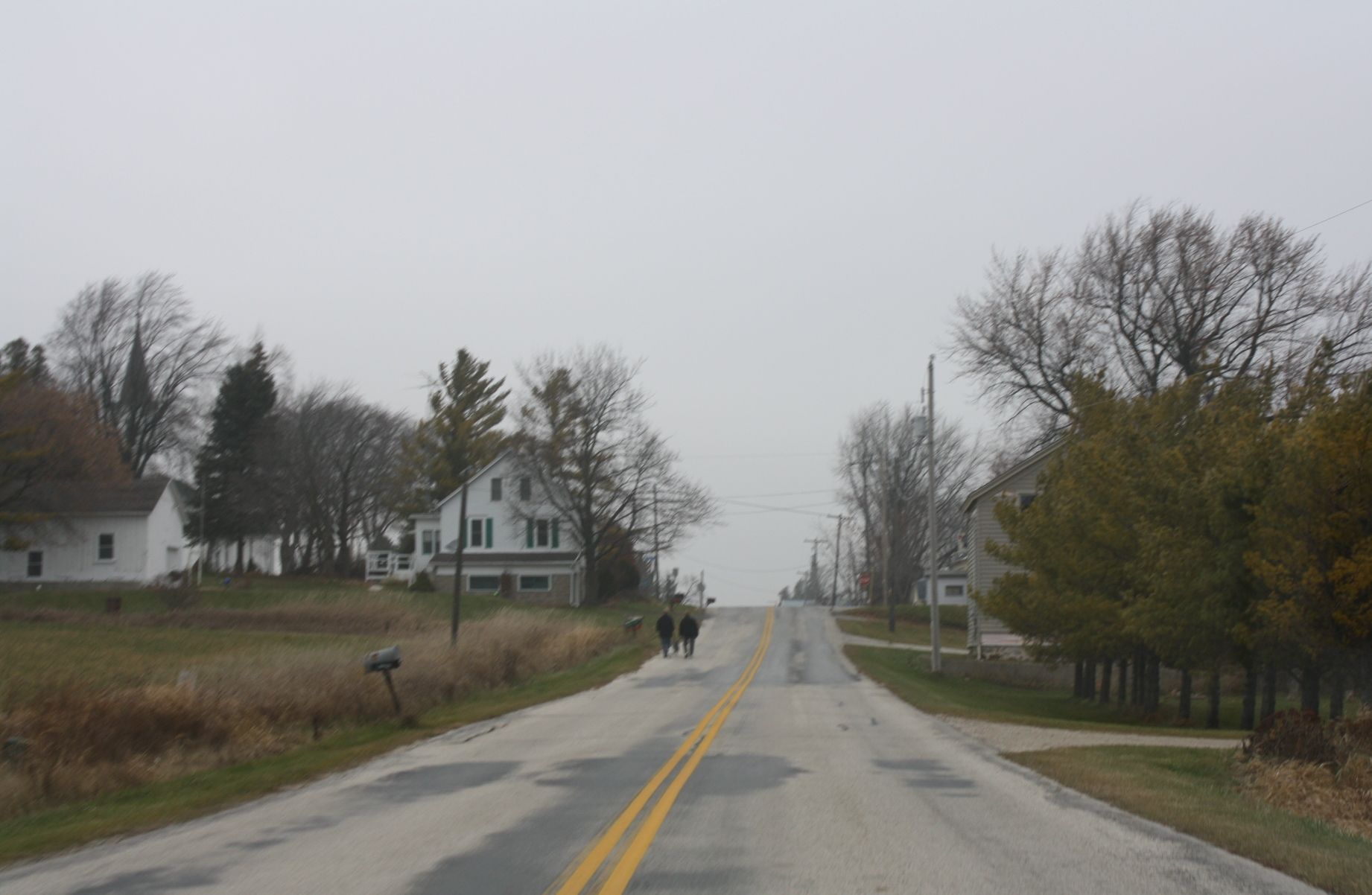
Looking north at Louis Corners

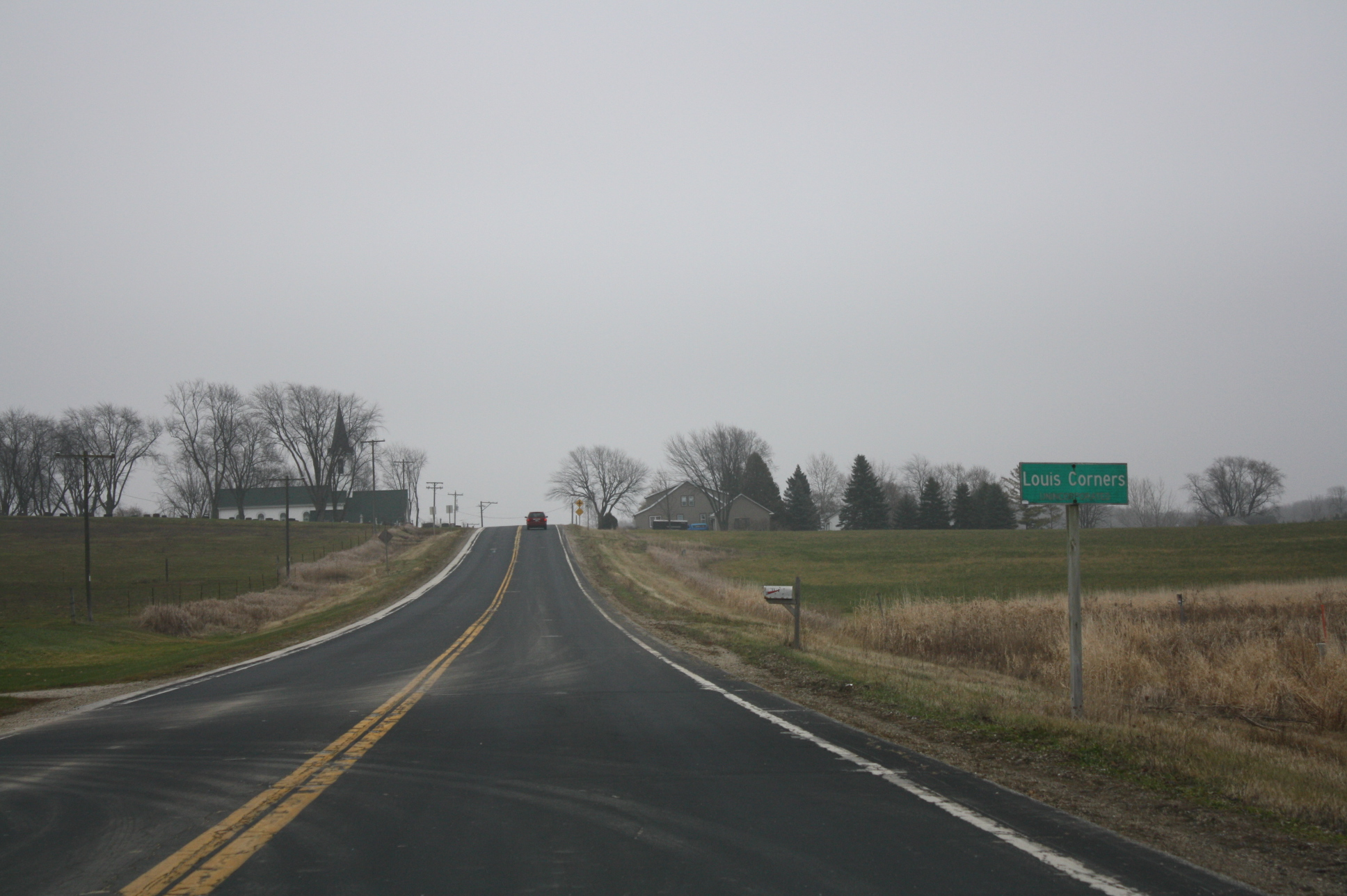
Looking east at the sign for Louis Corners
