= Old Nicolet High School =

- Nicolet High School
- Formerly listed on the U.S. National Register of Historic Places
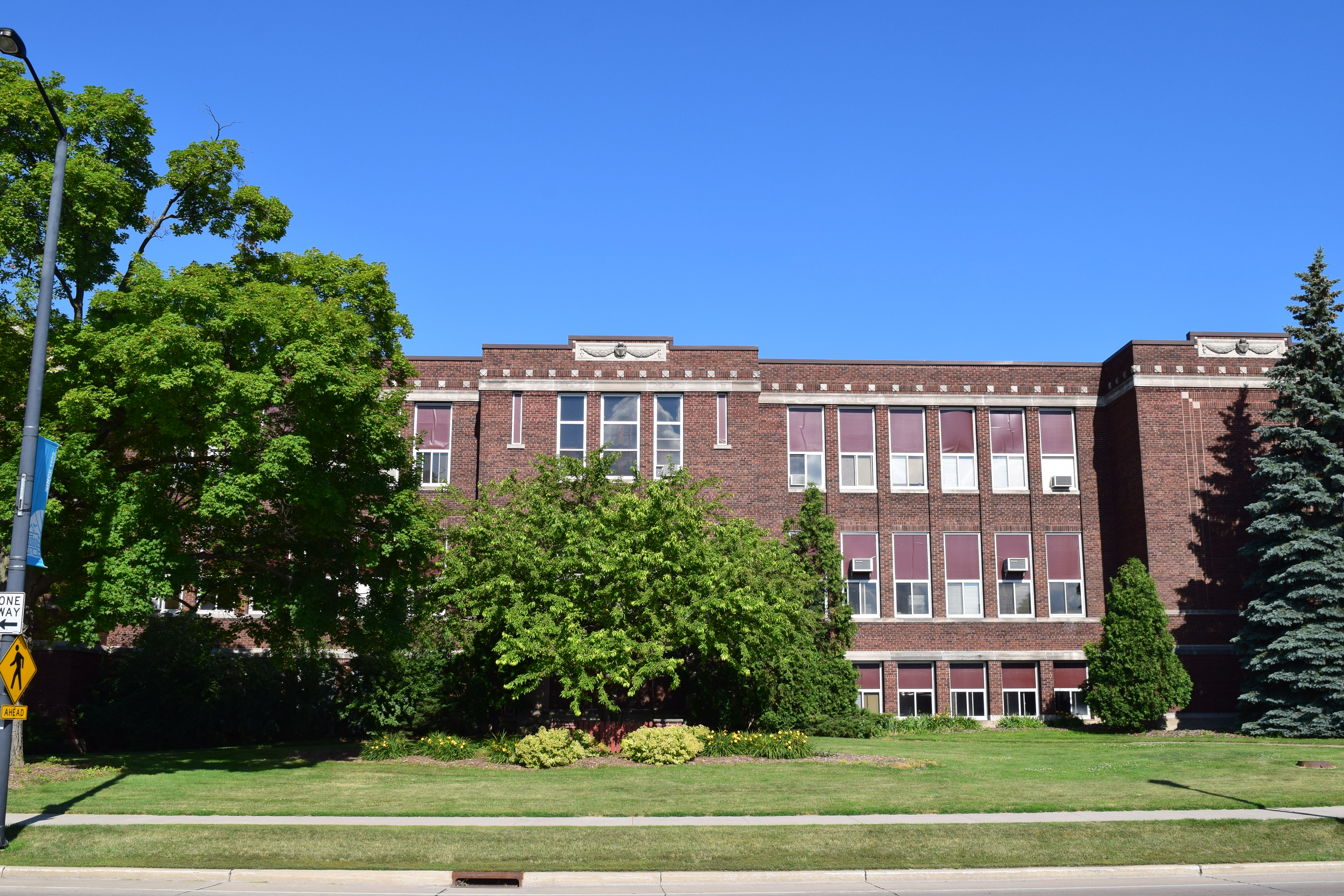
- Old Nicolet High School
- Location: 111 3rd St. De Pere, Wisconsin
- Coordinates: 44°26′48″N 88°04′05″W
- Area: 1.586 acres (0.642 ha)
- Built: 1923
- Architect: Foeller, Schober, and Stephenson
- Architectural style: Neo-Classical Revival
- NRHP reference No.: 15000703

Significant dates
- Added to NRHP: October 15, 2015
- Removed from NRHP: December 18, 2024

The Old Nicolet High School is a historic school located in De Pere, Wisconsin, USA.

== History ==
The building was a public high school until 1958. That year, it was purchased by the Norbertines and it was reopened as the Catholic boys' school Abbot Pennings High School in 1959. In 1990, the building was bought by the nearby Norbertine institution St. Norbert College and has since been used for classrooms and offices. Abbot Pennings High School was closed and consolidated with two other local single-sex Catholic high schools to form the coeducational Notre Dame Academy.

The building was added to the State and the National Register of Historic Places in 2015. It was listed on the National Register as Nicolet High School.
