= Xavier High School (Appleton, Wisconsin) =

High school in Appleton, Wisconsin

St. Francis Xavier High School
- Xavier High School

Location
- 1600 West Prospect Avenue; Appleton, (Outagamie County), Wisconsin 54914-5199; United States; 44°14′56″N 88°25′59″W

Information
- Type: Private
- Religious affiliation: Roman Catholic
- Established: 1959
- Principal: William Welch
- Grades: 9–12
- Gender: Coeducational
- Enrollment: 500
- Colors: Navy Blue & white
- Athletics conference: Bay Conference
- Team name: Hawks
- Yearbook: Xavue
- Affiliation: Catholic Diocese of Green Bay
- Website: www.xaviercatholicschools.org

Xavier High School is a private Catholic secondary school in Appleton, Wisconsin, in the Diocese of Green Bay. It was opened in 1959 by the Institute of the Brothers of the Christian Schools (Christian Brothers) and the Franciscan Sisters of Christian Charity (Manitowoc Franciscans). The school was named in honor of St. Francis Xavier, the patron saint of the Green Bay Diocese. Xavier has been ranked one of the top 50 Catholic high schools in the United States, and one of the top private schools in Wisconsin.

== History ==
Xavier High School was founded in 1959, and originally staffed by Franciscan Sisters and Christian Brothers.

Mike Mauthe was the principal of Xavier High School from 2014 to 2024. William Welch became the school's new principal starting in 2025.

=== 2024 firings ===
In November 2024, Xavier principal Mike Mauthe was fired in the wake of a complaint to the Diocese Office of Safe Environment about a failure to comply with the Diocese of Green Bay's “Our Promise to Protect” policy. (A report was filed with the Appleton Police Department, as required by the state's mandatory reporting laws.) As a result of the investigation into Mauthe, John Ravizza, superintendent of the Diocese' St. Francis Xavier Catholic School System of which the high school is a part, was terminated "because of a failure to meet reporting requirements".

== Athletics ==
=== State Championships ===
- Football: 1962, 1963
- Boys Basketball: 1963, 1995, 2017
- Boys Baseball: 1979
- Boys Track & Field: 1984, 1985
- Boys Golf: 2001, 2008
- Boys Soccer: 2003, 2004, 2006, 2012
- Boys Track: 2017
- Powerlifting: 2018
- Girls Basketball: 1978
- Girls Track & Field: 1992
- Girls Soccer: 2004, 2005, 2008, 2025
- Girls Hockey: 2019, 2020
- Girls Tennis: 2020
- Girls Cross Country: 2022, 2023
- Volleyball: 2022, 2023, 2026
- Girls Flag Football: 2026

=== Athletic conference affiliation history ===
- Fox Valley Catholic Conference (1961-1971)
- Fox Valley Christian Conference (1971-1999)
- Valley 8 Conference (1999-2007)
- Eastern Valley Conference (2007-2015)
- Bay Conference (2015–present)

== Notable alumni ==
- Rocky Bleier (1964) - former NFL running back
- J. P. Hayes (1983) - PGA Tour professional golfer
- Mike Heideman (1966) - college basketball head coach
- Kristine Jarinovska (1997) - Secretary of State, Latvia
- Mee Moua (1988) - Minnesota state senator, first Hmong-American politician
- Greta Van Susteren (1972) - TV journalist
