= St. Mary's Springs Academy =

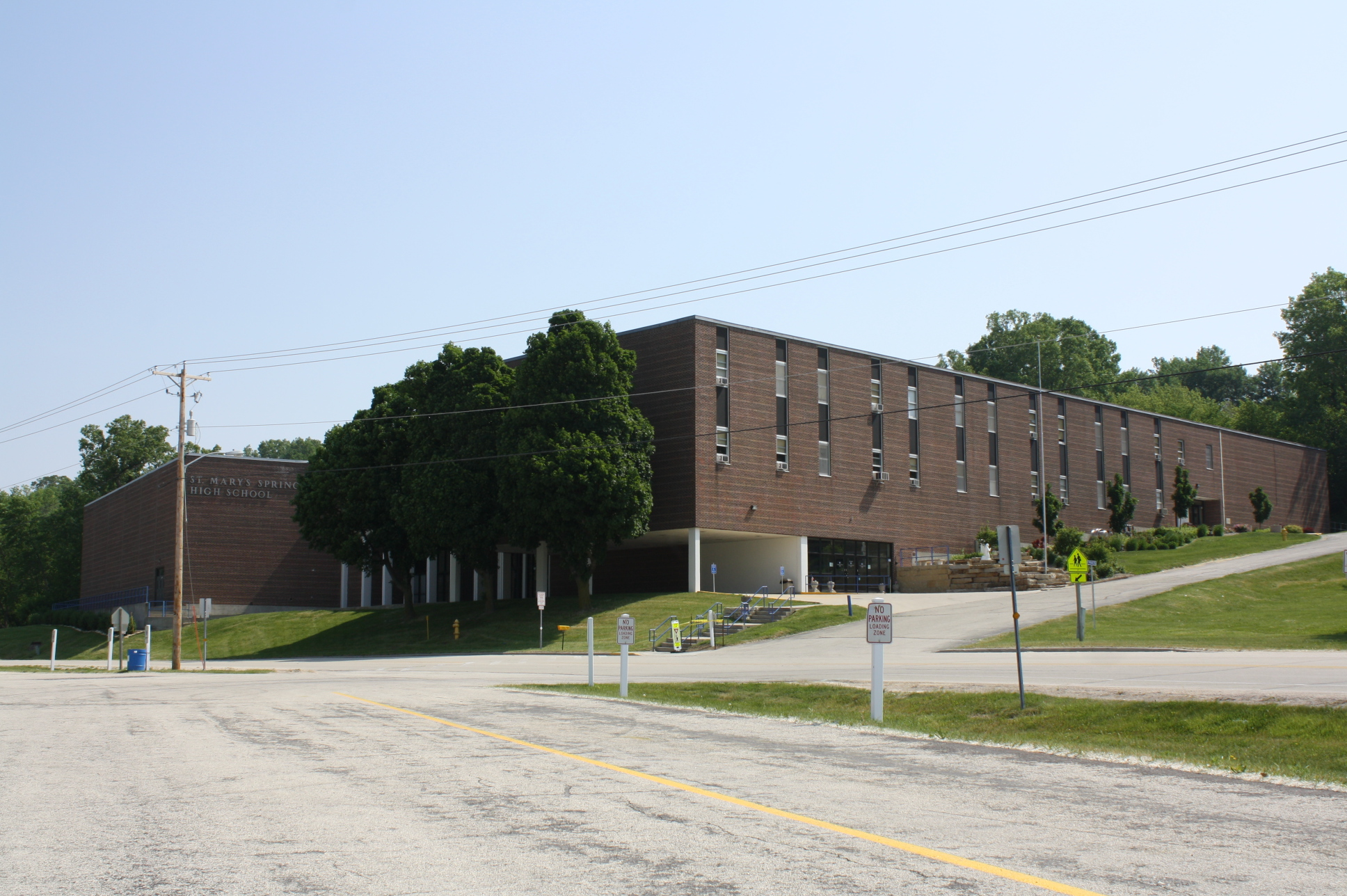
- St. Mary's Springs Academy

Location
- 255 County Road K Fond du Lac, (Fond du Lac County), Wisconsin 54937; United States; 43°47′17″N 88°23′16″W

Information
- Type: Private, Coeducational
- Religious affiliation: Roman Catholic
- Established: 1909
- Principal: Mr O'Keefe
- Grades: K3–12
- Average class size: 18
- Student to teacher ratio: 16:1
- Colors: Royal blue and white
- Athletics conference: Wisconsin Flyway
- Mascot: The Ledger
- Team name: Ledgers
- Newspaper: The Ledger
- Yearbook: Maryledge
- Website: www.smsacademy.org

St. Mary's Springs Academy (SMSA, formerly St. Mary's Springs High School) is a Catholic, private, coeducational system serving grades 3-year-old preschool through high school in Fond du Lac, Wisconsin, associated with the Archdiocese of Milwaukee. It was founded by the Sisters of Saint Agnes in 1909.

== History ==
The Sisters of Saint Agnes came to the site of the school in 1901 to open a sanitarium after money was donated by local businessman Henry Boyle. The first building built on the site in 1901, Boyle Hall, was named in his honor. This building and St. Agnes Hall, immediately to the north of Boyle Hall, were used as a sanitarium until 1909 when the site was changed into a boarding school for girls. The school held its first graduation in 1911. Though run by the Sisters of St. Agnes, it became affiliated with The Catholic University of America in 1915 and then became known as St. Mary's Springs Academy. In 1928, a large school building was constructed to the north of Boyle Hall. In 1939, St. Mary's Springs Academy became co-educational. In 1956, boarding facilities were discontinued.

With increasing enrollment during the 1950s and 1960s, a need arose for another building. Telethons were held to raise money for the construction. In 1970, the school's name was changed to St. Mary's Springs High School after becoming jointly sponsored by the Archdiocese of Milwaukee and the Congregation of the Sisters of St. Agnes. A new academic building was built that year at the north end of the campus, immediately north of the main building. Both buildings held classes until the main building became known as the Administration Building due to dwindling class sizes. Around 2001, the Administration Building was permanently closed due to asbestos being found in the building. In 2005, Boyle Hall, which had been vacant for nearly 25 years, was torn down due to structural problems. The old administration building was vacant until it was razed in 2015 to make way for a proposed preK-12 academic complex.

In 2008, St. Mary's Springs High School was merged with FACES (Fond du Lac Area Catholic Education System) to form a K-12 system. FACES consisted of two campuses, St. Joseph's Primary School and St. Mary's Middle School. The three campuses began operating under the name of St. Mary's Springs Academy. Plans were underway to build a complex combining the Academy due to the aging buildings of the former FACES campus. A campaign, called the Second Century Campaign, was launched to fund building this new complex at the high school location.

At the start of the 2016–2017 academic year, the new St. Mary's Springs Academy complex opened to students in pre-Kindergarten through grade 12. The complex consisted of the academic building (built in 1970) connected to the large new addition. The older portion of the building was completely renovated to make better use of space as well as to update classrooms for modern learning. Grades 6–12 occupy the older portion while pre-Kindergarten through grade 5, as well as administrative offices, occupy the new portion of the building.

The school completed construction of a new turf field in 2021.

The landmark bell tower of the old administration building, which could be viewed from across town, was reconstructed on the site of the new school complex. After plans for the new complex were underway, a separate campaign, called Bring It Back Home, was launched to fund the reconstruction. A bell tower with a similar appearance to the original now sits on The Ledge.

== Athletics ==
=== Championships ===
==== State championships ====
- Boys' basketball: 1993, 1994
- Boys' cross country: 1971
- Girls' cross country: 1992, 1993, 1995, 1996, 1997
- Football: 1983, 1984, 1990, 1991, 1995, 1997, 1998, 1999, 2002, 2009, 2011, 2012, 2014, 2015, 2017, 2018, 2019
- Boys' golf: 1959, 2015, 2016, 2017, 2018
- Boys' hockey: 1981, 1982, 1985, 1986, 1987, 2020, 2021, 2024
- Boys' track: 1975, 1979, 1993, 1996, 1997, 1998, 2000, 2012.
- Baseball: 2016.

==== Conference championships ====
- Boys' cross country: 1971, 1972, 1996, 2000
- Girls' cross country: 1992, 1993, 1994, 1995, 1996, 1997, 1999, 2000, 2001, 2009, 2010
- Football: 1975, 1976, 1977, 1978, 1981, 1983, 1985, 1986, 1987, 1988, 1989, 1990, 1991, 1992, 1993, 1994, 1995, 1996, 1998, 1999, 2000, 2002, 2004, 2008, 2009, 2011, 2012, 2013, 2014, 2015, 2016, 2017, 2018, 2019, 2020, 2023, 2024
- Girls' tennis: 1992
- Volleyball: 1976, 2018, 2021
- Boys' basketball: 1993, 2003, 2021, 2022, 2023, 2025
- Girls' basketball: 2001, 2002
- Boys' hockey: 2011, 2020, 2021, 2023, 2024
- Girls' hockey: 2011
- Baseball: 1983, 1984, 1985, 1987, 1993, 1994, 1995, 2000, 2001, 2004, 2008, 2009
- Golf: 1961, 1971, 1972, 1986, 1992, 1994, 1996, 1998, 2000, 2004, 2005, 2006, 2007, 2008, 2009, 2010, 2011, 2012, 2013, 2015, 2016, 2017, 2018, 2019, 2021, 2022, 2023, 2024, 2025
- Girls' soccer: 2007, 2008
- Softball: 1992
- Boys' track: 1975, 1987, 1988, 1998, 1999, 2000
- Girls' track: 1997, 1998, 1999, 2000, 2011

== Notable former pupils ==
- Warren Braun, Wisconsin politician
- John P. Dobyns, Wisconsin politician
- Jeanna Giese, first unvaccinated survivor of Rabies
- Alejandro Nolasco, Spanish politician
- Billy Schrauth, Tampa Bay Buccaneers guard
