= Lourdes Academy (Oshkosh, Wisconsin) =

Roman Catholic School in Oshkosh, Wisconsin

Lourdes Academy High School
- Lourdes Academia Alta Schola
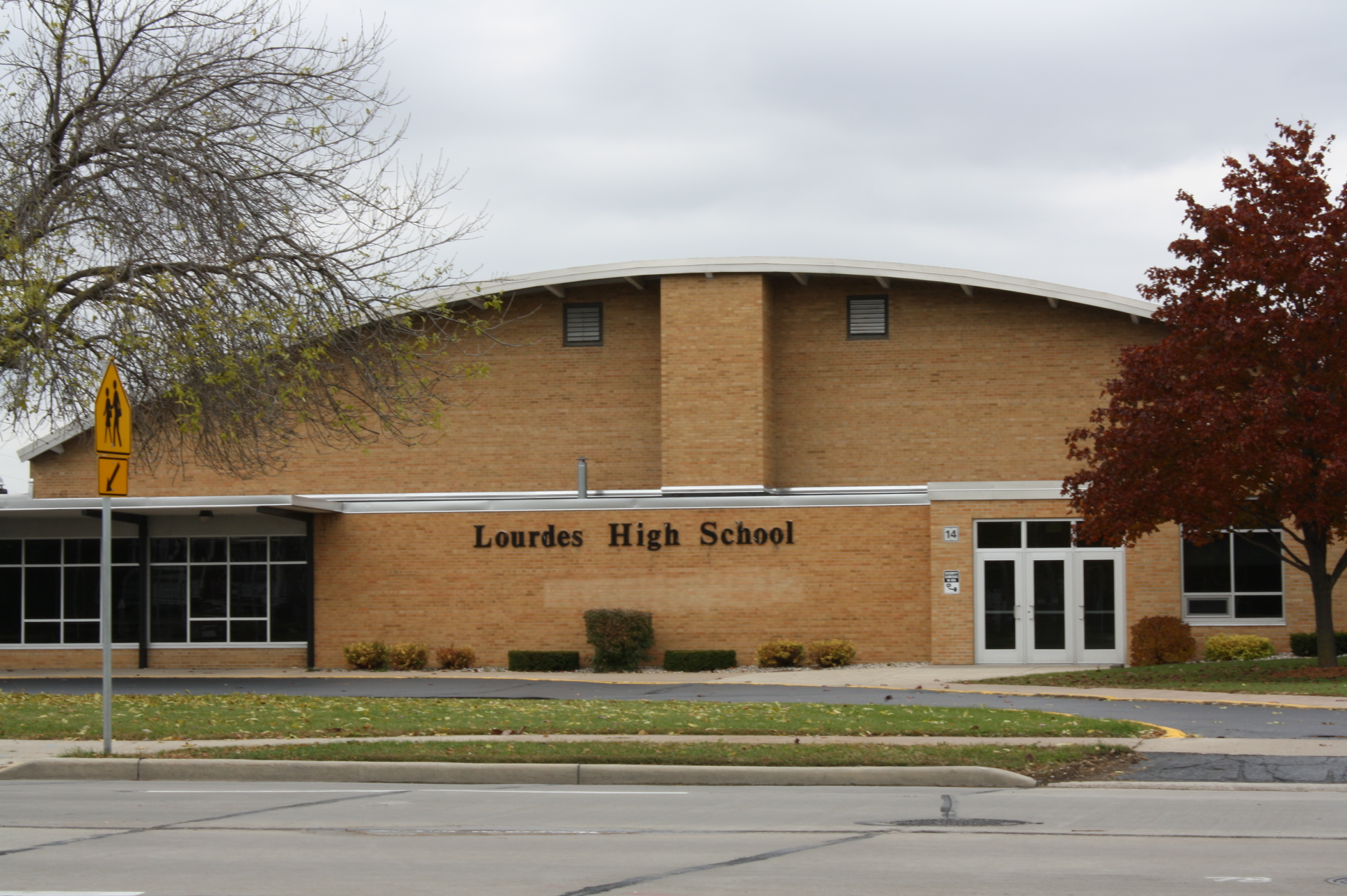
- Looking north at the entrance

Location
- 110 North Sawyer Street; Oshkosh, (Winnebago County), Wisconsin 54902-5657; United States
- Coordinates: 44°1′7″N 88°33′59″W

Information
- Type: Private, Coeducational
- Religious affiliation: Roman Catholic
- Patron saint: Our Lady of Lourdes
- Established: 1959
- President: John Dinegan
- Administrator: Lois Reischl
- Director: Karen Boehm
- Principal: David Mikesell
- Teaching staff: 32
- Grades: 9-12
  - Grade 9: 52
  - Grade 10: 56
  - Grade 11: 60
  - Grade 12: 64
- Average class size: 17
- Education system: Lourdes Academy (formerly Unified Catholic Schools of Oshkosh)
- Campus: Suburban
- Colors: Red white and black
- Slogan: The truth shall set you free
- Fight song: "Hail Lourdes Knights"
- Athletics conference: Trailways
- Sports: Football, Boys Soccer, Girls Tennis, Girls Volleyball, Cross Country, Dance, Swimming, Basketball, Boys Hockey, Wrestling, Baseball Softball, Track and Field, Golf
- Mascot: Knight
- Team name: Knights
- Rival: St. Mary Catholic, Johnson Creek, Deerfield
- Accreditation: North Central Association of Colleges and Schools
- Newspaper: The Shield
- Yearbook: The Crest
- School fees: $75
- Feeder schools: LA Middle School
- Athletic Director: Kevin Wopat
- Website: https://www.lourdesacademyoshkosh.org/

Lourdes Academy High School is a Roman Catholic high school in Oshkosh, Wisconsin, United States. It operates within the Diocese of Green Bay and was established in 1959.

== History ==
The planning and construction, in the late 1950s, of a central Catholic high school represented the combined efforts of six Catholic parishes in Oshkosh, Wisconsin: St. Mary, St. Peter, St. Vincent, Sacred Heart, St. Josaphat, and St. John.

Construction of the school began in September 1958, with the first classes beginning in September 1959. The first year there were 306 freshmen and sophomores (155 girls and 151 boys) enrolled. Boys and girls attended separate classes with the upper floors for girls and lower floors for boys. Some facilities were used by both, including science and chemistry labs, the gymnasium, chapel, cafeteria, and library. The school was known as Lourdes High School and staffed with De La Salle Christian Brothers until 2001.

On August 1, 2012, the Unified Catholic Schools of Oshkosh (which included all of the catholic schools in Oshkosh) merged to become the grades 4K-12 Lourdes Academy. Upon consolidation, Lourdes Academy included the high school, middle school (formerly St. John Neumann) and two elementary school campuses (formerly St. Frances Cabrini and St. Elizabeth Ann Seton). Following the 2017-2018 school year, Lourdes Academy closed the St. France Cabrini campus and consolidated the two elementary schools to the Seton campus. This campus was called Lourdes Academy Elementary.

=== Campus addition ===
The Bill Behring Commons, completed in 2005, is a large open space facing Witzel Avenue. It serves as cafeteria, all-school worship site, and performing arts center. The commons has a large gathering hallway and space with adjoining rest rooms, trophy cases, concession facilities, the athletic directors' office next to it, and staff lounge also next to it. The lobby connects gym facilities, band room and the student commons, and serves as a reception and gathering area. A new gymnasium and a new band classroom were also constructed.

=== One by One Capital Campaign ===
2023 saw the construction of a new high school wing and the renovation of the existing building. The middle school moved into the area formerly occupied by the high school and St. Elizabeth Ann Seton Elementary school was permanently closed to consolidate grades k-12 in the same building.

== Faculty and staff ==
=== High school ===
| Teacher or faculty member | Subject or position |
|---|---|
| Don Dineen | Mathematics |
| Stacy Mains | English |
| Dan Heiser | Mathematics & Physics |
| Kimberly Kroupenske | Social Studies |
| John Ellis | Religion |
| Stephanie Combs | Religion |
| Andrea Jakobs | English |
| Jeffrey Pickron | Social Studies |
| Carrie Gruman-Trinkner | Choir |
| Stacy Smith | Physical Education |
| Michelle Sorenson | Band Director |
| Zoe Schlabach | Physical Education |
| Carrie Tyriver | Administrative Assistant |
| Nikki Dahlke | Spanish |
| Mary Geffers | Learning Specialist |
| Carol Morris | Pastoral Youth Minister |
