= St. Mary Catholic High School (Neenah, Wisconsin) =

Private school in Wisconsin, United States

Location
- 1050 Zephyr Drive; Neenah, (Winnebago County), Wisconsin 54956-1389; United States; 44°12′45″N 88°29′1″W

Information
- Type: Private, Coeducational
- Religious affiliation: Roman Catholic
- Established: 1927
- President: Dan McKenna
- Grades: 9–12
- Colors: Columbia blue, gold and navy blue
- Athletics conference: The Big East
- Mascot: The Zephyr Train
- Team name: Zephyrs
- Accreditation: AdvancED
- Yearbook: The Renard
- Tuition: $8400
- Website: https://www.smcatholicschools.org/academics/high-school

St. Mary Catholic High School (formerly St. Mary Central High School) is a private, Roman Catholic high school in Fox Crossing, Wisconsin, near Neenah. It operates within the Diocese of Green Bay. It is the only high school in the St. Mary Catholic Schools system (formerly Twin City Catholic Educational System), which also operates three elementary schools and one middle school.

== History ==
St. Mary Catholic Church in Menasha opened an elementary school in the late nineteenth-century, adding high-school grades when opening a new building in 1928. A three-story building, it contained a gymnasium, cafeteria, and all the other typical amenities associated with a high school of the day. The wings of the building housed the elementary school. There were additions to the building in 1952 and 1962. The school stayed open until the spring of 1997 when a new building was erected in the Town of Menasha, now Fox Crossing. Parts of the old high school were demolished to make way for additions to the grade school.

The new building opened in the fall of 1997. It includes a small chapel, three computer labs, one distance-learning lab, traditional classrooms, a cafeteria with a stage, and a significantly larger gymnasium. Since 1997, additional facilities have been added, including the EEEC Energy Center; Jane's Woods, a two-acre wildlife sanctuary; and Zephyr Fields, a new football/soccer stadium. In 2013, the school completed the construction of the Jane Bergstrom Fine Arts Education Center, which includes a 495-seat performance theater and a 115-seat forensic theater.

== Sports ==
The school won several championships during its association with WISAA (Wisconsin Independent School Athletic Association). However, in the early 2000s WISAA dissolved and the school entered the Olympian Conference in the Wisconsin Interscholastic Athletic Association (WIAA).

Since their entrance in the WIAA, the school has won the following state titles:

- Division 3 Women's Tennis Singles State Championship (3 times)
- Division 3 Men's Tennis Singles State Championship
- Division 3 Men's Soccer State Championship(Runner-up)
- Division 3 Women's Soccer State Championship
- Division 3 Women's Soccer State Championship (Runner-up)
- Division 3 Men's Baseball State Championship(Runner-up) (3 times)
- Division 3 Men's Baseball State Championship
- Division 4 Women's Basketball State Championship
- Division 4 Women's Basketball State Championship (Runner-up)

== SMCS ==
The school belongs to St. Mary Catholic Schools, a school system comprising three grade schools, one middle school, and one high school in Neenah/Menasha/Fox Crossing:

- St. Mary Elementary School
- St. Margaret Mary Elementary School
- St. Gabriel Elementary School
- St. Mary Catholic Middle School (formerly Seton Catholic Middle School)
