= Fox Valley Tri-County League =

Wisconsin high school athletic conference (1924–1970)

The Fox Valley Tri-County League is a former high school athletic conference in Wisconsin, founded in 1924 and dissolved in 1970. Its membership was concentrated in the southern Fox River watershed and all public school members belonged to the Wisconsin Interscholastic Athletic Association.

== History ==
=== 1924–1939 ===
Location of Original Fox Valley Tri-County League Members

The Fox Valley Tri-County League, also known by its original name of the Tri-County Interscholastic Association, was founded in 1924 by eight small high schools in east central Wisconsin (Brandon, Campbellsport, Glenbeulah, Kewaskum, Lomira, Oakfield, Rosendale and Slinger). Despite the Tri-County moniker, original league members were located in four Wisconsin counties (Dodge, Fond du Lac, Sheboygan and Washington). The number of members decreased to seven in 1928 when Glenbeulah left to join the Kettle Moraine Conference. North Fond du Lac joined the Fox Valley Tri-County League in 1929, bringing the loop back up to eight member schools. Slinger left the conference in 1935 to join the 4-C Conference, bringing membership down to seven schools. In 1939, the Fox Valley Tri-County League started sponsorship of six-man football, with all seven members participating in the first season.

=== 1939–1962 ===
By the late 1940s, North Fond du Lac and Rosendale (who ended their program) had both dropped out of the conference as football members, leaving the conference with five football-playing schools. Green Lake, a member of the 7-C Conference for other sports, joined in 1949 for football and played for three seasons until the formation of the Central Lakes Conference in 1952. North Fond du Lac, who rejoined the conference for football in 1951, took their place. They, along with all other league members, switched from six-man to eight-man football for the 1952 football season. 1955, Hustisford High School joined the Fox Valley Tri-County League after nearly two decades of competing as an independent, and Random Lake of the Kettle Moraine Conference joined for football when the conference dropped sponsorship of the sport. Random Lake rejoined the KMC when the conference reinstated football as a competitive sport for the 1958 season. The Fox Valley Tri-County League experienced a three-member loss in 1958 when the new Scenic Moraine Conference was formed, with three of the largest high schools in the conference (Campbellsport, Kewaskum and North Fond du Lac) leaving to join. Rosendale reinstated their football program in 1958, and Lowell-Reeseville formed their first team, joining the conference for football a year before full membership was attained. Three schools joined as full members in 1959: Fox Lake (formerly of the Dual County Conference), Green Lake (a former football-only member who previously competed in the Central Lakes Conference) and Lowell-Reeseville.

=== 1962–1970 ===
Location of Final Fox Valley Tri-County League Members

Like many conferences in rural areas during the 1950s and 1960s, consolidation of school districts had a great effect on conference affiliation. Fox Lake was the first conference member affected, as they left after consolidating with Waupun in 1962. Winnebago Lutheran Academy would become the first private school to join the Fox Valley Tri-County League: first as a football-only member for the 1962 and 1963 seasons, and then as a full member in 1964 after the dissolution of the short-lived Badger Lutheran Conference. The conference also made the transition from eight-man to eleven-man football for the 1963 football season. Two consolidations further whittled away conference membership in 1969. Brandon and Rosendale agreed to a merger of their two districts, and they combined to form a single athletic program until Laconia High School was completed in 1972. In addition, Lowell-Reeseville consolidated with Juneau High School to form the new Dodgeland High School. Rosendale-Brandon remained in the Fox Valley Tri-County League for its first season, while Dodgeland took Juneau's spot in the Eastern Suburban Conference. St. Lawrence Seminary in Mount Calvary was added to the conference that year to put membership back up to seven schools. They would only play one season in the Fox Valley Tri-County League, as the conference disbanded in 1970. Three members (Lomira, Oakfield and Rosendale-Brandon) became charter members of the Flyway Conference, two schools (St. Lawrence Seminary and Winnebago Lutheran) joined the new Bay-Lakes Conference, Green Lake joined the Dual County Conference and Hustisford joined the Eastern Suburban Conference.

== Conference membership history ==
=== Final members ===
School	Location	Affiliation	Mascot	Colors	Joined	Left	Conference Joined	Current Conference
Green Lake	Green Lake, WI	Public	Lakers		1959	1970	Dual County	Trailways (co-op with Princeton)
Hustisford	Hustisford, WI	Public	Falcons		1955	1970	Eastern Suburban	Trailways
Lomira	Lomira, WI	Public	Lions		1924	1970	Flyway	Wisconsin Flyway
Oakfield	Oakfield, WI	Public	Oaks		1924	1970	Flyway	Trailways
Rosendale-Brandon	Rosendale, WI	Public	Spartans		1969	1970	Flyway	Wisconsin Flyway
St. Lawrence Seminary	Mount Calvary, WI	Private (Catholic, Capuchin)	Hilltoppers		1969	1970	Bay-Lakes	Wisconsin Flyway
Winnebago Lutheran	Fond du Lac, WI	Private (Lutheran, WELS)	Vikings		1964	1970	Bay-Lakes	Wisconsin Flyway

=== Previous members ===
School	Location	Affiliation	Mascot	Colors	Joined	Left	Conference Joined	Current Conference
Brandon	Brandon, WI	Public	Tanagers		1924	1969	Closed (consolidated into Laconia)	
Campbellsport	Campbellsport, WI	Public	Cougars		1924	1958	Scenic Moraine	Wisconsin Flyway
Fox Lake	Fox Lake, WI	Public	Lakers		1959	1962	Closed (consolidated into Waupun)	
Glenbeulah	Glenbeulah, WI	Public	Boosters		1924	1928	Kettle Moraine	Closed in 1957 (consolidated into Elkhart Lake-Glenbeulah)
Kewaskum	Kewaskum, WI	Public	Indians		1924	1958	Scenic Moraine	Glacier Trails
Lowell-Reeseville	Reeseville, WI	Public	Cardinals		1959	1969	Closed (consolidated into Dodgeland)	
North Fond du Lac	North Fond du Lac, WI	Public	Orioles		1929	1958	Scenic Moraine	Wisconsin Flyway
Rosendale	Rosendale, WI	Public	Dalers		1924	1969	Closed (consolidated into Laconia)	
Slinger	Slinger, WI	Public	Redmen		1924	1935	4-C	North Shore

=== Football-only members ===
School	Location	Affiliation	Mascot	Colors	Seasons	Primary Conference
Green Lake	Green Lake, WI	Public	Lakers		1949-1951	7-C
Random Lake	Random Lake, WI	Public	Rams		1955-1957	Kettle Moraine
Lowell-Reeseville	Reeseville, WI	Public	Cardinals		1958	Independent
Winnebago Lutheran	Fond du Lac, WI	Private (Lutheran, WELS)	Vikings		1962-1963	Badger Lutheran

== List of state champions ==
=== Fall sports ===
None

=== Winter sports ===
None

=== Spring sports ===
Boys Track & Field
School	Year	Division
North Fond du Lac	1942	Class C
North Fond du Lac	1943	Class C
North Fond du Lac	1944	Class C
North Fond du Lac	1945	Class C

== List of conference champions ==
=== Boys Basketball ===
School	Quantity	Years
Oakfield	9	1938, 1945, 1960, 1961, 1962, 1963, 1968, 1969, 1970
Kewaskum	8	1939, 1940, 1946, 1947, 1948, 1949, 1953, 1956
Rosendale	6	1942, 1944, 1945, 1958, 1959, 1966
Campbellsport	4	1941, 1950, 1951, 1954
North Fond du Lac	3	1943, 1952, 1957
Lomira	2	1965, 1967
Brandon	1	1955
Green Lake	1	1964
Fox Lake	0	
Glenbeulah	0	
Hustisford	0	
Lowell-Reeseville	0	
Rosendale-Brandon	0	
Slinger	0	
St. Lawrence Seminary	0	
Winnebago Lutheran	0	
Champions from 1925 to 1937 unknown

=== Football ===
School	Quantity	Years
Kewaskum	7	1939, 1943, 1944, 1945, 1946, 1948, 1955
North Fond du Lac	6	1940, 1941, 1942, 1951, 1956, 1957
Oakfield	6	1958, 1961, 1962, 1963, 1967, 1969
Brandon	4	1954, 1959, 1960, 1964
Campbellsport	4	1949, 1950, 1952, 1953
Lomira	4	1947, 1965, 1966, 1968
Fox Lake	0	
Green Lake	0	
Hustisford	0	
Lowell-Reeseville	0	
Random Lake	0	
Rosendale	0	
Rosendale-Brandon	0	
St. Lawrence Seminary	0	
Winnebago Lutheran	0	
