= Flyway Conference =

Wisconsin high school athletic conference (1970-2001)

The Flyway Conference is a former high school athletic conference with its membership concentrated in east central Wisconsin. Founded in 1970 and disbanded in 2001, all of its members were affiliated with the Wisconsin Interscholastic Athletic Association.

== History ==
=== 1970–1999 ===
Location of Original Flyway Conference Members

The Flyway Conference was formed in 1970 by seven small- to medium-sized high schools in the lower Fox River Valley in east central Wisconsin. Three schools came from the disbanded Fox Valley Tri-County League (Laconia, Lomira and Oakfield), two joined from the Scenic Moraine Conference (Campbellsport and North Fond du Lac), and one school each came from the Eastern Suburban Conference (Dodgeland) and the Little Ten Conference (Horicon) after the latter's dissolution. Membership remained relatively stable through the history of the conference with few changes in the conference's first decade. Markesan joined the Flyway in 1977 to create an eight-member circuit, and in 1980, Dodgeland left to rejoin the Eastern Suburban Conference with Mayville taking its place from the Scenic Moraine Conference. With the exception of Oakfield joining the Central Lakeshore Conference as a football-only member in 1987 and Wautoma's entry as a football-only member in 1995, the Flyway Conference continued as an eight-school loop for nineteen seasons before any further realignment for most sports.

=== 1999–2001 ===
Location of Final Flyway Conference Members

In 1999, two schools left to join the East Central Conference (Laconia and Markesan) along with Campbellsport's departure to the Eastern Wisconsin Conference. To counter the losses, four private schools joined as a result of the pending WIAA/WISAA merger set to be finalized in 2000. Three schools joined from the Midwest Classic Conference (Central Wisconsin Christian in Waupun, St. Lawrence Seminary in Mount Calvary and Winnebago Lutheran Academy in Fond du Lac) and St. Mary's Springs Academy in Fond du Lac joined from the former Fox Valley Christian Conference. Laconia and Markesan stayed on as football-only members for the last two seasons of the conference to counter the loss of Mayville and St. Mary's Springs to the East Central Conference for that sport. 2001 saw the end of the Flyway Conference as the merger agreement originally reached two years prior with the East Central Conference was finalized. The East Central Flyway Conference would begin play in the 2001-02 school year.

== Conference membership history ==
=== Final members ===
School	Location	Affiliation	Mascot	Colors	Joined	Left	Conference Joined	Current Conference
Central Wisconsin Christian	Waupun, WI	Private (Reformed)	Crusaders		1999	2001	East Central Flyway	Trailways
Horicon	Horicon, WI	Public	Marshmen		1970	2001	East Central Flyway	Trailways
Lomira	Lomira, WI	Public	Lions		1970	2001	East Central Flyway	Wisconsin Flyway
Mayville	Mayville, WI	Public	Cardinals		1980	2001	East Central Flyway	Wisconsin Flyway
North Fond du Lac	North Fond du Lac, WI	Public	Orioles		1970	2001	East Central Flyway	Wisconsin Flyway
Oakfield	Oakfield, WI	Public	Oaks		1970	2001	East Central Flyway	Trailways
St. Lawrence Seminary	Mount Calvary, WI	Private (Catholic, Capuchin)	Hilltoppers		1999	2001	East Central Flyway	Independent
St. Mary's Springs	Fond du Lac, WI	Private (Catholic)	Ledgers		1999	2001	East Central Flyway	Wisconsin Flyway
Winnebago Lutheran	Fond du Lac, WI	Private (Lutheran, WELS)	Vikings		1999	2001	East Central Flyway	Wisconsin Flyway

=== Previous members ===
School	Location	Affiliation	Mascot	Colors	Joined	Left	Conference Joined	Current Conference
Campbellsport	Campbellsport, WI	Public	Cougars		1970	1999	Eastern Wisconsin	Wisconsin Flyway
Dodgeland	Juneau, WI	Public	Trojans		1970	1980	Eastern Suburban	Trailways
Laconia	Rosendale, WI	Public	Spartans		1970	1999	East Central	Wisconsin Flyway
Markesan	Markesan, WI	Public	Hornets		1977	1999	East Central	Trailways

=== Football-only members ===
School	Location	Affiliation	Mascot	Colors	Seasons	Primary Conference
Wautoma	Wautoma, WI	Public	Hornets		1995-1998	East Central
Laconia	Rosendale, WI	Public	Spartans		1999-2000	East Central
Markesan	Markesan, WI	Public	Hornets		1999-2000	East Central

== List of state champions ==
=== Fall sports ===
Boys Cross Country
School	Year	Division
Campbellsport	1972	Medium Schools

Girls Cross Country
School	Year	Division
Mayville	1992	Division 2
Mayville	1993	Division 2

Football
School	Year	Division
Mayville	1994	Division 4

Girls Volleyball
School	Year	Division
Laconia	1998	Division 3

=== Winter sports ===
Boys Basketball
School	Year	Division
Mayville	1983	Class B
Markesan	1994	Division 3
Markesan	1996	Division 3

Girls Basketball
School	Year	Division
Oakfield	1979	Class C
Lomira	1991	Division 3
North Fond du Lac	1997	Division 3
North Fond du Lac	2000	Division 3

Boys Wrestling
School	Year	Division
Campbellsport	1980	Class B

=== Spring sports ===
Baseball
School	Year	Division
Oakfield	1984	Class C
Oakfield	1986	Class C
Lomira	1991	Division 3

Softball
School	Year	Division
Oakfield	1997	Division 3
Mayville	1999	Division 2

== List of conference champions ==
=== Boys Basketball ===
School	Quantity	Years
Mayville	10	1981, 1982, 1983, 1984, 1985, 1986, 1991, 1992, 1993, 1995
Markesan	9	1978, 1979, 1980, 1986, 1987, 1991, 1994, 1996, 1998
Oakfield	7	1971, 1972, 1974, 1975, 1976, 1977, 1995
Campbellsport	6	1977, 1988, 1989, 1990, 1993, 1999
Laconia	2	1980, 1997
Lomira	2	1985, 2000
North Fond du Lac	2	1973, 2001
Dodgeland	1	1973
Horicon	1	1975
Central Wisconsin Christian	0	
St. Lawrence Seminary	0	
St. Mary's Springs	0	
Winnebago Lutheran	0	

=== Girls Basketball ===
School	Quantity	Years
Markesan	9	1981, 1986, 1988, 1989, 1991, 1992, 1993, 1995, 1998
Mayville	9	1981, 1982, 1984, 1985, 1990, 1991, 1993, 1994, 1995
North Fond du Lac	6	1977, 1996, 1997, 1998, 1999, 2000
Oakfield	5	1978, 1979, 1986, 1987, 1988
Laconia	3	1980, 1981, 1983
Lomira	2	1980, 1993
St. Mary's Springs	1	2001
Campbellsport	0	
Central Wisconsin Christian	0	
Dodgeland	0	
Horicon	0	
Winnebago Lutheran	0	

=== Football ===
School	Quantity	Years
Mayville	14	1980, 1981, 1982, 1983, 1985, 1987, 1988, 1989, 1991, 1992, 1993, 1994, 1996, 1998
Horicon	6	1970, 1971, 1975, 1976, 1977, 1990
Lomira	4	1974, 1981, 1984, 1997
Markesan	4	1979, 1986, 1998, 1999
Laconia	3	1995, 1997, 2000
Dodgeland	2	1972, 1978
North Fond du Lac	2	1972, 1973
Campbellsport	1	1979
Oakfield	0	
Wautoma	0	
Winnebago Lutheran	0	
