= East Central Flyway Conference =

Wisconsin high school athletic conference (2001-2007)

The East Central Flyway Conference is a former high school athletic conference in Wisconsin, competing from 2001 to 2007. All members belonged to the Wisconsin Interscholastic Athletic Association.

== History ==
Location of Original East Central Flyway Conference Members

The East Central Flyway Conference was created in 2001 from a merger of two previously established conferences for small schools in east central Wisconsin. Eight members (Berlin, Laconia, Lourdes Academy in Oshkosh, Markesan, Omro, Ripon, Wautoma and Winneconne) were formerly in the East Central Conference and nine schools came from the Flyway Conference (Central Wisconsin Christian in Waupun, Horicon, Lomira, Mayville, North Fond du Lac, Oakfield, St. Lawrence Seminary in Mount Calvary, and St. Mary’s Springs and Winnebago Lutheran, both out of Fond du Lac). The conference was separated into two divisions with the ECC schools forming the Lakes Division and the Flyway members comprising the Rivers Division:

Lakes Division	Rivers Division
Berlin	Central Wisconsin Christian
Laconia	Horicon
Lourdes Academy	Lomira
Markesan	Mayville
Omro	North Fond du Lac
Ripon	Oakfield
Wautoma	St. Lawrence Seminary
Winneconne	St. Mary’s Springs
	Winnebago Lutheran

The first membership changes occurred in 2004, when Central Wisconsin Christian and St. Lawrence Seminary left the East Central Flyway. Central Wisconsin Christian joined the Trailways Conference while St. Lawrence became an independent. Waupun, formerly of the Wisconsin Little Ten Conference, joined the Lakes Division with Laconia moving over to the Rivers Division:

Lakes Division	Rivers Division
Berlin	Horicon
Lourdes Academy	Laconia
Markesan	Lomira
Omro	Mayville
Ripon	North Fond du Lac
Waupun	Oakfield
Wautoma	St. Mary’s Springs
Winneconne	Winnebago Lutheran

The most significant change came two years later when ten schools left the conference. Six schools from the Rivers Division (Horicon, Laconia, Lomira, Mayville, North Fond du Lac and St. Mary’s Springs) joined with Kettle Moraine Lutheran in Jackson in forming the Wisconsin Flyway Conference, three schools (Lourdes Academy, Markesan and Oakfield) became members of the Trailways Conference, and Wautoma joined the South Central Conference. The remaining six schools continued competition for one more season before disbanding in 2007. Four schools (Berlin, Omro, Ripon and Winneconne) became charter members of the Eastern Valley Conference, Waupun was accepted into the Eastern Wisconsin Conference and Winnebago Lutheran joined the Wisconsin Flyway Conference.

=== Football ===
For football, the East Central Flyway Conference was partitioned into the Lakes and Rivers divisions just like it was for other sports, with a few differences in alignment. Mayville and St. Mary's Springs swapped divisions with Laconia, Lourdes Academy and Markesan, and Waupun was a football-only member of the conference until 2004, when they left the Wisconsin Little Ten Conference to become an all-sport member of the ECFC. Central Wisconsin Christian and St. Lawrence Seminary did not sponsor football and, therefore, did not participate:

Lakes Division	Rivers Division
Berlin	Horicon
Mayville	Laconia
Omro	Lomira
Ripon	Lourdes Academy
St. Mary's Springs	Markesan
Waupun	North Fond du Lac
Wautoma	Oakfield
Winneconne	Winnebago Lutheran

For the 2003 football season, the conference lost Lourdes Academy to the Midwest Classic Conference and Oakfield to the large-school division of the Trailways Conference. St. Mary's Springs moved over to the Rivers Division to keep an even seven members per division until the formation of the Wisconsin Flyway Conference broke up ECFC membership in 2006.

== Conference membership history ==
=== Final members ===
School	Location	Affiliation	Mascot	Colors	Joined	Left	Conference Joined	Current Conference
Berlin	Berlin, WI	Public	Indians		2001	2007	Eastern Valley	South Central
Omro	Omro, WI	Public	Foxes		2001	2007	Eastern Valley	Wisconsin Flyway
Ripon	Ripon, WI	Public	Tigers		2001	2007	Eastern Valley	South Central
Waupun	Waupun, WI	Public	Warriors		2004	2007	Eastern Wisconsin	Capitol
Winnebago Lutheran	Fond du Lac, WI	Private (Lutheran, WELS)	Vikings		2001	2007	Wisconsin Flyway	
Winneconne	Winneconne, WI	Public	Wolves		2001	2007	Eastern Valley	Bay

=== Previous members ===
School	Location	Affiliation	Mascot	Colors	Joined	Left	Conference Joined	Current Conference
Central Wisconsin Christian	Waupun, WI	Private (Reformed)	Crusaders		2001	2004	Trailways	
Horicon	Horicon, WI	Public	Marshmen		2001	2006	Wisconsin Flyway	Trailways
Laconia	Rosendale, WI	Public	Spartans		2001	2006	East Central	
Lomira	Lomira, WI	Public	Lions		2001	2006	Wisconsin Flyway	
Lourdes Academy	Oshkosh, WI	Private (Catholic)	Knights		2001	2006	Trailways	
Markesan	Markesan, WI	Public	Hornets		2001	2006	Trailways	
Mayville	Mayville, WI	Public	Cardinals		2001	2006	Wisconsin Flyway	
North Fond du Lac	North Fond du Lac, WI	Public	Orioles		2001	2006	Wisconsin Flyway	
Oakfield	Oakfield, WI	Public	Oaks		2001	2006	Trailways	
St. Lawrence Seminary	Mount Calvary, WI	Private (Catholic, Capuchin)	Hilltoppers		2001	2004	Independent	
St. Mary's Springs	Fond du Lac, WI	Private (Catholic)	Ledgers		2001	2006	Wisconsin Flyway	
Wautoma	Wautoma, WI	Public	Hornets		2001	2006	South Central	

=== Football-only members ===
School	Location	Affiliation	Mascot	Colors	Seasons	Primary Conference
Waupun	Waupun, WI	Public	Warriors		2001-2003	Wisconsin Little Ten

== Membership timeline ==
=== Full members ===
Lakes Division Rivers Division

=== Football members ===
Lakes Division Rivers Division

== List of state champions ==
=== Fall sports ===
Football
School	Year	Division
St. Mary's Springs	2002	Division 6

Girls Volleyball
School	Year	Division
Waupun	2004	Division 2
Waupun	2005	Division 2

=== Winter sports ===
None

=== Spring sports ===
Baseball
School	Year	Division
Waupun	2007	Division 2

Softball
School	Year	Division
Horicon	2002	Division 3
Horicon	2003	Division 3

Boys Track & Field
School	Year	Division
Ripon	2006	Division 2

== List of conference champions ==
=== Boys Basketball ===
School	Quantity	Years
Omro	3	2002, 2004, 2005
Ripon	3	2001, 2003, 2006
Mayville	2	2002, 2005
Winneconne	2	2003, 2005
Berlin	1	2004
Horicon	1	2006
North Fond du Lac	1	2004
St. Mary's Springs	1	2003
Waupun	1	2007
Central Wisconsin Christian	0	
Laconia	0	
Lomira	0	
Lourdes Academy	0	
Markesan	0	
Oakfield	0	
St. Lawrence Seminary	0	
Wautoma	0	
Winnebago Lutheran	0	

=== Girls Basketball ===
School	Quantity	Years
Laconia	3	2002, 2003, 2004
Lomira	2	2004, 2005
Markesan	2	2003, 2005
Ripon	2	2006, 2007
North Fond du Lac	1	2006
St. Mary's Springs	1	2002
Winnebago Lutheran	1	2003
Berlin	0	
Central Wisconsin Christian	0	
Horicon	0	
Lourdes Academy	0	
Mayville	0	
Oakfield	0	
Omro	0	
Waupun	0	
Wautoma	0	
Winneconne	0	

=== Football ===
School	Quantity	Years
Ripon	3	2003, 2004, 2005
Winnebago Lutheran	3	2003, 2004, 2005
Lomira	2	2002, 2004
Mayville	2	2001, 2004
St. Mary's Springs	2	2002, 2004
Horicon	1	2005
Laconia	1	2001
Markesan	1	2005
North Fond du Lac	1	2002
Waupun	1	2006
Berlin	0	
Lourdes Academy	0	
Oakfield	0	
Omro	0	
Wautoma	0	
Winneconne	0	
