= Wisconsin Flyway Conference =

Wisconsin high school athletic conference

The Wisconsin Flyway Conference is a high school athletic conference with its membership concentrated in east central Wisconsin. It was founded in 2006 and all members belong to the Wisconsin Interscholastic Athletic Association.

== History ==
The Wisconsin Flyway Conference was formed in 2006, the result of a split of six schools from the East Central Flyway Conference (Horicon, Laconia, Lomira, Mayville, North Fond du Lac and St. Mary's Springs). These schools were previously in the conference's Rivers Division and were members of the original Flyway Conference before its merger with the East Central Conference. Kettle Moraine Lutheran in Jackson was the seventh original member of the Wisconsin Flyway Conference, having been displaced by the closing of the Parkland Conference the year prior. Winnebago Lutheran Academy in Fond du Lac joined as the conference's eighth member after the East Central Flyway was closed in 2007. Omro's entry into the Wisconsin Flyway Conference from the Eastern Valley Conference in 2010 brought membership to its high of nine schools. This mark was to be short-lived, as Horicon left to join the Trailways Conference in 2012. The membership roster was further decreased to seven schools in 2015 when Kettle Moraine Lutheran became members of the reconstituted East Central Conference. In 2021, Campbellsport exited the East Central Conference to become the Wisconsin Flyway Conference's eighth member. This figure increased back to nine in 2025, as St. Lawrence Seminary joined as a full member after having previously been an associate member in multiple sports.

=== Football-only alignment ===
In February 2019, in conjunction with the Wisconsin Football Coaches Association, the WIAA released a sweeping football-only realignment for Wisconsin to commence with the 2020 football season and run on a two-year cycle. The Wisconsin Flyway Conference was set to keep its seven-member all-sport lineup intact for football, with the early addition of Campbellsport as a football-only member for 2020 before attaining full membership in 2021. In the wake of the COVID-19 pandemic, the Wisconsin Flyway Conference postponed their football season until the alternate season in spring 2021. Ripon and Waupun joined as temporary members for the season, as they were the only schools in the East Central Conference that did not field football teams for the fall 2020 season. The Wisconsin Flyway Conference has maintained its eight-member roster for football through the 2026-2027 realignment cycle.

== List of member schools ==
=== Current full members ===
School	Location	Affiliation	Enrollment	Mascot	Colors	Joined
Campbellsport	Campbellsport, WI	Public	426	Cougars		2021
Laconia	Rosendale, WI	Public	291	Spartans		2006
Lomira	Lomira, WI	Public	292	Lions		2006
Mayville	Mayville, WI	Public	336	Cardinals		2006
North Fond du Lac	North Fond du Lac, WI	Public	482	Orioles		2006
Omro	Omro, WI	Public	327	Foxes		2010
St. Lawrence Seminary	Mount Calvary, WI	Private (Catholic, Capuchin)	135 (Boys only)	Hilltoppers		2025
St. Mary's Springs	Fond du Lac, WI	Private (Catholic)	266	Ledgers		2006
Winnebago Lutheran	Fond du Lac, WI	Private (Lutheran, WELS)	337	Vikings		2007

=== Current associate members ===
School	Location	Affiliation	Mascot	Colors	Primary Conference	Conference Sports
Central Wisconsin Christian	Waupun, WI	Private (Reformed)	Crusaders		Trailways	Boys Soccer, Girls Soccer
Hustisford	Hustisford, WI	Public	Falcons		Trailways	Girls Soccer (Note: Co-operative with Dodgeland)
Lourdes Academy	Oshkosh, WI	Private (Catholic)	Knights		Trailways	Boys Soccer, (Note: Co-operative with Valley Christian) Girls Soccer
Wayland Academy	Beaver Dam, WI	Private (Nonsectarian)	Big Red		Trailways	Boys Soccer, Girls Soccer

=== Former full members ===
School	Location	Affiliation	Mascot	Colors	Joined	Left	Conference Joined	Current Conference
Horicon	Horicon, WI	Public	Marshmen		2006	2012	Trailways	
Kettle Moraine Lutheran	Jackson, WI	Private (Lutheran, WELS)	Chargers		2006	2015	East Central	Glacier Trails

=== Former football-only members ===
School	Location	Affiliation	Mascot	Colors	Seasons	Primary Conference
Ripon	Ripon, WI	Public	Tigers		2021-Alt	East Central
Waupun	Waupun, WI	Public	Warriors		2021-Alt	East Central

== Membership map ==
Wisconsin Flyway Conference
Location of Wisconsin Flyway Conference full members:
1 Campbellsport
2 Laconia
3 Lomira
4 Mayville
5 North Fond du Lac
6 Omro
7 St. Lawrence Seminary
8 St. Mary's Springs
9 Winnebago Lutheran

== Sponsored sports ==
	Baseball	Boys Basketball	Girls Basketball	Boys Cross Country	Girls Cross Country	Football	Boys Golf	Boys Soccer	Girls Soccer	Softball	Boys Track & Field	Girls Track & Field	Girls Volleyball	Boys Wrestling	Girls Wrestling
Campbellsport	●	●	●	●	●	●	●	●	●	●	●	●	●	●	●
Laconia	●	●	●	●	●	●	●				●	●	●	●	●
Lomira	●	●	●	●	●	●	●	●	●	●	●	●	●	●	●
Mayville	●	●	●	●	●	●	●	●	● (Note: Co-operative with Oakfield)	●	●	●	●		
North Fond du Lac	●	●	●	●	●	●	●	● (Note: Co-operative with Oakfield and St. Mary's Springs)	●	●	●	●	●	● (Note: Co-operative with St. Mary's Springs)	●
Omro	●	●	●	●	●	●	●	●	●	●	●	●	●	●	●
St. Lawrence Seminary				●			●	●			●			●	
St. Mary's Springs	●	●	●	●	●	●	●		●	●	●	●	●		
Winnebago Lutheran	●	●	●	●	●	●	●	●	●	●	●	●	●	●	●

== List of state champions ==
Football
School	Year	Division
St. Mary's Springs	2009	Division 5
St. Mary's Springs	2011	Division 6
St. Mary's Springs	2012	Division 6
St. Mary's Springs	2014	Division 6
St. Mary's Springs	2015	Division 6
St. Mary's Springs	2017	Division 6
St. Mary's Springs	2018	Division 6
St. Mary's Springs	2019	Division 6
Lomira	2024	Division 6

Girls Volleyball
School	Year	Division
Kettle Moraine Lutheran	2007	Division 2
Kettle Moraine Lutheran	2012	Division 2

=== Winter sports ===
Girls Basketball
School	Year	Division
Kettle Moraine Lutheran	2014	Division 3
Laconia	2023	Division 4
Laconia	2024	Division 4

=== Spring sports ===
Baseball
School	Year	Division
Winnebago Lutheran	2011	Division 3
Laconia	2015	Division 3
Laconia	2016	Division 3
Laconia	2017	Division 3

Boys Golf
School	Year	Division
St. Mary's Springs	2015	Division 3
St. Mary's Springs	2016	Division 3
St. Mary's Springs	2017	Division 3
St. Mary's Springs	2018	Division 3

Girls Soccer
School	Year	Division
Kettle Moraine Lutheran	2009	Division 3
Kettle Moraine Lutheran	2011	Division 3

Softball
School	Year	Division
Lomira	2026	Division 3

Boys Track & Field
School	Year	Division
St. Mary's Springs	2013	Division 3

== List of conference champions ==
=== Boys Basketball ===
School	Quantity	Years
Laconia	6	2007, 2008, 2009, 2013, 2014, 2017
Winnebago Lutheran	5	2010, 2016, 2018, 2019, 2020
Omro	4	2011, 2012, 2016, 2024
St. Mary's Springs	4	2021, 2022, 2023, 2025
Kettle Moraine Lutheran	2	2009, 2015
Campbellsport	1	2022
Lomira	1	2026
Horicon	0	
Mayville	0	
North Fond du Lac	0	
St. Lawrence Seminary	0	

=== Girls Basketball ===
School	Quantity	Years
Laconia	10	2016, 2017, 2018, 2019, 2020, 2022, 2023, 2024, 2025, 2026
Kettle Moraine Lutheran	5	2008, 2012, 2013, 2014, 2015
Lomira	4	2009, 2010, 2011, 2012
Winnebago Lutheran	3	2009, 2021, 2023
North Fond du Lac	1	2007
Campbellsport	0	
Horicon	0	
Mayville	0	
Omro	0	
St. Mary's Springs	0	

=== Football ===
School	Quantity	Years
St. Mary's Springs	13	2008, 2009, 2011, 2012, 2013, 2014, 2016, 2017, 2018, 2019, 2021, 2023, 2024
Mayville	5	2007, 2021, 2022, 2024, 2026
Laconia	2	2021-Alt, 2021
Omro	3	2010, 2015, 2021-Alt
Campbellsport	1	2021
Horicon	1	2006
Kettle Moraine Lutheran	1	2007
Lomira	1	2026
North Fond du Lac	0	
Ripon	0	
Waupun	0	
Winnebago Lutheran	0	
