= Badger Lutheran Conference =

Wisconsin high school athletic conference (1961–1964)

The Badger Lutheran Conference is a former high school athletic conference in Wisconsin. Consisting entirely of Lutheran high schools, it existed from 1961 to 1964.

== History ==
Location of Badger Lutheran Conference Members

The Badger Lutheran Conference was created in 1961 by four Lutheran high schools in the eastern half of Wisconsin: Fox Valley Lutheran in Appleton, Lakeside Lutheran in Lake Mills, Manitowoc Lutheran and Winnebago Lutheran in Fond du Lac. All four original members were affiliated with the Wisconsin Evangelical Lutheran Synod, and the conference only sponsored basketball during its history. This was one of the factors leading to the short life span of the Badger Lutheran Conference, the other being long travel distances to other schools. In 1964, Lakeside Lutheran left the conference to join the Madison Suburban Conference, which cut their travel distances significantly. The other three schools disbanded the conference shortly afterwards, with Winnebago Lutheran joining the Fox Valley Tri-County League, Manitowoc Lutheran becoming members of the Kettle Moraine Conference and Fox Valley Lutheran competing as independents before joining the Midwest Prep Conference in 1965.

== Conference membership history ==
School	Location	Affiliation	Mascot	Colors	Joined	Left	Conference Joined	Current Conference
Fox Valley Lutheran	Appleton, WI	Private (Lutheran, WELS)	Foxes		1961	1964	Independent	Bay (2025)
Lakeside Lutheran	Lake Mills, WI	Private (Lutheran, WELS)	Warriors		1961	1964	Madison Suburban	Capitol
Manitowoc Lutheran	Manitowoc, WI	Private (Lutheran, WELS)	Lancers		1961	1964	Kettle Moraine	Big East
Winnebago Lutheran	Fond du Lac, WI	Private (Lutheran, WELS)	Vikings		1961	1964	Fox Valley Tri-County	Wisconsin Flyway

== List of conference champions ==
School	Quantity	Years
Fox Valley Lutheran	3	1962, 1963, 1964
Lakeside Lutheran	0	
Manitowoc Lutheran	0	
Winnebago Lutheran	0	
