= Eastern Suburban Conference =

Wisconsin high school athletic conference (1969-2001)

The Eastern Suburban Conference is a former high school athletic conference in Wisconsin, originally formed in 1969 and disbanding in 2001. With the exception of the conference's two private schools, all members belonged to the Wisconsin Interscholastic Athletic Association and were located in south central Wisconsin.

== History ==
=== 1969–1977 ===
Location of Original Eastern Suburban Conference Members

The Eastern Suburban Conference was formed in 1969 after the dissolution of the eighteen-member Madison Suburban Conference. Six of its original members were part of that conference's Eastern Section (Cambridge, Deerfield, Johnson Creek, Juneau-Reeseville, Lakeside Lutheran in Lake Mills, and Marshall) with Palmyra and Queen of Apostles in Madison rounding out the original membership roster. Juneau-Reeseville (later renamed Dodgeland) left the conference after only one season to become a charter member of the newly created Flyway Conference. They were replaced by Hustisford and Williams Bay, formerly of the Fox Valley Tri-County League and Indian Trails Conference, respectively.

=== 1977–1987 ===
Waterloo joined the Eastern Suburban Conference from the Capitol Conference in 1977, and two years later, Queen of Apostles High School left the conference after it was closed by the Catholic order (Pallotine Fathers and Brothers of Milwaukee) that ran the school. They were replaced in 1980 by Dodgeland, making their return to the Eastern Suburban after ten years of competition as members of the Flyway Conference. Lake Mills became members of the conference after exiting the Capitol Conference in 1983, giving Lakeside Lutheran a crosstown rival for conference play. For a three-year period, the Eastern Suburban Conference was partitioned into Northern and Southern divisions:

Northern Division	Southern Division
Dodgeland	Cambridge
Hustisford	Deerfield
Lakeside Lutheran	Johnson Creek
Marshall	Lake Mills
Waterloo	Palmyra-Eagle
	Williams Bay

=== 1987–2001 ===
Location of Final Eastern Suburban Conference Members

Lake Mills' stint in the Eastern Suburban Conference was short-lived, as they returned to the Capitol Conference in 1987. Palmyra-Eagle would leave the Eastern Suburban to join the Rock Valley Conference in 1990, and in 1991, the Eastern Suburban and Dual County Conferences traded members for their football-only alignments. Gone were the three smallest schools in the conference (Deerfield, Hustisford and Johnson Creek), and in its place entered the three largest schools from the Dual County (Montello, Pardeeville and Westfield). Lakeside Lutheran would make their exit from the Eastern Suburban Conference in 1995 for membership in the Capitol Conference. The Eastern Suburban Conference would end its run in 2001 with three schools (Cambridge, Marshall and Waterloo) joining the Capitol Conference and the remaining five (Deerfield, Dodgeland, Hustisford, Johnson Creek and Williams Bay) joining with the Dual County Conference to create the new Trailways Conference.

== Conference membership history ==
=== Final members ===
School	Location	Affiliation	Mascot	Colors	Joined	Left	Conference Joined	Current Conference
Cambridge	Cambridge, WI	Public	Bluejays		1969	2001	Capitol	
Deerfield	Deerfield, WI	Public	Demons		1969	2001	Trailways	
Dodgeland	Juneau, WI	Public	Trojans		1969, 1980	1970, 2001	Trailways	
Hustisford	Hustisford, WI	Public	Falcons		1970	2001	Trailways	
Johnson Creek	Johnson Creek, WI	Public	Bluejays		1969	2001	Trailways	
Marshall	Marshall, WI	Public	Cardinals		1969	2001	Capitol	
Waterloo	Waterloo, WI	Public	Pirates		1977	2001	Capitol	
Williams Bay	Williams Bay, WI	Public	Bulldogs		1970	2001	Trailways	

=== Previous Members ===
School	Location	Affiliation	Mascot	Colors	Joined	Left	Conference Joined	Current Conference
Lake Mills	Lake Mills, WI	Public	L-Cats		1983	1987	Capitol	
Lakeside Lutheran	Lake Mills, WI	Private (Lutheran, WELS)	Warriors		1969	1995	Capitol	
Palmyra-Eagle	Palmyra, WI	Public	Panthers		1969	1990	Rock Valley	Trailways
Queen of Apostles	Madison, WI	Private (Catholic, Pallotine)	Raiders		1969	1979	Closed	

=== Football-only members ===
School	Location	Affiliation	Mascot	Colors	Seasons	Primary Conference
Montello	Montello, WI	Public	Hilltoppers		1991-2000	Dual County
Pardeeville	Pardeeville, WI	Public	Bulldogs		1991-2000	Dual County
Westfield	Westfield, WI	Public	Pioneers		1991-2000	Dual County

== Membership timeline ==
=== Full members ===
Northern Division Southern Division Football-only members Non-football members

== List of state champions ==
=== Fall sports ===
Boys Cross Country
School	Year	Division
Lakeside Lutheran	1992	WISAA Division 2

Girls Cross Country
School	Year	Division
Cambridge	1984	Class C

Football
School	Year	Division
Cambridge	1979	Division 5

Girls Volleyball
School	Year	Division
Cambridge	1974	Class C
Cambridge	1975	Class C
Cambridge	1980	Class C
Hustisford	2000	Division 4

=== Winter sports ===
Girls Basketball
School	Year	Division
Marshall	1976	Class C
Marshall	1977	Class C
Johnson Creek	1984	Class C
Lakeside Lutheran	1987	WISAA Class B

Gymnastics
School	Year	Division
Marshall	1973	Single Division

=== Spring sports ===
Baseball
School	Year	Division
Hustisford	1978	Class C
Waterloo	1999	Division 3

Softball
School	Year	Division
Marshall	1987	Class C
Marshall	1989	Class C
Marshall	1994	Division 3

Boys Track & Field
School	Year	Division
Deerfield	1980	Class C
Deerfield	1981	Class C
Cambridge	1987	Class C
Deerfield	1996	Division 3

Girls Track & Field
School	Year	Division
Palmyra-Eagle	1978	Class C
Waterloo	1987	Class C

== List of conference champions ==
=== Boys Basketball ===
School	Quantity	Years
Lakeside Lutheran	9	1975, 1978, 1979, 1983, 1984, 1985, 1991, 1993, 1994
Marshall	6	1972, 1973, 1976, 1992, 1999, 2000
Waterloo	6	1980, 1981, 1982, 1986, 1987, 1998
Palmyra-Eagle	5	1974, 1985, 1986, 1989, 1990
Cambridge	4	1971, 1996, 1997, 2001
Williams Bay	4	1977, 1987, 1988, 1995
Deerfield	1	1984
Dodgeland	1	1970
Hustisford	1	1997
Johnson Creek	0	
Lake Mills	0	
Queen of Apostles	0	

=== Girls Basketball ===
School	Quantity	Years
Cambridge	6	1990, 1992, 1993, 1994, 1995, 1996
Hustisford	5	1991, 1997, 1998, 1999, 2001
Marshall	5	1976, 1977, 1978, 1979, 1984
Johnson Creek	4	1980, 1982, 1983, 1984
Dodgeland	3	1981, 1988, 1989
Palmyra-Eagle	2	1986, 1987
Waterloo	2	2000, 2001
Lakeside Lutheran	1	1985
Deerfield	0	
Lake Mills	0	
Queen of Apostles	0	
Williams Bay	0	

=== Football ===
School	Quantity	Years
Cambridge	15	1971, 1972, 1974, 1975, 1976, 1977, 1979, 1980, 1982, 1986, 1988, 1989, 1990, 1996, 1999
Waterloo	9	1983, 1985, 1990, 1993, 1994, 1995, 1997, 1998, 1999
Marshall	7	1972, 1984, 1987, 1991, 1992, 1993, 2000
Lakeside Lutheran	4	1970, 1975, 1990, 1994
Deerfield	2	1969, 1985
Queen of Apostles	2	1973, 1976
Dodgeland	1	1981
Johnson Creek	1	1978
Palmyra-Eagle	1	1987
Pardeeville	1	1999
Hustisford	0	
Lake Mills	0	
Montello	0	
Westfield	0	
Williams Bay	0	
