= Southeast 8-Player Football Conference =

Wisconsin high school football conference

The Southeast 8-Player Football Conference is a high school football conference with members located in southeastern Wisconsin. It was formed in 2024 and is affiliated with the Wisconsin Interscholastic Athletic Association.

== History ==
The Southeast 8-Player Football Conference was created in 2022, when the WIAA and Wisconsin Football Coaches Association unveiled their realignment plan for Wisconsin's high school football conferences in the 2024-2025 competition cycle. Six of the conference's original nine members (Green Lake/Princeton, Montello, Oakfield, Valley Christian in Oshkosh, Wayland Academy in Beaver Dam and Williams Bay) belonged to the Trailways Conference as full members, along with one member from the Big East Conference (Elkhart Lake-Glenbeulah), one from the Midwest Classic Conference (St. John's Northwestern) and one independent (Lincoln Academy in Beloit). For the 2026-2027 realignment cycle, the Southeast-8 lost two members to the Across the Bay Conference (Elkhart Lake-Glenbeulah and Valley Christian) and one who dropped football entirely (Lincoln Academy). The conference will be welcoming two former eleven-player programs to eight-player football as their replacements: the Abundant Life Christian School/St. Ambrose Academy cooperative (formerly of the Ridge & Valley Conference) and Palmyra-Eagle from the Trailways Conference.

== List of conference members ==
=== Current members ===
School	Location	Affiliation	Enrollment	Mascot	Colors	Joined	Primary Conference
Abundant Life Christian/ St. Ambrose	Madison, WI	Private (Christian, Catholic)	318	Challengers		2026	Trailways
Green Lake/ Princeton	Green Lake, WI & Princeton, WI	Public	174	Tigersharks		2024	Trailways
Montello	Montello, WI	Public	206	Hilltoppers		2024	Trailways
Oakfield	Oakfield, WI	Public	164	Oaks		2024	Trailways
Palmyra-Eagle	Palmyra, WI	Public	144	Panthers		2026	Trailways
St. John's Northwestern	Delafield, WI	Private (Nonsectarian), Military	187	Lancers		2024	Midwest Classic
Wayland Academy	Beaver Dam, WI	Private (Nonsectarian, historically Baptist)	195	Big Red		2024	Trailways
Williams Bay	Williams Bay, WI	Public	178	Bulldogs		2024	Trailways

=== Former members ===
School	Location	Affiliation	Mascot	Colors	Seasons	Primary Conference
Elkhart Lake-Glenbeulah	Elkhart Lake, WI	Public	Resorters		2024-2025	Big East
The Lincoln Academy	Beloit, WI	Charter	Lions		2024-2025	Independent
Valley Christian	Oshkosh, WI	Private (Christian)	Warriors		2024-2025	Trailways

== List of conference champions ==
School	Quantity	Years
Abundant Life Christian/ St. Ambrose Academy	1	2026
Elkhart Lake-Glenbeulah	1	2024
Oakfield	1	2025
Montello	0	
Palmyra-Eagle	0	
Princeton/ Green Lake	0	
St. John's Northwestern	0	
The Lincoln Academy	0	
Valley Christian	0	
Wayland Academy	0	
Williams Bay	0	
