= Deerfield High School (Wisconsin) =

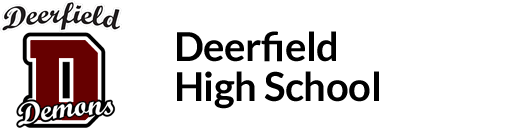

Location
- 300 Simonson Boulevard; Deerfield, Wisconsin; United States; 43°02′49″N 89°04′48″W

Information
- Type: Public
- Motto: Committed to Excellence and Equity in Education
- School district: Deerfield Community School District
- NCES School ID: 550327000371
- Principal: Scott Kramper
- Teaching staff: 16.60 (on FTE basis)
- Grades: 9 to 12
- Enrollment: 223 est. (2026-2027)
- Student to teacher ratio: 12.59
- Colors: Maroon, black and white
- Fight song: Notre Dame Victory March
- Athletics conference: Trailways Conference For everything but soccer, boys volleyball, and XC Badger Small for Boys volleyball XC and soccer Capitol Conference South
- Mascot: Demon
- Nickname: DHS
- Team name: Deerfield Demons
- Rival: Cambridge Marshall Waterloo
- Yearbook: Demeno
- Website: https://www.deerfield.k12.wi.us/schools/high/

Deerfield High School is a public high school located in Deerfield, Wisconsin. The school mascot is the Demon. It is located on 300 Simonson Blvd. The current principal is Shannon McDonough. Deerfield High School is part of the Trailways conference for athletics and academic competitions. For football they are in the eastern suburban conference. For cross country and soccer, Deerfield High School joins with Cambridge in a co-op for these two athletic activities and for boys volleyball they join with McFarland, Monona Grove, and Oregon.

== Athletic conference affiliation history ==
- Madison Suburban Conference (1926-1969)
- Eastern Suburban Conference (1969-2001)
- Eastern Suburban Conference (2024-2025) Football only
- Trailways Conference (2001–present)
