= Madison Country Day School =

Location
- 5606 River Road; Waunakee, Wisconsin 53597; United States; 43°9′46.98″N 89°23′22.56″W

Information
- School type: Private, Country Day
- Motto: Every child possesses an extraordinary capacity to learn.
- Established: 1997
- Head of school: Mark A. Brooks
- Grades: PreK - 12
- Enrollment: 493 (2025)
- Fight song: Onward MCDS
- Athletics: Yes
- Mascot: Prairie Hawk
- Website: www.madisoncountryday.org

Madison Country Day School is a nonsectarian, independent day school in Dane County, Wisconsin, for grades Pre-K through grade 12. The school has an enrollment of about 500 students. It is accredited by the Independent Schools Association of the Central States (ISACS), and is a member of the National Association of Independent Schools (NAIS). It is an International Baccalaureate (IB) World School that offers the IB Diploma Program (DP) to high school students in grades 11 and 12. As well as the IB Middle Years Program (MYP) to students in grades 5 to10 and IB Primary Years Program (PYP) to students in Pre-k to grade 4. Madison Country Day School is informally known as "MCDS".

== History ==
The school began classes on September 2, 1997. The school was originally planned for a 46-acre (19 ha) site in the Town of Westport donated by PDQ convenience store founder Sam Jacobsen, with buildings to be designed by Robert A. M. Stern Architects. However, when a conditional use permit was denied by the Dane County Zoning and Natural Resources Committee, the school rented quarters in a former schoolhouse in the town of Martinsville. Twenty-two students enrolled in 1997 for pre-kindergarten, kindergarten, and Grades 1–3. Additional grades were added one at a time. The school later moved to 76 acres (310,000 m^{2}) of land near Waunakee. A $3 million renovation project in 2001 converted sleeping rooms of the former Yahara Center into classrooms. An upper school was formed when the ninth grade was added in 2003. The first senior class graduated in the spring of 2007. In 2015, a fundraiser began called Spreading Our Wings. The goal was to raise 6.8 million dollars in order to expand the school. The fundraiser was named after the school mascot, the fictional Prairie Hawk.

== Curriculum ==
MCDS is an International Baccalaureate World School and accredited by the Independent Schools Association of the Central States (ISACS) and is a member of the National Association of Independent Schools (NAIS).

MCDS enrolls students from pre-kindergarten through 12th grade. The school has three divisions: The lower school covers pre-kindergarten through fourth grade. The middle school contains fifth through eighth, and the high school ninth through twelfth grade.

== Athletics ==
MCDS's athletic teams are known as the Prairie Hawks, and they have been members of the Trailways Conference since 2012.
