= Deerfield Community School District =

School district in Wisconsin, United States

Address
- 300 Simonson Boulevard Deerfield, Dane County, Wisconsin, 53531; United States
- Coordinates: 43.046°N 89.080°W

District information
- Type: Public
- Grades: Pre-K/K–12
- School board: Seven members
- Schools: Elementary (1); Middle (1); High (1)
- NCES District ID: 5503270

Students and staff
- Students: 746 (2023-2024)
- Staff: 111.70 (FTE, 2023-2024)
- Student–teacher ratio: 11.29

Other information
- Website: www.deerfield.k12.wi.us

The Deerfield Community School District is a school district based in the village of Deerfield, Wisconsin. It serves the village of Deerfield and the surrounding rural area. Deerfield Community has a seven-member Board of Education that governs the district and selects the superintendent.

The district administers one elementary school, one middle school, and one high school, for a total of three schools.

== Schools ==
School	Year built	Description
Deerfield High School	1966-2026	Serves grades 9-12.
Deerfield Middle School	1966-2026	Serves grades 6-8. Housed in same building as the high school.
Deerfield Elementary School	2004	Serves grades 4K-5.

== History ==
In 2004, Deerfield Community built a new elementary school to replace its previous building.
