= Hustisford Junior/Senior High School =

Hustisford Jr/Sr High School

Location
- 845 S Lake Street; Hustisford, Dodge, Wisconsin 53034; United States
- Coordinates: 43°20′16.2″N 88°36′17.8″W

Information
- Other name: Hustiford High School
- School type: Public
- School district: School District of Hustisford
- Superintendent: Heather Cramer
- NCES School ID: 550678000738
- Dean: Clint Bushey
- Staff: 17.40 (FTE)
- Teaching staff: 17.40 (on an FTE basis)
- Grades: 6-12
- Student to teacher ratio: 9.08
- Website: www.hustisford.k12.wi.us/high/

Hustisford High School is a public high school located in Hustisford, Wisconsin, United States. It serves students in 6th through 12th grade. It is part of the Hustisford School District and is housed in the same building as the John Hustis Elementary school (grades PK–5).

In 2023–24, enrollment in the Hustisford Junior/Senior High School was 156.

== Extracurricular activities ==
Student activities include Academic Bowl, FFA, Forensics, Math Bowl, Marching Band, Mock Trial, National Honor Society, Pep Band, Spanish Club, Student Council, and Yearbook.

=== Athletics ===
The sports offered in fall include football, volleyball, and cheerleading. In winter there are both boys' and girls' basketball, wrestling, and dance. In spring there are baseball, softball, and soccer.

==== Athletic conference affiliation history ====
- Little Five Conference (1929-1935)
- Fox Valley Tri-County League (1955-1970)
- Eastern Suburban Conference (1970-2001)
- Trailways Conference (2001–present)

== Recognition ==
The school was named one of the "Best High Schools" in America by U.S. News & World Report in 2010.
