= Abundant Life Christian School =

K–12 school in Madison, Dane County, Wisconsin, United States

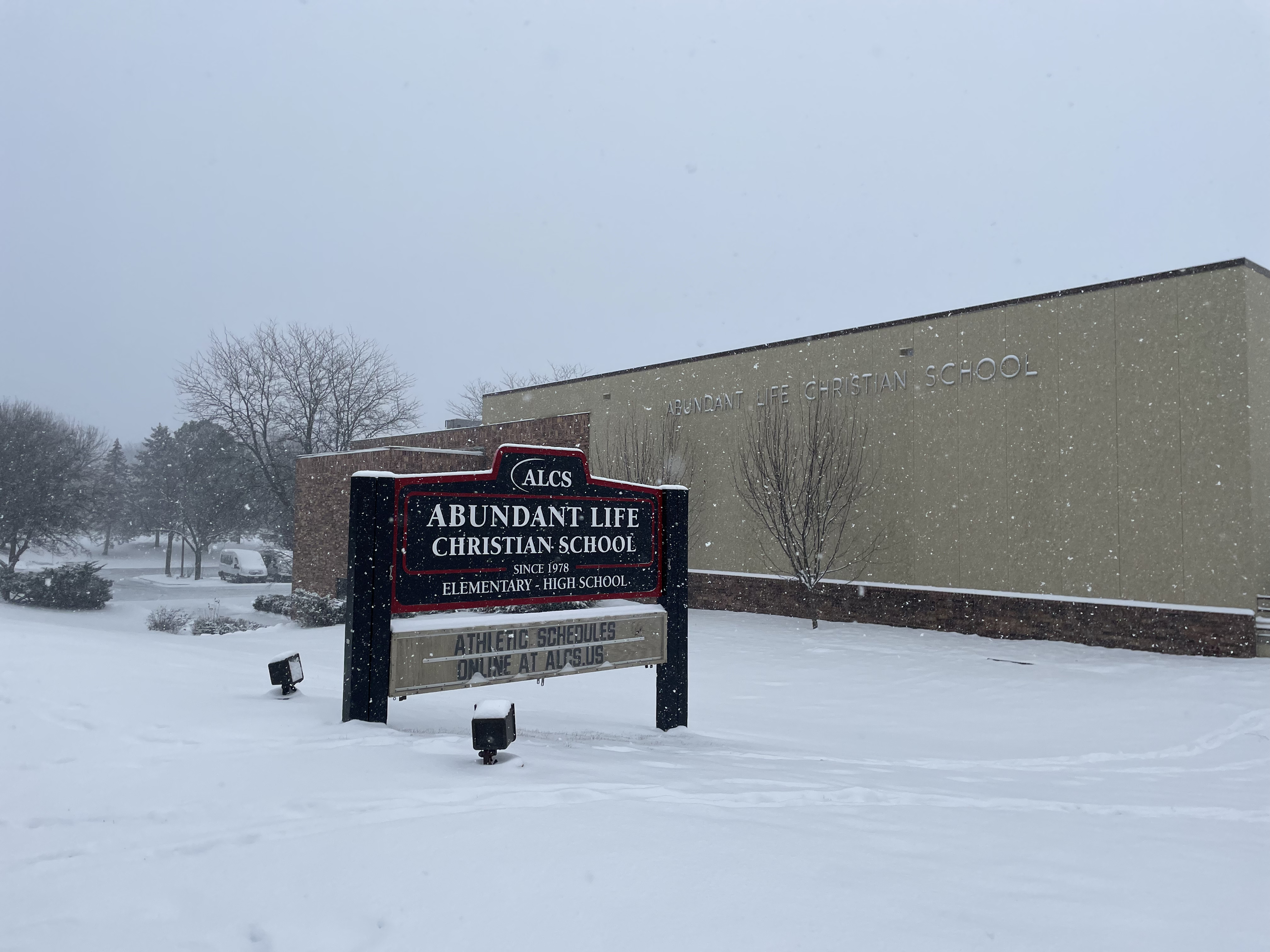
- Abundant Life Christian School in 2024

Location
- 4901 E Buckeye Rd; Madison, Wisconsin 53716; United States; 43.0727046°N 89.2992193°W

Information
- Type: Private, christian, college preparatory
- Religious affiliation: Christianity
- Established: 1978
- Founder: Lake City Church
- Principal: Jennifer Rae
- Grades: K3 – 12
- Gender: Co-Educational
- Enrollment: 410
- Student to teacher ratio: 26:2
- Campus size: 28 acres
- Campus type: Large City
- Colors: Red, white, and black
- Slogan: Building Character & Achieving Athletic Success
- Athletics: basketball, cross country, football, golf, soccer, track & field, volleyball
- Athletics conference: Wisconsin Interscholastic Athletic Association (WIAA)
- Nickname: Challengers
- Accreditation: ACSI
- Tuition: $6,371–$10,860 (2025-26)
- Website: Abundant Life Christian School

Abundant Life Christian School (ALCS) is a private Christian school located in Madison, Wisconsin, United States. It is one of the largest Evangelical private schools in the Madison area. ALCS was founded in 1978 by Lake City Church, formerly Madison Gospel Tabernacle, under the leadership of Pastor Warren Heckman. ALCS was established to be a community Christian school and welcomes families from a variety of churches.

ALCS is a K3–12 school which shares its 28-acre (110,000 m^{2}) campus with City Church, a union of Lake City Church and Mad City Church. While the two ministries are closely related, the students and staff represent over 50 churches, and many neighborhoods in Madison and its surrounding communities.

Abundant Life Christian School and High Point Christian School consolidated in 2011 to form Madison Christian Schools, a single school covering two campuses.

== Accreditation ==
ALCS maintains accreditation as a K4-12 school through the Association of Christian Schools International (ACSI).

Accreditation History for Abundant Life Christian School includes:

- Association of Christian Schools International (ACSI)
- North Central Association Commission on Accreditation & School Improvement (NCACASI)
- Commission on International and Transregional Accreditation (CITA)
- International Christian Accrediting Association (ICAA)

ALCS was one of the first schools accredited by the ICAA under the leadership of former principal David Wagner.

== History ==
=== 2024 shooting ===
On December 16, 2024, a mass shooting occurred at the school. Three people — one teacher and two students, including the perpetrator — were killed in the attack. Six others were injured. The perpetrator, 15-year-old Natalie “Samantha” Rupnow, who attended the school, died from a self-inflicted gunshot wound at the scene.

== Athletics ==
ALCS's athletic nickname is the Challengers, and they have been members of the Trailways Conference since its inception in 2001.

=== Athletic conference affiliation history ===
- SWISS Conference (1990-1998)
- Trailways Conference (2001–present)
