= Central Wisconsin Christian High School =

Private school in Wisconsin, United States

Coordinates: 43°37′41.4″N 88°45′11.2″W

Central Wisconsin Christian High School is a private Christian school in Waupun, Wisconsin. The school combines a high school, middle school, and elementary school in a single building.

== Athletics ==
Central Wisconsin Christian's athletic program is nicknamed the Crusaders, and they have been affiliated with the Trailways Conference since 2004.

=== Athletic conference affiliation history ===
- Classic Conference (1973-1983)
- Midwest Classic Conference (1983-1999)
- Flyway Conference (1999-2001)
- East Central Flyway Conference (2001-2004)
- Trailways Conference (2004-present)
