= St. Lawrence Seminary High School =

Private all male school in Mt. Calvary, Wisconsin, United States

- St. Lawrence or SLS
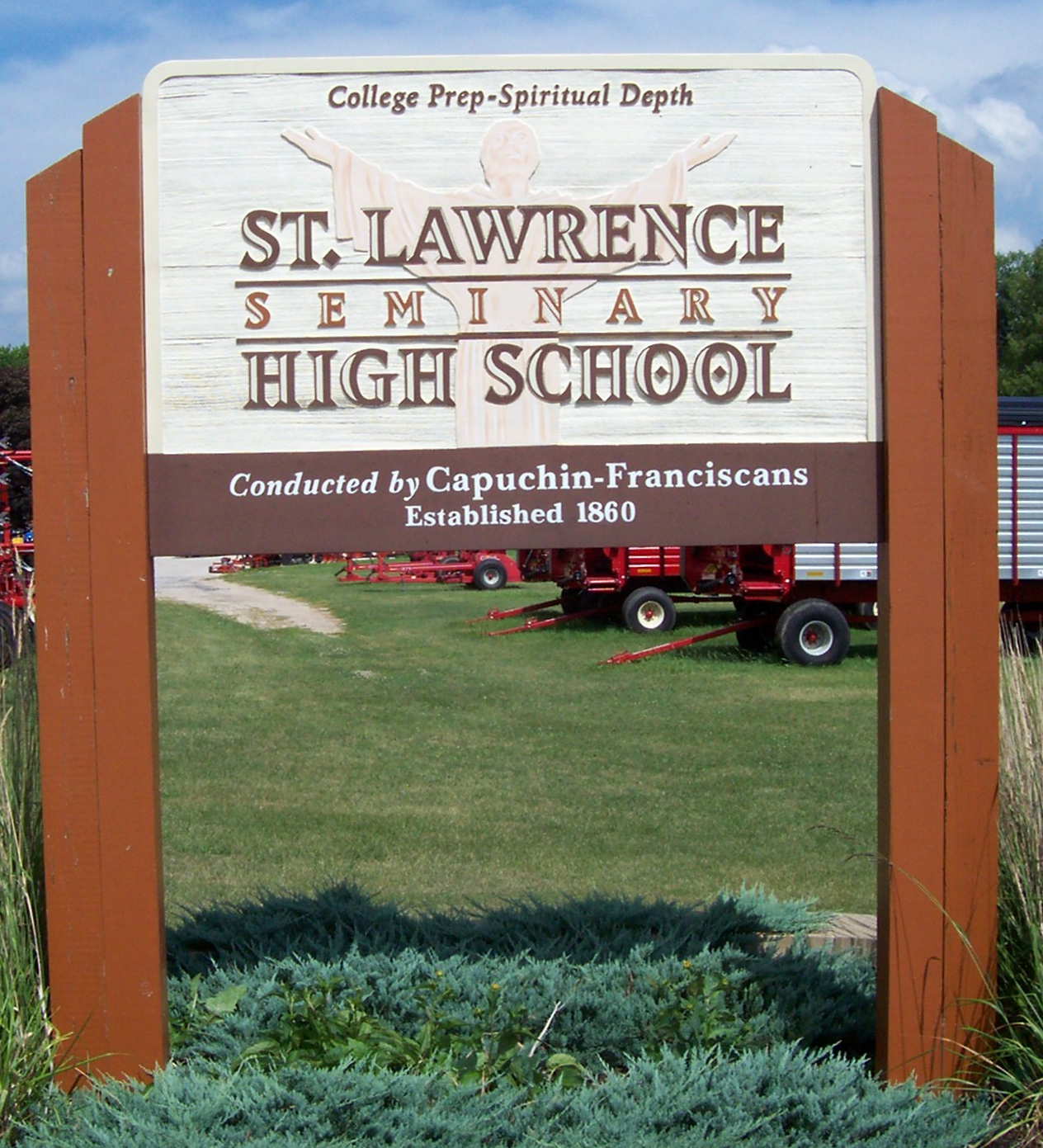

Location
- 301 Church Street; Mt. Calvary, (Fond du Lac County), Wisconsin 53057; United States; 43°49′22″N 88°15′2″W

Information
- Type: Private, all male
- Motto: Celsitudo ex Humilitate (To the heights, from the depths)
- Religious affiliation: Roman Catholic
- Patron saint: St. Lawrence of Brindisi
- Established: 1860
- Founder: Fathers Gregory Haas and Bonaventure Frey
- Rector: Fr. William Hugo, OFMCap
- Faculty: 25 full time
- Grades: 9–12
- Campus: 13 buildings
- Campus size: 80 acres (32 hectares)
- Colors: Brown and gold
- Song: Alma Mater
- Fight song: Get Out and Fight
- Mascot: Hilltopper
- Team name: Hilltoppers
- Accreditation: North Central Association of Colleges and Schools
- Newspaper: Hilltopics
- Yearbook: Laurentian
- Director of School: David Bartel
- Dean of Students: Quan Nguyen
- Athletic Director: Chad Dowland
- Director of Operations: Timothy Schroeder
- Director of Institutional Advancement: Kevin P. Buelow
- Website: http://www.stlawrence.edu

St. Lawrence Seminary High School is a preparatory high school operated by the Province of St. Joseph of the Capuchin Order at Mount Calvary, Wisconsin. The school is in the Archdiocese of Milwaukee. It is an all-male boarding school, with approximately 225 students enrolled in grades 9 through 12. The school's mission is to prepare its male students for vocations (ordained, vowed religious, married, or single life) in the Catholic Church.

The high school was founded in 1860 as the Convent Latin School by two Capuchin friars, Gregory Haas (1826–1895) and Bonaventure Frey (1831–1912). Over the years it has been called the Convent Latin School, the Little Seminary of St. Lawrence of Brindisi, St. Lawrence College, St. Lawrence Seminary, and St. Lawrence Seminary High School. St. Francis Brothers' School merged with St. Lawrence Seminary.

== History ==
=== Founding ===
On February 2, 1849, the pioneer priest Father Caspar Rehrl purchased the hilltop land at Mount Calvary from John Blonigen. A log church of Saint Nicholas was built and the first mass was on May 17, 1849, with the dedication on June 25, 1853. Four diocesan priests served as non-resident pastors.

On October 15, 1856 two Swiss diocesan priests, Gregory Haas and John Anthony (Bonaventure) Frey, arrived by horseback on the hill called Mount Calvary in east central Wisconsin. The little log church of Saint Nicholas was the only building on the hill. They decided to build their own little cloister.

The two priests had left their native Switzerland in July of that year. They arrived in Milwaukee, where Bishop John Martin Henni, a fellow countryman, welcomed them to work among the immigrants in the diocese. But the two priests had not come to work with immigrants; they had come to establish the Capuchin Order in the United States, even though they themselves were not yet Capuchins. The two priests bought the property on Mount Calvary. The 29-year-old Haas returned to Europe to beg funds and to bring back a Capuchin to serve as novice master for him and Frey and any other candidates who joined them. The 25-year-old Frey began building the friary for the first Capuchin foundation in the United States.

When Haas returned from Switzerland with two Capuchin friars and three candidates, he found the friary burdened by debts, but not ready for occupancy by the seven men who would begin the Capuchin foundation. For the first of several times, the School Sisters of Notre Dame, who had a small convent and school on the neighboring hill, came to the rescue. They gave the Capuchins the use of their convent. On December 2, 1857, Father Anthony Maria Gachet, a Capuchin who returned with Haas from Switzerland, invested him and Frey and the three other candidates with the Capuchin habit.

Even during their novitiate Father Francis and Father Bonaventure (as they were now known) had to make a begging trip to Canada, so great was the burden of debt on the new foundation. Their trip was successful, and the debts were paid. They made their first profession of vows on February 16, 1859. Father Anthony Maria, the novice master, lost interest in the undertaking and began to work among the Menominee people in Keshena, Wisconsin.

=== Convent Latin School ===
In 1860 Father Francis and Father Bonaventure opened the Convent Latin School to educate boys so they could join the Capuchin Order. Four boys enrolled. The tuition was $10.00 a year. This marked the beginning of Saint Lawrence Seminary.

The first year of the new college was difficult. The founders’ dreams were modified by their recognition of the need for priests in the Midwest. The college served to educate young men, some of whom the founders hoped would be drawn to join the new Capuchin foundation. In the fall of 1862 15 students enrolled, and 20 began the following year. In 1864 a college wing was added to the friary. (In the mid-19th century any formal educational institution beyond elementary was called a college.) The Convent Latin School merged with the college, making total enrollment 49 students. Friars who taught in the college also served nearby parishes. Their parish ministry financially supported the college. They also went on preaching and begging tours in the Midwest.

In 1867 the friary was enlarged again to make more room for the college students. It was now a quadrangle with a courtyard in the center. The following year saw 28 Capuchin friars and 42 students at the newly completed college.

=== Little Seminary of Saint Lawrence of Brindisi ===
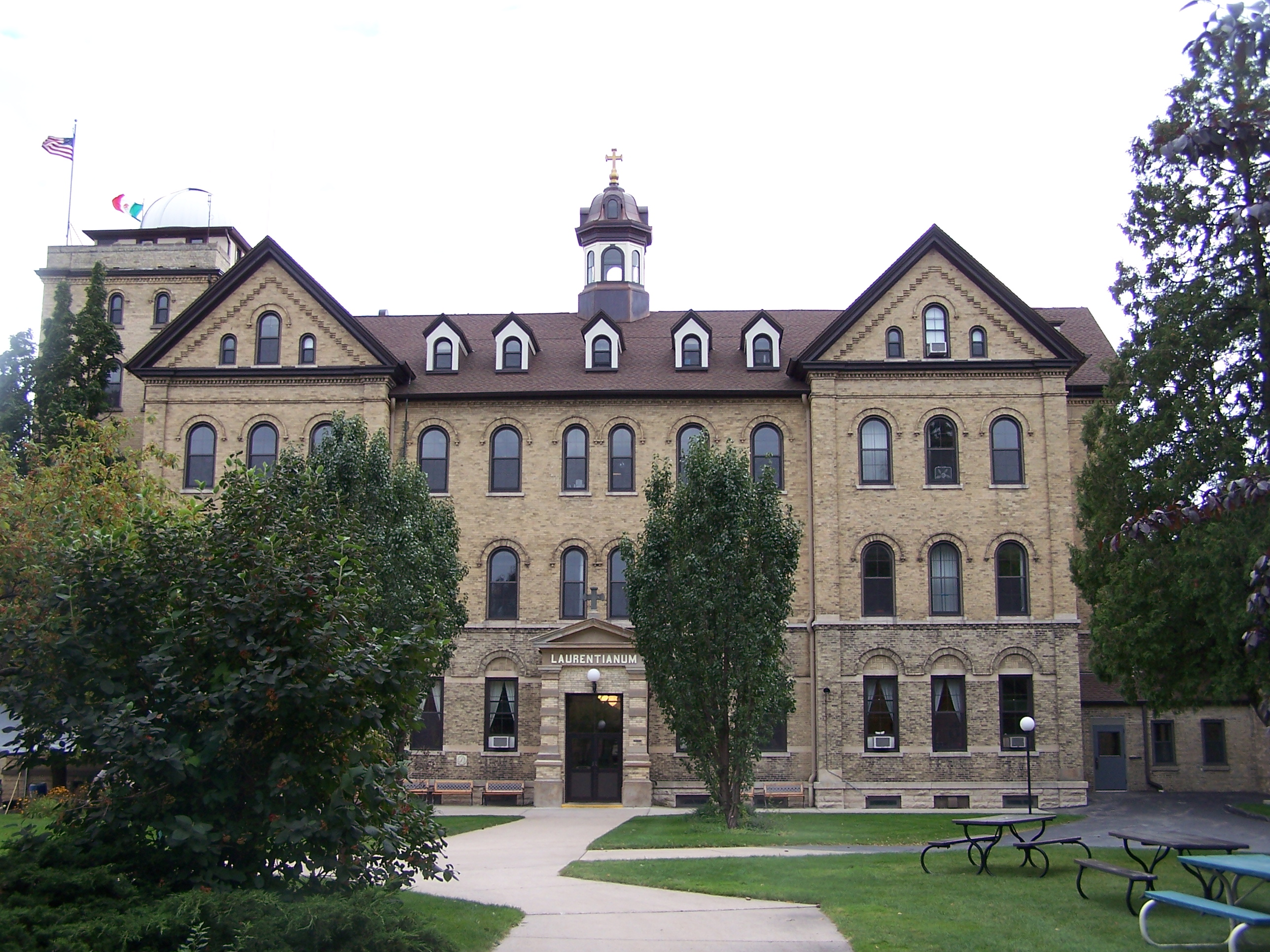
Laurentianum

Disaster struck the friary and college on Christmas night, 1868 when a fire started in the sacristy after everyone was asleep. The entire building, with the exception of part of the parish church, burned to the ground. For a second time, the School Sisters of Notre Dame rescued the friars by allowing them the use of their convent. The sisters moved into a recently vacated farmhouse next to their property. All but six students at the college were sent home. The six students who remained decided they wanted to join the Capuchins. Rebuilding began and, remarkably, the friary and college were ready for occupancy in August 1869. The college was known as the Little Seminary of Saint Lawrence of Brindisi.

The college students needed separate quarters. In 1872 Saint Joseph Hall was erected for their use. The number students continued to increase, and the Laurentianum (the present Main Building) was built in 1881. All student activity was now separate from the friary, with the exception of the dining room. In 1886, at the urging of bishops in the Midwest, a commercial course was introduced into the college curriculum so that Catholic young men going into the business world would have a strong foundation in their Catholic faith.

The Minister General of the Capuchin Order visited the college in 1891 and encouraged the friars to spare no efforts in making Saint Lawrence College a first-class educational institution. A student chapel was added to the Laurentianum in 1893. Saint Thomas Hall was built in 1898 to serve as an auditorium and gymnasium. The grounds were beautified continually, and the course of studies was refined and broadened. The curriculum was now a six-year course, including philosophy. The college was accredited by the Association of Catholic Colleges and Universities.

=== Saint Lawrence College ===
In 1903 the Capuchin Province decided that Saint Lawrence College would serve the exclusive purpose of preparing candidates for the Capuchin Order. The commercial course and the philosophy curriculum were discontinued. The decision decreased the enrollment from 130 students in the 1902–03 academic year to 75 the following year. From 1905 through 1907 the rector of Saint Lawrence College was Father Joseph Wald who was originally from Green Bay, Wisconsin. Father Wald also taught Latin, Geology and Zoology.

In 1906 the Province elected Father Antonine Wilmer as Provincial Minister. He had been the rector of Saint Lawrence College prior to the decision that it serve exclusively Capuchin candidates. Immediately after his election as Provincial Minister, he held a conference with the faculty at Saint Lawrence. He outlined his idea for the college, which was to prepare the students, by a thorough high school and college course, either to enter any lay profession or to continue successfully their preparation for ministry.

Saint Francis Hall was built in 1917 as a residence for those students who intended to be Capuchins. These students took their classes with the rest of the student body, but wore the Third Order habit and lived in Saint Francis Hall. They also followed a schedule of prayer that was different from the other students.

In 1923 the General Minister of the Order visited the college and said Capuchin candidates should not be educated with diocesan seminarians and others in the same institution. He wanted the college closed to all but Capuchin candidates. The friars at the college and many others in the Province were chagrined at the decision of the General. When the General met with the Provincial Superiors, he said that the dual purpose could not continue, but he left it to the Provincial Superiors to resolve the matter. They resolved the matter by abolishing the separate course for the Capuchin candidates. The college would continue and Saint Francis Hall became available to the whole college.

=== Saint Lawrence Seminary ===
Development of higher education in the United States during the 1920s influenced Saint Lawrence College. The professors earned graduate degrees. The college was affiliated with the University of Wisconsin (now University of Wisconsin–Madison), which accredited the school in 1930.

In 1933 Capuchin Father Alexis Gore was appointed rector. He realigned the curriculum and introduced the method of teaching required by the Regents of University of the State of New York. The transition was completed smoothly in one year. Father Gerald Walker was appointed rector in 1943. The previous year's enrollment had been 130 students. Father Gerald dreamed of a greater Laurentianum. Through massive amounts of correspondence with prospective students and benefactors, he led the school to great growth. A new college catalog was widely distributed, with the result that the 1943–44 school year began with an enrollment of 173 students.

By 1949 the school had reached its capacity of about 200 students. Many applicants were put on the waiting list. In 1951 ground breaking took place for the erection of Saint Mary's Hall, a multipurpose building that included a dormitory, a dining room, study halls, and recreation rooms. The increased space was filled immediately. Enrollment jumped to 273 students. In 1953 the name of the school was officially changed from Saint Lawrence College to Saint Lawrence Seminary.

=== St. Francis Brothers’ School and North Central Accreditation ===
That same year property two miles distant from the seminary was purchased to provide a campus for Saint Francis Brothers’ School, which opened with 11 students in 1954.

Father Gratian Zach succeeded Father Gerald Walker as rector in 1955. A new student chapel was built in 1957, present day St. Conrad Hall. Construction was completed on a new dormitory, St. Anthony Hall in 1959, and Saint Fidelis Activities Building in 1962.

The serious work of academic growth took the form of preparing for accreditation of the two schools by the North Central Association of Colleges and Schools. 1963 witnessed a record enrollment of 361 students. Saint Lawrence Seminary and Saint Francis Brothers’ School were accredited by North Central in 1966. On April 1, 1966, the accreditation was completed.

=== Post-Vatican II ===
There was one final building project yet to be completed. The friary on the hill, which had been built after the fire of 1868, needed to be replaced. By 1967 some minor seminaries had already closed. In 1968 Father Rupert Dorn, the Provincial of the Capuchin Province wrote, "We know that some minor seminaries have closed down. Others have become Christian leadership schools ... Recently I was told by a seminary professor, 'The minor seminary is a sinking ship and the sooner we get off it the better'." We cannot predict with any certainty that we will not have to make adjustments at the minor seminary in the future. However, for the present we will work with all our hearts to save the ship."

In that spirit the construction of a new friary and student chapel was undertaken. The former student chapel was converted into an auditorium, and the complex was dedicated in July 1971. Academic requirements in the United States in the late 1960s and the 1970s dictated the discontinuance of the junior college department at Saint Lawrence Seminary. A merger in 1971 between Saint Francis Brothers’ School and Saint Lawrence Seminary brought the Brothers’ School students to the Hill, leaving the former Brothers’ School campus to serve as a residence for the college students who took their courses at Marian College of Fond du Lac or at other colleges in the area.

Father Joseph O’Connor was appointed rector in 1971. Enrollment was 295 students. That number stabilized at about 280 for the next few years. In 1975 opening day enrollment was 320. With many minor seminaries closing, some questioned the reason for the continued high enrollment of Saint Lawrence. Did the young men intend to be priests and brothers or not? The Board of Directors of the seminary discussed whether in 10 or 15 years the philosophy and mission of the seminary would be specifically to prepare candidates for the priesthood and brotherhood, or ministry in any form. Enrollment declined from 276 in 1980 to 203 in 1984.

In 1985 a study of the seminary was commissioned asking: What can Saint Lawrence Seminary do? What can't it do? What, if anything, can it do with excellence? Is there anyone interested in what Saint Lawrence can do? If so, how might it reach those people? The study concluded that one thing Saint Lawrence Seminary could do with excellence was to provide a foundation for a life of ministry in the Church. Priests, brothers, deacons, and lay alumni indicated that the personal relationship with God they developed during their days at Saint Lawrence inspired their adult lives.

The Roman Catholic Church had rearticulated its understanding of ministry and who was called to ministry, stating that ministry was the prerogative of all baptized Catholics. Saint Lawrence Seminary modified its philosophy and mission to include young men who wanted to lay a foundation for a life of ministry in the Church. The study indicated that for an increase in enrollment the school needed to be more selective in the students it accepted. Although the school became more selective, enrollment continued to decline. A turn-around began to take place in 1989. The enrollment rose from 149 in 1989 to 234 in 1994.

=== Sexual abuse allegations ===
In 1992 the Milwaukee Journal published a series of articles alleging the sexual abuse of students by members of the Capuchin Order. The seminary hired a law firm to contact all alumni to ascertain the extent of the problem and offer assistance.

On July 13, 2012, Father Dennis Druggan was removed as rector of the school following allegations of sexual misconduct involving two boys during his tenure at St. Labre Indian Catholic High School in Ashland, Montana between 1984 and 1991. On February 18, Fr. Dennis Druggan was removed from the ministry after a provincial review board stated that there was "sufficient evidence to sustain the allegations". The Rosebud, Montana County Attorney did not pursue an investigation, citing the expiration of the statute of limitations, but stated that the case remains open, since Druggan left the state within ten years of the alleged incident.

== The seminary today ==
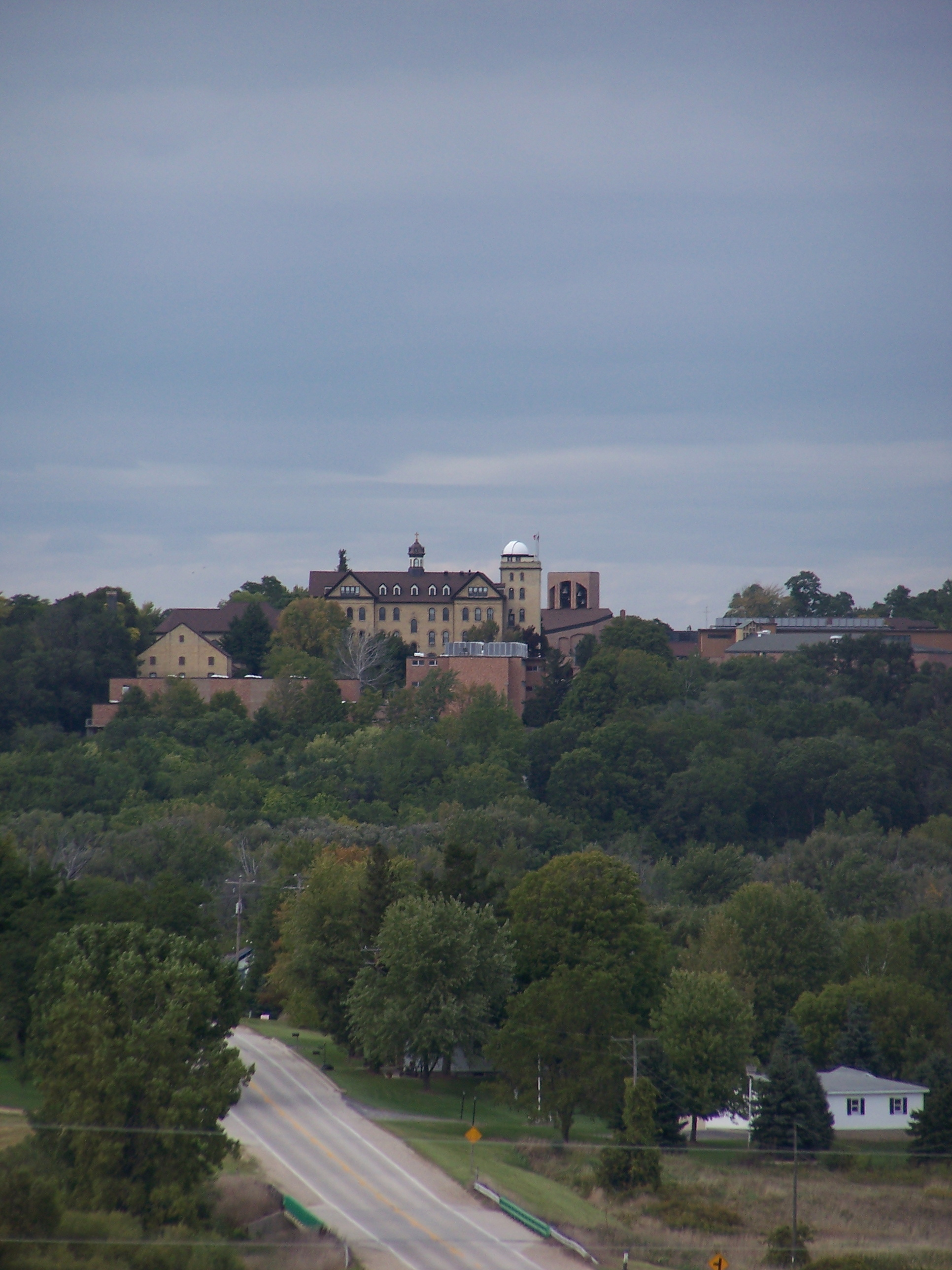
Seminary from the south

Throughout the 1990s and into the 21st century St. Lawrence Seminary has become an increasingly multicultural institution dedicated to preparing young men for a life of ministry within the Catholic Church. St. Lawrence Seminary continues to function as a college preparatory school, partnering with parents and providing for ministry and leadership in the Roman Catholic Church. As of March 2014, the school enrolls approximately 200 students. While students must be Roman Catholic and male, the student body is predominantly Hispanic and Asian.

In the early morning of March 8, 2014, there was a fire at the St. Joseph Hall. It was the oldest building on campus, built in 1872 and was used for admissions and the school band. The building was knocked down to prevent the fire from spreading to other buildings. Deemed of suspicious origin, a fifteen-year-old male was taken into custody on charges of theft and burglary. A brick from St. Joseph's served as the cornerstone for the recently remodeled St. Anthony Hall.

Marian University (Wisconsin) offers the St. Lawrence Seminary Award, partial tuition scholarship for Freshman and Transfer Students who have attended the four consecutive semesters preceding graduation from St. Lawrence Seminary in Mount Calvary.

=== Purpose ===
St. Lawrence Seminary has existed, since its founding in 1860, as a school for Catholic high school and college youth interested in pursuing a vocation to ministry in the Catholic Church, primarily in the priesthood. Underlying the school's philosophy is the conviction that the primary obligation of all Christians is to witness to gospel values in that vocation to which God calls them. Combined with this belief is the additional conviction that such values are not only the path to eternal salvation and union with God for each individual but also the only real remedy for the ills of the human community. Therefore, the staff of St. Lawrence Seminary attempts to promote and foster these values in themselves and in the adolescents who enter into and participate in the life of the community. The overriding purpose for St. Lawrence's existence is to promote, foster, and live principles and values announced in the gospel of Jesus Christ and articulated in the Catholic Church.

=== School seal and motto ===
Banner

Celsitudo ex humilitate is the motto of St. Lawrence Seminary, which has been incorporated into the school seal. Used to describe St. Lawrence of Brindisi, Celsitudo ex humilitate can be translated literally as “To the heavens out of our humility” or more poetically as “To the heights, from the depths.” The seal depicts a cross on a hill with the motto and date of the school's founding.

== Mascot and school colors ==
St. Lawrence Seminary's sports teams are known as “The Hilltoppers”, inspired by the Swiss origins of the school's founders and the hill of Mount Calvary on which St. Lawrence is located. Brown and gold are the school colors, the brown taken from the color of the Capuchin Franciscan habit worn by the friars and the gold being the color that adorns the flag of the Catholic Church.

The St. Lawrence Seminary Alumni Association provides opportunities for alumni of the school to come together to reinforce their ties with the school and each other. The Provincial Minister and Provincial Councilors of the Capuchin Province of St. Joseph serve as the trustees of the school. A Ministry Council, appointed by the Provincial Council, advises the administration and trustees on the seminary's policies and procedures. Members of this council include lay and ordained alumni, educators, Capuchins and the wife and mother of alumni.

== Extracurricular activities ==
The school participates in forensics as a member of the Wisconsin High School Forensic Association and the Wisconsin Forensic Coaches Association. The students publish a yearbook, The Laurentian, annually and a school newspaper, Hilltopics. Each spring the students present either a musical or dramatic play. In addition to performing a Christmas concert and a spring concert, students in the choir and band participate in the solo and ensemble competitions sponsored by the Wisconsin School Music Association. The school participates in a variety of sports and belongs to the Wisconsin Interscholastic Athletic Association and the Wisconsin Flyway Conference.

=== Field Day ===
One of the long-held traditions of St. Lawrence is Field Day. The tradition began in 1907. According to the biography of rector Fr. Benedict Mueller "The rector loved to see his students enjoy themselves to the full in the proper time in place. On Field Day he was meticulously attentive, leaving nothing to chance, personally supervising the making of sandwiches, the purchase of ice cream, soda, and the other trimmings. In 1907 he introduced the custom of holding the annual Field Day on the college grounds. Previously, Field Day had been just that, a day spent some miles away from home grounds in the field of some friendly farmer. A sudden storm sometimes meant a drenching for the crowd of shelterless students and a ruined day. Besides, with the Field Day at home there was a much better opportunity for a variety of athletic events."

In 1972, the Student Council began choosing a word for the theme of the day. The custom is to choose a word that begins with the letter "E". Students use the theme to hold a contest for the best T-shirt design. The tradition continues today with 2020's Field Day being themed as "Epidemic" and featuring virtual competitions.

Students compete by fraternities in a variety of events. The morning traditionally ends with a "Don't be late for Chapel" event, a relay race from the bottom of the hill to the top. A highlight of the afternoon is the customary faculty-student softball game. The afternoon ends with the traditional "Tower Shower" where seniors toss water balloons (some containing money) off the top of the four story tower.

== Notable alumni ==
Since 1860 there have been over 5,000 alumni of the Convent Latin School, St. Lawrence College, St. Francis Brothers' School, and St. Lawrence Seminary. Over 1,500 have been priests. The 3,500 lay alumni have entered a great variety of professions, many have been in involved in active ministry in the Catholic Church.

- † Bishop Apollinaris William Baumgartner OFMCap (Apostolic Vicar of Agana, Guam) - William Baumgartner – 1916−19
- † Bishop Salvador Albert Schlaefer Berg, OFMCap (Apostolic Vicar of Bluefields, Nicaragua) – 1938
- † Fr. Celestine Bittle, OFMCap, 1897−1962; noted author and philosopher, military chaplain, and first principal of Messmer High School in Milwaukee
- † Msgr. Terrence G. Brady, the vicar general of the Archdiocese of Dubuque and rector of St. Raphael Cathedral – 1891−95
- Bishop Fabian Wendelin Bruskewitz (Bishop of Lincoln, NE) – 1949−53
- Bishop Octavio Cisneros (Auxiliary of Brooklyn, NY) – 1962−65
- † Mathias Durbin – 1862−67, first student whose name was recorded
- † Bishop Raphael Michael Fliss (Ordinary of Superior, WI) – 1944−45
- † Fr. Clement Neubaur, OFMCap (Capuchin Minister General) 1908−10
- † Archbishop John F. Noll (Ordinary of Ft. Wayne, IN) – 1888−93
- Bishop Joseph Nathaniel Perry (Auxiliary Chicago, IL) – 1963−66
- † Archbishop Henry Rohlman (Ordinary of Dubuque, IA) – 1892−96
- † George Nauman Shuster - 1907−11, noted author, professor at University of Notre Dame, president of Hunter College
- † Bishop David Albin Zywiec Sidor, OFMCap (Auxiliary of Bluefields, Nicaragua) – David Zywiec – 1961−65
- Bishop Pablo Ervin Schmitz Simon, OFMCap (Ordinary of Bluefields, Nicaragua) – Paul Schmitz – 1958−62
- † Fr. Lawrence Vorwerk, OFMCap 1862−64, earliest student to become a Capuchin
- † Fr. Antonine Wilmer, OFMCap 1872−77, served as rector of St. Lawrence, Provincial Minister, Definitor General, and rector of the college in Rome

† = deceased

== Sources ==
- Baer, C. R. (2005). Lady Poverty revisited: A history of the Province of St. Joseph of the Capuchin Order. Detroit, MI: Capuchin Province of St. Joseph.
- Clark, K. (2004). "Adaptation vs. ideology: Why Saint Lawrence Seminary continues to serve". Seminary Journal. 10 (2): 12–18.
- Clark, Keith (2010). The Dreams of Our Founders & the Hopes of Our Students. The Province of St. Joseph of the Capuchin Order, Inc.
- Jansch, Ronald, OFM Cap. (2007) Bonaventure's Memoirs, a translation. Detroit, MI: Capuchin Province of St. Joseph.
- Vieracker, C. (1924). The Laurentianum: Its Origin and Work (1864-1924). Mt. Calvary, WI: St. Lawrence College Alumni Association.
- Vieracker, C. (2007). The History of Mt. Calvary (Fond Du Lac County, WI). (R. Jansch, trans.). Detroit, MI: Capuchin Province of St. Joseph. (Original work published 1907)
- Zehr, M. A. (2003). "Spiritual guidance," Education Week"", 23(10), 34–39.
