= Trailways Conference =

Wisconsin high school athletic conference

The Trailways Conference is a high school athletic conference in Wisconsin. Formed in 2001, its membership consists of smaller public and private high schools in east central and south central Wisconsin. All member schools belong to the Wisconsin Interscholastic Athletic Association.

== History ==
Location of Original Trailways Conference Members

=== Primary alignment ===
The Trailways Conference was formed in 2001 with most of the members coming from two recently disbanded conferences for small schools in south central Wisconsin: the Dual County Conference (Cambria-Friesland, Fall River, Green Lake, Montello, Pardeeville, Princeton, Randolph, Rio) and the Eastern Suburban Conference (Deerfield, Dodgeland, Hustisford, Johnson Creek and Williams Bay). Two private schools who had recently joined the WIAA as part of the WIAA/WISAA merger (Abundant Life Christian in Madison and Valley Christian in Oshkosh) rounded out the initial membership roster of the Trailways Conference. The fifteen schools were initially subdivided into North and South Divisions:

North Division	South Division
Cambria-Friesland	Abundant Life Christian
Green Lake	Deerfield
Montello	Dodgeland
Pardeeville	Fall River
Princeton	Hustisford
Randolph	Johnson Creek
Valley Christian	Rio
	Williams Bay

Central Wisconsin Christian joined the conference after leaving the East Central Flyway Conference in 2004, and two years later the Trailways Conference took three more former East Central Flyway schools into the fold: Lourdes Academy, Markesan and Oakfield. All three schools joined the North Division with Pardeeville moving over to the South Division to accommodate the expansion:

North Division	South Division
Cambria-Friesland	Abundant Life Christian
Central Wisconsin Christian	Deerfield
Green Lake	Dodgeland
Lourdes Academy	Fall River
Markesan	Hustisford
Montello	Johnson Creek
Oakfield	Pardeeville
Princeton	Rio
Randolph	Williams Bay
Valley Christian	

This alignment would only last for two years, as the Trailways split into Central, North and South Divisions in 2008:

Central Division	North Division	South Division
Cambria-Friesland	Green Lake	Abundant Life Christian
Central Wisconsin Christian	Lourdes Academy	Deerfield
Markesan	Montello	Dodgeland
Pardeeville	Oakfield	Fall River
Randolph	Princeton	Hustisford
	Valley Christian	Johnson Creek
		Rio
		Williams Bay

In 2012, Green Lake and Princeton High Schools entered into a cooperative agreement for their schools' athletics, and the newly created program remained in the North Division. That same year, Horicon and Madison Country Day School in Waunakee joined the Trailways, and Rio moved to the North Division to keep membership at six schools. The Trailways Conference was realigned to a two-division format in 2013:

North Division	South Division
Cambria-Friesland	Abundant Life Christian
Central Wisconsin Christian	Deerfield
Green Lake/Princeton	Dodgeland
Lourdes Academy	Fall River
Markesan	Horicon
Montello	Hustisford
Oakfield	Johnson Creek
Pardeeville	Madison Country Day
Randolph	Rio
Valley Christian	Williams Bay

In 2014, Wayland Academy in Beaver Dam joined the Trailways South Division as its twenty-first member school. The North/South divisional alignment would last for two more years before the Trailways realigned to three divisions in 2016:

Central Division	North Division	South Division
Cambria-Friesland	Green Lake/Princeton	Abundant Life Christian
Central Wisconsin Christian	Lourdes Academy	Deerfield
Horicon	Markesan	Dodgeland
Pardeeville	Montello	Fall River
Randolph	Oakfield	Hustisford
Wayland Academy	Valley Christian	Johnson Creek
		Madison Country Day
		Rio
		Williams Bay

This alignment would only last a single season, as Palmyra-Eagle and Parkview joined the Trailways as all-sport members in 2017 after leaving the Rock Valley Conference, bringing conference membership to the current twenty-three teams (twenty-five schools) and the current East/South/West divisional alignment. In March 2026, the WIAA Board of Controls approved the request of two independent programs to join as full members of the Trailways Conference: St. Ambrose Academy of Madison and The Lincoln Academy of Beloit. St. Ambrose Academy is currently an associate member of the Trailways for several sports, while this will be the first ever conference affiliation for The Lincoln Academy after it opened in 2021. Both additions are planned for the 2027-28 school year and will be coupled with the loss of Hustisford, who made plans to dissolve their school district after an operational referendum failed to pass in April 2026. The district was officially dissolved in November 2026 and its territory and assets will be absorbed entirely by the Dodgeland School District for the 2027-28 school year.

=== Football-only alignment ===
==== 2001-2020 ====
When the Trailways Conference was formed in 2001, football was among the sports offered by the organization. Thirteen of the original fifteen members participated in the first season of competition (including the Fall River/Rio cooperative team), with Abundant Life Christian and Williams Bay being the only holdouts. ALCS did not offer football at that time, and Williams Bay was a football-only member of the Indian Trails Conference. Two members who were affiliated primarily with the Six Rivers Conference (Belleville/Albany and New Glarus/Monticello) rounded out the original membership roster, and they participated in the first five seasons before their exit to join the Capitol Conference for the 2006 football season. The Trailways Conference was subdivided into large-school and small-school divisions for its first season of football:

Trailways Large	Trailways Small
Belleville/Albany	Cambria-Friesland
Dodgeland	Deerfield
Fall River/Rio	Green Lake
Montello	Hustisford
New Glarus/Monticello	Johnson Creek
Pardeeville	Randolph
Princeton	Valley Christian

There were a few cooperative programs that were football participants during the conference's history due to the small size of some of its members, and divisions realigned frequently based on the acquisition of new member schools and changes in enrollment.

==== 2020-present ====
In February 2019, in conjunction with the Wisconsin Football Coaches Association, the WIAA released a sweeping football-only realignment for Wisconsin to commence with the 2020 football season and run on a two-year cycle. In this alignment, the eight original members of the realigned Trailways Conference were Cambria-Friesland, Deerfield, Fall River/Rio, Johnson Creek, Lourdes Academy, Randolph, St John's Northwestern Military Academy and Wayland Academy. Six schools were holdovers from the previous two-division setup, while St. John's Northwestern and Wayland Academy held primary affiliation in the Midwest Classic Conference. For the 2022-2023 cycle, the Trailways Conference picked up Pardeeville from the Eastern Suburban Conference as a replacement for Wayland Academy, which dropped football before returning with an eight-man football team in 2023. In 2024, the Trailways Conference lost three members to the Eastern Suburban Conference (Deerfield, Fall River/Rio and Pardeeville) and St. John's Northwestern to eight-man football and the Southeast-8 Conference. Dodgeland and Palmyra-Eagle moved over from the Eastern Suburban Conference and one school each moved over from the Southwest Wisconsin Activities League (Parkview/Albany) and South Central Conference (Westfield) as replacements for the four exiting members. The Trailways Conference will be experiencing significant changes to football membership for the 2026-2027 cycle. Deerfield and Fall River/Rio make their return from the Eastern Suburban Conference, and Randolph will enter into a cooperative program with Cambria-Friesland. Palmyra-Eagle will be leaving the conference due to their impending transition to eight-man football and membership in the Southeast-8 Conference.

== List of member schools ==
=== Current full members ===
School	Location	Affiliation	Enrollment	Mascot	Colors	Joined	Division
Abundant Life Christian	Madison, WI	Private (Christian)	161	Challengers		2001	South
Cambria-Friesland	Cambria, WI	Public	91	Hilltoppers		2001	West
Central Wisconsin Christian	Waupun, WI	Private (Reformed)	138	Crusaders		2004	East
Deerfield	Deerfield, WI	Public	200	Demons		2001	South
Dodgeland	Juneau, WI	Public	205	Trojans		2001	East
Fall River	Fall River, WI	Public	144	Pirates		2001	West
Green Lake/Princeton	Green Lake, WI & Princeton, WI	Public	174	Tigersharks		2012	West
Horicon	Horicon, WI	Public	225	Marshmen		2012	East
Hustisford (Note: School closing after the 2026-27 school year, district to be folded into Dodgeland)	Hustisford, WI	Public	81	Falcons		2001	East
Johnson Creek	Johnson Creek, WI	Public	179	Bluejays		2001	South
Lourdes Academy	Oshkosh, WI	Private (Catholic)	175	Knights		2006	East
Madison Country Day	Waunakee, WI	Private (Nonsectarian)	137	Prairie Hawks		2012	South
Markesan	Markesan, WI	Public	253	Hornets		2006	West
Montello	Montello, WI	Public	206	Hilltoppers		2001	West
Oakfield	Oakfield, WI	Public	164	Oaks		2006	East
Palmyra-Eagle	Palmyra, WI	Public	144	Panthers		2017	South
Pardeeville	Pardeeville, WI	Public	272	Bulldogs		2001	West
Parkview	Orfordville, WI	Public	290	Vikings		2017	South
Randolph	Randolph, WI	Public	144	Rockets		2001	West
Rio	Rio, WI	Public	102	Vikings		2001	West
Valley Christian	Oshkosh, WI	Private (Christian)	198	Warriors		2001	East
Wayland Academy	Beaver Dam, WI	Private (Nonsectarian)	195	Big Red		2014	East
Williams Bay	Williams Bay, WI	Public	176	Bulldogs		2001	South

=== Current associate members ===
School	Location	Affiliation	Mascot	Colors	Primary Conference	Sport(s)
St. Ambrose Academy	Madison, WI	Private (Catholic)	Guardians		Independent	Boys Cross Country, (Note: Co-operative with Abundant Life Christian) Girls Cross Country
Westfield	Westfield, WI	Public	Pioneers		South Central	Football

=== Future full members ===
School	Location	Affiliation	Enrollment	Mascot	Colors	Joining	Former Conference
St. Ambrose Academy	Madison, WI	Private (Catholic)	136	Guardians		2027	Independent
The Lincoln Academy	Beloit, WI	Charter	206	Lions		2027	Independent

=== Former members ===
School	Location	Affiliation	Mascot	Colors	Joined	Left	Conference Joined	Current Conference
Green Lake	Green Lake, WI	Public	Lakers		2001	2012	Trailways (coop with Princeton)	
Princeton	Princeton, WI	Public	Tigers		2001	2012	Trailways (coop with Green Lake)	

=== Former football-only members ===
School	Location	Affiliation	Mascot	Colors	Seasons	Conference Joined	Primary Conference
Belleville/ Albany	Belleville, WI	Public	Wildcats		2001-2005	Capitol	Six Rivers
New Glarus/ Monticello	New Glarus, WI	Public	Glarner Knights		2001-2005	Capitol	Six Rivers
Oakfield	Oakfield, WI	Public	Oaks		2003-2005	Trailways	East Central Flyway
Palmyra-Eagle	Palmyra, WI	Public	Panthers		2016	Trailways	Rock Valley
Parkview/ Albany	Orfordville, WI	Public	Vikings		2016	Trailways	Rock Valley
St. John's Northwestern	Delafield, WI	Private (Nonsectarian, Military)	Lancers		2020-2023	Southeast-8	Midwest Classic

== Membership timeline ==
=== Full members ===
North Division South Division Central Division East Division West Division

=== Football members ===
Large Schools Small Schools

== Membership map ==
Trailways Conference
Location of Trailways Conference full members:
1 Abundant Life Christian
2 Cambria-Friesland
3 Central Wisconsin Christian
4 Deerfield
5 Dodgeland
6 Fall River
7 Green Lake
8 Horicon
9 Hustisford
10 Johnson Creek
11 Lourdes Academy
12 Madison Country Day
13 Markesan
14 Montello
15 Oakfield
16 Palmyra-Eagle
17 Pardeeville
18 Parkview
19 Princeton
20 Randolph
21 Rio
22 Valley Christian
23 Wayland Academy
24 Williams Bay

== Sponsored sports ==
	Baseball	Boys Basketball	Girls Basketball	Boys Cross Country	Girls Cross Country	Football	Boys Golf	Softball	Boys Track & Field	Girls Track & Field	Girls Volleyball	Boys Wrestling	Girls Wrestling
Abundant Life Christian	● (Note: Co-operative with Madison Country Day and St. Ambrose Academy)	●	● (Note: Co-operative with St. Ambrose Academy)				●		●	●	●		
Cambria-Friesland	● (Note: Co-operative with Randolph)	●	●					●			●		
Central Wisconsin Christian	●	●	●	●	●		●		●	●	●		
Deerfield	●	●	●			●		●	●	●	●	●	●
Dodgeland		● (Note: Co-operative with Hustisford)	●	●	●	●		●	●	●	●	●	●
Fall River	●	●	●			● (Note: Co-operative with Rio)		●	●	●	●	● (Note: Co-operative with Cambria-Friesland, Randolph and Rio)	●
Horicon	●	●	●	●	●		●	●	●	●	●	●	●
Hustisford	● (Note: Co-operative with Dodgeland)												
Johnson Creek	●	●	●	●	●	●		●	●	●	●	●	●
Lourdes Academy	●	●	●	●	●	●	●	●	●	●	●	●	●
Madison Country Day		●	●	●	●				●	●	●		
Markesan	●	●	●	●	●		●	●	●	●	●	●	●
Montello	●	●	●				●	●	●	●	●	●	●
Oakfield		●	●	●	●		●	●	●	●	●	● (Note: Co-operative with Mayville)	●
Palmyra-Eagle	●	●	●	●	●		●	●	●	●	●	●	●
Pardeeville	●	●	●	●	●		●	●	●	●	●	●	●
Parkview	●	●	●	●	●	● (Note: Co-operative with Albany)	●	●	●	●	●	●	●
Princeton/ Green Lake	● (Note: Hosted by Green Lake)	● (Note: Hosted by Princeton)	●	●	●		●	●	●	●	●	●	●
Randolph		●	●	● (Note: Co-operative with Cambria-Friesland)	●	●	●	●	●	●	●		
Rio	●	●	●	● (Note: Co-operative with Fall River)	●				●	●	●		
Valley Christian		●	●	●	●				●	●	●		
Wayland Academy	●	●	●	●	●		●	●	●	●	●	●	●
Williams Bay	●	●	●				●	●			●		

== List of state champions ==
=== Fall sports ===
Boys Cross Country
School	Year	Division
Pardeeville	2002	Division 3

Girls Cross Country
School	Year	Division
Lourdes Academy	2010	Division 3
Lourdes Academy	2011	Division 3
Lourdes Academy	2013	Division 3
Lourdes Academy	2014	Division 3
Lourdes Academy	2015	Division 3
Dodgeland	2017	Division 3
Lourdes Academy	2019	Division 3

Football
School	Year	Division
Cambria-Friesland	2002	Division 7

Girls Volleyball
School	Year	Division
Williams Bay	2003	Division 4
Williams Bay	2004	Division 4
Williams Bay	2005	Division 4

=== Winter sports ===
Boys Basketball
School	Year	Division
Randolph	2002	Division 4
Randolph	2003	Division 4
Randolph	2004	Division 4
Randolph	2005	Division 4
Randolph	2007	Division 4
Randolph	2010	Division 4
Randolph	2011	Division 5
Randolph	2013	Division 5
Hustisford	2021	Division 5
Lourdes Academy	2021	Division 4
Randolph	2022	Division 5

Girls Basketball
School	Year	Division
Oakfield	1979	Division C
Johnson Creek	1984	Division C
Randolph	2022	Division 5

=== Spring sports ===
Baseball
School	Year	Division
Johnson Creek	2007	Division 4
Rio	2015	Division 4
Johnson Creek	2025	Division 4

Softball
School	Year	Division
Horicon	2002	Division 3
Horicon	2003	Division 3
Williams Bay	2007	Division 4
Oakfield	2009	Division 4
Oakfield	2011	Division 4
Oakfield	2012	Division 4
Oakfield	2014	Division 4
Horicon	2018	Division 4
Horicon	2019	Division 4
Oakfield	2021	Division 5

Girls Track & Field
School	Year	Division
Lourdes Academy	2014	Division 3
Deerfield	2024	Division 3

== List of conference champions ==
=== Boys Basketball ===
School	Quantity	Years
Randolph	17	2002, 2003, 2004, 2005, 2006, 2007, 2008, 2009, 2010, 2011, 2012, 2013, 2019, 2020, 2021, 2022, 2024
Lourdes Academy	11	2009, 2011, 2012, 2013, 2014, 2015, 2018, 2019, 2020, 2021, 2024
Deerfield	9	2011, 2013, 2016, 2017, 2018, 2022, 2023, 2024, 2025
Fall River	5	2009, 2012, 2013, 2014, 2023
Hustisford	4	2004, 2005, 2006, 2015
Oakfield	4	2022, 2024, 2025, 2026
Pardeeville	4	2017, 2018, 2024, 2025
Williams Bay	4	2003, 2007, 2008, 2021
Abundant Life Christian	3	2024, 2025, 2026
Markesan	3	2016, 2020, 2026
Palmyra-Eagle	3	2018, 2019, 2020
Central Wisconsin Christian	1	2023
Dodgeland	1	2002
Green Lake	1	2010
Horicon	1	2015
Parkview	1	2026
Rio	1	2010
Valley Christian	1	2017
Cambria-Friesland	0	
Johnson Creek	0	
Madison Country Day	0	
Montello	0	
Princeton	0	
Princeton/ Green Lake	0	
Wayland Academy	0	

=== Girls Basketball ===
School	Quantity	Years
Lourdes Academy	14	2009, 2010, 2011, 2012, 2013, 2014, 2016, 2017, 2018, 2019, 2023, 2024, 2025, 2026
Deerfield	10	2002, 2010, 2011, 2012, 2020, 2022, 2023, 2024, 2025, 2026
Markesan	9	2007, 2008, 2009, 2010, 2011, 2012, 2013, 2015, 2019
Fall River	8	2011, 2013, 2014, 2015, 2016, 2017, 2018, 2020
Randolph	7	2005, 2006, 2009, 2021, 2022, 2023, 2024
Hustisford	4	2004, 2006, 2008, 2009
Oakfield	4	2009, 2020, 2021, 2022
Pardeeville	3	2002, 2025, 2026
Rio	3	2005, 2007, 2017
Cambria-Friesland	2	2003, 2004
Palmyra-Eagle	2	2018, 2021
Abundant Life Christian	1	2003
Central Wisconsin Christian	1	2010
Parkview	1	2019
Valley Christian	1	2026
Dodgeland	0	
Green Lake	0	
Horicon	0	
Johnson Creek	0	
Madison Country Day	0	
Montello	0	
Princeton	0	
Princeton/ Green Lake	0	
Wayland Academy	0	
Williams Bay	0	

=== Football ===
School	Quantity	Years
Cambria-Friesland	10	2001, 2002, 2004, 2005, 2006, 2009, 2014, 2015, 2016, 2022
Lourdes Academy	6	2011, 2013, 2019, 2021, 2025, 2026
Pardeeville	6	2005, 2006, 2007, 2008, 2009, 2010
Randolph	6	2003, 2009, 2010, 2011, 2012, 2020
Johnson Creek	4	2005, 2007, 2023, 2024
Fall River	3	2013, 2017, 2018
Markesan	3	2015, 2016, 2017
New Glarus/ Monticello	3	2001, 2002, 2005
Deerfield	2	2012, 2014
Horicon/ Hustisford	2	2018, 2019
Oakfield	2	2003, 2004
Dodgeland	1	2004
Hustisford	1	2005
Randolph/ Cambria-Friesland	1	2026
Rio	1	2008
Abundant Life Christian	0	
Belleville/ Albany	0	
Fall River/ Rio	0	
Green Lake	0	
Horicon	0	
Montello	0	
Montello/ Princeton	0	
Montello/ Princeton/ Green Lake	0	
Palmyra-Eagle	0	
Parkview/ Albany	0	
Princeton	0	
St. John's Northwestern	0	
Valley Christian	0	
Wayland Academy	0	
Westfield	0	
