= Dodgeland High School =

Location
- 401 S. Western Avenue; Juneau, Wisconsin 53039

Information
- District: Dodgeland School District
- Teaching staff: 21.11 (FTE)
- Grades: 9-12
- Enrollment: 262 (2023-2024)
- Student to teacher ratio: 12.41
- Color
- Mascot: Trojans
- Athletic Conference: Trailways
- Website: https://www.dodgeland.k12.wi.us/schools/high/
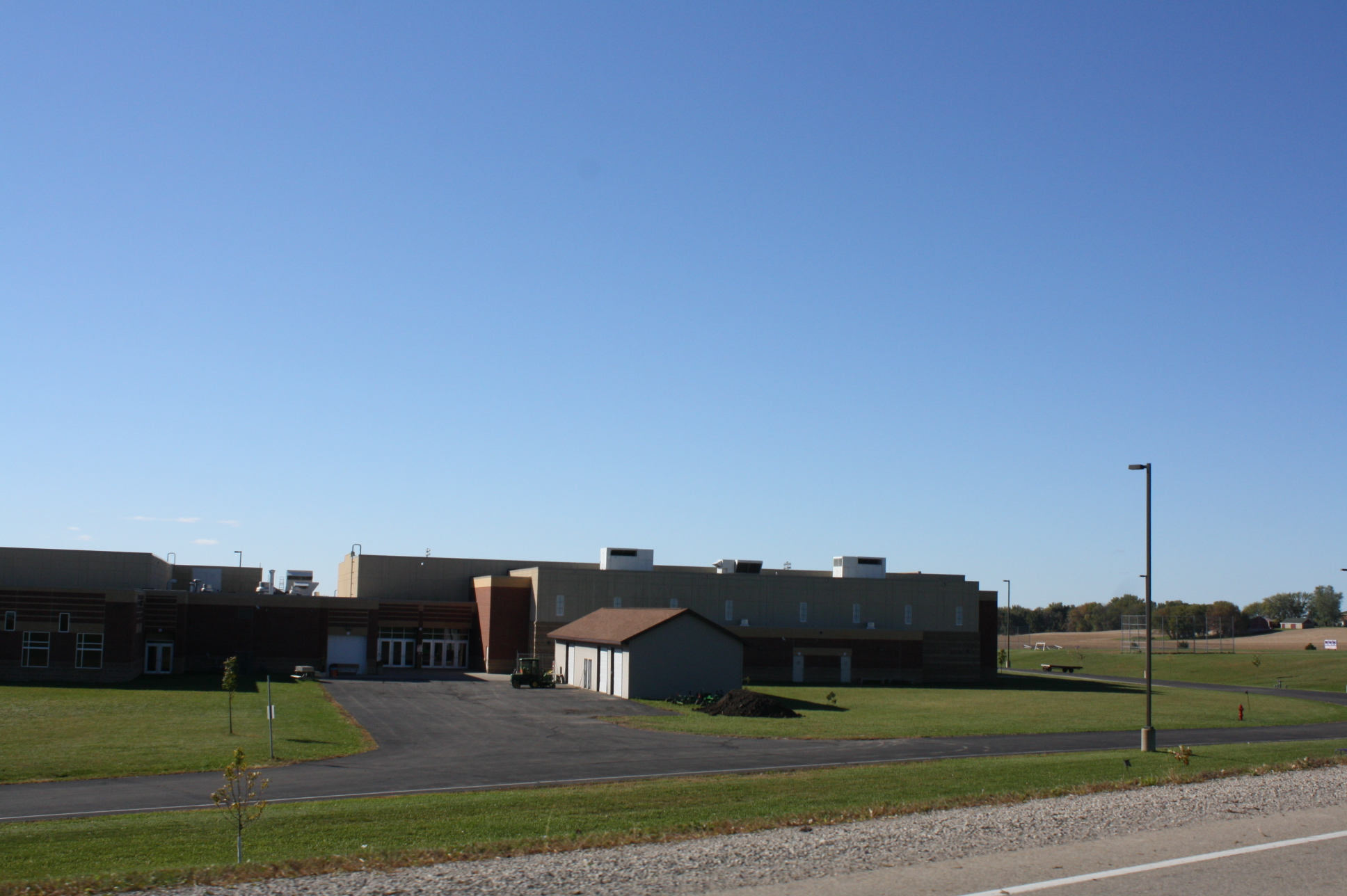
- Dodgeland High School

Dodgeland High School is a public school located in Juneau, Wisconsin. It forms part of the Dodgeland School District. Its mascot is the Trojan.
