= Winnebago Lutheran Academy =

Private Wisconsin high school

Coordinates: 43.7813°N 88.428°W

- 475 East Merril Avenue; Fond du Lac, Wisconsin, U.S.

Information
- Type: Private secondary school
- Religious affiliation: Wisconsin Evangelical Lutheran Synod
- Founded: 1925
- Principal: David Schroeder
- Faculty: 24.9
- Grades: 9 to 12
- Gender: Co-ed
- Enrollment: 303
- Colors: Blue and white
- Teams: Vikings
- Affiliation: WLA Association
- Website: www.wlavikings.org

Winnebago Lutheran Academy, also known as WLA, is a private Lutheran high school in Fond du Lac, Wisconsin, associated with the Wisconsin Evangelical Lutheran Synod (WELS).

== History ==
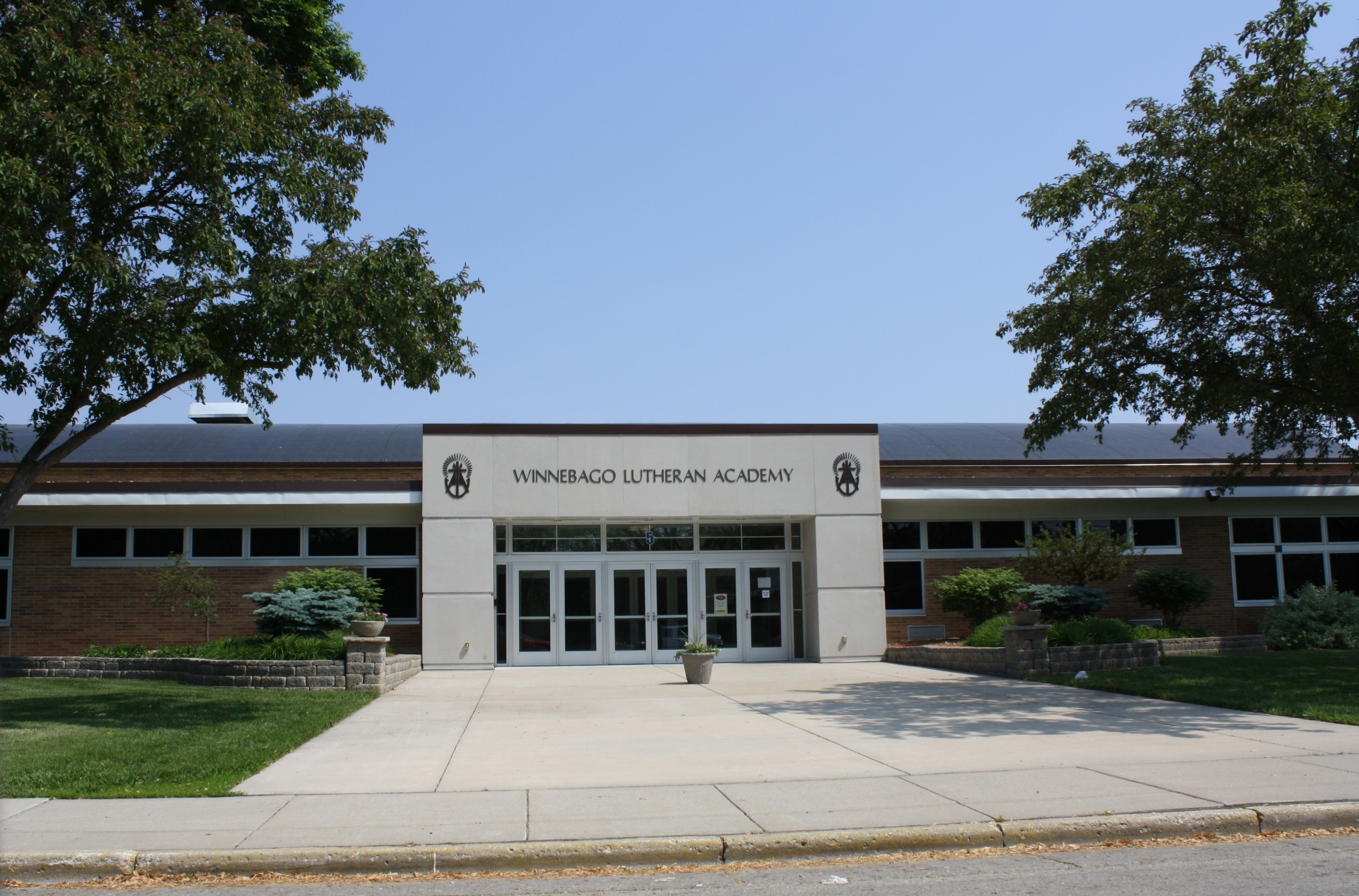
The main entrance of Winnebago Lutheran Academy

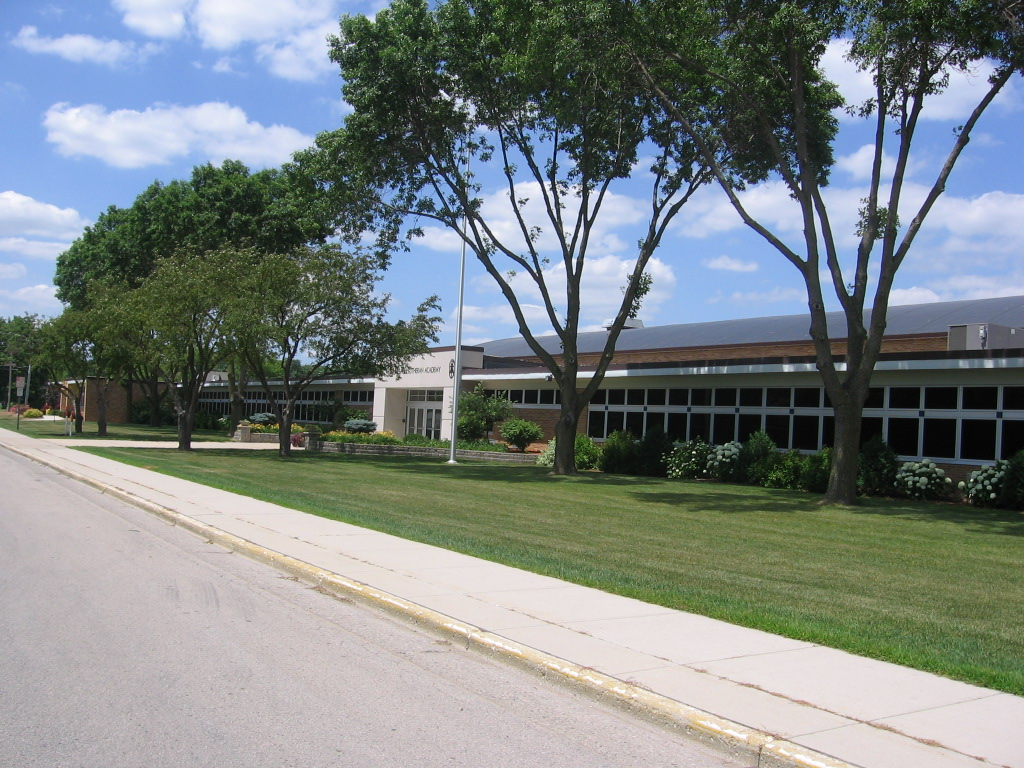
The front of Winnebago Lutheran Academy

WLA was founded in 1925 by St. Peter's Lutheran Church in Fond du Lac. After its start at the corner of Second and Marr streets in downtown Fond du Lac next to St. Peter's Church, the academy was moved in 1955 to its current location at 475 E. Merrill Avenue.

It is the parent school of WLA Schools, a group of Lutheran grade schools. The schools are located within a 50-mile (80 km) radius of Fond du Lac.

On September 30, 2020, WLA bought 120 acres (49 ha) of land west of Fond du Lac and intends to build a new campus at this location. The land is located between Highway 23 and Highway OOO.

== Demographics ==
As of the 2017–18 school year, WLA enrolled 303 students, 288 of whom were white, 11 were Asian, three were black, and one was Hispanic.

== Athletics ==
The athletic teams at Winnebago Lutheran Academy are known as the Vikings and their colors are royal blue and white. They compete in the Wisconsin Flyway Conference of the Wisconsin Interscholastic Athletic Association. The Vikings have won one WIAA state championship, the 2011 Division 3 baseball championship.

Their primary rival is the Ledgers of St. Mary Springs High School, also in Fond du Lac. They also have a rivalry with Chargers of Kettle Moraine Lutheran High School, another WELS high school.
