= Mount Calvary, Wisconsin =

- Village
- Location of Mount Calvary in Fond du Lac County, Wisconsin.
- Coordinates: 43°49′32″N 88°14′53″W
- Country: United States
- State: Wisconsin
- County: Fond du Lac

Area
  - Total: 1.06 sq mi (2.74 km^{2})
  - Land: 1.06 sq mi (2.74 km^{2})
  - Water: 0 sq mi (0.00 km^{2})
- Elevation: 958 ft (292 m)

Population (2020)
  - Total: 548
  - Density: 519/sq mi (200.4/km^{2})
- Time zone: UTC-6 (Central (CST))
  - Summer (DST): UTC-5 (CDT)
- ZIP Code: 53057
- Area code: 920
- FIPS code: 55-54650
- GNIS feature ID: 1569802
- Website: https://villageofmtcalvary.com/

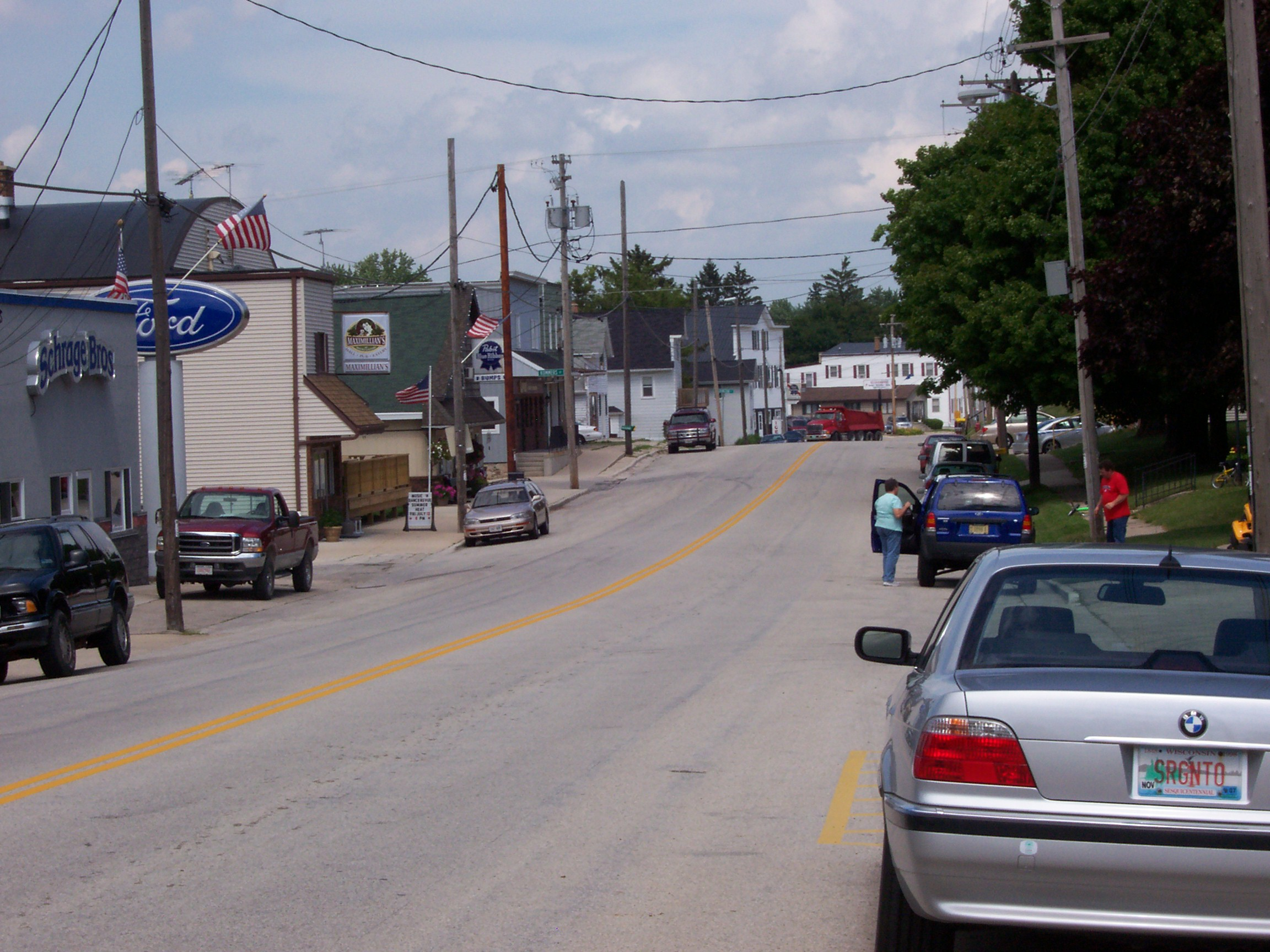
Downtown Mount Calvary

Mount Calvary is a village in Fond du Lac County, Wisconsin, United States. The population was 548 at the 2020 census, down from 762 at the 2010 census.

== History ==
Mount Calvary's location was chosen by missionary Casper Rehrl; he selected the large hill because of its excellent view and he placed a wood cross. Starting in 1846, settlers started building houses at the base of the hill. Riehl held the community's first mass circa 1849 at the home of John Dietzen. Bishop John Henni confirmed the first child from Mount Calvary at the St. John the Baptist Church in nearby Johnsburg (it was the only church in the region). A parish was established in Mount Calvary by Rehrl on February 2, 1849; construction of the church began on the following day. A school was established by the church and it quickly had five or six students.

The community's first general store was built in 1851–1852. Two priests arrived on October 15, 1856, to establish a monastery (it later became the St. Lawrence Seminary High School). A post office was built in November 1877; Anthony Rothgery was named first postmaster. A railroad was established in the 1850s and 1860s; it connected Sheboygan to Fond du Lac. Trains ran twice daily through nearby Calvary Station.

== Geography ==
Mount Calvary is located at 43°49′32″N 88°14′53″W (43.825664, -88.248114).

According to the United States Census Bureau, the village has a total area of 1.05 square miles (2.72 km^{2}), all land.

Mount Calvary is located in an eastern Fond du Lac County area known as "The Holyland", so called because of the large number of communities built around churches, including St. Peter, St. Cloud, St. Anna, Marytown, Johnsburg, Calvary, Brothertown and Jericho.

== Demographics ==
Historical population
Census	Pop.	Note	%±
1970	942		—
1980	585		−37.9%
1990	558		−4.6%
2000	956		71.3%
2010	762		−20.3%
2020	548		−28.1%
U.S. Decennial Census

=== 2020 ===
As of the census of 2020, there were 548 people, and 259 households in the village. The population density was 517.0 inhabitants per square mile (199.6/km^{2}). There were 218 housing units at an average density of 205.7 per square mile (79.4/km^{2}). The racial makeup of the village was 96.9% White, 0.2% Black or African American, 0.2% Native American, 0.2% Asian, 0.2% from other races, and 2.4% from two or more races. Hispanic or Latino of any race were 1.5% of the population.

=== 2010 census ===
As of the census of 2010, there were 762 people, 201 households, and 151 families living in the village. The population density was 725.7 inhabitants per square mile (280.2/km^{2}). There were 215 housing units at an average density of 204.8 per square mile (79.1/km^{2}). The racial makeup of the village was 83.6% White, 1.3% African American, 1.0% Native American, 8.3% Asian, 5.2% from other races, and 0.5% from two or more races. Hispanic or Latino of any race were 10.9% of the population.

There were 201 households, of which 32.8% had children under the age of 18 living with them, 66.2% were married couples living together, 6.0% had a female householder with no husband present, 3.0% had a male householder with no wife present, and 24.9% were non-families. 21.9% of all households were made up of individuals, and 8% had someone living alone who was 65 years of age or older. The average household size was 2.59 and the average family size was 3.01.

The median age in the village was 26.8 years. 39.6% of residents were under the age of 18; 8.2% were between the ages of 18 and 24; 19.4% were from 25 to 44; 16.6% were from 45 to 64; and 16.1% were 65 years of age or older. The gender makeup of the village was 63.5% male and 36.5% female.

=== 2000 census ===
As of the census of 2000, there were 956 people, 199 households, and 141 families living in the village. The population density was 902.0 people per square mile (348.2/km^{2}). There were 206 housing units at an average density of 194.4 per square mile (75.0/km^{2}). The racial makeup of the village was 84.21% White, 0.42% African American, 0.52% Native American, 6.69% Asian, 7.74% from other races, and 0.42% from two or more races. Hispanic or Latino of any race were 8.37% of the population.

There were 199 households, out of which 36.7% had children under the age of 18 living with them, 62.3% were married couples living together, 6.5% had a female householder with no husband present, and 29.1% were non-families. 25.1% of all households were made up of individuals, and 12.6% had someone living alone who was 65 years of age or older. The average household size was 2.50 and the average family size was 2.99.

In the village, the population was spread out, with 33.6% under the age of 18, 7.5% from 18 to 24, 16.0% from 25 to 44, 16.9% from 45 to 64, and 25.9% who were 65 years of age or older. The median age was 38 years. For every 100 females, there were 149.0 males. For every 100 females age 18 and over, there were 93.0 males.

The median income for a household in the village was $50,104, and the median income for a family was $53,333. Males had a median income of $42,031 versus $23,462 for females. The per capita income for the village was $13,631. About 4.8% of families and 35.6% of the population were below the poverty line, including 9.2% of those under age 18 and 45.2% of those age 65 or over.

== Education ==
Mount Calvary is in the New Holstein Public School District. It is also served by the Consolidated Parochial Elementary and Middle School called Holyland Catholic School formerly called C.P.E.S.. Recently, Holyland Catholic School lost its Mount Calvary location, but is still supported by Holy Cross Church in Mount Calvary. It is also home to St. Lawrence Seminary High School, a Catholic preparatory high school.

Saint Paul's Lutheran School is a grade school (Pre-K-8) of the Wisconsin Evangelical Lutheran Synod near Mount Calvary (in the Town of Forest).

== Notable people ==
- Heinie Beau – American jazz composer
- Viola Smith – swing band drummer

== Images ==
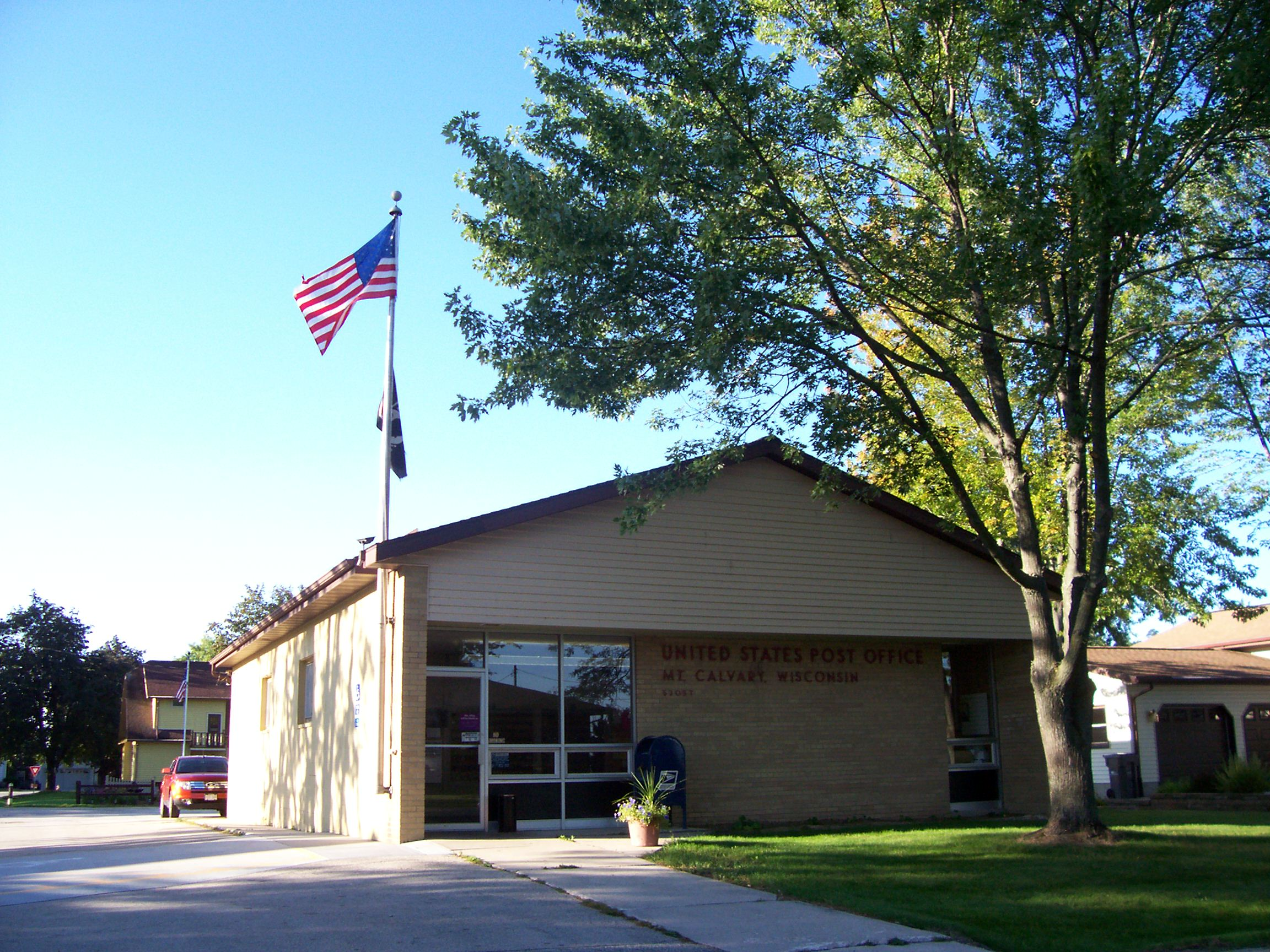
Post office

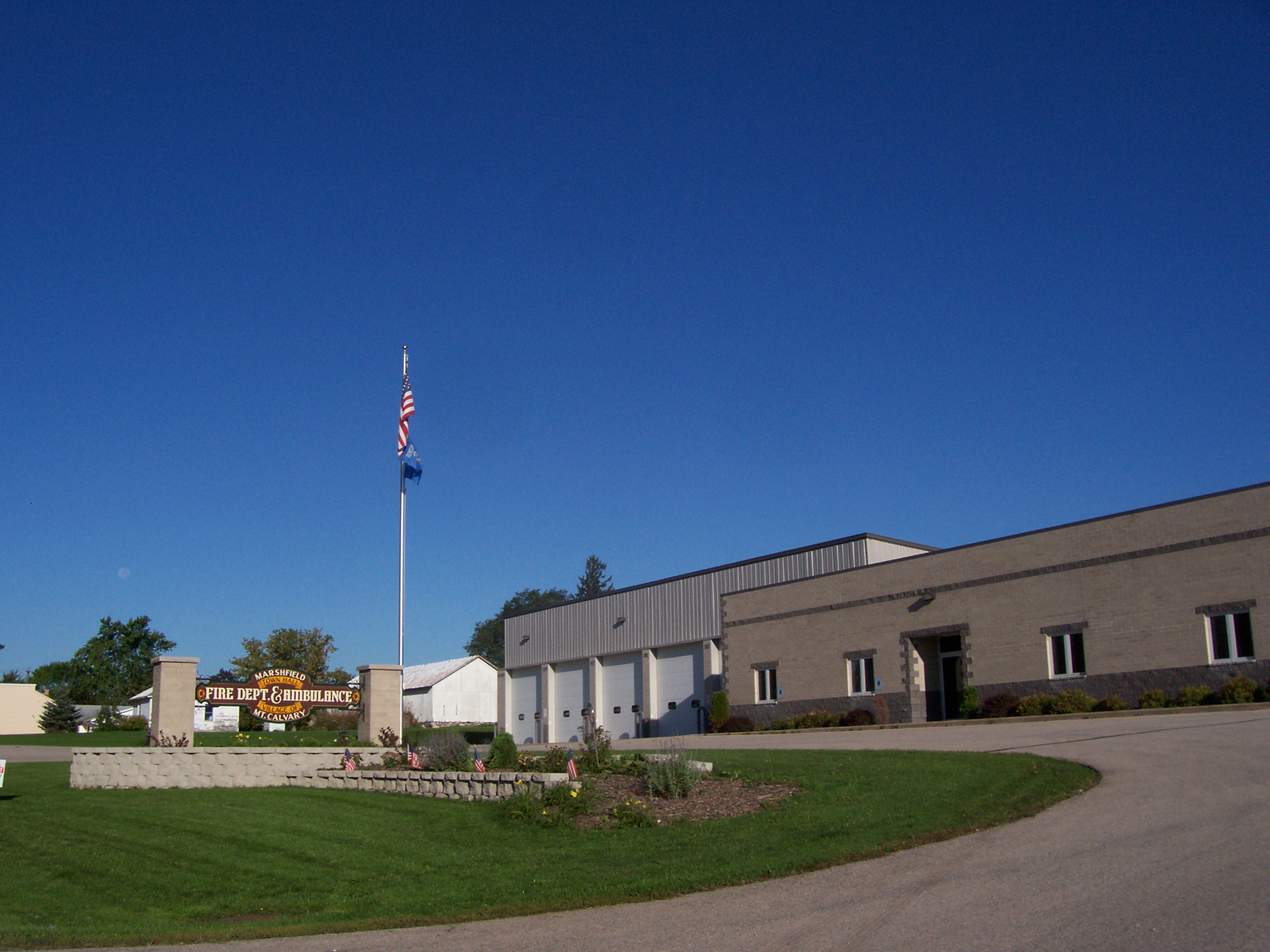
Fire station

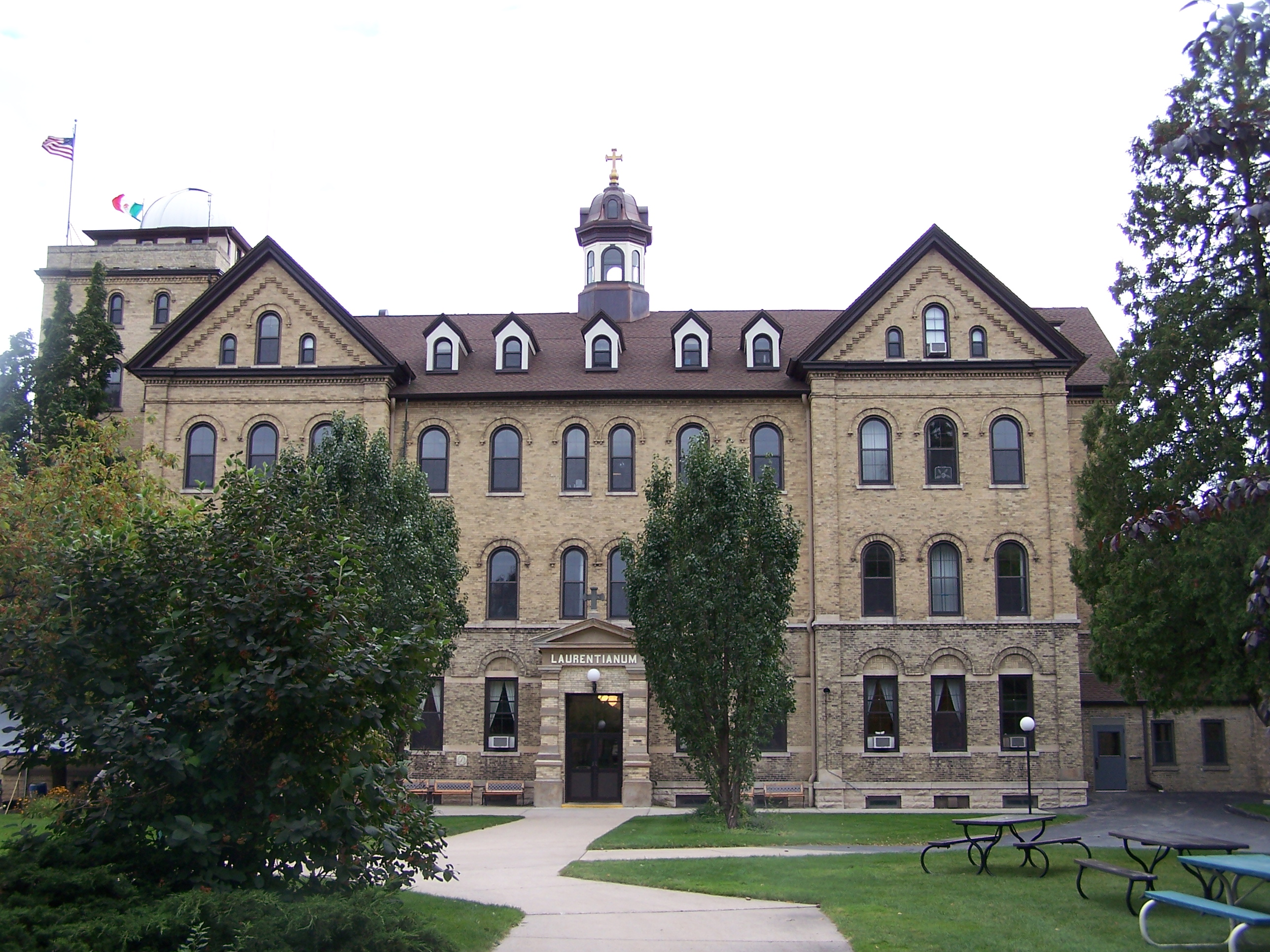
St. Lawrence Seminary High School

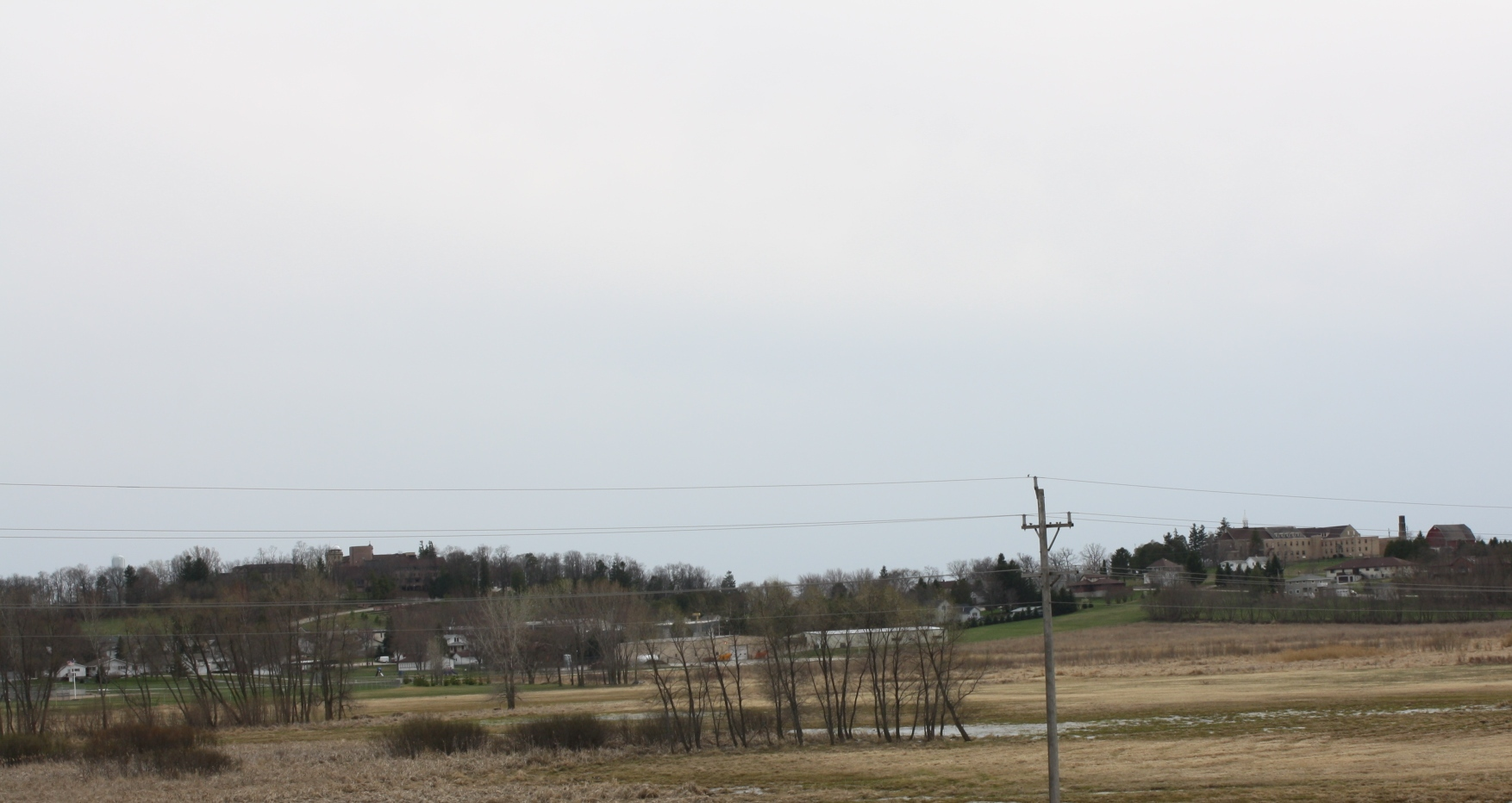
Panorama

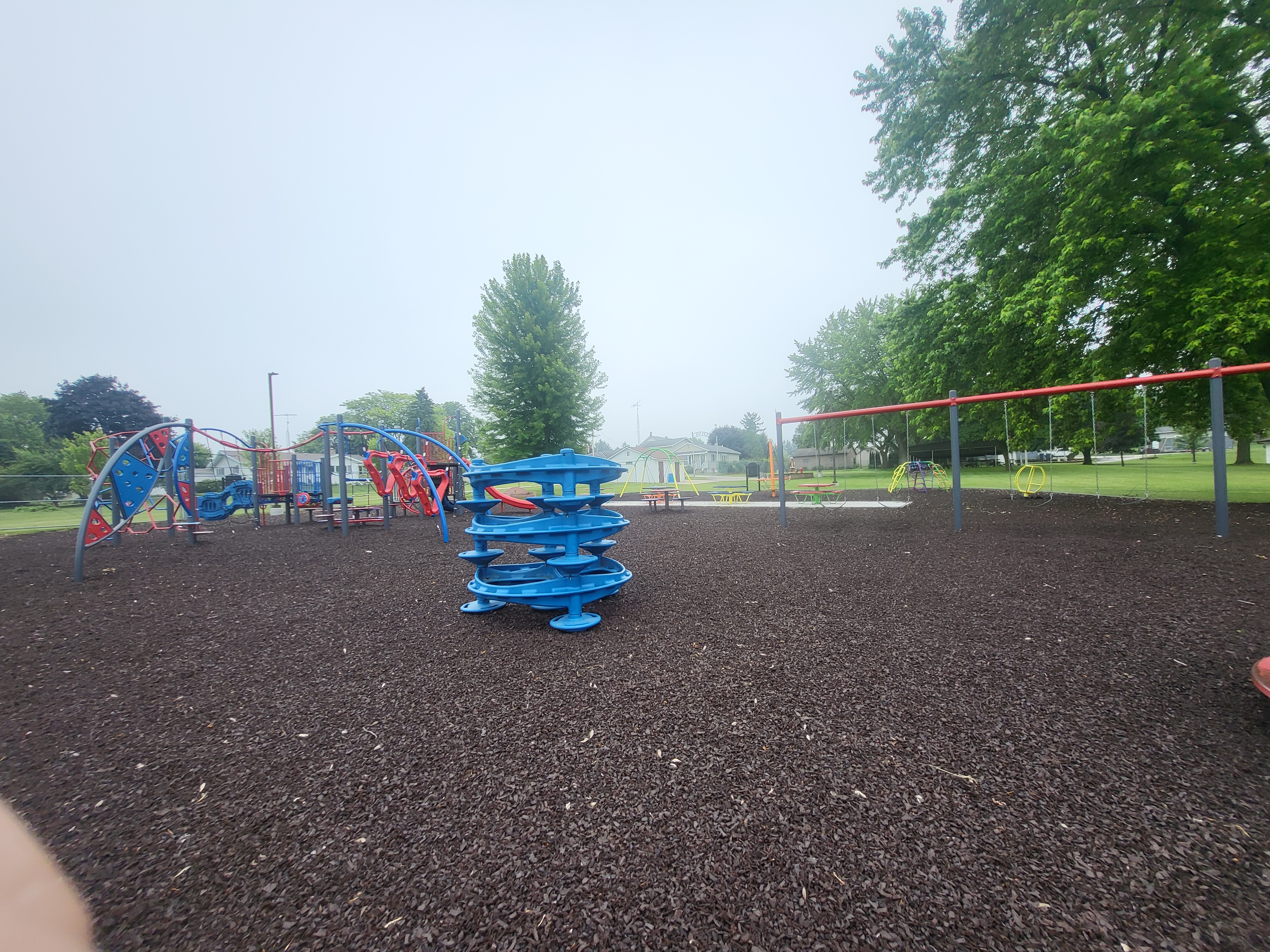
Mt Calvary Fireman's Park
