= Tomorrow Valley =

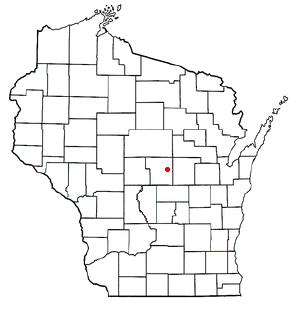
- Location of Tomorrow Valley, Wisconsin
- Coordinates: 44°29′35″N 89°18′44″W
- Country: United States
- State: Wisconsin
- County: Portage

Area
  - Total: 42 sq mi (110 km^{2})
  - Land: 41.02 sq mi (106.2 km^{2})
  - Water: 0.98 sq mi (2.5 km^{2})
- Elevation: 1,073 ft (327 m)

Population (2000)
  - Total: 2,983
  - Density: 71.02/sq mi (27.42/km^{2})
- Time zone: UTC-6 (Central (CST))
  - Summer (DST): UTC-5 (CDT)
- Postal codes: 54406, 54407, 54458
- FIPS code: 55-56000
- GNIS feature ID: 1570168

The Tomorrow Valley refers to the area along the Tomorrow River in Portage County, Wisconsin. The village of Amherst, Wisconsin is the core of the Tomorrow Valley area, which also includes the villages of Nelsonville and Amherst Junction, and the Town of Amherst. It is part of the Stevens Point, Wisconsin Micropolitan Statistical Area.

== Education ==
The area is served by the Tomorrow River School District, known as TRSD or TR Schools, which consists of a pre-K-12 school system in a single 160,000 sq. ft. building in Amherst. The building is separated into three sections, Amherst Elementary (pre-K through 5th grade), Amherst Middle School, or AMS (6th-8th grades), and Amherst High School, or AHS (9th-12th grades). There are about 75 students per grade.

== Community institutions ==
The Tomorrow Valley area is home to the Lettie Jensen Community Center, the Lettie Jensen Library, two banks, three post offices, a supermarket, three hair salons, ten taverns, two antique shops, two gas stations, a video rental store, a law office, a brewery, an industrial park, a co-op, a coffee shop, an ice cream shop, fast food restaurant, and several churches.

== Transportation ==
US 10 travels east to Waupaca, WI and Detroit and west to Stevens Point, Wisconsin, and Fargo.
WIS 54 travels east to Waupaca/ King and New London and west to Stevens Point/Plover-Whiting and Onalaska.
