= List of villages in Wisconsin =

Wisconsin municipalities with villages in green

This is a list of incorporated villages in the U.S. state of Wisconsin, arranged in alphabetical order. As of May 2026, there are 419 villages in Wisconsin.

== List of villages ==
Village	County(ies)	Population (2010 Census)	Population (2020 Census)	Incorporation date
Adell	Sheboygan	516	498	1918
Albany	Green	1,018	1,096	1883
Allouez	Brown	13,975	14,156	1986
Alma Center	Jackson	503	487	1902
Almena	Barron	677	705	1945
Almond	Portage	448	424	1905
Amherst	Portage	1,035	1,117	1899
Amherst Junction	Portage	377	383	1912
Aniwa	Shawano	260	243	1899
Arena	Iowa	834	844	1923
Argyle	Lafayette	857	783	1903
Arlington	Columbia	819	844	1945
Arpin	Wood	333	305	1978
Ashwaubenon	Brown	16,963	16,991	1977
Athens	Marathon	1,105	1,059	1901
Auburndale	Wood	703	702	1881
Avoca	Iowa	637	553	1870
Bagley	Grant	379	356	1919
Baldwin	St. Croix	3,957	4,291	1875
Balsam Lake	Polk	1,009	934	1905
Bangor	La Crosse	1,459	1,437	1899
Barneveld	Iowa	1,231	1,331	1906
Bay City	Pierce	500	441	1909
Bayside	Milwaukee; Ozaukee	4,389	4,482	1953
Bear Creek	Outagamie	448	427	1902
Belgium	Ozaukee	2,245	2,421	1922
Bell Center	Crawford	117	108	1901
Belleville	Dane; Green	2,385	2,491	1892
Bellevue	Brown	14,570	15,935	2003
Belmont	Lafayette	986	989	1894
Benton	Lafayette	973	946	1892
Big Bend	Waukesha	1,290	1,483	1928
Big Falls	Waupaca	61	60	1925
Birchwood	Washburn	442	402	1921
Birnamwood	Marathon; Shawano	813	760	1895
Biron	Wood	839	839	1910
Black Creek	Outagamie	1,316	1,357	1904
Black Earth	Dane	1,338	1,493	1857
Blanchardville	Iowa; Lafayette	825	807	1890
Bloomfield	Walworth	N/A	4,781	2011
Bloomington	Grant	735	741	1880
Blue Mounds	Dane	855	948	1912
Blue River	Grant	434	457	1916
Boaz	Richland	156	129	1939
Bonduel	Shawano	1,478	1,417	1916
Bowler	Shawano	302	320	1923
Boyceville	Dunn	1,086	1,100	1922
Boyd	Chippewa	552	605	1891
Brandon	Fond du Lac	879	882	1881
Bristol	Kenosha	2,584	5,192	2009
Brooklyn	Dane; Green	1,401	1,524	1905
Brown Deer	Milwaukee	11,999	12,507	1955
Brownsville	Dodge	581	598	1952
Browntown	Green	280	245	1890
Bruce	Rusk	779	781	1901
Butler	Waukesha	1,841	1,787	1913
Butternut	Ashland	375	366	1903
Cadott	Chippewa	1,437	1,498	1895
Caledonia	Racine	24,705	25,361	2005
Cambria	Columbia	767	777	1866
Cambridge	Dane; Jefferson	1,457	1,638	1891
Cameron	Barron	1,783	1,872	1894
Camp Douglas	Juneau	601	647	1893
Campbellsport	Fond du Lac	2,016	1,907	1902
Cascade	Sheboygan	709	722	1914
Casco	Kewaunee	583	630	1920
Cashton	Monroe	1,102	1,158	1901
Cassville	Grant	947	777	1882
Catawba	Price	110	141	1922
Cazenovia	Richland; Sauk	318	363	1902
Cecil	Shawano	570	529	1905
Cedar Grove	Sheboygan	2,113	2,101	1899
Centuria	Polk	948	891	1904
Chaseburg	Vernon	284	241	1922
Chenequa	Waukesha	590	526	1928
Clayton	Polk	571	550	1909
Clear Lake	Polk	1,070	1,099	1894
Cleveland	Manitowoc	1,485	1,579	1958
Clinton	Rock	2,154	2,221	1882
Clyman	Dodge	422	397	1924
Cobb	Iowa	458	480	1902
Cochrane	Buffalo	450	423	1910
Coleman	Marinette	724	726	1903
Colfax	Dunn	1,158	1,182	1904
Coloma	Waushara	450	448	1939
Combined Locks	Outagamie	3,328	3,634	1920
Conrath	Rusk	95	88	1915
Coon Valley	Vernon	765	758	1907
Cottage Grove	Dane	6,192	7,303	1924
Couderay	Sawyer	88	81	1922
Crivitz	Marinette	984	1,093	1974
Cross Plains	Dane	3,538	4,104	1920
Curtiss	Clark	216	292	1917
Dallas	Barron	409	359	1903
Dane	Dane	995	1,117	1899
Darien	Walworth	1,580	1,573	1951
DeForest	Dane	8,936	10,811	1903
De Soto	Crawford; Vernon	287	309	1886
Deer Park	St. Croix	216	249	1913
Deerfield	Dane	2,507	2,540	1891
Denmark	Brown	2,123	2,408	1915
Dickeyville	Grant	1,061	1,015	1947
Dorchester	Clark; Marathon	876	849	1901
Dousman	Waukesha	2,302	2,419	1917
Downing	Dunn	265	234	1909
Doylestown	Columbia	297	280	1907
Dresser	Polk	895	935	1919
Eagle	Waukesha	1,950	2,071	1899
East Troy	Walworth	4,281	4,687	1900
Eastman	Crawford	428	350	1909
Eden	Fond du Lac	875	884	1912
Edgar	Marathon	1,479	1,439	1898
Egg Harbor	Door	201	358	1964
Eland	Shawano	202	199	1905
Elderon	Marathon	179	161	1917
Eleva	Trempealeau	670	685	1902
Elk Mound	Dunn	878	985	1909
Elkhart Lake	Sheboygan	967	941	1894
Ellsworth	Pierce	3,284	3,348	1887
Elm Grove	Waukesha	5,934	6,513	1955
Elmwood	Pierce	817	820	1905
Elmwood Park	Racine	497	510	1960
Embarrass	Waupaca	404	353	1895
Endeavor	Marquette	468	432	1946
Ephraim	Door	288	345	1919
Ettrick	Trempealeau	524	525	1948
Exeland	Sawyer	196	229	1920
Fairchild	Eau Claire	550	451	1880
Fairwater	Fond du Lac	371	346	1921
Fall Creek	Eau Claire	1,315	1,422	1906
Fall River	Columbia	1,712	1,801	1903
Fenwood	Marathon	152	141	1904
Ferryville	Crawford	176	191	1912
Fontana-on-Geneva Lake	Walworth	1,672	3,120	1924
Footville	Rock	808	772	1918
Forestville	Door	430	482	1960
Fox Crossing	Winnebago County	N/A	18,974	2016
Fox Point	Milwaukee	6,701	6,934	1926
Francis Creek	Manitowoc	669	659	1960
Frederic	Polk	1,137	1,154	1903
Fredonia	Ozaukee	2,160	2,279	1922
French Island	La Crosse	N/A	N/A	2026
Fremont	Waupaca	679	689	1882
Friendship	Adams	725	648	1907
Friesland	Columbia	356	320	1946
Gays Mills	Crawford	491	523	1900
Genoa	Vernon	252	232	1935
Genoa City	Kenosha; Walworth	3,042	2,982	1901
Germantown	Washington	19,749	20,917	1927
Gilman	Taylor	410	378	1914
Glen Flora	Rusk	92	100	1915
Glenbeulah	Sheboygan	463	451	1913
Grafton	Ozaukee	11,459	12,094	1896
Granton	Clark	355	381	1916
Grantsburg	Burnett	1,341	1,330	1887
Gratiot	Lafayette	236	224	1891
Greendale	Milwaukee	14,046	14,854	1939
Greenleaf	Brown	N/A	N/A	2024
Greenville	Outagamie	10,309	12,687	2021
Gresham	Shawano	586	530	1908
Hales Corners	Milwaukee	7,692	7,720	1952
Hammond	St. Croix	1,922	1,873	1880
Hancock	Waushara	417	393	1902
Harrison	Calumet	N/A	12,418	2013
Hartland	Waukesha	9,110	9,501	1891
Hatley	Marathon	574	648	1912
Haugen	Barron	287	266	1918
Hawkins	Rusk	305	331	1922
Hazel Green	Grant; Lafayette	1,256	1,173	1867
Hewitt	Wood	828	796	1973
Highland	Iowa	842	874	1873
Hilbert	Calumet	1,132	1,248	1898
Hixton	Jackson	433	456	1920
Hobart	Brown	6,182	10,211	2003
Hollandale	Iowa	288	306	1910
Holmen	La Crosse	9,005	10,661	1946
Hortonville	Outagamie	2,711	3,028	1894
Howard	Brown; Outagamie	17,399	19,950	1959
Howards Grove	Sheboygan	3,188	3,237	1967
Hustisford	Dodge	1,123	1,101	1870
Hustler	Juneau	194	162	1914
Ingram	Rusk	78	70	1907
Iola	Waupaca	1,301	1,249	1892
Iron Ridge	Dodge	929	904	1913
Ironton	Sauk	253	274	1914
Jackson	Washington	6,753	7,185	1912
Johnson Creek	Jefferson	2,738	3,318	1903
Junction City	Portage	439	420	1911
Kekoskee	Dodge	161	896	1958
Kellnersville	Manitowoc	332	307	1971
Kendall	Monroe	472	484	1894
Kennan	Price	135	143	1903
Kewaskum	Fond du Lac; Washington	4,004	4,309	1895
Kimberly	Outagamie	6,468	7,320	1910
Kingston	Green Lake	326	281	1923
Knapp	Dunn	463	478	1905
Kohler	Sheboygan	2,120	2,195	1912
Kronenwetter	Marathon	7,210	8,353	2002
La Farge	Vernon	746	730	1899
La Valle	Sauk	367	388	1883
Lac La Belle	Jefferson; Waukesha	290	281	1931
Lake Delton	Sauk	2,914	3,501	1954
Lake Hallie	Chippewa Eau Claire	6,448	7,170	2003
Lake Nebagamon	Douglas	1,069	1,123	1907
Lannon	Waukesha	1,107	1,355	1930
Lena	Oconto	564	537	1921
Lime Ridge	Sauk	162	158	1910
Linden	Iowa	549	504	1900
Lisbon	Waukesha	10,157	10,477	2023
Little Chute	Outagamie	10,449	11,619	1899
Livingston	Grant; Iowa	664	637	1914
Loganville	Sauk	300	301	1917
Lohrville	Waushara	402	434	1910
Lomira	Dodge	2,430	2,678	1899
Lone Rock	Richland	888	829	1886
Lowell	Dodge	340	309	1894
Lublin	Taylor	118	117	1915
Luck	Polk	1,119	1,093	1905
Luxemburg	Kewaunee	2,515	2,685	1908
Lyndon Station	Juneau	500	498	1903
Lynxville	Crawford	132	132	1899
Maiden Rock	Pierce	119	115	1887
Maine	Marathon	2,337	2,613	2015
Maple Bluff	Dane	1,313	1,368	1930
Marathon City	Marathon	1,524	1,576	1884
Maribel	Manitowoc	351	336	1963
Marquette	Green Lake	150	172	1958
Marshall	Dane	3,862	3,787	1905
Mason	Bayfield	93	101	1925
Mattoon	Shawano	438	357	1901
Mazomanie	Dane	1,652	1,768	1885
McFarland	Dane	7,808	8,991	1920
Melrose	Jackson	503	544	1914
Melvina	Monroe	87	93	1922
Menomonee Falls	Waukesha	35,626	38,527	1892
Merrillan	Jackson	542	562	1881
Merrimac	Sauk	420	527	1899
Merton	Waukesha	3,346	3,441	1922
Milladore	Portage; Wood	276	268	1933
Milltown	Polk	917	948	1910
Minong	Washburn	527	548	1915
Mishicot	Manitowoc	1,442	1,432	1950
Montfort	Grant; Iowa	718	705	1893
Monticello	Green	1,217	1,192	1891
Mount Calvary	Fond du Lac	762	548	1962
Mount Hope	Grant	225	215	1919
Mount Horeb	Dane	7,009	7,754	1899
Mount Pleasant	Racine	26,197	27,732	2003
Mount Sterling	Crawford	211	189	1936
Mukwonago	Walworth; Waukesha	7,355	8,262	1905
Muscoda	Grant; Iowa	1,299	1,307	1894
Nashotah	Waukesha	1,395	1,321	1957
Necedah	Juneau	916	924	1870
Nelson	Buffalo	374	322	1978
Nelsonville	Portage	155	158	1913
Neosho	Dodge	574	591	1902
Neshkoro	Marquette	434	412	1906
New Auburn	Barron; Chippewa	548	562	1902
New Glarus	Green	2,172	2,277	1901
Newburg	Ozaukee; Washington	1,254	1,142	1973
Nichols	Outagamie	273	290	1967
North Bay	Racine	241	209	1951
North Fond du Lac	Fond du Lac	5,014	5,378	1903
North Freedom	Sauk	701	603	1893
North Hudson	St. Croix	3,768	3,803	1912
North Prairie	Waukesha	2,141	2,202	1919
Norwalk	Monroe	638	611	1894
Oakdale	Monroe	402	302	1988
Oakfield	Fond du Lac	1,075	1,052	1903
Oconomowoc Lake	Waukesha	595	566	1959
Ogdensburg	Waupaca	185	188	1912
Oliver	Douglas	399	423	1917
Ontario	Vernon; Monroe	554	534	1890
Oostburg	Sheboygan	2,887	3,056	1909
Oregon	Dane	9,231	11,179	1883
Orfordville	Rock	1,442	1,473	1900
Osceola	Polk	2,568	2,765	1886
Oxford	Marquette	607	537	1912
Paddock Lake	Kenosha	2,992	2,919	1960
Palmyra	Jefferson	1,781	1,719	1866
Pardeeville	Columbia	2,115	2,074	1894
Park Ridge	Portage	491	530	1938
Patch Grove	Grant	198	201	1921
Pepin	Pepin	837	731	1860
Pewaukee	Waukesha	8,166	8,238	1876
Pigeon Falls	Trempealeau	411	381	1956
Plain	Sauk	773	749	1912
Plainfield	Waushara	897	924	1882
Pleasant Prairie	Kenosha	19,719	21,250	1989
Plover	Portage	12,123	13,519	1971
Plum City	Pierce	599	596	1909
Poplar	Douglas	603	629	1917
Port Edwards	Wood	1,818	1,762	1902
Potosi	Grant	688	813	1887
Potter	Calumet	253	244	1980
Pound	Marinette	377	357	1914
Poynette	Columbia	2,528	2,590	1892
Prairie du Sac	Sauk	3,972	4,420	1885
Prairie Farm	Barron	473	494	1901
Prentice	Price	660	563	1899
Pulaski	Brown; Shawano; Oconto	3,539	3,870	1910
Radisson	Sawyer	241	273	1953
Randolph	Columbia; Dodge	1,811	1,796	1870
Random Lake	Sheboygan	1,594	1,561	1907
Raymond	Racine	N/A	3,926	2019
Readstown	Vernon	415	376	1898
Redgranite	Waushara	2,149	2,061	1904
Reedsville	Manitowoc	1,206	1,195	1892
Reeseville	Dodge	708	763	1899
Rewey	Iowa	292	258	1902
Rib Lake	Taylor	910	935	1902
Rib Mountain	Marathon	N/A	7,346	2023
Richfield	Washington	11,300	11,739	2008
Ridgeland	Dunn	273	258	1921
Ridgeway	Iowa	653	624	1902
Rio	Columbia	1,059	1,119	1887
River Hills	Milwaukee	1,597	1,602	1930
Roberts	St. Croix	1,651	1,919	1945
Rochester	Racine	3,682	3,785	1912
Rock Springs	Sauk	362	327	1894
Rockdale	Dane	214	207	1914
Rockland	La Crosse; Monroe	594	765	1919
Rosendale	Fond du Lac	1,063	1,039	1915
Rosholt	Portage	506	478	1907
Rothschild	Marathon	5,269	5,567	1917
Rudolph	Wood	439	433	1960
St. Cloud	Fond du Lac	477	489	1909
St. Nazianz	Manitowoc	783	714	1956
Salem Lakes	Kenosha	14,520	14,601	2017
Sauk City	Sauk	3,410	3,518	1854
Saukville	Ozaukee	4,451	4,258	1915
Scandinavia	Waupaca	328	371	1894
Sharon	Walworth	1,605	1,586	1892
Sheldon	Rusk	237	261	1917
Sherwood	Calumet	2,713	3,270	1968
Shiocton	Outagamie	921	939	1903
Shorewood	Milwaukee	13,162	13,859	1900
Shorewood Hills	Dane	1,565	2,169	1927
Siren	Burnett	806	824	1948
Sister Bay	Door	876	1,148	1912
Slinger	Washington	5,068	5,992	1869
Soldiers Grove	Crawford	592	552	1888
Solon Springs	Douglas	600	656	1920
Somers	Kenosha	N/A	8,402	2015
Somerset	St. Croix	2,635	3,019	1915
South Wayne	Lafayette	489	446	1911
Spencer	Marathon	1,925	1,818	1902
Spring Green	Sauk	1,628	1,566	1869
Spring Valley	Pierce; St. Croix	1,352	1,401	1895
Star Prairie	St. Croix	561	678	1900
Stetsonville	Taylor	541	563	1949
Steuben	Crawford	131	122	1900
Stockbridge	Calumet	636	678	1908
Stockholm	Pepin	66	78	1903
Stoddard	Vernon	774	840	1911
Stratford	Marathon	1,578	1,581	1910
Strum	Trempealeau	1,114	1,076	1948
Sturtevant	Racine	6,970	6,919	1907
Suamico	Brown	11,346	12,820	2003
Sullivan	Jefferson	669	651	1915
Summit	Waukesha	N/A	4,784	2010
Superior	Douglas	664	677	1949
Suring	Oconto	544	517	1914
Sussex	Waukesha	10,518	11,487	1924
Taylor	Jackson	476	484	1919
Tennyson	Grant	355	348	1940
Theresa	Dodge	1,262	1,255	1898
Thiensville	Ozaukee	3,235	3,290	1910
Tigerton	Shawano	741	708	1896
Tony	Rusk	113	105	1911
Trempealeau	Trempealeau	1,529	1,843	1867
Turtle Lake	Barron; Polk	1,050	1,037	1898
Twin Lakes	Kenosha	5,989	6,309	1937
Union Center	Juneau	200	225	1913
Union Grove	Racine	4,915	4,806	1893
Unity	Clark; Marathon	343	384	1903
Valders	Manitowoc	962	952	1919
Vernon	Waukesha	N/A	7,474	2020
Vesper	Wood	584	513	1948
Viola	Richland; Vernon	699	676	1899
Waldo	Sheboygan	503	467	1922
Wales	Waukesha	2,549	2,862	1922
Walworth	Walworth	2,816	2,759	1901
Warrens	Monroe	363	544	1973
Waterford	Racine	5,368	5,542	1906
Waukesha	Waukesha	9,133	8,457	2020
Waunakee	Dane	12,097	14,879	1893
Wausaukee	Marinette	575	596	1924
Wauzeka	Crawford	711	628	1890
Webster	Burnett	653	694	1916
West Baraboo	Sauk	1,414	1,627	1956
West Milwaukee	Milwaukee	4,206	4,114	1906
West Salem	La Crosse	4,799	5,277	1893
Westfield	Marquette	1,254	1,302	1902
Weston	Marathon	14,868	15,723	1996
Weyerhaeuser	Rusk	238	232	1906
Wheeler	Dunn	348	326	1922
White Lake	Langlade	363	262	1926
Whitefish Bay	Milwaukee	14,110	14,954	1892
Whitelaw	Manitowoc	757	737	1958
Whiting	Portage	1,724	1,601	1947
Wild Rose	Waushara	725	780	1904
Williams Bay	Walworth	2,564	2,953	1919
Wilson	St. Croix	184	209	1911
Wilton	Monroe	504	532	1890
Wind Point	Racine	1,723	1,651	1954
Windsor	Dane	N/A	8,754	2015
Winneconne	Winnebago	2,383	2,544	1887
Winter	Sawyer	313	325	1973
Withee	Clark	487	506	1901
Wittenberg	Shawano	1,081	1,015	1893
Wonewoc	Juneau	816	758	1878
Woodman	Grant	132	118	1917
Woodville	St. Croix	1,344	1,386	1911
Wrightstown	Brown; Outagamie	2,827	3,179	1901
Wyeville	Monroe	147	121	1923
Wyocena	Columbia	768	756	1909
Yorkville	Racine	N/A	3,246	2018
Yuba	Richland	74	53	1935

== See also ==
- List of cities in Wisconsin
- List of municipalities in Wisconsin by population
- List of towns in Wisconsin
- Political subdivisions of Wisconsin
