= Central State Conference =

Wisconsin high school athletic conference (1962-1984)

The Central State Conference is a former high school athletic conference in central Wisconsin, in operation from 1962 to 1984. Its member schools were affiliated with the Wisconsin Interscholastic Athletic Association.

== History ==
=== 1962–1970 ===
Location of Original Central-C Conference Members

The Central State Conference, originally known as the Central-C Conference, was formed in 1962 by eight small- to medium-sized public high schools and one private Catholic high school in central Wisconsin. Five schools were former members of the Central Lakes Conference (Almond, Necedah, Oxford, Port Edwards and Wild Rose), three belonged to the 7-C Conference (Adams-Friendship, Tri-County and Westfield) and one formerly competed as an independent (Madonna). Almost immediately, the conference began to lose members to rural school district consolidation and closings. The first such change occurred in 1963, when Oxford was closed and its students were redistricted to Westfield. In 1966, conference membership was cut in half due to the closing of Madonna High School and the defection of three schools (Adams-Friendship, Tri-County and Westfield) to the newly formed Vacationland Conference. Amherst and Iola-Scandinavia joined as football-only members from the Central Wisconsin Conference the next year to bring the football roster to five schools. In 1968, Bowler joined the conference from the Wolf River Valley Conference as a football-only member, and the loop changed its name to the Central State Conference. Rosholt and Tigerton joined the football alignment the next year, and the conference had eight football-playing members.

=== 1970–1984 ===
Location of Final Central State Conference Members

In 1970, the Central State Conference underwent a significant expansion with six schools becoming full members. All five football-only members became full members of the conference: three from the shuttered Wolf River Valley Conference (Bowler, Rosholt and Tigerton) and two from the Central Wisconsin Conference (Amherst and Iola-Scandinavia). Tri-County, making their return after the dissolution of the Vacationland Conference, rounded out the expanded group. Granton and Gresham would join the Central State Conference in 1972; Granton was previously in the Marawood Conference and Gresham competed as an independent for two years after the collapse of the Wolf River Valley Conference. Granton's stay would be brief, as they would return to the Marawood Conference in 1976. Shiocton moved over from the Central Wisconsin Conference in 1977 to take their place, and Necedah left to become a charter member of the Scenic Bluffs Conference in 1979. They were replaced by Menominee Indian High School, who acquired their first ever conference affiliation after opening a few years earlier. The Central State Conference merged with the Central Wisconsin Conference in 1984, taking the more established conference's name in the process.

== Conference membership history ==
=== Final members ===
School	Location	Affiliation	Mascot	Colors	Joined	Left	Conference Joined	Current Conference
Almond-Bancroft	Almond, WI	Public	Eagles		1962	1984	Central Wisconsin	
Amherst	Amherst, WI	Public	Falcons		1970	1984	Central Wisconsin	
Bowler	Bowler, WI	Public	Panthers		1970	1984	Central Wisconsin	
Gresham	Gresham, WI	Public	Wildcats		1972	1984	Central Wisconsin	
Iola-Scandinavia	Iola, WI	Public	Thunderbirds		1970	1984	Central Wisconsin	
Menominee Nation	Kesīqnaeh, WI	Federal (Tribal)	Eagles		1979	1984	Central Wisconsin	
Port Edwards	Port Edwards, WI	Public	Blackhawks		1962	1984	Central Wisconsin	
Rosholt	Rosholt, WI	Public	Hornets		1970	1984	Central Wisconsin	
Shiocton	Shiocton, WI	Public	Chiefs		1977	1984	Central Wisconsin	
Tigerton	Tigerton, WI	Public	Tigers		1970	1984	Central Wisconsin	
Tri-County	Plainfield, WI	Public	Penguins		1962, 1970	1966, 1984	Vacationland, Central Wisconsin	Central Wisconsin
Wild Rose	Wild Rose, WI	Public	Wildcats		1962	1984	Central Wisconsin	

=== Previous members ===
School	Location	Affiliation	Mascot	Colors	Joined	Left	Conference Joined	Current Conference
Adams-Friendship	Adams, WI	Public	Green Devils		1962	1966	Vacationland	South Central
Granton	Granton, WI	Public	Bulldogs		1972	1976	Marawood	Cloverbelt
Madonna	Mauston, WI	Private (Catholic)	Cowboys		1962	1966	Closed	
Necedah	Necedah, WI	Public	Cardinals		1962	1979	Scenic Bluffs	
Oxford	Oxford, WI	Public	Bluejays		1962	1963	Closed (consolidated with Westfield)	
Westfield	Westfield, WI	Public	Pioneers		1962	1966	Vacationland	South Central

=== Football-only members ===
School	Location	Affiliation	Mascot	Colors	Seasons	Primary Conference
Amherst	Amherst, WI	Public	Falcons		1967-1969	Central Wisconsin
Iola-Scandinavia	Iola, WI	Public	Thunderbirds		1967-1969	Central Wisconsin
Bowler	Bowler, WI	Public	Panthers		1968-1969	Wolf River Valley
Rosholt	Rosholt, WI	Public	Hornets		1969	Wolf River Valley
Tigerton	Tigerton, WI	Public	Tigers		1969	Wolf River Valley

== List of state champions ==
=== Fall sports ===
None

=== Winter sports ===
Girls Basketball
School	Year	Division
Iola-Scandinavia	1978	Class C

=== Spring sports ===
Girls Track & Field
School	Year	Division
Wild Rose	1978	Class C
Wild Rose	1979	Class C

== List of conference champions ==
=== Boys Basketball ===
School	Quantity	Years
Port Edwards	8	1967, 1968, 1969, 1970, 1971, 1973, 1978, 1979
Iola-Scandinavia	5	1972, 1977, 1982, 1983, 1984
Almond-Bancroft	2	1967, 1980
Necedah	2	1974, 1977
Westfield	2	1964, 1966
Adams-Friendship	1	1965
Amherst	1	1981
Granton	1	1975
Gresham	1	1977
Madonna	1	1963
Wild Rose	1	1976
Bowler	0	
Menominee Nation	0	
Oxford	0	
Rosholt	0	
Shiocton	0	
Tigerton	0	
Tri-County	0	

=== Girls Basketball ===
School	Quantity	Years
Iola-Scandinavia	6	1974, 1975, 1976, 1977, 1982, 1983
Almond-Bancroft	5	1979, 1980, 1981, 1983, 1984
Port Edwards	1	1978
Tri-County	1	1980
Amherst	0	
Bowler	0	
Granton	0	
Gresham	0	
Menominee Nation	0	
Necedah	0	
Rosholt	0	
Shiocton	0	
Tigerton	0	
Wild Rose	0	

=== Football ===
School	Quantity	Years
Port Edwards	10	1962, 1966, 1967, 1968, 1969, 1970, 1971, 1972, 1982, 1983
Iola-Scandinavia	4	1967, 1974, 1975, 1978
Shiocton	4	1979, 1980, 1981, 1983
Wild Rose	4	1967, 1974, 1976, 1977
Westfield	3	1963, 1964, 1965
Rosholt	2	1977, 1981
Tri-County	2	1973, 1981
Amherst	1	1977
Madonna	1	1963
Adams-Friendship	0	
Almond-Bancroft	0	
Bowler	0	
Necedah	0	
Tigerton	0	
