= Amherst Telephone Company =

Telecommunication company in the US

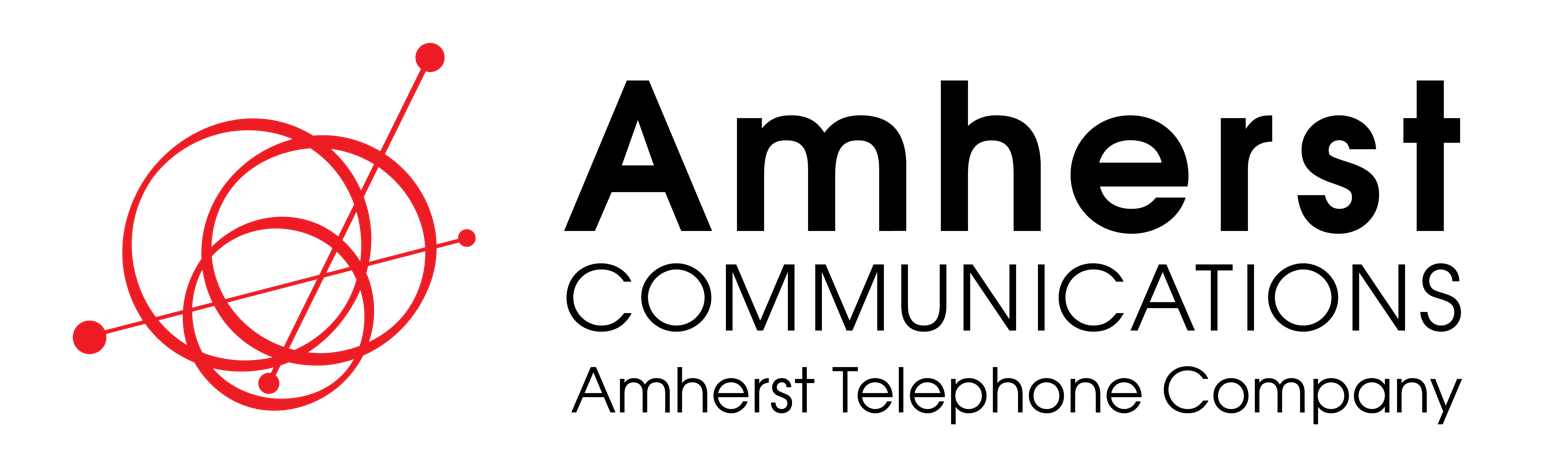

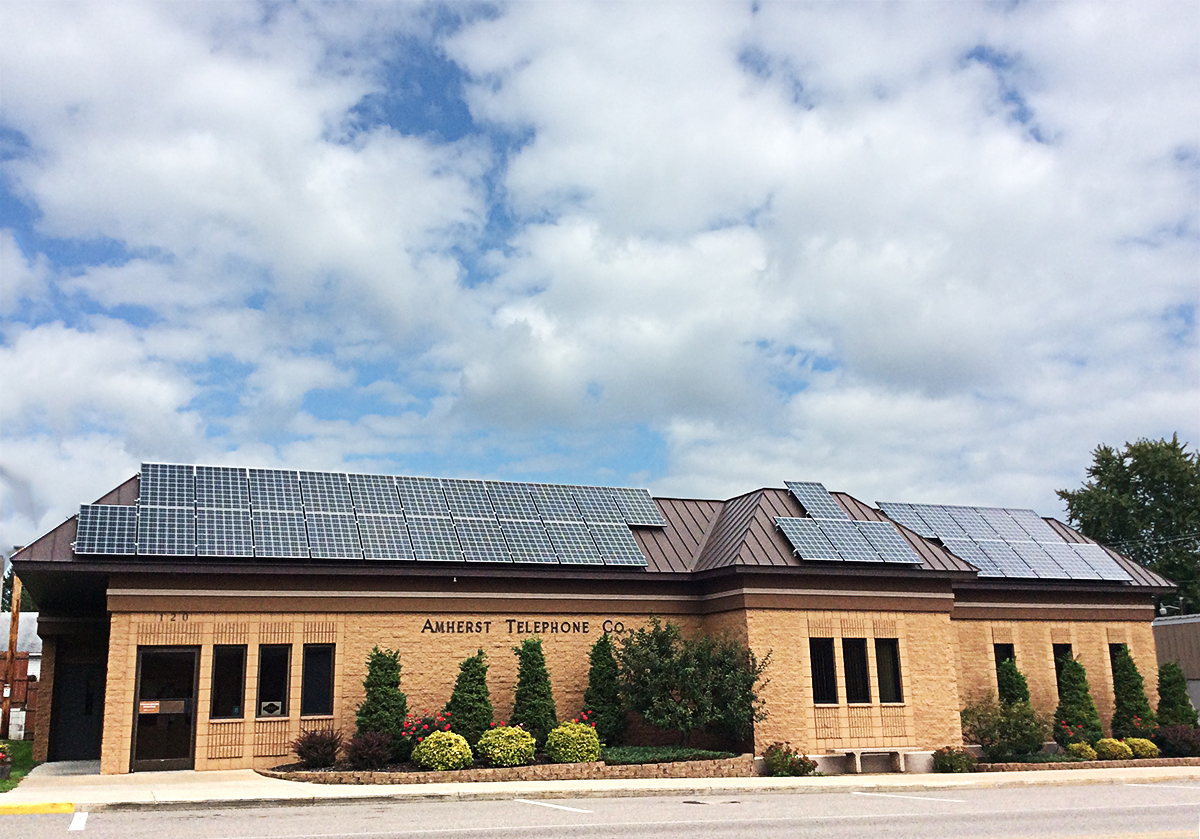
- The main office in Amherst
- Industry: Telecommunications
- Founded: 1903 (123 years ago) in Amherst, Wisconsin, Wisconsin, United States
- Products: Fiber-optic communication HDTV; Internet service provider Telephone
- Website: www.wi-net.com

Amherst Telephone Company, also known as Amherst Communications, is a provider of Internet, telephone and television in Portage County, Wisconsin, United States and neighboring areas.

== History ==
Amherst Telephone Company was incorporated on July 3, 1903. Capital to form the new company was provided by 62 area residents who pledged $25 each to buy a share of stock. C. J. Iverson was selected as the first president.

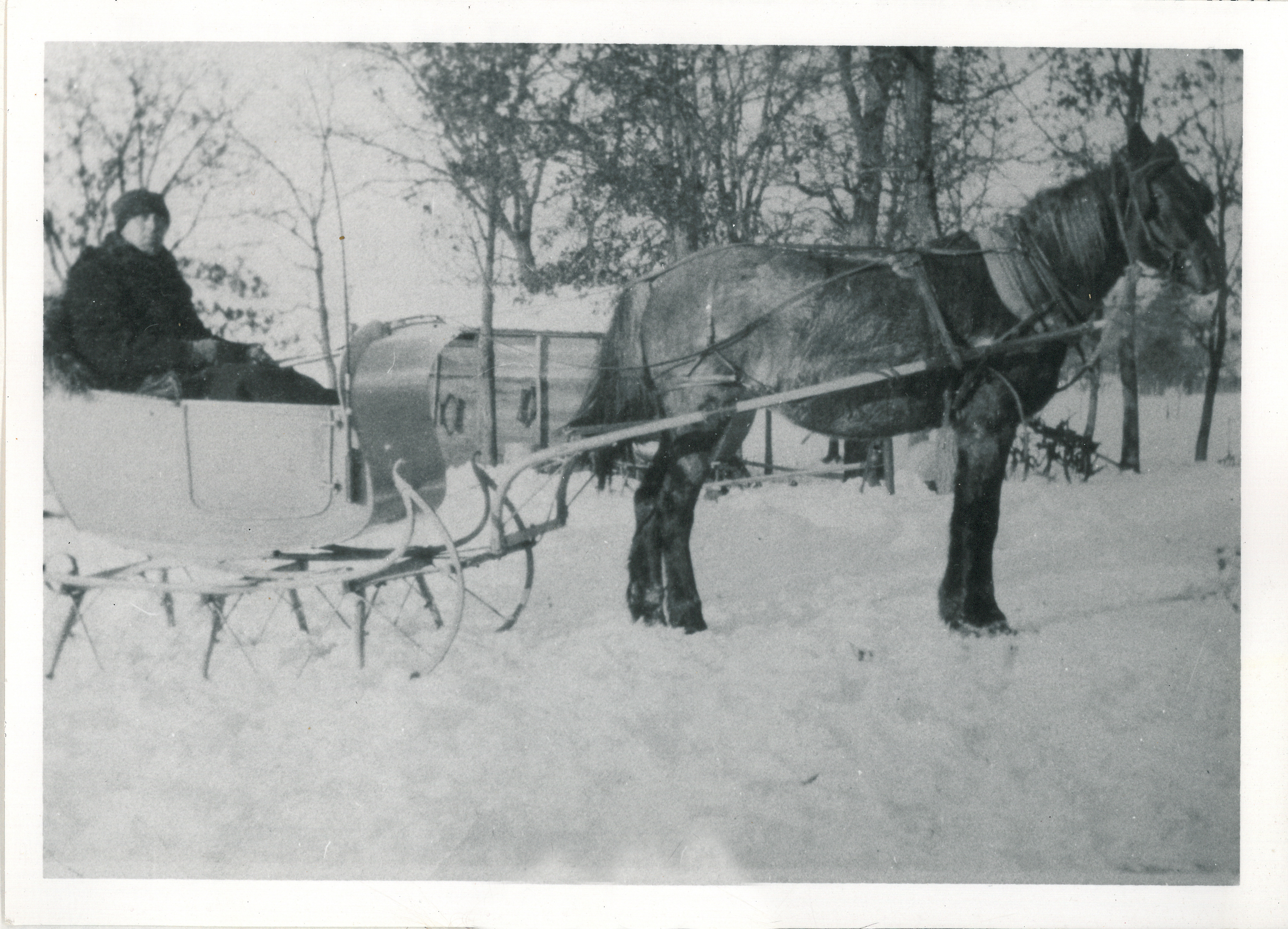
May, unknown date

An old gray mare, named May, was a pioneer partner of the Amherst Telephone Company. May transported poles, materials and linesmen from 1903 though 1929. She was known to the whole community, and many local youths had fun riding her carriage to social gatherings. A car was hired to help her in 1920, but she was often still needed due to the poor roads, which were piled high with snow in the winter.

=== Important dates ===
In 1907, A connection was made with the Bell System.

In 1908, 90.5 miles (145.6 km) of line were laid, 233 telephones distributed and 200 shares bought. The line was built to Custer and Polonia, and a switchboard was installed in the Lukasavitz home.

In 1925, Amherst Telephone purchased the Nelsonville and Rosholt exchanges with 400 subscribers. This merger almost doubled the number of telephones in the network.

In 1930, The Great Depression arrived. During the coming years the company lost half of its subscribers due in large part to economic hardships.

In 1935, The Custer exchange closed.

In 1955, a new building was constructed for the automatic switchboard that was purchased for Rosholt.

In 1957, C. O. Iverson died, and C. O. Iverson, Jr. joined the workforce. There were 1,000 subscribers by the end of the decade.

In the 1960s, New buildings were constructed in Amherst, Polonia and Nelsonville. New dial switchboards were purchased for Amherst, Rosholt, Polonia and Nelsonville.

In the 1980s, the Nelsonville exchange was eliminated, and new additions were added to the Amherst building. A new cable television was formed. By mid-decade, there were around 3,000 access lines, 90% of which were buried.

In 1999, Fire hit the main Amherst Telephone office in Amherst. The disaster knocked out only 20% of customers due to a backup system.

In 2018, Amherst Telephone Company now called Amherst Communications continues to expand its Fiber to Home service in neighboring communities, adding hundreds of homes to the service area every year through expansion into the under-served countryside.

=== Improvements ===
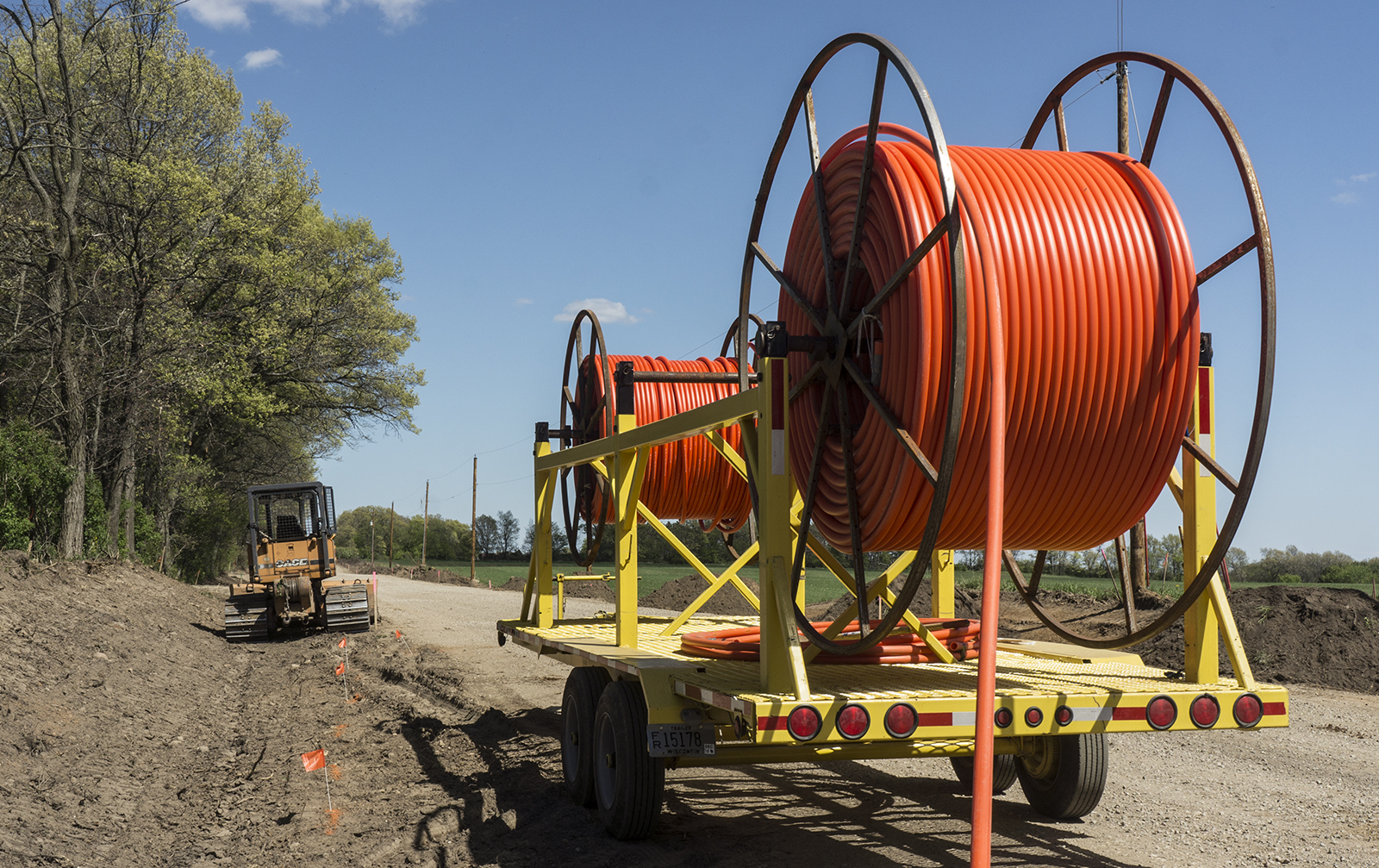

Amherst Communications has made improvements to their network. They have buried their lines for less storm damage and more reliability. They have grown from party lines to private service, analog service to digital service and upgraded from copper wire to fiber-optic cable.

They partner with WIN (Wisconsin Independent Network), the largest Wisconsin-based fiber optic transport network in the state.

Additional partners include:

Airstream and Midwest Video Solutions, help provide for high bandwidth, high speed video and data capabilities.
