= Wolf River Valley Conference =

Wisconsin high school athletic conference (1932-1970)

The Wolf River Valley Conference is a former high school athletic conference in Wisconsin, with its membership concentrated in the north central part of the state. Founded in 1932 and dissolved in 1970, its member schools belonged to the Wisconsin Interscholastic Athletic Association.

== History ==
=== 1932–1957 ===
Location of Original Wolf River Valley Conference Members

The Wolf River Valley Conference was formed in 1932 from a split of four schools from the Central Wisconsin Conference. Birnamwood, Rosholt, Tigerton and Wittenberg were all members of the conference's Northern Section and were joined by Mattoon to form a five-member circuit. Four out of the five original members were located in Shawano County, with one (Rosholt) based in Portage County. By the end of the 1930s that number had increased to eight schools as Scandinavia joined in 1934 and two schools (Bowler and Gresham) entered the conference in 1939. The Wolf River Valley Conference would compete with this membership roster for just over a decade before Wittenberg left to compete as an independent in 1948, leaving the conference with seven members. White Lake would join from the Northern Lakes Conference in 1957, bringing membership back up to eight schools.

=== 1957–1970 ===
Location of Final Wolf River Valley Conference Members

In the 1960s, rural school district consolidation began to take its toll on Wolf River Valley Conference membership. The first to leave the conference was Scandinavia in 1960 after their merger with Iola of the Central Wisconsin Conference. Mattoon followed them out in 1962 as their district was consolidated into Antigo of the Wisconsin Valley Conference. Bear Creek would join in 1965 after their exit from the Little Nine Conference, but their stay was short-lived as the district was folded into Clintonville of the Mid-Eastern Conference in 1969. The Wolf River Valley Conference was disbanded in 1970, with Bowler, Rosholt and Tigerton becoming members of the Central State Conference. Gresham and White Lake became independents, and both joined conferences in 1972 (Gresham to the Central State, White Lake to the Northern Lakes). Birnamwood was merged with Wittenberg in 1970, and the new Wittenberg-Birnamwood High School inherited Wittenberg's place in the Central Wisconsin Conference.

== Conference membership history ==
=== Final members ===
School	Location	Affiliation	Mascot	Colors	Joined	Left	Conference Joined	Current Conference
Birnamwood	Birnamwood, WI	Public	Orioles		1932	1970	Closed (merged into Wittenberg-Birnamwood)	
Bowler	Bowler, WI	Public	Panthers		1939	1970	Central State	Central Wisconsin
Gresham	Gresham, WI	Public	Wildcats		1939	1970	Independent	Central Wisconsin
Rosholt	Rosholt, WI	Public	Hornets		1932	1970	Central State	Central Wisconsin
Tigerton	Tigerton, WI	Public	Tigers		1932	1970	Central State	Central Wisconsin
White Lake	White Lake, WI	Public	Lakers		1957	1970	Independent	Central Wisconsin

=== Previous members ===
School	Location	Affiliation	Mascot	Colors	Joined	Left	Conference Joined	Current Conference
Bear Creek	Bear Creek, WI	Public	Bruins		1965	1969	Closed (consolidated into Clintonville)	
Mattoon	Mattoon, WI	Public	Cardinals		1932	1962	Closed (consolidated into Antigo)	
Scandinavia	Scandinavia, WI	Public	Vikings		1934	1960	Closed (merged into Iola-Scandinavia)	
Wittenberg	Wittenberg, WI	Public	Wildcats		1932	1948	Independent	Closed (merged into Wittenberg-Birnamwood)

== List of conference champions ==
=== Boys Basketball ===
School	Quantity	Years
Birnamwood	8	1936, 1938, 1942, 1952, 1953, 1956, 1958, 1961
Tigerton	8	1933, 1934, 1937, 1943, 1950, 1959, 1969, 1970
Gresham	5	1960, 1961, 1964, 1965, 1966
Wittenberg	5	1944, 1945, 1946, 1947, 1948
Mattoon	4	1937, 1938, 1955, 1957
Bowler	3	1954, 1962, 1963
Rosholt	3	1935, 1951, 1968
Bear Creek	1	1967
Scandinavia	0	
White Lake	0	
Champions from 1939-1941 and 1949 unknown
