= Tomorrow/Waupaca River =

River in the U.S. state of Wisconsin

Coordinates: 44°18′20″N 88°52′52″W

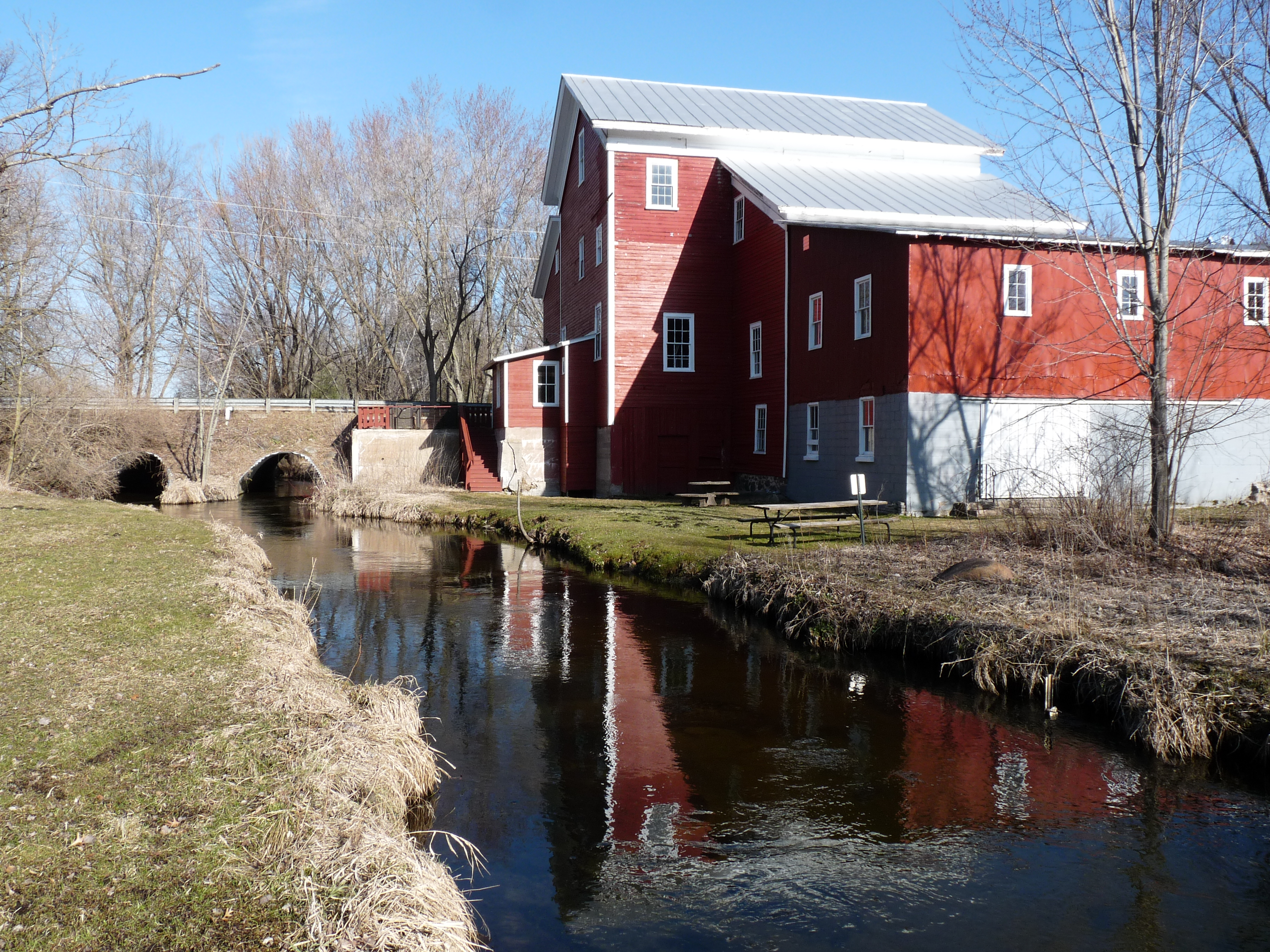
Flowing past the Rising Star Flouring Mill in Nelsonville, in March

The Tomorrow/Waupaca River is a river that flows wholly within the U.S. state of Wisconsin. It is called the Tomorrow River where it rises between Polonia and Rosholt in northeast Portage County; it flows through Nelsonville and Amherst. As it exits the village of Amherst, the Tomorrow enters the Town of Amherst, where it joins Bear Creek to become the Waupaca River. It flows into Waupaca County and through the city of Waupaca. There it adjoins the Crystal River and enters Weyauwega before converging with the Wolf River in eastern Waupaca County.

The Waupaca River is 44.8 miles (72.1 km) long, and the Tomorrow River is 22.1 miles (35.6 km) long.

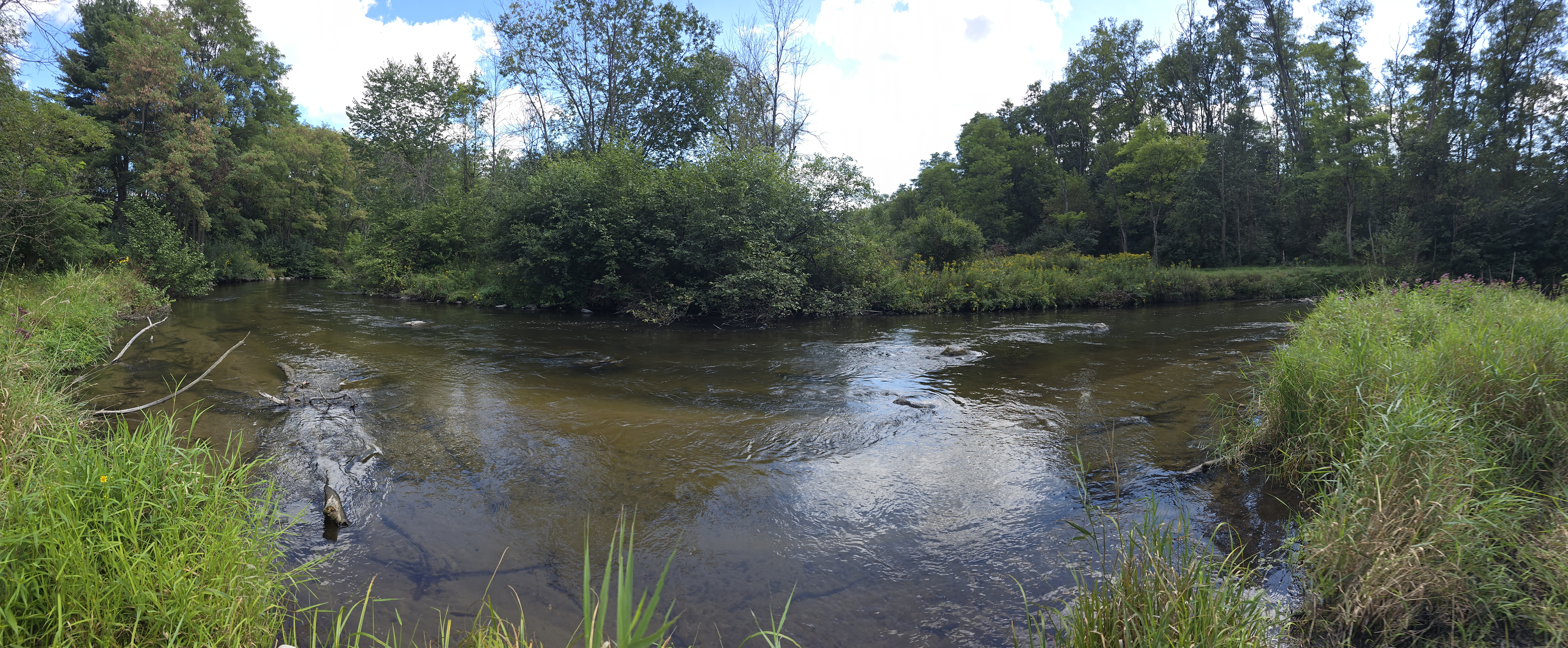
Access from the Ice Age Trail at Cobb Town

== Name origin ==
The river was named as the Waupaca by the Native Americans inhabiting the area, Waupaca being the Native American word for "tomorrow". The Native Americans needed 24 hours to travel its full length, so they would not reach the end until the following day, always "tomorrow". It is unknown why later settlers renamed the first portion of the river in English, as the Tomorrow River, before it reaches Bear Creek. The Wisconsin Department of Natural Resources recognizes the river as the "Tomorrow/Waupaca River".
