= Stetsonville, Wisconsin =

- Village
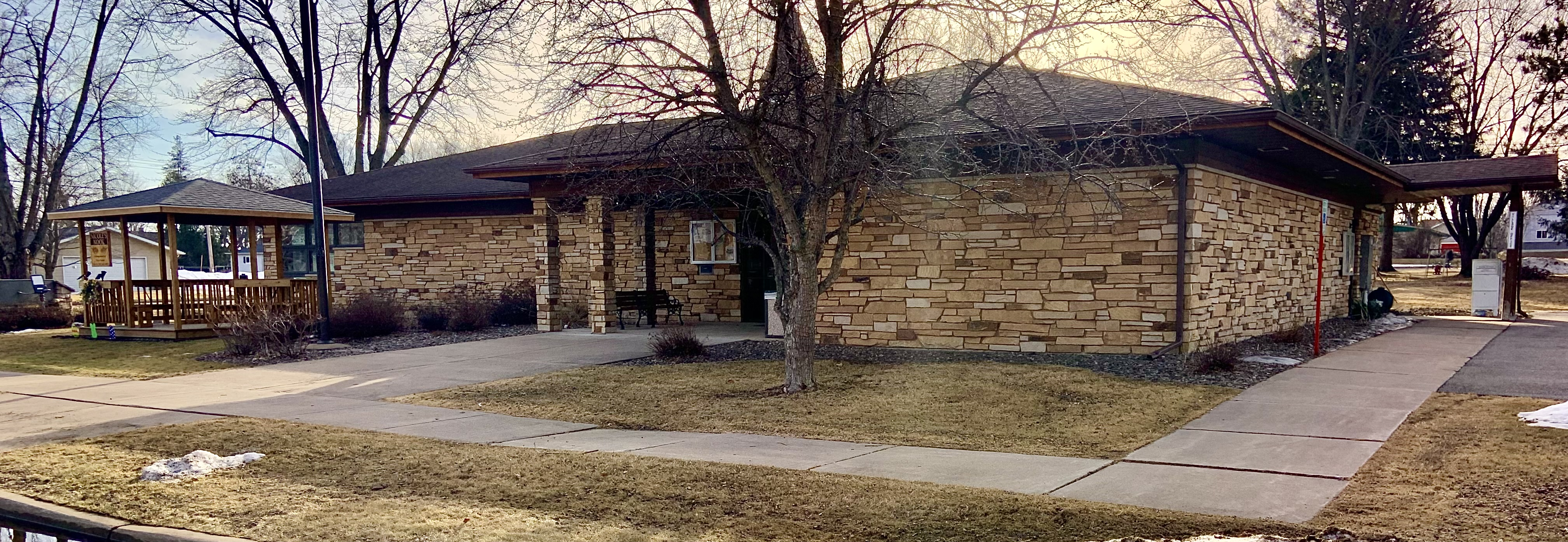
- Village hall

- Location of Stetsonville in Taylor County, Wisconsin.
- Coordinates: 45°4′35″N 90°18′50″W
- Country: United States
- State: Wisconsin
- County: Taylor

Area
  - Total: 0.39 sq mi (1.01 km^{2})
  - Land: 0.39 sq mi (1.01 km^{2})
  - Water: 0 sq mi (0.00 km^{2})
- Elevation: 1,453 ft (443 m)

Population (2020)
  - Total: 563
  - Density: 1,440/sq mi (557/km^{2})
- Time zone: UTC-6 (Central (CST))
  - Summer (DST): UTC-5 (CDT)
- Area codes: 715 & 534
- FIPS code: 55-77100
- GNIS feature ID: 1574869
- Website: https://villageofstetsonvillewi.gov/

Stetsonville is a village in Taylor County, Wisconsin, United States. The population was 563 at the 2020 census.

== History ==
Stetsonville began when the Wisconsin Central Railway built its line through the area in 1872, heading north for Ashland. The stop was initially called "63." In 1875 Isiah Stetson built the first sawmill in town. The town was later named after him.

The people of Stetsonville drew water from private wells until the 1980s, when petroleum contamination began to appear in some of them. A complete cleanup of the source was impossible, so in 2010 the village established a municipal water system, with help from the DNR, the USDA, the American Recovery and Reinvestment Act, and other sources.

== Geography ==
According to the United States Census Bureau, the village has a total area of 0.37 square miles (0.96 km^{2}), all land.

== Demographics ==
Historical population
Census	Pop.	Note	%±
1950	334		—
1960	319		−4.5%
1970	305		−4.4%
1980	487		59.7%
1990	511		4.9%
2000	563		10.2%
2010	541		−3.9%
2020	563		4.1%
U.S. Decennial Census

=== 2010 census ===
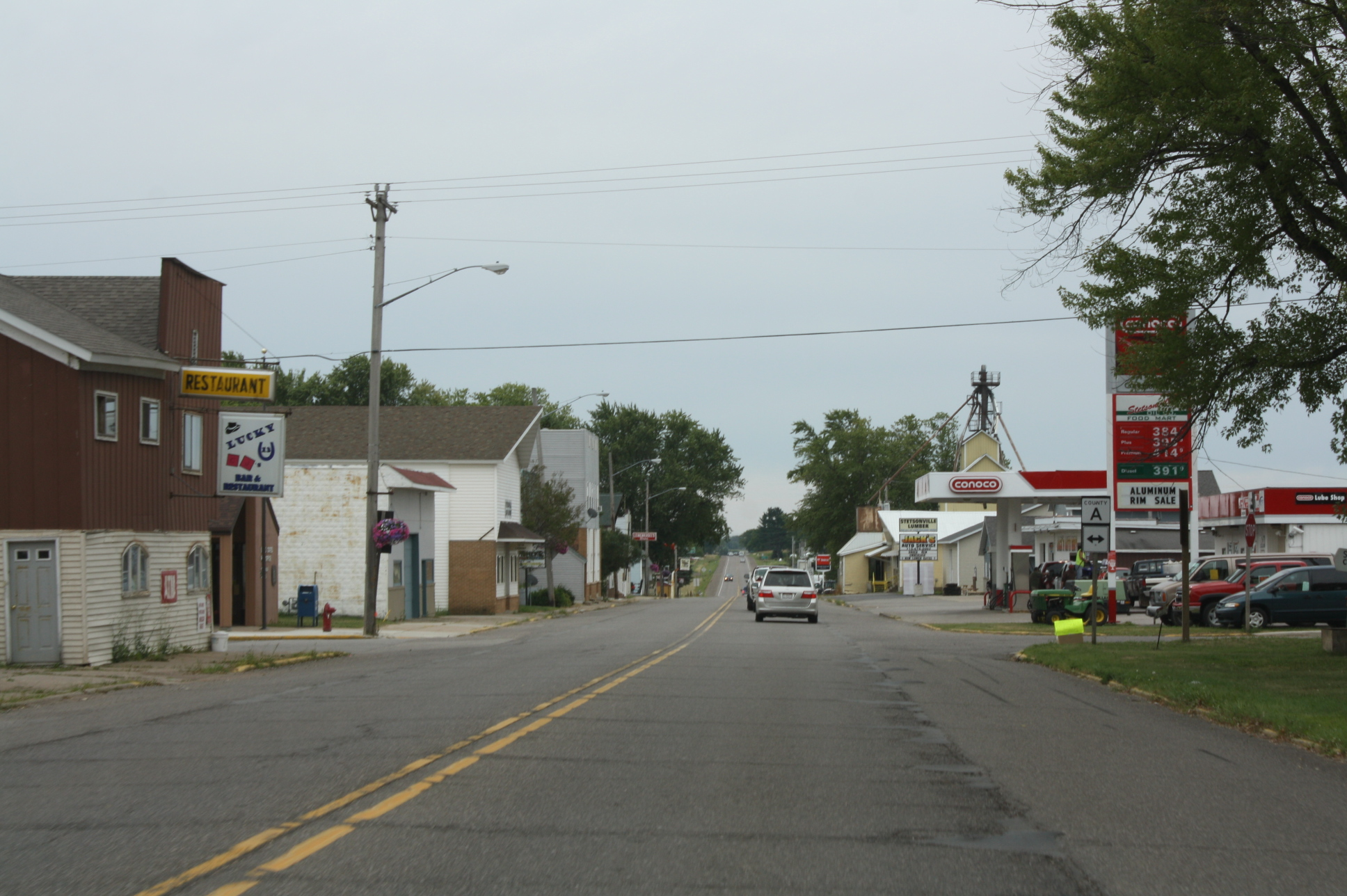
Looking south at downtown Stetsonville on WIS-13

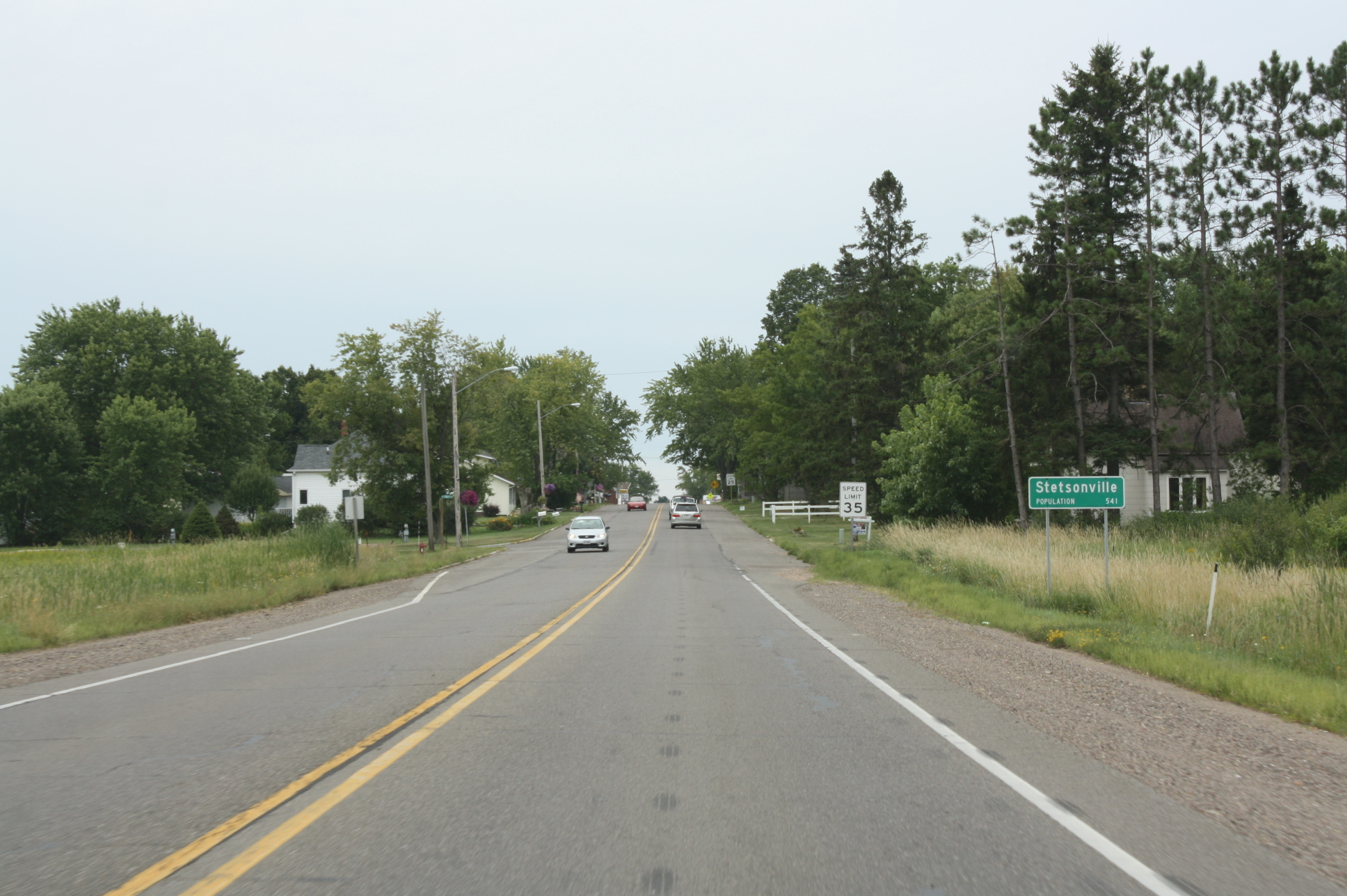
Stetsonville sign on Wisconsin Highway 13

As of the census of 2010, there were 541 people, 242 households, and 156 families living in the village. The population density was 1,462.2 inhabitants per square mile (564.6/km^{2}). There were 263 housing units at an average density of 710.8 per square mile (274.4/km^{2}). The racial makeup of the village was 98.5% White, 0.7% African American, 0.2% Asian, and 0.6% from two or more races. Hispanic or Latino of any race were 1.1% of the population.

There were 242 households, of which 30.6% had children under the age of 18 living with them, 47.5% were married couples living together, 11.6% had a female householder with no husband present, 5.4% had a male householder with no wife present, and 35.5% were non-families. 31.8% of all households were made up of individuals, and 14.8% had someone living alone who was 65 years of age or older. The average household size was 2.24 and the average family size was 2.76.

The median age in the village was 40 years. 23.7% of residents were under the age of 18; 8.3% were between the ages of 18 and 24; 27.2% were from 25 to 44; 23.8% were from 45 to 64; and 17% were 65 years of age or older. The gender makeup of the village was 49.0% male and 51.0% female.

=== 2000 census ===
As of the census of 2000, there were 563 people, 230 households, and 158 families living in the village. The population density was 1,533.0 people per square mile (587.5/km^{2}). There were 241 housing units at an average density of 656.2 per square mile (251.5/km^{2}). The racial makeup of the village was 98.76% White, 0.18% Asian, 0.18% from other races, and 0.89% from two or more races. Hispanic or Latino of any race were 0.71% of the population.

There were 230 households, out of which 35.2% had children under the age of 18 living with them, 57.8% were married couples living together, 7.8% had a female householder with no husband present, and 31.3% were non-families. 29.1% of all households were made up of individuals, and 14.3% had someone living alone who was 65 years of age or older. The average household size was 2.45 and the average family size was 3.04.

In the village, the population was spread out, with 28.2% under the age of 18, 7.3% from 18 to 24, 29.7% from 25 to 44, 19.0% from 45 to 64, and 15.8% who were 65 years of age or older. The median age was 35 years. For every 100 females, there were 89.6 males. For every 100 females age 18 and over, there were 87.9 males.

The median income for a household in the village was $32,045, and the median income for a family was $40,938. Males had a median income of $31,563 versus $23,875 for females. The per capita income for the village was $15,531. About 3.2% of families and 4.4% of the population were below the poverty line, including 5.8% of those under age 18 and 9.9% of those age 65 or over.

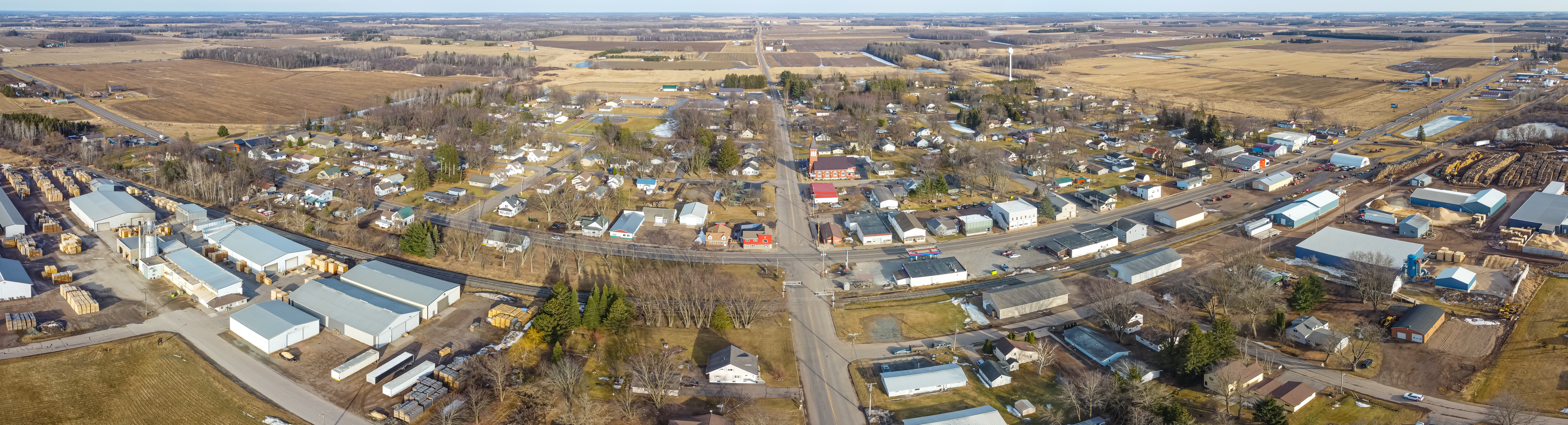
Stetsonville

== See also ==
- List of villages in Wisconsin
