= Charles F. Hanke =

American politician

Charles F. Hanke (September 26, 1853 – July 28, 1903) was a member of the Wisconsin State Assembly.

== Biography ==
Hanke was born on September 26, 1853. He moved to Amherst, Wisconsin in 1868 before settling in Augusta, Wisconsin.

== Career ==
Hanke was a member of the Assembly during the 1893 and 1895 sessions, but lost to Horace N. Polley as a candidate for the 1896 election. In addition, he was a member of the Augusta city council in 1888 and 1889 and chaired the Eau Claire County, Wisconsin board of supervisors in 1890, 1891 and 1892. He was a Republican.
