= Central Lakes Conference =

Wisconsin high school athletic conference (1951-1962)

The Central Lakes Conference is a former high school athletic conference in central Wisconsin. Founded in 1951 and dissolved in 1962, the conference and its member schools were affiliated with the Wisconsin Interscholastic Athletic Association.

== History ==
Location of Original Central Lakes Conference Members

The Central Lakes Conference was formed in 1951 by five schools who seceded from the larger 7-C Conference in central Wisconsin: Almond, Green Lake, Oxford-Endeavor, Princeton and Wild Rose. Eight-man football was first sponsored for the 1953 season with all five members participating. Princeton exited the conference in 1954 to join the Dual County Conference, bringing membership down to four schools. Endeavor and Oxford also ended their academic and athletic partnership that year, with Endeavor's school district area being reassigned to Portage. Green Lake dropped out of the Central Lakes Conference’s football roster for the 1955 and competed as an independent before rejoining in 1956. That same year, Necedah's entry into the conference from the Juneau County League brought the roster back up to five members, though they did not sponsor football. A sixth school was added in 1958 when Port Edwards left the 7-C Conference for Central Lakes Conference membership. They were the only member of the conference that competed in eleven-man football, which made them ineligible for the conference championship (though the league relented on this at the end of the season). Port Edward’s left as football members for the 1959 season to compete against other 11-man programs and were replaced by Montello of the 7-C Conference after they switched to eight-man football. Green Lake joined the Fox Valley Tri-County League in 1959, leaving the Central Lakes Conference with five members. After the 1960-61 school year, Montello left for full membership in the Dual County Conference, and Port Edwards rejoined for football in 1961 after transitioning to eight-man football. The Central Lakes Conference was dissolved in 1962, and the five remaining members of the conference joined with three former members of the 7-C Conference (Adams-Friendship, Tri-County and Westfield) and Madonna High School in Mauston to form the new Central-C Conference.

== Conference membership history ==
=== Final members ===
School	Location	Affiliation	Mascot	Colors	Joined	Left	Conference Joined	Current Conference
Almond	Almond, WI	Public	Eagles		1951	1962	Central-C	Central Wisconsin
Necedah	Necedah, WI	Public	Cardinals		1956	1962	Central-C	Scenic Bluffs
Oxford	Oxford, WI	Public	Bluejays		1954	1962	Central-C	Closed in 1963 (consolidated into Westfield)
Port Edwards	Port Edwards, WI	Public	Blackhawks		1958	1962	Central-C	Central Wisconsin
Wild Rose	Wild Rose, WI	Public	Wildcats		1951	1962	Central-C	Central Wisconsin

=== Previous members ===
School	Location	Affiliation	Mascot	Colors	Joined	Left	Conference Joined	Current Conference
Green Lake	Green Lake, WI	Public	Lakers		1951	1959	Fox Valley Tri-County	Trailways (coop with Princeton)
Oxford-Endeavor	Oxford, WI & Endeavor, WI	Public	Oxen		1951	1954	Athletic cooperative ended, Endeavor closed (consolidated into Portage)	
Princeton	Princeton, WI	Public	Tigers		1951	1954	Dual County	Trailways (coop with Green Lake)

=== Football-only members ===
School	Location	Affiliation	Mascot	Colors	Seasons	Primary Conference
Montello	Montello, WI	Public	Hilltoppers		1959-1960	7-C

== List of conference champions ==
=== Boys Basketball ===
School	Quantity	Years
Oxford	5	1954, 1955, 1956, 1960, 1961
Almond	3	1953, 1958, 1959
Necedah	2	1957, 1962
Oxford-Endeavor	1	1952
Wild Rose	1	1962
Green Lake	0	
Princeton	0	
Port Edwards	0	

=== Football ===
School	Quantity	Years
Oxford	6	1954, 1955, 1956, 1957, 1958, 1960
Montello	2	1959, 1960
Port Edwards	2	1958, 1961
Green Lake	1	1953
Oxford-Endeavor	1	1953
Almond	0	
Princeton	0	
Wild Rose	0	
