= Lake Emily, Wisconsin =

- Ghost town
- Location within Wisconsin
- Coordinates: 44°28′40″N 89°20′05″W
- Country: United States
- State: Wisconsin
- County: Portage
- Elevation: 1,129 ft (344 m)
- GNIS feature ID: 1851499

Lake Emily is a ghost town in the town of Amherst, Portage County, Wisconsin, United States. Lake Emily Park, located just west of Amherst Junction, Wisconsin is one of 24 areas managed by the Portage County Parks Department.
