= 7-C Conference =

Wisconsin high school athletic conference (1926–1962)

The 7-C Conference is a former high school athletic conference with its membership concentrated in central Wisconsin. It existed from 1926 to 1962, and its members belonged to the Wisconsin Interscholastic Athletic Association.

== History ==
=== 1926–1934 ===
Location of Original 7-C Conference Members

The 7-C Conference was formed in 1926 as the Four-County Conference, named after the four counties where member schools were located (Adams, Marquette, Portage and Waushara). It was initially made up of eleven small schools located in central Wisconsin: Almond, Coloma, Friendship, Hancock, Montello, Oxford, Plainfield, Redgranite, Wautoma, Westfield and Wild Rose. In 1929, Friendship High School merged with neighboring Adams High School to form the new Adams-Friendship High School, which retained Friendship's membership in the conference. That same year, the Four-County Conference added Neshkoro and Princeton to bring membership to thirteen schools. Despite the expansion into Green Lake County, the league did not change its name. Green Lake and Omro joined the 4-C Conference in 1931, and Winneconne became members of the conference in 1932. That same year, the conference's name was changed to the 6-C Conference, representing its expanded geographic footprint:

Big 6-C Conference	Little 6-C Conference
Adams-Friendship	Almond
Montello	Coloma
Omro	Green Lake
Redgranite	Hancock
Wautoma	Neshkoro
Westfield	Oxford
	Plainfield
	Princeton
	Wild Rose
	Winneconne

=== 1934–1942 ===
In 1934 the conference renamed itself the 7-C Conference because of the expansion into Wood County, adding Markesan to the Little 7-C and Port Edwards (formerly of the Wood County League) to the Big 7-C. Winneconne left to join the Little Nine Conference in 1935, and in 1937, the 7-C Conference realigned itself by geography instead of enrollment size:

Eastern 7-C Conference	Northern 7-C Conference	Western 7-C Conference
Green Lake	Almond	Adams-Friendship
Markesan	Coloma	Montello
Omro	Hancock	Plainfield
Princeton	Neshkoro	Port Edwards
Redgranite	Oxford	Wautoma
	Wild Rose	Westfield

Location of 7-C Conference Members (1938-1940)

Endeavor joined the 7-C Conference in 1938 as its eighteenth overall member, and was assigned to the Northern 7-C. In 1940, Wild Rose moved back to the Eastern 7-C after Omro's exit from the conference:

Eastern 7-C Conference	Northern 7-C Conference	Western 7-C Conference
Green Lake	Almond	Adams-Friendship
Markesan	Coloma	Montello
Princeton	Endeavor	Plainfield
Redgranite	Hancock	Port Edwards
Wild Rose	Neshkoro	Wautoma
	Oxford	Westfield

=== 1942–1946 ===
In 1942, the 7-C Conference disbanded for basketball because of wartime travel issues. The conference was revived for the 1943–44 school year, albeit with a reduced grouping of Adams-Friendship, Almond, Hancock, Plainfield, Port Edwards, Wautoma and Westfield. Former conference member Montello returned to the 7-C in 1944 along with several other schools, and the league split into two divisions by school enrollment size:

Big 7-C Conference	Little 7-C Conference
Adams-Friendship	Coloma
Almond	Endeavor
Montello	Green Lake
Plainfield	Hancock
Port Edwards	Markesan
Wautoma	Oxford
Westfield	Princeton

In 1945, the league welcomed back former members Omro and Wild Rose after the end of World War II. These two schools, along with Green Lake from the Little 7-C, were placed into the Big 7-C. The Little 7-C was left with five members following Green Lake's move and Markesan joining the Dual County Conference. The 7-C Conference also began sponsoring football with four conference members participating: Adams-Friendship, Omro, Wautoma and Westfield. Neshkoro was reinstated as a sixth member to the Little 7-C before the start of league competition, and the 7-C started the 1945–46 season with a sixteen-member roster:

Big 7-C Conference	Little 7-C Conference
Adams-Friendship	Coloma
Almond	Endeavor
Green Lake	Hancock
Montello	Neshkoro
Omro	Oxford
Plainfield	Princeton
Port Edwards	
Wautoma	
Westfield	
Wild Rose	

=== 1946–1962 ===
Location of Final 7-C Conference Members

After the end of World War II, the 7-C Conference began to lose members to school district consolidation. Coloma was the first to leave the conference for this reason, with their district folded into Westfield in 1946. To offset this loss, the Little 7-C added former members Redgranite and Wild Rose after the latter's shift from the Big 7-C. The next year, Hancock and Plainfield merged to form the new Tri-County High School in Plainfield. Almond moved over from the Big 7-C as their replacement. In 1948, the 7-C Conference lost two high schools to consolidation: Neshkoro (redistricted to Westfield) and Redgranite (redistricted to Berlin and Wautoma). In 1951, Endeavor High School closed its doors when it was consolidated into Oxford. That same year, Green Lake of the Big 7-C joined the four Little 7-C schools in seceding from the conference to form the new Central Lakes Conference. The seven members of what was formerly known as the Big 7-C continued on until Omro left to join the Little Nine Conference in 1956. Membership was whittled down to five schools in 1958 when Port Edwards left to join the Central Lakes Conference. Montello joined the Dual County Conference in 1961, further decreasing conference membership to four schools. Due in part to the rapid decline in membership, the 7-C Conference ceased operations in 1962. Three of its former members (Adams-Friendship, Tri-County and Westfield) aligned with the five Central Lakes Conference schools and Madonna High School in Mauston to form the new Central-C Conference. The fourth school (Wautoma) joined the Central Wisconsin Conference in the aftermath of the 7-C Conference's demise.

== Conference membership history ==
=== Final members ===
School	Location	Affiliation	Mascot	Colors	Joined	Left	Conference Joined	Current Conference
Adams-Friendship	Adams, WI	Public	Green Devils		1929, 1943	1942, 1962	Central-C	South Central
Tri-County	Plainfield, WI	Public	Penguins		1947	1962	Central-C	Central Wisconsin
Wautoma	Wautoma, WI	Public	Hornets		1926, 1943	1942, 1962	Central Wisconsin	South Central
Westfield	Westfield, WI	Public	Pioneers		1926, 1943	1942, 1962	Central-C	South Central

=== Previous members ===
School	Location	Affiliation	Mascot	Colors	Joined	Left	Conference Joined	Current Conference
Almond	Almond, WI	Public	Eagles		1926, 1943	1942, 1951	Central Lakes	Central Wisconsin
Coloma	Coloma, WI	Public	Cardinals		1926, 1944	1942, 1946	Closed (consolidated into Westfield)	
Endeavor	Endeavor, WI	Public	Cardinals		1938, 1944	1942, 1951	Central Lakes	Closed in 1954 (consolidated into Portage)
Friendship	Friendship, WI	Public	Gladiators	Unknown	1926	1929	Closed (merged into Adams-Friendship)	
Green Lake	Green Lake, WI	Public	Lakers		1931, 1944	1942, 1951	Central Lakes	Trailways (coop with Princeton)
Hancock	Hancock, WI	Public	Unknown		1926, 1943	1942, 1947	Closed (merged into Tri-County)	
Markesan	Markesan, WI	Public	Hornets		1934, 1944	1942, 1945	Dual County	Trailways
Montello	Montello, WI	Public	Hilltoppers		1926, 1944	1942, 1961	Dual County	Trailways
Neshkoro	Neshkoro, WI	Public	Unknown		1929, 1944	1942, 1948	Closed (consolidated into Westfield)	
Omro	Omro, WI	Public	Foxes		1931, 1945	1940, 1956	Little Nine	Wisconsin Flyway
Oxford	Oxford, WI	Public	Unknown		1926, 1944	1942, 1951	Central Lakes	Closed in 1963 (consolidated into Westfield)
Plainfield	Plainfield, WI	Public	Eagles		1926, 1943	1942, 1947	Closed (merged into Tri-County)	
Port Edwards	Port Edwards, WI	Public	Blackhawks		1934, 1943	1942, 1958	Central Lakes	Central Wisconsin
Princeton	Princeton, WI	Public	Tigers		1929, 1944	1942, 1951	Central Lakes	Trailways (coop with Green Lake)
Redgranite	Redgranite, WI	Public	Demons		1926, 1946	1942, 1948	Closed (consolidated into Berlin and Wautoma)	
Wild Rose	Wild Rose, WI	Public	Wildcats		1926, 1945	1942, 1951	Central Lakes	Central Wisconsin
Winneconne	Winneconne, WI	Public	Wolves		1932	1935	Little Nine	Bay

== Membership timeline ==
=== Full members ===
Big 4-C/6-C/7-C Little 4-C/6-C/7-C Eastern 7-C Northern 7-C Western 7-C

== List of state champions ==
=== Fall sports ===
None

=== Winter sports ===
None

=== Spring sports ===
Boys Track & Field
School	Year	Division
Wautoma	1949	Class C
Westfield	1952	Class C
Westfield	1955	Class C

== List of conference champions ==
=== Boys Basketball ===
School	Quantity	Years
Wautoma	9	1929, 1930, 1931, 1949, 1950, 1957, 1959, 1960, 1961
Westfield	9	1933, 1934, 1936, 1938, 1939, 1944, 1952, 1954, 1958
Adams-Friendship	7	1940, 1941, 1942, 1946, 1947, 1955, 1962
Port Edwards	6	1935, 1937, 1944, 1947, 1948, 1951
Omro	5	1938, 1939, 1946, 1953, 1956
Coloma	4	1934, 1935, 1938, 1946
Oxford	4	1941, 1947, 1948, 1949
Montello	3	1932, 1937, 1945
Plainfield	3	1927, 1936, 1937
Hancock	2	1939, 1946
Markesan	2	1940, 1945
Tri-County	2	1953, 1959
Wild Rose	2	1942, 1951
Almond	1	1950
Endeavor	1	1946
Neshkoro	1	1940
Winneconne	1	1933
Friendship	0	
Green Lake	0	
Princeton	0	
Redgranite	0	
Champions from 1928, 1941 (Eastern) and 1942 (Northern) unknown

=== Football ===
School	Quantity	Years
Wautoma	5	1947, 1953, 1955, 1959, 1960
Adams-Friendship	4	1945, 1946, 1958, 1961
Omro	3	1945, 1948, 1949
Westfield	3	1950, 1951, 1954
Tri-County	2	1956, 1957
Port Edwards	1	1952
Montello	0	
