= Amherst (town), Wisconsin =

Amherst, Wisconsin
- Town
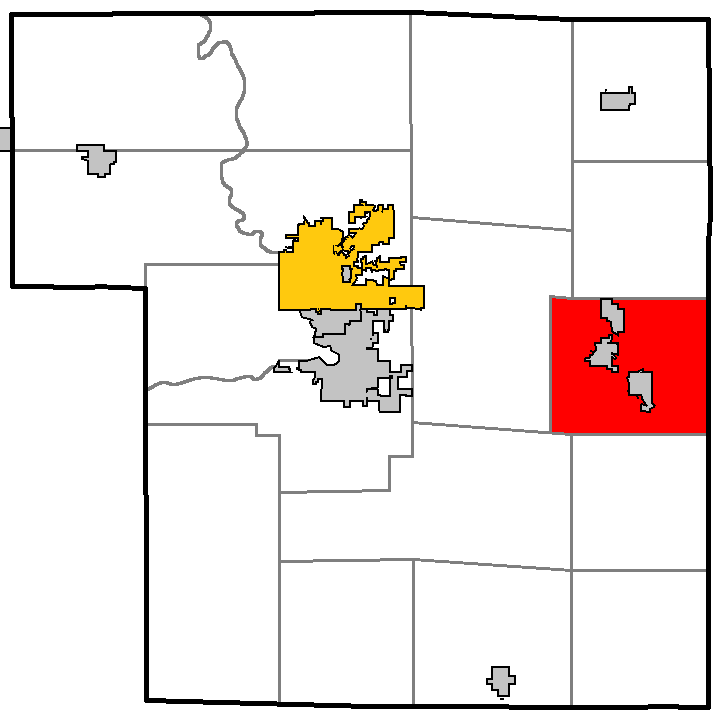
- Location of Amherst, Portage County

- Location of Portage County, Wisconsin
- Country: United States
- State: Wisconsin
- County: Portage

Area
  - Total: 38.21 sq mi (99.0 km^{2})
  - Land: 37.57 sq mi (97.3 km^{2})
  - Water: 0.64 sq mi (1.7 km^{2})

Population (2020)
  - Total: 1,402
  - Density: 37.32/sq mi (14.41/km^{2})
- Time zone: UTC-6 (Central (CST))
  - Summer (DST): UTC-5 (CDT)
- Area codes: 715 & 534
- Website: https://tn.amherst.wi.gov/

Amherst is a town in Portage County, Wisconsin, United States. The population was 1,402 at the 2020 census. The ghost town of Lake Emily was located in the town.

The Town of Amherst was established in 1851.

== Geography ==
According to the United States Census Bureau, the town has a total area of 38.5 square miles (99.7 km^{2}), of which 38.0 square miles (98.4 km^{2}) is land and 0.5 square mile (1.3 km^{2}) (1.35%) is water.

== Demographics ==
As of the census of 2000, there were 1,435 people, 494 households, and 390 families residing in the town. The population density was 37.8 people per square mile (14.6/km^{2}). There were 556 housing units at an average density of 14.6 per square mile (5.7/km^{2}). The racial makeup of the town was 98.19% White, 0.07% Black or African American, 0.21% Native American, 0.98% Asian, 0.14% from other races, and 0.42% from two or more races. 0.35% of the population were Hispanic or Latino of any race.

There were 494 households, out of which 37.9% had children under the age of 18 living with them, 70.6% were married couples living together, 3.8% had a female householder with no husband present, and 20.9% were non-families. 17.0% of all households were made up of individuals, and 6.9% had someone living alone who was 65 years of age or older. The average household size was 2.80 and the average family size was 3.17.

In the town, the population was spread out, with 26.1% under the age of 18, 6.3% from 18 to 24, 26.6% from 25 to 44, 28.5% from 45 to 64, and 12.5% who were 65 years of age or older. The median age was 39 years. For every 100 females, there were 107.4 males. For every 100 females age 18 and over, there were 100.9 males.

The median income for a household in the town was $50,435, and the median income for a family was $55,313. Males had a median income of $37,784 versus $25,536 for females. The per capita income for the town was $19,751. About 3.4% of families and 6.8% of the population were below the poverty line, including 2.1% of those under age 18 and 27.3% of those age 65 or over.

== Infrastructure ==
Amherst is home to the area's Telephone, Internet & Television company, named Amherst Telephone Company/Tomorrow Valley Communication. Amherst Telephone Company was incorporated on July 3, 1903. Capital to form the new company was provided by 62 area residents who pledged $25 each to buy a share of stock. Currently it provides Copper and Fiber service to Amherst as well as the surrounding communities of Rosholt, Amherst Junction and Polonia.
