= Amherst, Wisconsin =

Amherst
- Village
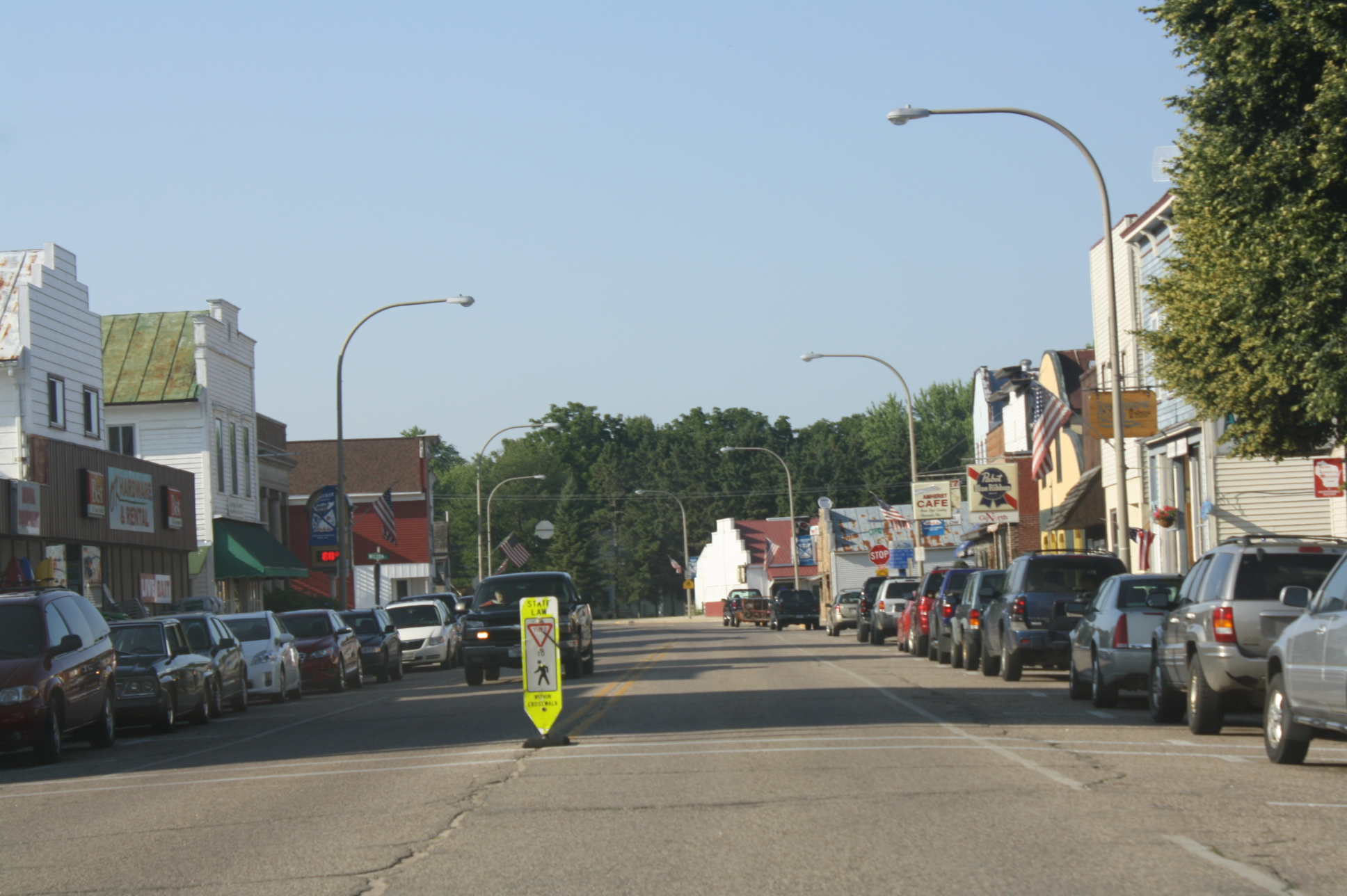
- Looking north at downtown Amherst

- Location of Amherst in Portage County, Wisconsin.

- Location within Wisconsin Location within the United States Location within North America
- Coordinates: 44°27′23″N 89°18′20″W
- Country: United States
- State: Wisconsin
- County: Portage

Government
  - Village Amherst: Michael Juris

Area
  - Total: 1.34 sq mi (3.46 km^{2})
  - Land: 1.28 sq mi (3.32 km^{2})
  - Water: 0.054 sq mi (0.14 km^{2})
- Elevation: 1,093 ft (333 m)

Population (2020)
  - Total: 1,117
  - Density: 871/sq mi (336/km^{2})
- Time zone: UTC-6 (Central (CST))
  - Summer (DST): UTC-5 (CDT)
- Zip code: 54406
- Area codes: 715 & 534
- FIPS code: 55-01775
- GNIS feature ID: 1582689
- Website: villageofamherst.wi.gov

Amherst is a village in Portage County, Wisconsin, United States. The population was 1,117 in the 2020 census. Amherst is at the core of the Tomorrow Valley area.

== History ==
The name Amherst was established in 1853 by Adam Uline, after General Jeffery Amherst of Revolutionary fame and the fact he was native of Amherst, Nova Scotia. The first known settler of Amherst was John F. Hillstrom, who arrived in 1851, while John and A. P. Een follow closely behind, arriving in August 1852.

== Geography ==
According to the United States Census Bureau, the village has a total area of 1.35 square miles (3.50 km^{2}), of which 1.30 square miles (3.37 km^{2}) is land and 0.05 square miles (0.13 km^{2}) is water.

== Demographics ==
Historical population
Census	Pop.	Note	%±
1880	298		—
1890	438		47.0%
1900	558		27.4%
1910	629		12.7%
1920	588		−6.5%
1930	577		−1.9%
1940	611		5.9%
1950	608		−0.5%
1960	596		−2.0%
1970	585		−1.8%
1980	701		19.8%
1990	792		13.0%
2000	964		21.7%
2010	1,035		7.4%
2020	1,117		7.9%
U.S. Decennial Census

=== 2010 census ===
As of the census of 2010, there were 1,035 people, 434 households, and 274 families living in the village. The population density was 796.2 inhabitants per square mile (307.4/km^{2}). There were 471 housing units at an average density of 362.3 per square mile (139.9/km^{2}). The racial makeup of the village was 97.9% White, 0.3% African American, 0.2% Asian, 0.9% from other races, and 0.8% from two or more races. Hispanic or Latino of any race were 2.5% of the population.

There were 434 households, of which 35.5% had children under the age of 18 living with them, 45.2% were married couples living together, 12.2% had a female householder with no husband present, 5.8% had a male householder with no wife present, and 36.9% were non-families. 31.6% of all households were made up of individuals, and 15% had someone living alone who was 65 years of age or older. The average household size was 2.38 and the average family size was 2.99.

The median age in the village was 35.1 years. 29% of residents were under the age of 18; 6% were between the ages of 18 and 24; 29.4% were from 25 to 44; 22.5% were from 45 to 64; and 13.1% were 65 years of age or older. The gender makeup of the village was 49.1% male and 50.9% female.

=== 2000 census ===
As of the census of 2000, there were 964 people, 395 households, and 250 families living in the village. As of the end of 2006, there was villagewide estimate of over 1,000 residents living there. The population density was 827.5 people per square mile (318.1/km^{2}). There were 419 housing units at an average density of 138.3 persons/km^{2} (359.7 persons/sq mi). The racial makeup of the village was 99.17% White, 0.41% African American, 0.10% Native American, 0.00% Asian, 0.00% Pacific Islander, 0.10% from other races, and 0.21% from two or more races. 0.52% of the population were Hispanic or Latino of any race.

There were 395 households, out of which 36.7% had children under the age of 18 living with them, 50.1% were married couples living together, 8.9% have a woman whose husband does not live with her, and 36.5% were non-families. 32.4% of all households were made up of individuals, and 17.5% had someone living alone who was 65 years of age or older. The average household size was 2.44 and the average family size was 3.14.

In the village, the population was spread out, with 29.6% under the age of 18, 7.9% from 18 to 24, 28.5% from 25 to 44, 21.7% from 45 to 64, and 12.3% who were 65 years of age or older. The median age was 34 years. For every 100 females, there were 97.9 males. For every 100 females age 18 and over, there were 88.6 males.

The median income for a household in the village was $40,125, and the median income for a family was $54,821. Males had a median income of $37,132 versus $24,375 for females. The per capita income for the village was $18,514. 10.8% of the population and 7.7% of families were below the poverty line. Out of the total people living in poverty, 13.2% are under the age of 18 and 14.2% are 65 or older.

== Public services ==
Amherst is served by the Tomorrow River School District, which has Amherst High School, Amherst Middle School, and Amherst Elementary School, all on one K-12 campus. Fire protection and ambulance service are provided by the Amherst Fire District. Police protection is provided by the Portage County Sheriff's Department. Other village services include a public library and the Lettie Jensen Community Center. There is a riverside park downtown along the Tomorrow River.

== Transportation ==
Amherst connects to U.S. Highway 10 (US 10). The Canadian National Railway main line runs through the village, on an elevated grade.

== Infrastructure ==
Amherst is home to the Amherst Telephone Company/Tomorrow Valley Communications. Amherst Telephone Company was incorporated on July 3, 1903. Capital to form the new company was provided by 62 area residents who pledged $25 each to buy a share of stock. The company provides copper and fiber service to Amherst and the surrounding communities of Rosholt, Amherst Junction, and Polonia.

== Mill Pond ==
The Amherst Millpond is a 48-acre, hard water impoundment located in the village of Amherst. The mill pond was created by a dam on the Tomorrow River and was once used for power to the local feed mil. The pond has a maximum depth of five feet and a bottom consisting of sand covered with silt. The Tomorrow River is navigable above and below the dam, and there are two public access points on the east side of the pond; the boat landing and Cate Park. The pond has northern pike and panfish for fishing.

== Fairgrounds ==
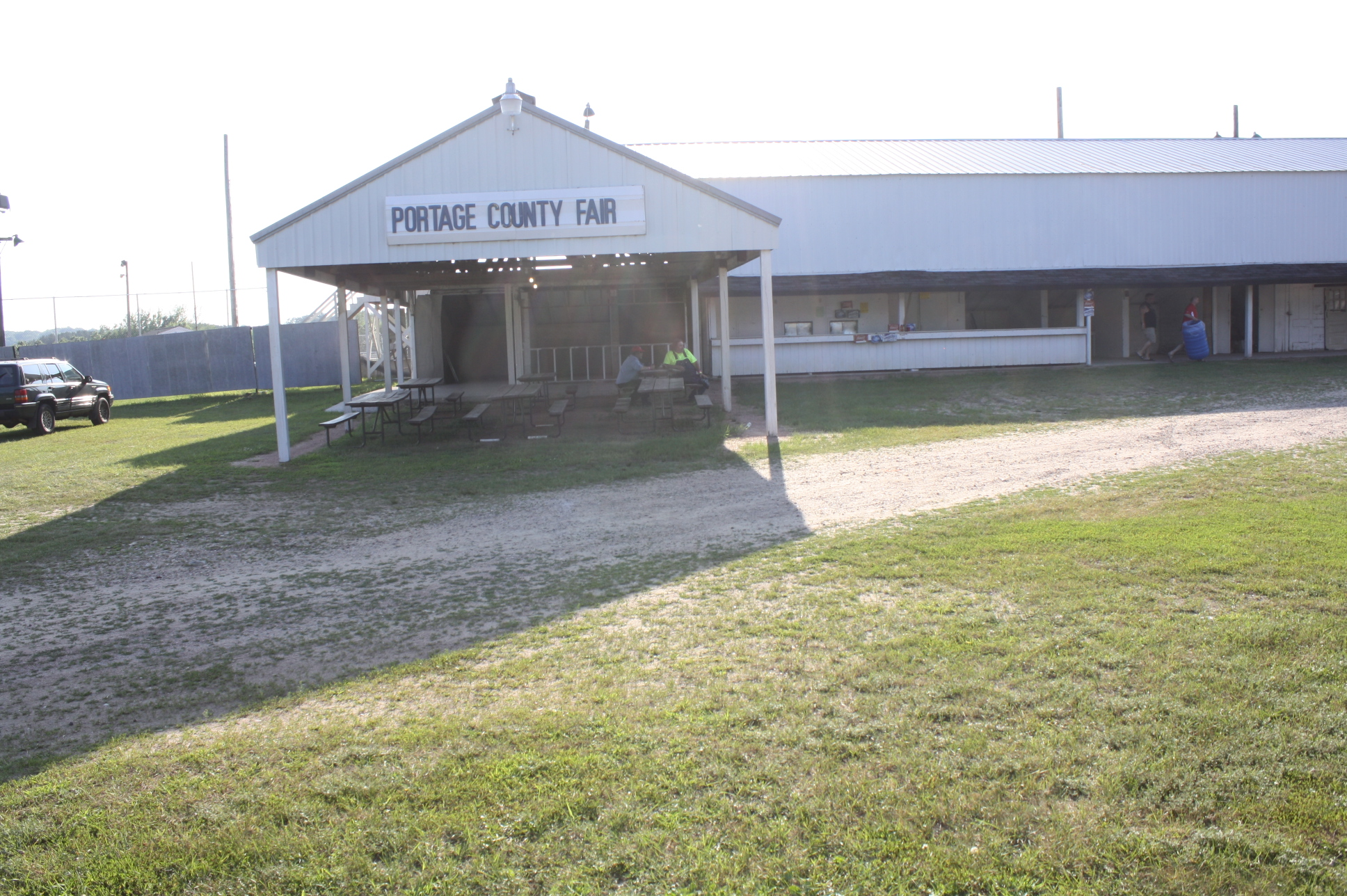
Fairgrounds

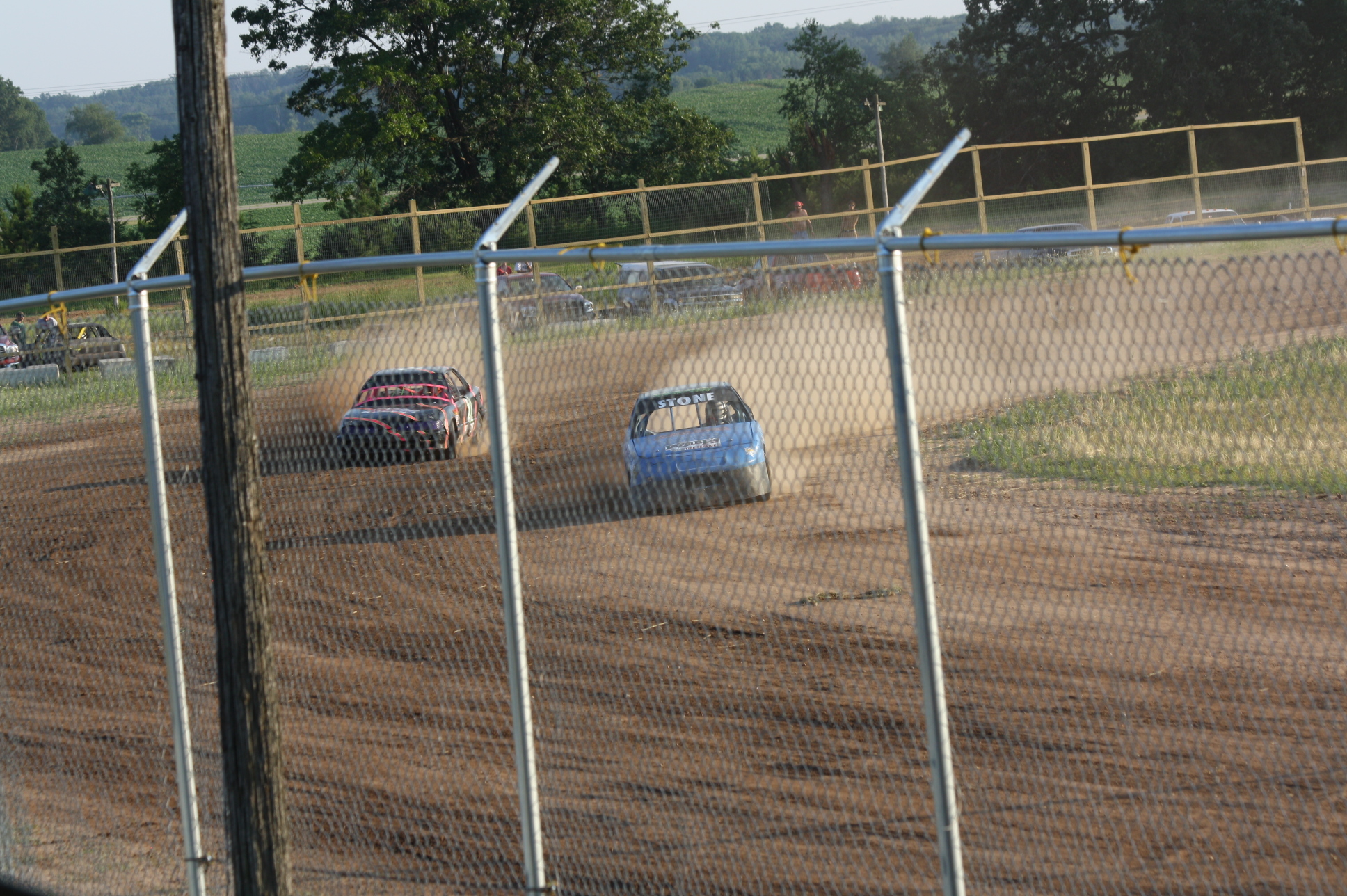
4 cylinder stock cars racing at the fairgrounds

Fairgrounds were built in 1917. Amherst hosts the Portage County Fair, an Amish craft fair, and other events at the fairgrounds. Stock car racing began at the fairgrounds in 2013 under the name Amherst Speedway.

== Notable people ==
- Tyler Biadasz, football player
- Charles Couch, legislator
- Charles F. Hanke, legislator
- Herman H. Hoffman, legislator
- Norman Myhra, businessman and legislator
- Timothy Olson, ultrarunner
- David Zenoff, Nevada Supreme Court justice

== Images ==
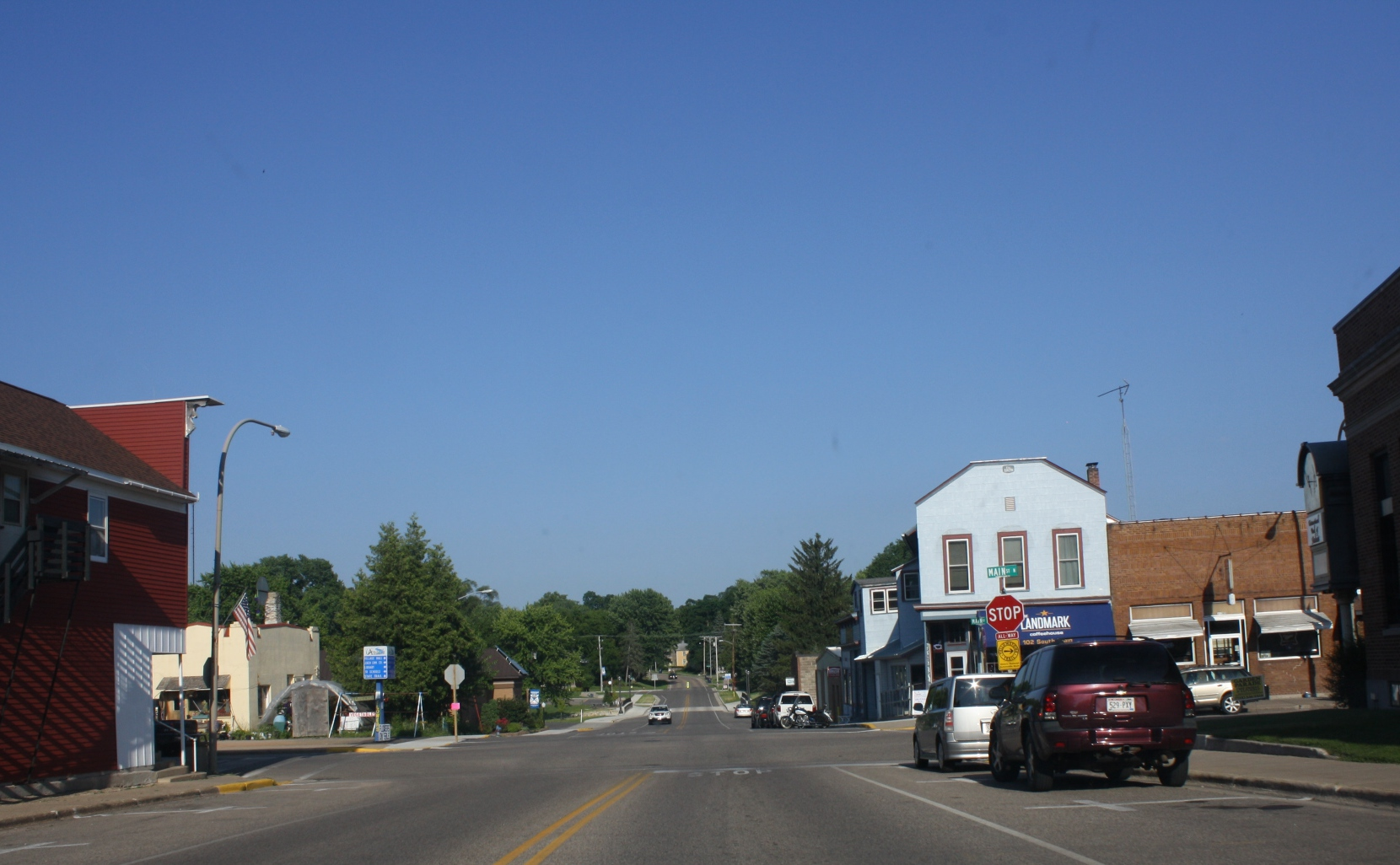
Looking east in downtown Amherst

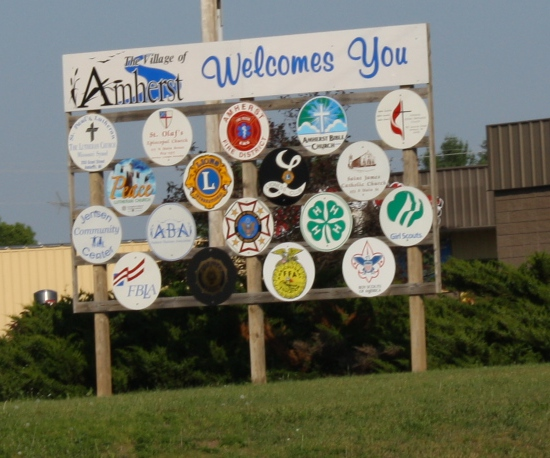
Welcome sign
