= Nelsonville, Wisconsin =

- Village
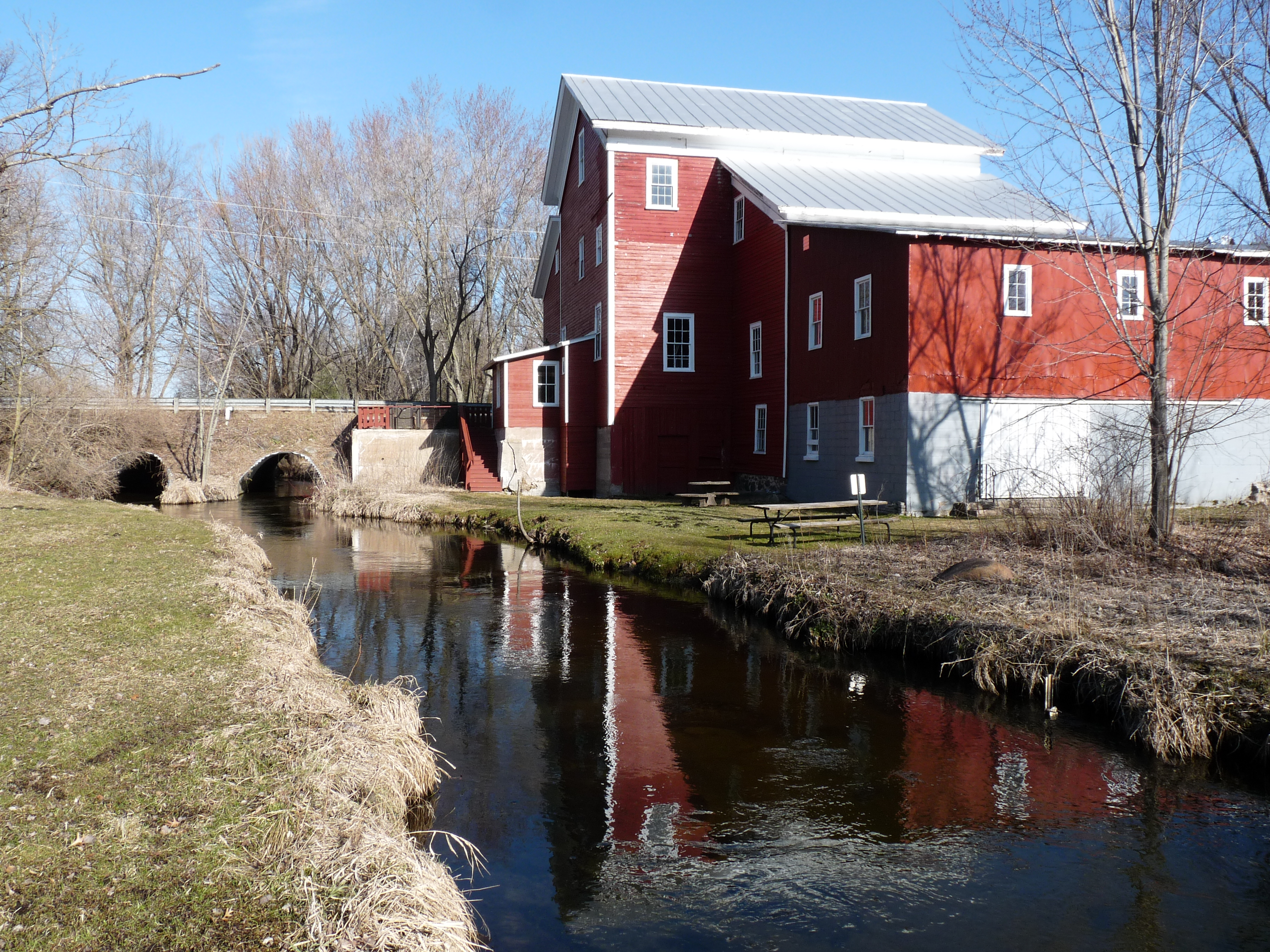
- Rising Star Flouring Mill, built in 1868 by Nelsonville's founder

- Location of Nelsonville in Portage County, Wisconsin.
- Coordinates: 44°29′35″N 89°18′44″W
- Country: United States
- State: Wisconsin
- County: Portage

Area
  - Total: 1.05 sq mi (2.71 km^{2})
  - Land: 1.03 sq mi (2.67 km^{2})
  - Water: 0.015 sq mi (0.04 km^{2})
- Elevation: 1,073 ft (327 m)

Population (2020)
  - Total: 158
  - Density: 153/sq mi (59.2/km^{2})
- Time zone: UTC-6 (Central (CST))
  - Summer (DST): UTC-5 (CDT)
- Zip code(s): 54407, 54458
- Area codes: 715 & 534
- FIPS code: 55-56000
- GNIS feature ID: 1570168
- Website: https://www.villageofnelsonville.com/

Nelsonville is a village in Portage County, Wisconsin, United States. The population was 158 at the 2020 census.

== History ==
The community of Nelsonville began about 1855 when English immigrant Jerome Nelson built a six-foot-high dam spanning the Tomorrow River, with a sawmill across the river from where the flouring mill now stands. After Nelson returned from the Civil War he added the flouring mill in 1868. A post office was added in 1871, named Nelsonville for the mill owner. By 1876 two other businesses were there: the Nelson & Loberg general store, and Peterson Boots and Shoes. Other business started in subsequent years, and the Norwegian Lutheran church in 1888.

By 1913 the community had grown to about 170 people and other businesses included Swenson's Furniture Store, Loberg Company Mill, Nelsonville Creamery, and the State Bank of Nelsonville. At this point the community incorporated as a village, in part in an effort to remove saloons that the town of Amherst refused to outlaw. The other high priority was to stop the pasturing of stock on the streets of the village.

== Geography ==
Nelsonville is located at 44°29′35″N 89°18′44″W (44.493067, -89.312358).

According to the United States Census Bureau, the village has a total area of 1.05 square miles (2.72 km^{2}), of which 1.03 square miles (2.67 km^{2}) is land and 0.02 square miles (0.05 km^{2}) is water.

== Demographics ==
Historical population
Census	Pop.	Note	%±
1920	187		—
1930	198		5.9%
1940	180		−9.1%
1950	188		4.4%
1960	170		−9.6%
1970	152		−10.6%
1980	199		30.9%
1990	171		−14.1%
2000	191		11.7%
2010	155		−18.8%
2020	158		1.9%
U.S. Decennial Census

=== 2010 census ===
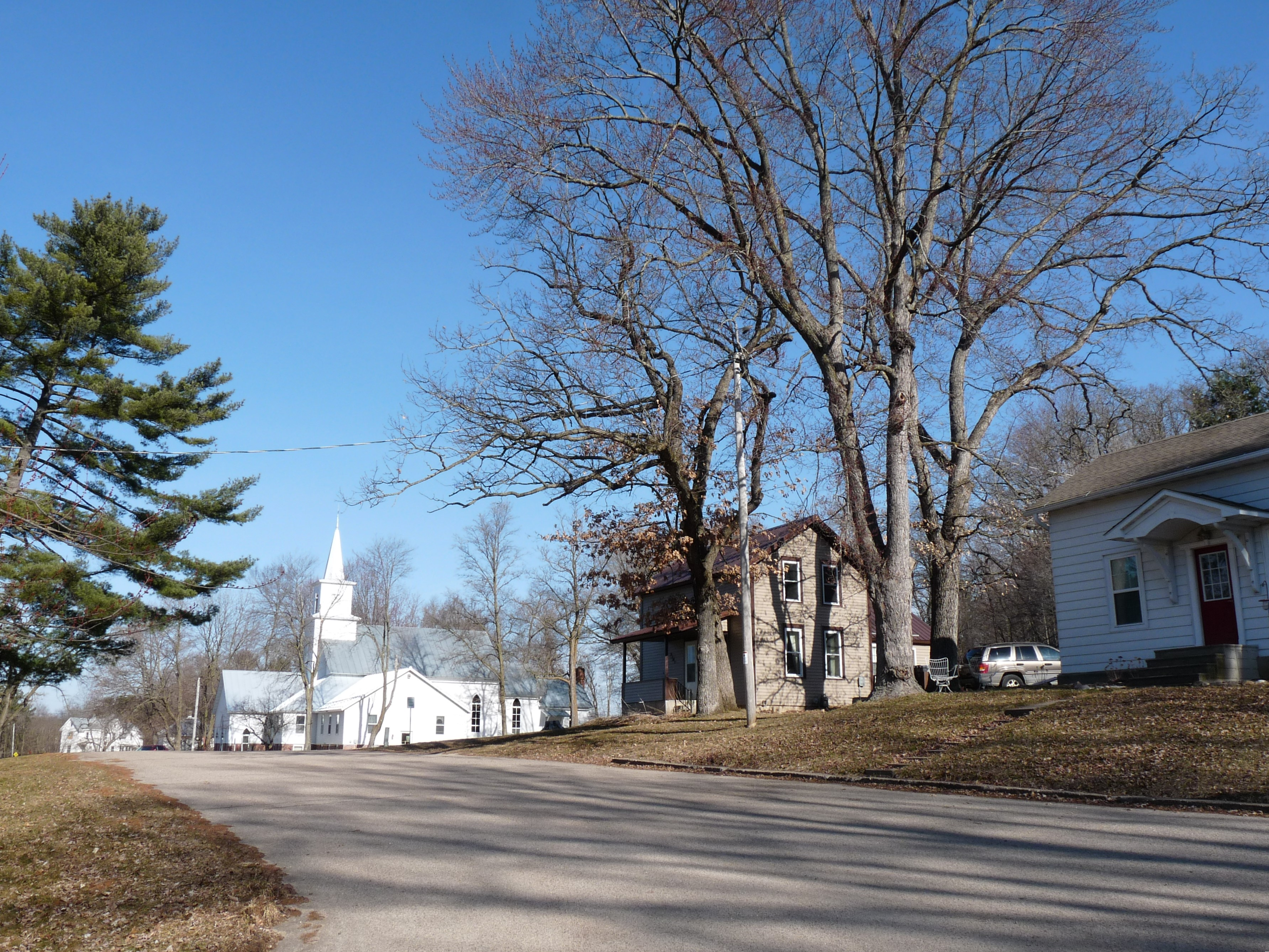
Residential neighborhood in March, with the Lutheran church at left

As of the census of 2010, there were 155 people, 61 households, and 39 families living in the village. The population density was 150.5 inhabitants per square mile (58.1/km^{2}). There were 67 housing units at an average density of 65.0 per square mile (25.1/km^{2}). The racial makeup of the village was 96.8% White, 0.6% African American, 0.6% from other races, and 1.9% from two or more races. Hispanic or Latino of any race were 1.3% of the population.

There were 61 households, of which 34.4% had children under the age of 18 living with them, 52.5% were married couples living together, 8.2% had a female householder with no husband present, 3.3% had a male householder with no wife present, and 36.1% were non-families. 26.2% of all households were made up of individuals, and 8.2% had someone living alone who was 65 years of age or older. The average household size was 2.54 and the average family size was 3.03.

The median age in the village was 42.5 years. 25.8% of residents were under the age of 18; 7.2% were between the ages of 18 and 24; 24.5% were from 25 to 44; 27.8% were from 45 to 64; and 14.8% were 65 years of age or older. The gender makeup of the village was 50.3% male and 49.7% female.

=== 2000 census ===
As of the census of 2000, there were 191 people, 72 households, and 52 families living in the village. The population density was 190.7 people per square mile (73.7/km^{2}). There were 74 housing units at an average density of 73.9 per square mile (28.6/km^{2}). The racial makeup of the village was 97.38% White, 1.05% Native American, and 1.57% from two or more races.

There were 72 households, out of which 30.6% had children under the age of 18 living with them, 66.7% were married couples living together, 5.6% had a female householder with no husband present, and 26.4% were non-families. 23.6% of all households were made up of individuals, and 6.9% had someone living alone who was 65 years of age or older. The average household size was 2.65 and the average family size was 3.09.

In the village, the population was spread out, with 28.8% under the age of 18, 5.8% from 18 to 24, 33.5% from 25 to 44, 20.9% from 45 to 64, and 11.0% who were 65 years of age or older. The median age was 34 years. For every 100 females, there were 89.1 males. For every 100 females age 18 and over, there were 88.9 males.

The median income for a household in the village was $41,875, and the median income for a family was $56,250. Males had a median income of $32,500 versus $23,438 for females. The per capita income for the village was $19,708. None of the families and 2.4% of the population were living below the poverty line, including no under eighteens and 13.0% of those over 64.
