= Amherst Junction, Wisconsin =

- Village
- Location of Amherst Junction in Portage County, Wisconsin.
- Coordinates: 44°28′10″N 89°19′1″W
- Country: United States
- State: Wisconsin
- County: Portage

Area
  - Total: 1.24 sq mi (3.22 km^{2})
  - Land: 1.24 sq mi (3.20 km^{2})
  - Water: 0.0077 sq mi (0.02 km^{2})
- Elevation: 1,109 ft (338 m)

Population (2020)
  - Total: 383
  - Density: 310/sq mi (120/km^{2})
- Time zone: UTC-6 (Central (CST))
  - Summer (DST): UTC-5 (CDT)
- Zip code: 54407
- Area codes: 715 & 534
- FIPS code: 55-01800
- GNIS feature ID: 1560833

Amherst Junction is a village in Portage County, Wisconsin, United States. The population was 383 at the 2020 census.

== History ==
Amherst Junction was created when the railroad first came through the county. It was a junction between two railroads: the Wisconsin Central and the Green Bay and Lake Pepin railroads.

Until 1875, the community was referred to as Groversburg, presumably after the Grover family that held considerable property in the area. But when a post office was established in March 1875, it was called Amherst Junction.

It was not until 1911 that the village was incorporated. By 1914, the village had become an important buying and shipping center for potatoes. Many people traveling to the eastern and northeastern parts of the county would detrain in Amherst Junction and hire a rig from a livery in the village to take them to their destination.

The village at one time had 36 businesses which included: five taverns, two hotels, two grocery stores, dancehalls, depots, feed stores, four potato warehouses, a blacksmith, a livery stable, a meat market, bank, hardware store, car dealership, a post office, a school, and a turkey processing plant.

The Summit House, a fairly large hotel, was built in the village around 1872 or 1873 by H. N. Livermore. Since the hotel was a popular place to stay, eat and dance, Amherst Junction must have been a gathering center for many of the surrounding communities. The Summit House remained in business until 1939, when it was dismantled and its lumber was used to build a new home for the owner. At one time, the hotel was operated by Zilphia Moyers Een, the county's first woman hotel keeper.

== Geography ==
Amherst Junction is located at 44°28′10″N 89°19′1″W (44.469523, -89.316827).

According to the United States Census Bureau, the village has a total area of 1.22 square miles (3.16 km^{2}), of which 1.21 square miles (3.13 km^{2}) is land and 0.01 square miles (0.03 km^{2}) is water.

== Demographics ==
Historical population
Census	Pop.	Note	%±
1880	49		—
1920	192		—
1930	210		9.4%
1940	197		−6.2%
1950	185		−6.1%
1960	131		−29.2%
1970	141		7.6%
1980	225		59.6%
1990	269		19.6%
2000	305		13.4%
2010	377		23.6%
2020	383		1.6%
U.S. Decennial Census

=== 2010 census ===
As of the census of 2010, there were 377 people, 137 households, and 102 families living in the village. The population density was 311.6 inhabitants per square mile (120.3/km^{2}). There were 146 housing units at an average density of 120.7 per square mile (46.6/km^{2}). The racial makeup of the village was 100.0% White. Hispanic or Latino of any race were 0.5% of the population.

There were 137 households, of which 42.3% had children under the age of 18 living with them, 65.7% were married couples living together, 3.6% had a female householder with no husband present, 5.1% had a male householder with no wife present, and 25.5% were non-families. 18.2% of all households were made up of individuals, and 4.3% had someone living alone who was 65 years of age or older. The average household size was 2.75 and the average family size was 3.16.

The median age in the village was 35.2 years. 28.9% of residents were under the age of 18; 6.9% were between the ages of 18 and 24; 29.8% were from 25 to 44; 25.4% were from 45 to 64; and 9% were 65 years of age or older. The gender makeup of the village was 49.3% male and 50.7% female.

=== 2000 census ===
As of the census of 2000, there were 305 people, 109 households, and 75 families living in the village. The population density was 256.2 people per square mile (99.0/km^{2}). There were 111 housing units at an average density of 93.2 per square mile (36.0/km^{2}). The racial makeup of the village was 100.00% White.

There were 109 households, out of which 39.4% had children under the age of 18 living with them, 56.0% were married couples living together, 7.3% had a female householder with no husband present, and 30.3% were non-families. 19.3% of all households were made up of individuals, and 7.3% had someone living alone who was 65 years of age or older. The average household size was 2.80 and the average family size was 3.28.

In the village, the population was spread out, with 30.8% under the age of 18, 11.5% from 18 to 24, 34.8% from 25 to 44, 16.1% from 45 to 64, and 6.9% who were 65 years of age or older. The median age was 30 years. For every 100 females, there were 107.5 males. For every 100 females age 18 and over, there were 104.9 males.

The median income for a household in the village was $44,500, and the median income for a family was $50,750. Males had a median income of $36,667 versus $21,563 for females. The per capita income for the village was $19,261. None of the families and 1.8% of the population were living below the poverty line, including no under eighteens and 9.5% of those over 64.
