= Rosholt, Wisconsin =

- Village
- Location of Rosholt in Portage County, Wisconsin.
- Coordinates: 44°37′50″N 89°18′27″W
- Country: United States
- State: Wisconsin
- County: Portage

Government
  - Village President: Robert Kurszewski

Area
  - Total: 1.08 sq mi (2.81 km^{2})
  - Land: 1.05 sq mi (2.72 km^{2})
  - Water: 0.035 sq mi (0.09 km^{2})
- Elevation: 1,138 ft (347 m)

Population (2020)
  - Total: 478
  - Density: 462.7/sq mi (178.66/km^{2})
- Time zone: UTC-6 (Central (CST))
  - Summer (DST): UTC-5 (CDT)
- ZIP code: 54473
- Area codes: 715 & 534
- FIPS code: 55-69575
- GNIS feature ID: 1572619
- Website: villageofrosholt.wi.gov

Rosholt is a village in Portage County, Wisconsin, United States. The population was 478 at the 2020 census.

== History ==
The person recorded as first owning the land on which Rosholt sits is Gottlieb Stanbly. Stanbly received four 40-acre (160,000 m^{2}) parcels directly from the U.S. Government on May 10, 1858, because he was a veteran. Gottlieb Stanbly sold the land to Theodor Stanbly in 1861 for $430 when Gottlieb left the area to fight in the Civil War. Theodor sold the land to Jens Rasmussen in 1867 for $400. Rasmussen created a millpond by damming Flume Creek, and built a water-driven feed mill sometime between 1867 and 1881. John Gilbert (J.G.) Rosholt built the first sawmill in town on the east end of the millpond in 1884, after making a deal to share water rights with Rasmussen. J.G. Rosholt's first mill burned in 1901, but it was rebuilt later that year and into 1902. The first survey and platting of Rosholt was done on June 1, 1903, at J.G. Rosholt's request. Rosholt was incorporated in 1907 and was named after J.G. Rosholt, who was elected the first village president on April 7, 1908.

== Geography ==
Rosholt is located at 44°37′50″N 89°18′27″W (44.630421, -89.307414).

According to the United States Census Bureau, the village has a total area of 1.10 square miles (2.85 km^{2}), of which 1.06 square miles (2.75 km^{2}) is land and 0.04 square miles (0.10 km^{2}) is water.

== Demographics ==
Historical population
Census	Pop.	Note	%±
1910	383		—
1920	448		17.0%
1930	515		15.0%
1940	523		1.6%
1950	508		−2.9%
1960	497		−2.2%
1970	466		−6.2%
1980	520		11.6%
1990	512		−1.5%
2000	518		1.2%
2010	506		−2.3%
2020	478		−5.5%
U.S. Decennial Census

=== 2010 census ===
As of the census of 2010, there were 506 people, 208 households, and 136 families living in the village. The population density was 477.4 inhabitants per square mile (184.3/km^{2}). There were 227 housing units at an average density of 214.2 per square mile (82.7/km^{2}). The racial makeup of the village was 98.4% White, 1.4% Native American, and 0.2% from two or more races. Hispanic or Latino of any race were 3.2% of the population.

There were 208 households, of which 36.1% had children under the age of 18 living with them, 46.2% were married couples living together, 13.0% had a female householder with no husband present, 6.3% had a male householder with no wife present, and 34.6% were non-families. 28.8% of all households were made up of individuals, and 10.1% had someone living alone who was 65 years of age or older. The average household size was 2.43 and the average family size was 3.02.

The median age in the village was 36.4 years. 27.5% of residents were under the age of 18; 6% were between the ages of 18 and 24; 30.6% were from 25 to 44; 23.6% were from 45 to 64; and 12.1% were 65 years of age or older. The gender makeup of the village was 50.8% male and 49.2% female.

=== 2000 census ===
As of the census of 2000, there were 518 people, 198 households, and 135 families living in the village. The population density was 487.1 people per square mile (188.7/km^{2}). There were 212 housing units at an average density of 199.3 per square mile (77.2/km^{2}). The racial makeup of the village was 98.65% White, 0.39% Native American, 0.77% from other races, and 0.19% from two or more races. Hispanic or Latino of any race were 2.12% of the population.

There were 198 households, out of which 38.9% had children under the age of 18 living with them, 49.5% were married couples living together, 12.6% had a female householder with no husband present, and 31.8% were non-families. 26.8% of all households were made up of individuals, and 12.6% had someone living alone who was 65 years of age or older. The average household size was 2.62 and the average family size was 3.22.

In the village, the population was spread out, with 30.7% under the age of 18, 8.9% from 18 to 24, 31.1% from 25 to 44, 15.8% from 45 to 64, and 13.5% who were 65 years of age or older. The median age was 31 years. For every 100 females, there were 103.1 males. For every 100 females age 18 and over, there were 99.4 males.

The median income for a household in the village was $42,750, and the median income for a family was $48,636. Males had a median income of $31,923 versus $23,889 for females. The per capita income for the village was $16,002. About 3.9% of families and 6.1% of the population were below the poverty line, including 2.8% of those under age 18 and 7.2% of those age 65 or over.

== Special events ==
Rosholt hosts the Portage County/Rosholt/The Worlds Fair every Labor Day weekend on their fairgrounds, which attracts all ages with games, food, carnival rides, animal showings, bands, and the slow-pitch softball tournament. The fair park also hosts annually the Rosholt Fireworks on the Fourth of July, Good Times in the Pines, The Thresheree, and Bluegrass In The Pines (a bluegrass music festival).

== Gallery ==
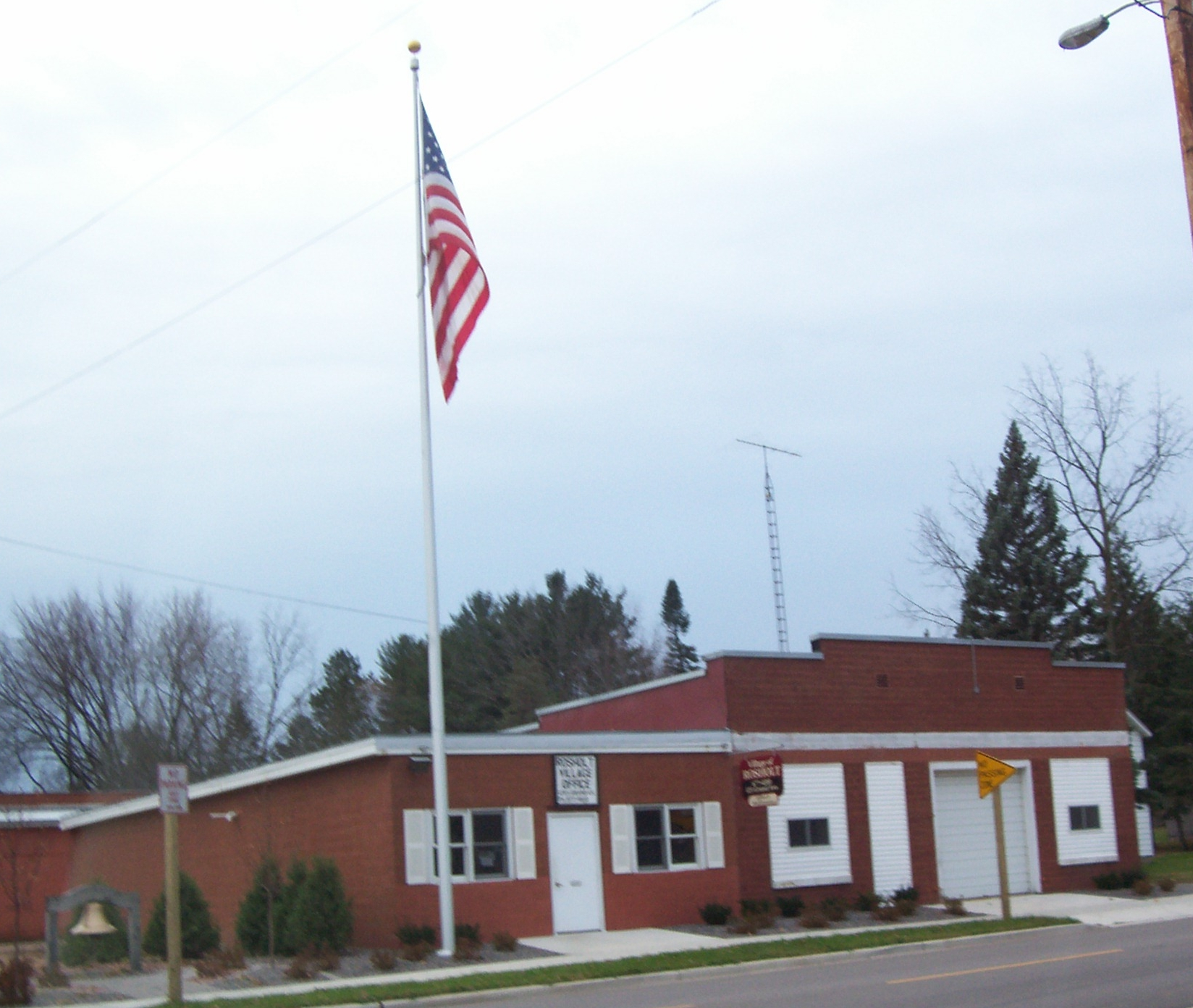
Village hall

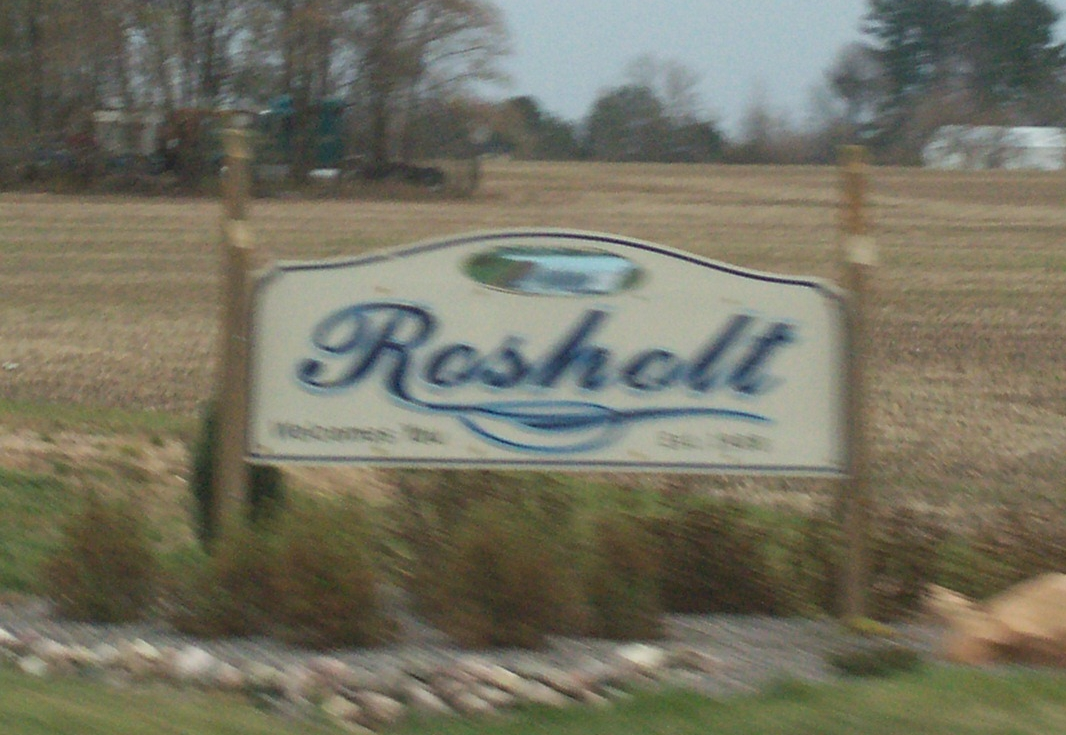
Welcome sign

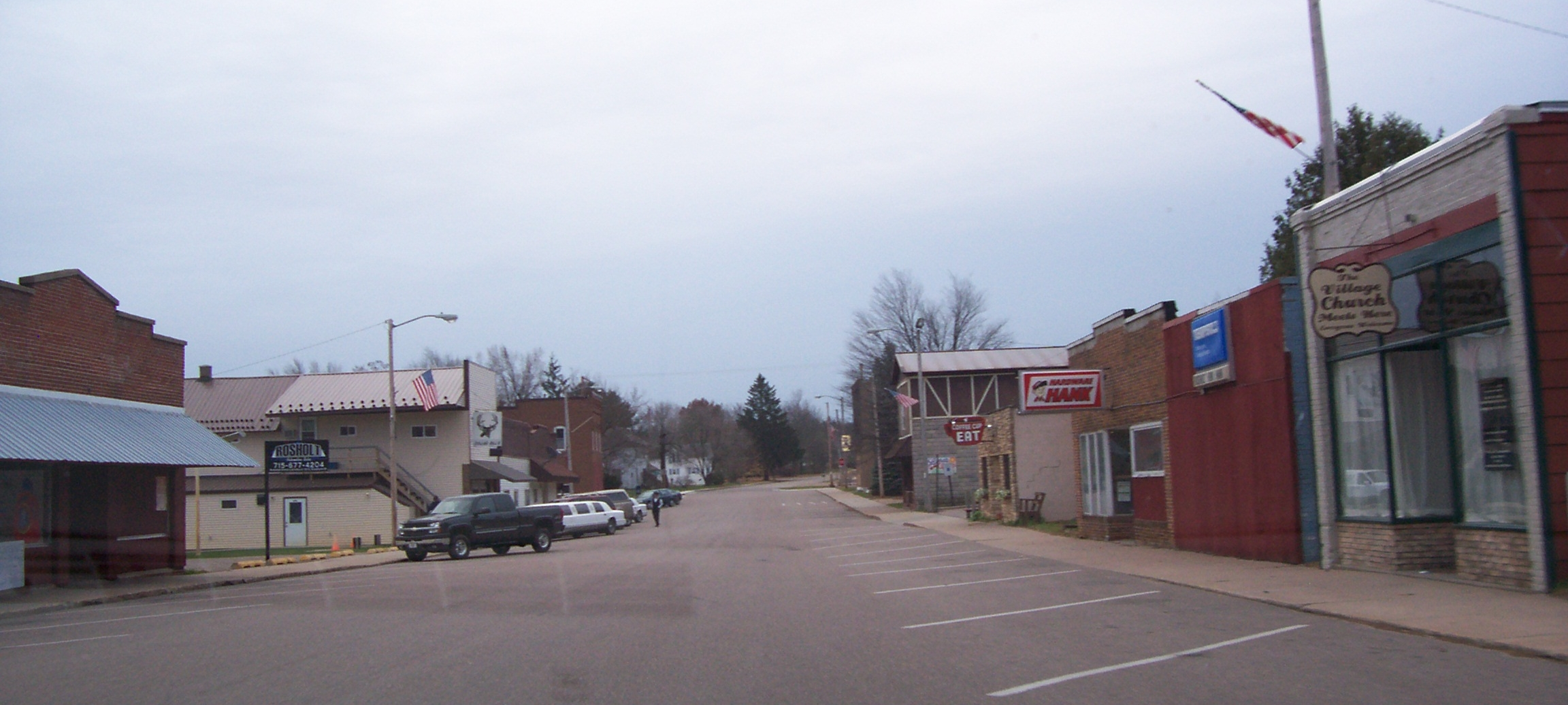
Downtown Rosholt

== See also ==
- List of villages in Wisconsin
