= Red River =

Red River may refer to one of the following:

== Rivers ==
=== United States ===
- Red River of the South, a tributary of the Mississippi in Texas, Oklahoma, Arkansas and Louisiana in the United States
- Red River of the North in Canada and the United States
- Red River (Cumberland River), a tributary of the Cumberland in Kentucky and Tennessee
- Red River (Illinois), a tributary of Panther Creek in Woodford County
- Red River (Kentucky River), a tributary of the Kentucky
- Red River (Maine), a tributary of the Fish
- Red River (New Mexico), a tributary of the Rio Grande
- Red River (New York), a tributary of the Moose
- Red River (Oregon), in the United States
- Red River (St. Louis River tributary), in Minnesota and Wisconsin
- Red River (Wolf River tributary), in Wisconsin

=== Elsewhere ===
- Red River (Asia) (Chinese: 紅河, 红河, Hóng Hé; Vietnamese: Sông Hồng)
- Red River (Victoria), in Australia
- Red River (British Columbia), a tributary of the Kechika in Canada
- Red River Floodway, a diversion of the Red River of the North around Winnipeg in Canada
- Red River (Grenada)
- Red River (New Zealand), a minor river on the North Island
- Red River (Amal) (Cornish: Dowr Amal), in the United Kingdom, discharging into Cornwall's south coast
- Red River (Koner) (Cornish: Dowr Koner), in the United Kingdom, discharging into Cornwall's north coast
- Baloué River, in Mali (Manding: "Red River")
- Kızılırmak River or Halys River, in Turkey (Turkish: "Red River")
- Sutlej, river in India and Pakistan, sometimes known as the Red River

== Settlements ==
- Red River, Nova Scotia, an unincorporated community in Canada
- Red River, New Mexico, a ski resort in the United States
- Red River, South Carolina, an unincorporated community in York County
- Red River, Tennessee, original name of the city now known as Adams
- Red River City, Texas, former town of 1870s, now part of Denison, Texas
- Red River, Kewaunee County, Wisconsin, a town in the United States
- Red River, Shawano County, Wisconsin, an unincorporated community in the United States
- Red River Army Depot, in Texas, United States
- Red River Colony, in Manitoba, Canada
- Red River, Queensland, a rural locality in Australia

== Battles ==
- Red River War, a United States military campaign in 1874–75

== Areas ==
- Red River County, Texas, in the United States
- Red River Delta, an administrative region of Vietnam
- Red River Parish, Louisiana, in the United States
- Red River Valley, a region in Canada that is drained by the Red River of the North
- Honghe Hani and Yi Autonomous Prefecture, Yunnan, in China (Mandarin: "Red River")

== Mythology ==
- Red River (mythology) in Chinese mythology, one of the four cardinal rivers which flows out of the mythical Kunlun

== Other uses ==
- Red River (1948 film), an American film named for the Texan river, produced by Howard Hawks and starring John Wayne
- Red River (1988 film), a television movie remake of the classic film from 1948, starring James Arness, Bruce Boxleitner, and Gregory Harrison
- Red River Valley (1997 film), a Chinese film about British intrusion of Tibet
- Red River (2009 film), a Chinese film named for the Yunnanese river
- Red River (manga), a 1995 Japanese graphic novel series named for the Turkish river
- Red River, a fictional river in City of Heroes
- Red River Cereal, a flax-based hot breakfast cereal
- Red River College, a college in Winnipeg, Manitoba, Canada
- Red River Drifter, 2013 album by Michael Martin Murphey
- Red River Trails, historical trails of the Red River of the North
- "Red River Valley", an American folk song set along one of the American Red Rivers
- Red River, 2006 novel by Lalita Tademy
- Red River Rivalry, a college football rivalry between Oklahoma and Texas

== See also ==
- Colorado River (disambiguation), for rivers bearing the Spanish word for "Red"
- Ipiranga (disambiguation) (sometimes Ypiranga), for places bearing the Tupian word for "Red River"
- Ipiranga River (disambiguation), for rivers bearing the Tupian word for "Red River"
- Little Red River (disambiguation)
- Red River cart, a two-wheeled cart used historically in the area of the Red River of the North
- Red River Campaign, a series of battles fought in the American Civil War in 1864
- Red River Exhibition, annual festival in Canada
- Red River Expedition (disambiguation), various expeditions of that name
- Red River floods, various floods of the Red River of the North
- Red river hog, an African species of wild pig, reddish in color
- Red River Rebellion, the Métis rebellion led by Louis Riel in present-day Manitoba, Canada
- Red River Showdown, an annual football game between the University of Oklahoma and the University of Texas
- Rouge River (disambiguation), for rivers bearing the French word for "Red"
- Red River Valley (disambiguation)
- Río Tinto
