= Wisconsin's 87th Assembly district =

American legislative district for north-central Wisconsin

Wisconsin's 87th State Assembly district
- 2024 map defined in 2023 Wisc. Act 94; 2022 map defined in Johnson v. Wisconsin Elections Commission; 2011 map was defined in 2011 Wisc. Act 43
Assemblymember
Brent Jacobson; R–Mosinee
since January 6, 2025 (1 year, 52 days)
- Demographics: 93.2% White; 0.54% Black; 1.6% Hispanic; 2.43% Asian; 1.66% Native American; 0.08% Hawaiian/Pacific Islander
- Population (2020) • Voting age: 59,487; 46,621
- Website: Official website
- Notes: Northwest Wisconsin

The 87th Assembly district of Wisconsin is one of 99 districts in the Wisconsin State Assembly. Located in northwest Wisconsin, the district comprises the southeastquarter of Marathon County and much of the northern half of Waupaca County, along with parts of northeast Portage County and western Shawano County. It includes the cities of Mosinee, Marion, and Schofield, and the villages of Big Falls, Birnamwood, Eland, Elderon, Hatley, Iola, Rosholt, Rothschild, Scandinavia, Tigerton, and Wittenberg. The district also contains Rib Mountain State Park and Central Wisconsin Airport The district is represented by Republican Brent Jacobson, since January 2025.

The 87th Assembly district is located within Wisconsin's 29th Senate district, along with the 85th and 86th Assembly districts.

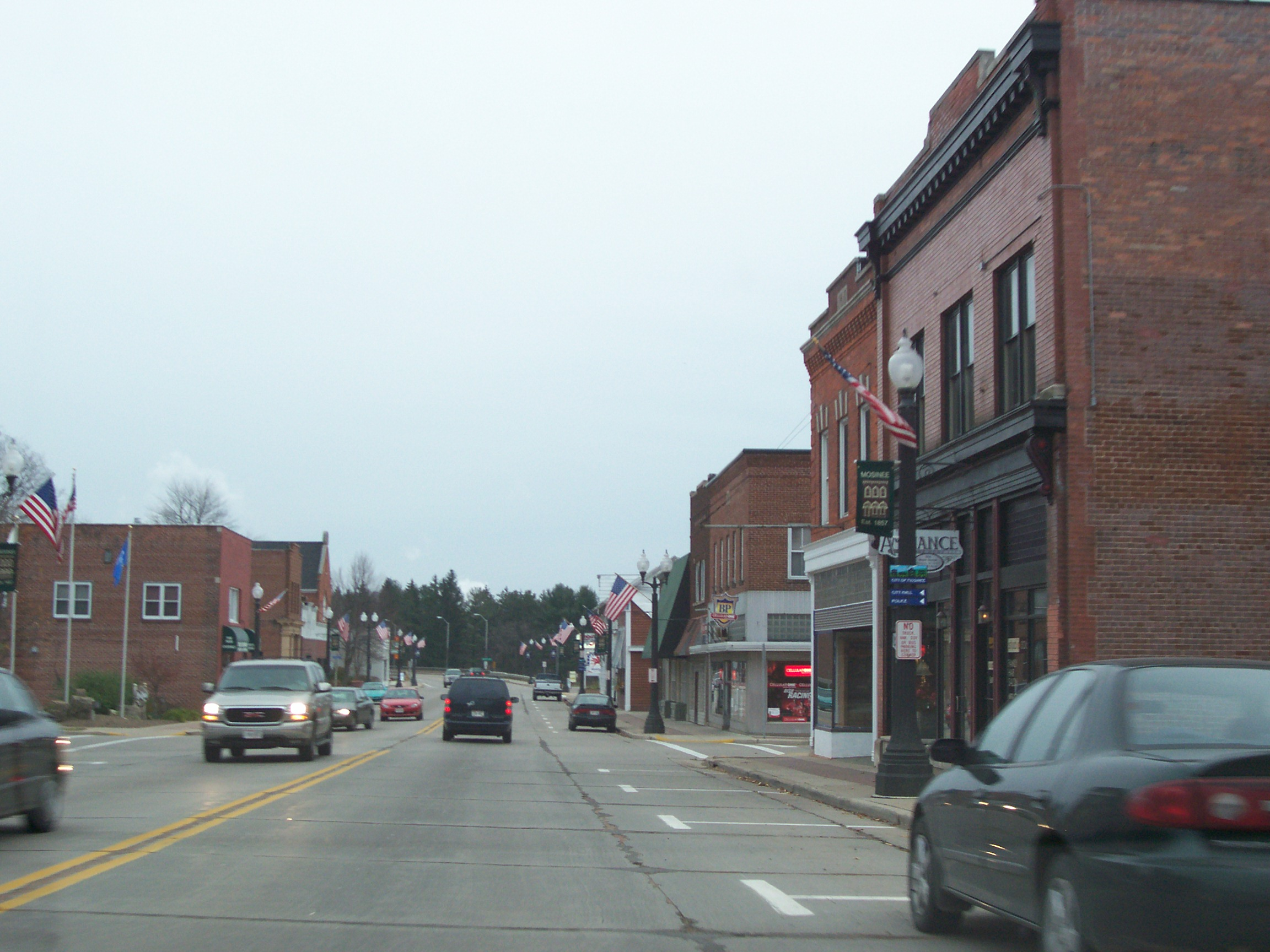
Downtown Mosinee

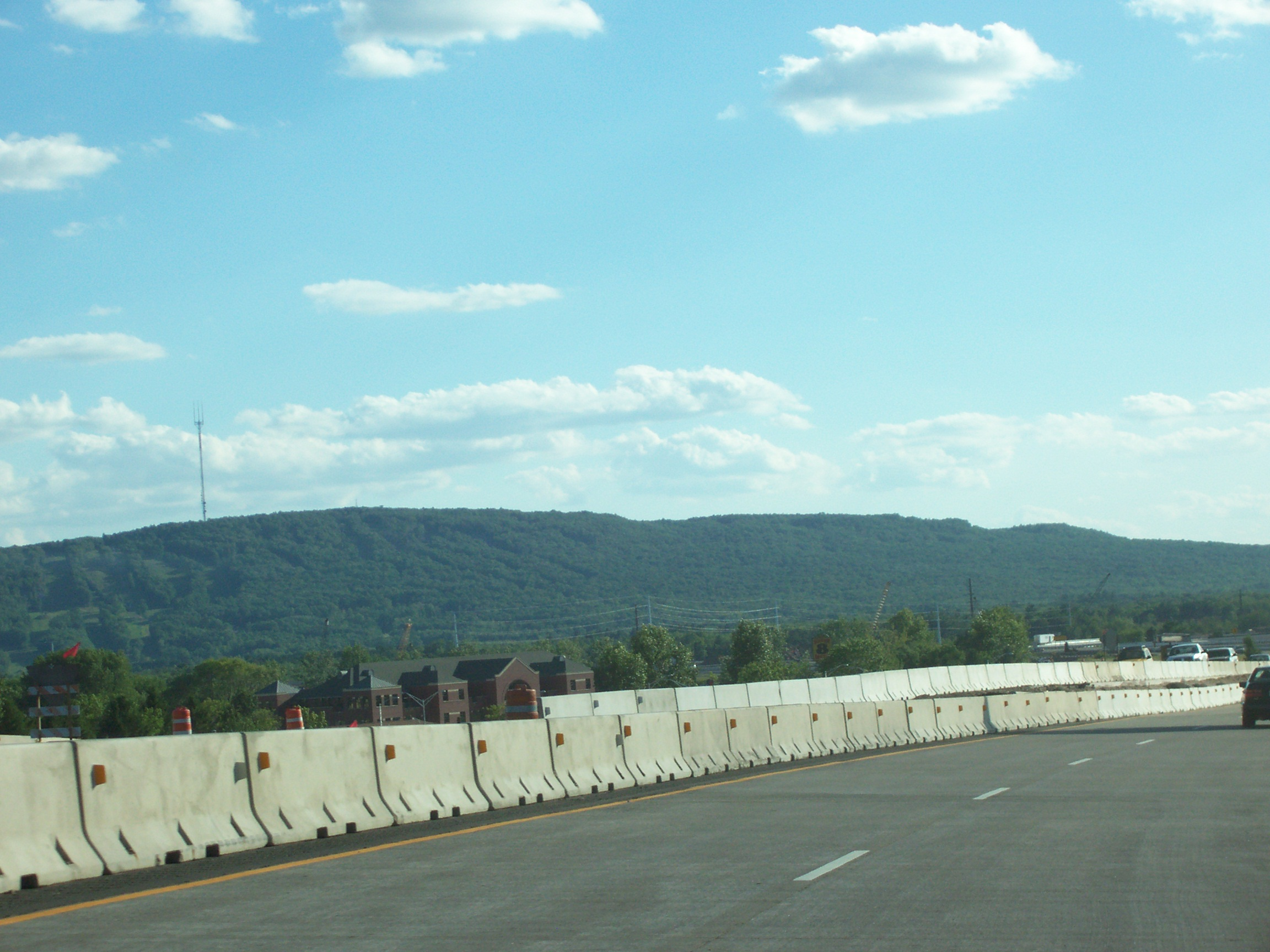
Rib Mountain State Park

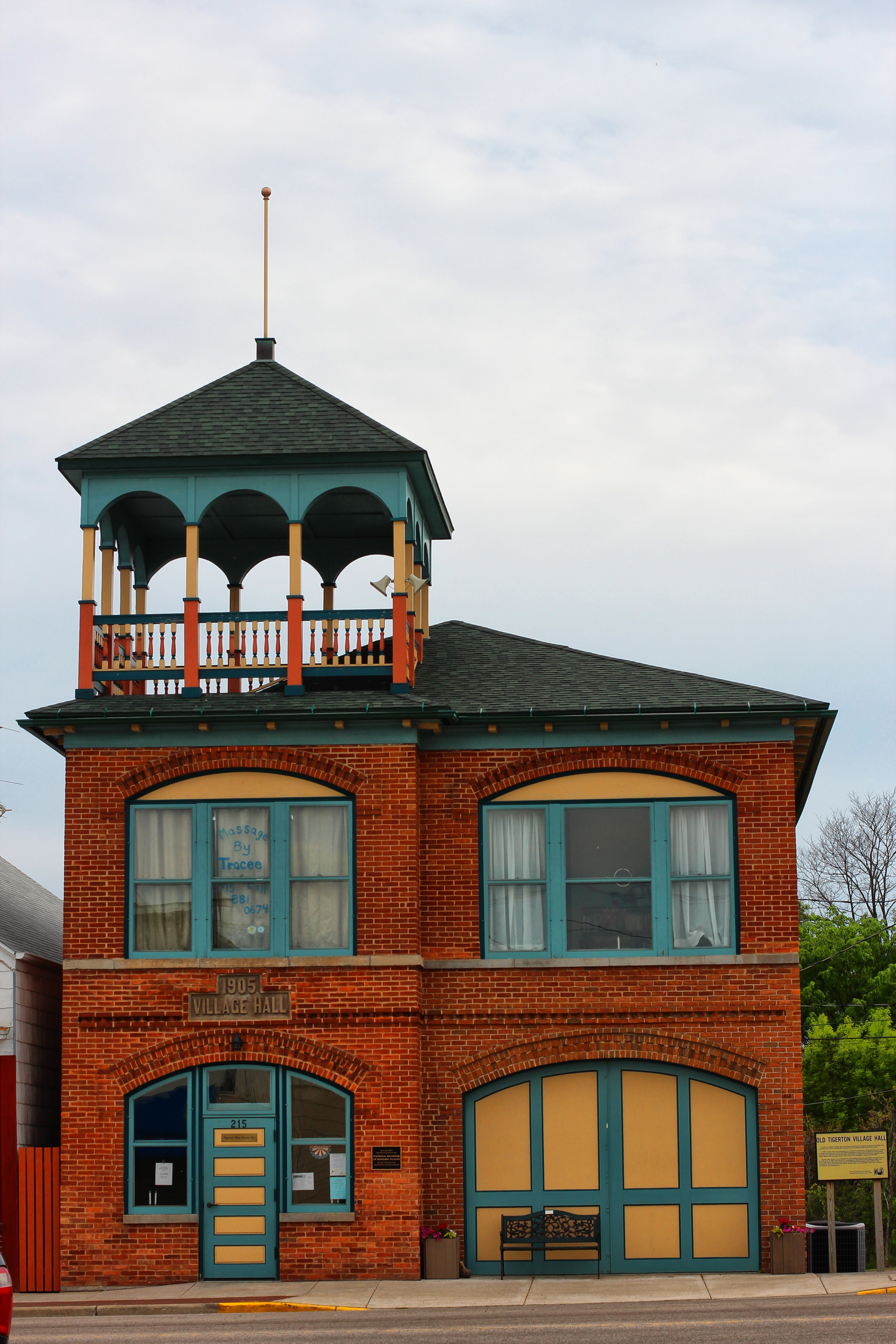
Tigerton village hall

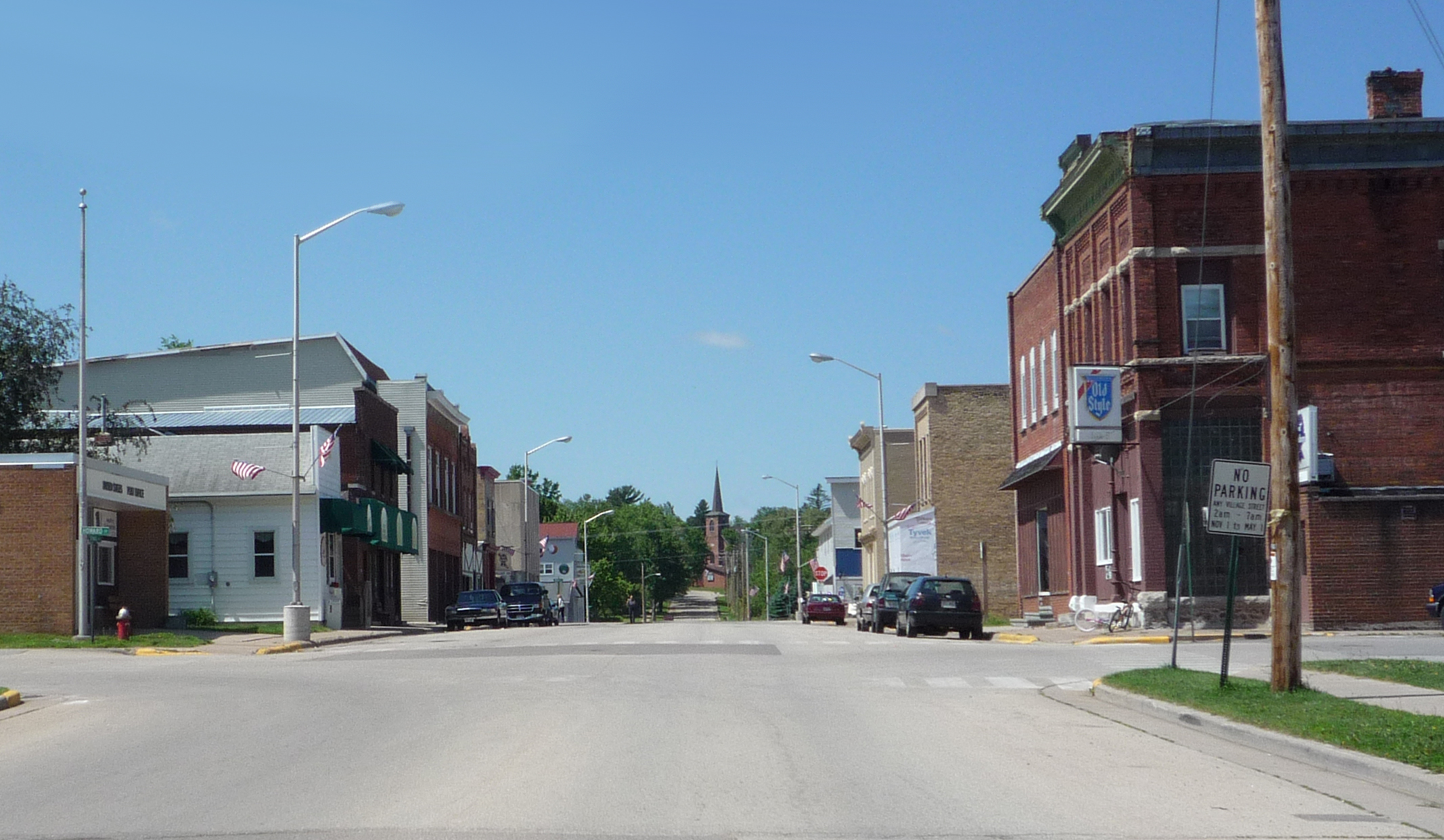
Wittenberg, Wisconsin

== List of past representatives ==
List of representatives to the Wisconsin State Assembly from the 87th district
Member	Party	Residence	Counties represented	Term start	Term end	Ref.
District created
Herbert J. Grover	Dem.	Shawano	Langlade, Menominee, Oconto, Shawano	January 1, 1973	July 16, 1974	
--Vacant--			Langlade, Menominee, Oconto, Shawano	July 16, 1974	January 6, 1975	
Earl W. Schmidt	Rep.	Birnamwood	Langlade, Menominee, Oconto, Shawano	January 6, 1975	January 3, 1983	
Tommy Thompson	Rep.	Elroy	Adams, Juneau, Marquette, Waushara	January 3, 1983	January 7, 1985	
Robert J. Larson	Rep.	Medford	Barron, Chippewa, Price, Rusk, Taylor	January 7, 1985	January 7, 1991	
Martin L. Reynolds	Dem.	Ladysmith	Barron, Chippewa, Price, Rusk, Taylor	January 7, 1991	January 6, 2003	
Martin L. Reynolds	Dem.	Ladysmith	Price, Rusk, Taylor	January 7, 1991	January 6, 2003	
Mary Williams	Rep.	Medford	Marathon, Price, Sawyer, Rusk, Taylor	January 6, 2003	January 5, 2015	
Mary Williams	Rep.	Medford	Clark, Marathon, Sawyer, Rusk, Taylor	January 6, 2003	January 5, 2015	
James W. Edming	Rep.	Glen Flora	Clark, Marathon, Sawyer, Rusk, Taylor	January 5, 2015	January 6, 2025	
Brent Jacobson	Rep.	Mosinee	Marathon, Portage, Shawano, Waupaca	January 6, 2025	Current	
