= Red Valley =

Red Valley may refer to:

== Places ==
- Red Valley, Arizona
  - Red Valley/Cove High School, a high school in Red Valley, Arizona
- Red Valley, Libya
- Red Valley, New Jersey
- Red Valley (South Dakota)

== Arts, entertainment, and media ==
=== Film ===
- Red River Valley (1936 film), a 1936 American film directed by B. Reeves Eason
- Red River Valley (1941 film), a 1941 Western film directed by Joseph Kane
- Red River Valley (1997 film), a 1997 film directed by Feng Xiaoning a

=== Music ===
- Red River Valley (album), a 1977 album by American Slim Whitman.
- Red River Valley (song), an American folk song and cowboy music standard

=== Other media ===
- Red Valley (podcast), a British audio drama

== See also ==
- Red River Valley (disambiguation)
- Red Hill Valley, a valley in Hamilton, Ontario, Canada
- Red River Valley, a region in central North America
