= James Groppi =

American priest (1930–1985)

The Reverend James Groppi
- Born: James Edmund Groppi; November 16, 1930; Milwaukee, Wisconsin, U.S.
- Died: November 4, 1985 (aged 54); Milwaukee, Wisconsin, U.S.
- Occupations: civil rights activist, community organizer, priest
- Spouse: Margaret Rozga

James Edmund Groppi (November 16, 1930 – November 4, 1985) was an American Catholic former priest and noted civil rights activist in Milwaukee, Wisconsin. He became well known for leading numerous protests, many times being arrested during them. Groppi resigned as a priest in 1976. In 1985, he died of brain cancer at the age of 54.

== Early years, education, ordination as priest ==
James Groppi was born in the Bay View neighborhood on the south side of Milwaukee, Wisconsin to Italian immigrant parents. Giocondo and Giorgina Groppi had twelve children, of which James was the eleventh. In this working-class community, Giocondo joined others from Italy in Milwaukee's grocery business, opening "Groppi's" store in Bay View, where James and his siblings worked. Typical of boys in heavily Catholic south side Milwaukee, James attended a parochial grade school (Immaculate Conception), but went on to the public high school in Bay View, where he was captain of the basketball team in his senior year.

A year after graduation, James Groppi enrolled at St. Lawrence Seminary (1950–1952) in Mount Calvary, Wisconsin. According to writer Frank Aukofer, "It was during his seminary years that Father Groppi began developing an empathy with the Black poor. He worked summers at a youth center in Milwaukee's inner core. It was there that he saw the social suffering and ostracism that Negroes lived with every day". Groppi was ordained to the priesthood in June 1959 after studying at St. Francis Seminary (1952–1959).

== Civil rights activism ==
At first assigned to St. Veronica's Church in Milwaukee, in 1963 Groppi was transferred to St. Boniface, the latter parish having a predominantly African-American congregation. Groppi became interested in – and active in – the cause of civil rights for Africans-Americans, participating in the 1963 March on Washington and the Selma to Montgomery marches in 1965 on behalf of the Voting Rights Act. He also participated in the Southern Christian Leadership Conference voter registration project in the South, led by Martin Luther King Jr., during the summer of 1965.

Later in 1965, Groppi returned to Milwaukee, becoming the advisor to the Milwaukee chapter of the National Association for the Advancement of Colored People (NAACP) Youth Council, organizing protests against the segregation of Milwaukee public schools. He served as advisor to the Milwaukee NAACP Youth Council until 1968. He also became second vice president of Milwaukee United School Integration Committee (1965–1966).

== Civil rights leader ==
In his capacity as NAACP advisor, Groppi organized an all-Black male group called the Milwaukee Commandos. They were formed to protect marchers and help quell violence during the "Freedom Marches." With the NAACP Youth Council, Groppi mounted a lengthy, continuous demonstration against the city of Milwaukee on behalf of fair housing. He led these fair housing marches across the 16th Street Viaduct (since renamed in his honor) spanning the Menomonee River Valley. The half-mile wide valley was considered to be a symbolic divide for the city. Throughout this period, he received both physical and moral support from human rights activists like Dick Gregory and Martin Luther King Jr. Though Groppi was denigrated and arrested on numerous occasions for standing firm in his beliefs, he was instrumental in dramatizing the segregated housing situation in Milwaukee. These efforts led to enactment of an open-housing law in the city.

James E. Groppi Unity Bridge.

In 1966 Groppi acted on common knowledge in the Milwaukee area that most judges and elected officials belonged to the Fraternal Order of Eagles, which at the time did not admit people of color to its membership. He questioned how a judge who was a member of an organization that did not welcome African-Americans as members could rule impartially in cases involving African-Americans. He organized pickets at the homes of some of the member judges, most notably Circuit Court Judge Robert Cannon, despite the fact that Cannon was a liberal and had voiced opposition to the Eagles' membership policies. These demonstrations continued, on and off, until 1967. During this period, Groppi also worked for passage of legislation which would outlaw discrimination in the buying and renting of homes (in 1968 such a law was passed on the federal level, known as the Fair Housing Act).

In 1968 Groppi was awarded the Pacem in Terris Peace and Freedom Award by the Davenport Catholic Interracial Council. It was named after a 1963 encyclical by Pope John XXIII that called upon people of good will to secure peace among all nations. Pacem in terris is Latin for "Peace on earth".

On September 29, 1969, Groppi organized and led the "Welfare Mothers' March on Madison," during which over 1,000 welfare mothers marched into Wisconsin's State Assembly chamber, seizing it in protest against planned welfare cuts. Groppi and his supporters held the State Assembly chamber in a sitdown strike for 11 hours before police recovered the chamber. Cited in a bill of attainder for "contempt of the State Assembly" and sentenced to six months in jail, Groppi appealed to the federal courts, which quickly reversed his conviction. His last appeal was to the U.S. Supreme Court, which in Groppi v. Leslie invalidated the contempt citation on notice and due process grounds.

== Later years and death ==
Groppi's ecclesiastical superiors did not always approve of his activities and transferred him to St. Michael's Church in 1970. Groppi repeatedly requested to be assigned to a parish in the African-American community, several of which were opened in the archdiocese during his priesthood, but he was consistently rebuffed. Groppi eventually resigned from the priesthood in 1976 and began studies at Antioch School of Law.

Groppi later married Margaret Rozga, who became an English professor at the University of Wisconsin–Waukesha. They had three children together.

From 1975 to 1976, Groppi worked for the Tri-County Voluntary Service Committee, where he was responsible for recruiting and supervising VISTA volunteers in Racine, Kenosha and Walworth counties. He rose again to public attention when he joined Marlon Brando to mediate the clash between the Menominee Indians and the Alexian Brothers at the Alexian Novitiate in Gresham, Wisconsin, in 1975. The Menominee wanted to reclaim the land on which the Novitiate is located.

Groppi attended the Virginia Theological Seminary (Episcopal) in Alexandria, Virginia, during the fall of 1978. In January 1979, he continued preparations for the Episcopal priesthood by working for St. Andrews Church, an inner-city parish in Detroit, Michigan. However, his lifelong commitment to Catholicism caused him to question whether it was spiritually possible for him to continue conversion to the Episcopal priesthood, and he aborted that pursuit later that year.

In 1977, Groppi became a bus driver for the Milwaukee County Transit System. In 1983 he was elected president of the bus drivers' local union, ATU 998. In 1984, he became partially paralyzed following an unsuccessful surgery that aimed to remove a cancerous brain tumor. He died the following year due to complications of the same cancer.

His papers are maintained at the University of Wisconsin–Milwaukee.

== See also ==
- Philip Berrigan

== Sources ==
- Aukofer, Frank A. City With a Chance. Bruce Publishing Co., Milwaukee. 1968
- Jones, Patrick. "'Not a Color But an Attitude': Fr. James Groppi and Black Power Politics in Milwaukee," in Groundwork: Local Black Freedom Movements, edited by Jeanne Theoharris and Komozi Woodard (New York: NYU Press, 2005)
- Jones, Patrick. The Selma of the North: Civil Rights Insurgency in Milwaukee (Cambridge, MA: Harvard University Press, 2009)
