= Richmond, Wisconsin =

Richmond is the name of some places in the U.S. state of Wisconsin:

- Richmond, Shawano County, Wisconsin, a town
- Richmond, St. Croix County, Wisconsin, a town
- Richmond, Walworth County, Wisconsin, a town
- Richmond (community), Wisconsin, an unincorporated community
