= Red River, Wisconsin =

Red River, Wisconsin may refer to:

- Red River, Kewaunee County, Wisconsin, a town in the United States
- Red River, Shawano County, Wisconsin, an unincorporated community in the United States
