= Red River campaign order of battle =

The order of battle for the Red River campaign includes:

- Red River campaign order of battle: Confederate
- Red River campaign order of battle: Union

== See also ==
- Red River Expedition (disambiguation)
