= Ipiranga =

Ipiranga may refer to:

== Places ==
=== São Paulo ===
- Ipiranga Brook, a Brazilian brook in the vicinity of São Paulo, from which the borough of Ipiranga derives its name
- Subprefecture of Ipiranga, São Paulo
- Ipiranga (district of São Paulo)
- Museu Paulista, popularly known as Museu do Ipiranga

=== Paraná ===
- Ipiranga, Paraná, a city in the Paraná state of Brazil
- Ipiranga River (Paraná)
- the Ipiranga meteorite of 1972, which fell in Paraná, Brazil (see meteorite falls)

=== Elsewhere in Brazil ===
- Ipiranga de Goiás, a municipality in Goiás
- Ipiranga do Sul, a municipality in Rio Grande do Sul
- Ipiranga do Piauí, a municipality in Piauí
- Ipiranga do Norte, a municipality in Mato Grosso
- Ipiranga Airport, an airport in Santo Antônio do Içá, Amazonas

== Other ==
- The Cry of Ipiranga, the declaration of independence of Brazil by Prince Pedro in São Paulo on 7 September 1822
- Petróleo Ipiranga, a Brazilian conglomerate involved in the refining and distribution of oil

== See also ==
- Ipiranga River (disambiguation)
