= Alexian Brothers' Novitiate =

Abandoned manor house in Gresham, Wisconsin, USA

Coordinates: 44°50′44″N 88°44′07″W

The Alexian Brothers' Novitiate is a manor house located in Gresham, Shawano County, Wisconsin, United States. Originally built in 1939 as a residence, it would be converted into a novitiate for the Alexian Brothers' order in 1950 after being donated to them. The building ceased to be used as a novitiate after 1968, following the Second Vatican Council and the reforms from it. It has since been largely vacated and partially demolished, leaving very little of it standing. The building is best known for being seized by the Menominee Warrior Society, in 1975, with demands that it be turned over to the nearby Menominee Indian Reservation. Though successful, it ultimately was returned to Gresham, where it would fall into disrepair and be largely forgotten.

== Early history ==
The Novitiate was originally a home for New York widow, Jennie Peters and her disabled child in 1939. Mrs. Peters was wife to Frank M. Peters, an inventor and former executive of the National Biscuit Company. The home was a Georgian style mansion with a two-story stone portico, large windows, thirty-five rooms, servants' quarters, and a second story balcony overlooking Freeborn Falls on the Red River. Her daughter would not live to see the home completed. The structure had been built with the intention that it eventually be donated to the Brothers, as Frank Peters had formed a strong connection to them in his youth in Chicago.

In 1948, Mrs. Peters returned to New York and the building was turned over to the Brothers, with the final acquisition occurring in 1950 and in 1951 would begin admitting novices. The area encompassed approximately 232 acres. This building was expanded in 1954 to include new dormitories, a cloister, chapel, and other facilities. More land was also purchased in 1955, to provide a farm to feed the novices. Further updates to the property were made so that the novitiate would become self-sufficient.

Following the reforms of the Second Vatican Council, the Brothers ultimately decided to move their operations to Chicago, putting the novitiate building up for sale in 1969, with the last brothers moving out in 1972, with only a caretaker staying behind. Attempts to sell the property stalled for several years, until 1974, when the property was offered to a group of Native Americans from Green Bay for an unknown "nominal cost" with the intent of converting it into an alcohol rehabilitation center. However, the seizure of the Novitiate in 1975 ended this potential deal.

== Seizure of the Novitiate ==
On January 1, 1975, an armed group from the Menominee Tribe, called the Menominee Warrior Society, seized the property and took the caretaker and his family hostage. The independent group was inspired by similar takeovers done by the American Indian Movement (AIM) at Alcatraz and Wounded Knee. They demanded that the Novitiate and property be turned over to the Menominee Reservation, claiming that federal law allowed them to retake the land once it was no longer used for religious purposes. Tensions ran high as shots were occasionally exchanged and negotiations largely stalled. Three days into the standoff, the warriors attempted to negotiate a ceasefire, as they had secretly run out of ammo. However, no deal was reached. Local law enforcement cut off power to the novitiate, which resulted in pipes freezing, causing extensive damage to the property. The National Guard moved into the area and sealed it off behind several checkpoints. Negotiations went nowhere in January, as the Brothers refused to hand over the deed except for a reasonable price and the Menominee Warrior Society demanded it be turned over free, as they felt it already belonged to them. Complicating this further, some people in Menominee, Gresham and the nearby city of Shawano sympathized with the Society and others didn't wish for the National Guard to be there. Vigilante activity was common, as groups of armed locals would access the property on snowmobiles to fire on the novitiate. The surrounding woods and riverside allowed for both vigilantes and members of the warriors society to bypass the guard units, making security a difficult task .

Although they were not involved with the planning of the takeover, several AIM leaders travelled to the Gresham to offer support and help with negotiations. The presence of AIM also brought the actor and Native American rights advocate, Marlon Brando, to the scene to support the Warriors Society. The arrival of outside supporters upset many of the locals who feared the seizure would launch a larger movement in the region.

On February 2, 1975, the standoff ended with a deal between the Brothers and the Society. Fearing that the incident would end like similar situations at Kent State and Attica Prison, the Brothers instead chose to sell the property to the Menominee Reservation for one dollar. The standoff ended and the 39 members of the Menominee Warrior Society were arrested. The month-long standoff resulted in no fatalities or major injuries.

== Recent history ==
Since the standoff, the Novitiate has struggled to find a purpose in the area. The Menominee Reservation was unable to maintain the building and surrendered their claim to the property within a few months. In October 1975, a fire severely damaged the building. In November, the Brothers turned the area over to Crossroads Academy, based out of Milwaukee. The land was divided up, with 56 acres given to the Town of Richmond, to be turned into a park. The additions made by the Alexian Brothers were demolished in 2004, leaving only the original mansion. The old mansion remains a popular sight for kayakers along the Red River. The rapids the mansion overlooks have become known to many as Monastery Falls, in reference to the novitiate. The property has changed hands many times, though no substantive improvements have occurred.

== Documentaries and book ==
In 2001, former Alexian Brother novice J. Patrick Rick created a short documentary film called The Novitiate about the property and 1975 takeover, followed by a book called The Abbey & Me in 2011.

The 1975 takeover of the Novitiate was also featured in Episode 2 of Vow of Silence: The Assassination of Annie Mae (2024), a 4-episode television series directed and produced by Yvonne Russo.
