= Theodore Abrahamson =

Member of the Wisconsin State Assembly

Member of the Wisconsin State Assembly from the Menominee–Shawano district
- In office January 5, 1959 – January 4, 1965
- Preceded by: Robert G. Marotz (Shawano)
- Succeeded by: Herbert J. Grover

Personal details
- Born: June 24, 1900 Lyngdal Municipality, Sweden-Norway
- Died: October 21, 1978 (aged 78) Wittenberg, Wisconsin, U.S.
- Party: Republican
- Spouse: Sevrina Abrahamson
- Children: 3
- Occupation: Dairy farmer Businessman; Politician

Theodore Abrahamson (June 24, 1900 – October 21, 1978) was a Norwegian American immigrant, dairy farmer, businessman, and Republican politician. He was a member of the Wisconsin State Assembly and mayor of Tigerton, Wisconsin.

== Biography ==
Abrahamson was born in Lyngdal Municipality, Norway, and received his early education in Norway. After immigrating to the United States, he attended evening school and worked as a dairy farmer. He owned two feed elevators and was the founder and owner of a milk house company.

== Career ==
Abrahamson was president of Tigerton, Wisconsin from 1948 to 1964, and was a member of the Shawano County, Wisconsin Board from 1936 to 1939 and from 1956 to 1964. Abrahamson was elected to the State Assembly in 1958 and re-elected in 1960 and 1962. He represented Menominee and Shawano counties.

== Personal life ==
Abrahamson and his wife Sevrina (née Eikaas, 1893–1983) had two sons and a daughter; Lennert Abrahamson, Harvin Abrahamson, and Sylvia Abrahamson. They resided in Tigerton, Wisconsin.
