= Benjamin A. Cady =

American politician (1840–1920)

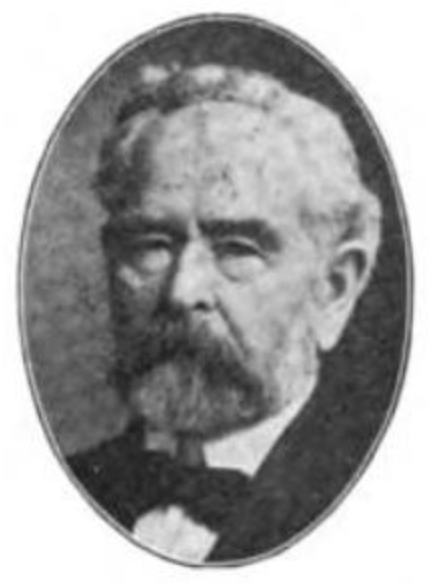

Member of the Wisconsin State Assembly
- In office 1908–1910
- Constituency: Shawano County

Personal details
- Born: Benjamin Adelbert Cady; April 11, 1840 Granville, Vermont, U.S.
- Died: November 27, 1920 (aged 80) Birnamwood, Wisconsin, U.S.
- Party: Republican
- Occupation: Lawyer, politician

Benjamin Adelbert Cady (April 11, 1840 – November 27, 1920) was a politician and lawyer.

Born in Granville, Vermont, Cady moved with his parents to Waukesha County, Wisconsin in 1850. He went to Berlin High School in Berlin, Wisconsin and to Milton College. Cady taught school and then served with the 37th Wisconsin Volunteer Infantry Regiment of the Union Army during the American Civil War. He then studied law and was admitted to the Wisconsin bar in 1867 in Waushara County, Wisconsin and lived in Poy Sippi, Wisconsin. Cady served as Waushara County district attorney, on the town board and was chairman of the town board, and on the Waushara County board. He was also in the mercantile, insurance, real estate, and lumber businesses. In 1883, Cady moved to Birnamwood, Shawano County, Wisconsin. He also served as Shawano County district attorney and on the Shawano County Board of Supervisors. In 1909, Cady served in the Wisconsin State Assembly and was a Republican. He also served on the board of education. Cady died at his home in Birnamwood, Wisconsin.
