= Herbert J. Grover =

American educator and politician

23rd Superintendent of Public Instruction of Wisconsin
- In office July 6, 1981 – April 9, 1993
- Governor: Lee S. Dreyfus; Tony Earl; Tommy Thompson
- Preceded by: Barbara Thompson
- Succeeded by: Lee S. Dreyfus (interim); John T. Benson (elected)

President of the University of Wisconsin Board of Regents
- In office June 8, 1979 – September 5, 1980
- Preceded by: Edward E. Hales
- Succeeded by: Joyce M. Erman

Member of the Wisconsin State Assembly
- In office January 1, 1973 – January 6, 1975
- Preceded by: District established
- Succeeded by: Earl W. Schmidt
- Constituency: 87th district
- In office January 4, 1965 – January 1, 1973
- Preceded by: Theodore Abrahamson
- Succeeded by: District abolished
- Constituency: Menominee–Shawano district

Personal details
- Born: February 5, 1937 (age 89) Fond du Lac, Wisconsin, U.S.
- Spouse: Caroline
- Children: 8
- Education: St. Norbert College (B.A.); American University (M.A.); University of Wisconsin–Madison (Ph.D.)

Herbert J. "Bert" Grover (born February 5, 1937) is a retired American educator and Democratic politician. He was the 23rd Superintendent of Public Instruction of Wisconsin, serving nearly 12 years (1981–1993). Earlier in his career, he was a member of the Wisconsin State Assembly, representing Menominee and Shawano counties.

== Early life and career ==
Born in Fond du Lac, Wisconsin, Grover graduated from Shawano High School. He earned his bachelor's degree from St. Norbert College in De Pere, Wisconsin, in 1959. He went to work as a legislative assistant to United States Senator William Proxmire in Washington, D.C., and, while there continued his education at American University, where he received his master's degree in international law in 1963.

== Wisconsin Assembly years ==
He returned to Wisconsin to work on a Ph.D. in political science at the University of Wisconsin–Madison, but paused his education to run for Wisconsin State Assembly in 1964. Running as a first-time candidate Democrat in the heavily-Republican Menominee–Shawano district, he was considered a long-shot against incumbent Theodore Abrahamson, a power broker in Shawano County for over two decades. Inspired by the campaign tactics of Senator Proxmire, Grover canvassed thousands of farms in the district, covering over 17,000 miles during the campaign. He made a bid for cross-over Republican votes with the slogan "cross over to Grover" and won Shawano County while outperforming President Lyndon B. Johnson in the presidential election that year. Overall, he won 54% of the vote in 1964, went on to win three more elections in the district, and won a fifth term representing the 87th Assembly district, which was drawn to replace most of the territory of his former Menominee–Shawano district in the 1972 redistricting plan.

He served on the Assembly Education Committee throughout his tenure in office, and was chairman for the 1973–1974 session. Likely the most important contribution of his tenure in the Assembly was helping to shepherd Governor Patrick Lucey's plan to merge the University of Wisconsin System with what had previously been the State University System.

While in the Assembly, he resumed his education, earning his Teaching Certificate from University of Wisconsin–Stevens Point in 1967, and continuing his doctoral work at the University of Wisconsin–Madison, ultimately earning his Ph.D. in educational administration in 1974. He worked as a teacher in the Shawano area between legislative sessions.

He briefly ran for State Superintendent of Public Instruction in 1973, after receiving the endorsement of political committee formed by a group of educators, but withdrew before the election after failing to receive the endorsement of the Wisconsin Education Association Council—the state teachers' union.

== Education service ==
He resigned from the Assembly in July 1974 to accept an appointment as a special assistant to the newly elected State Superintendent, Barbara Thompson. Within a few months, however, he accepted another position as superintendent of Niagara, Wisconsin, public schools, where he served for the next four years. He left Niagara in 1978 to become superintendent of Monona Grove Public Schools—covering Monona, Wisconsin, and neighboring Cottage Grove, in the suburbs of Madison.

In the meantime, in 1976, he had been appointed to the University of Wisconsin Board of Regents by Governor Patrick Lucey. In June 1979 he was elected president of the board by a vote of the regents. He resigned less than two years later, in 1980, to launch a campaign for Superintendent of Public Instruction of Wisconsin, challenging his one-time boss, incumbent Barbara Thompson. Grover had become an outspoken critic of Thompson, who—since the November 1980 election of Ronald Reagan—had taken to publicly campaigning for nomination as United States Secretary of Education. Grover placed first in the 1981 spring nonpartisan primary, in a field that also included former and future Wisconsin Secretary of State Doug La Follette, and prevailed in the spring general election with 55% of the vote over his rival, Thompson. He was reelected twice, in 1985 and 1989, taking a larger share of the vote each time. He announced he would not seek a fourth term in 1993, amid speculation that he would launch a bid for Governor of Wisconsin in 1994. Grover instead accepted a job in the Wisconsin Department of Administration to oversee a new state career program for people who do not attend college, the Office of School to Work Transition.

== Later years ==
After leaving government service, he taught at University of Wisconsin–Green Bay for five years, and went into the tree farming business.

== Personal life and family ==
His brother, Thomas G. Grover, was appointed County Judge for Shawano and Menominee counties by Governor Patrick Lucey in December 1975. He went on to serve over 30 years as a Wisconsin circuit court judge for Shawano and Menominee counties.

Grover and his wife, Caroline, have eight children.

== Electoral history ==
=== Wisconsin Assembly, Menominee–Shawano district (1964–1970) ===
Year	Election	Date	Elected				Defeated				Total	Plurality
1964	General	November 3	Herbert J. Grover	Democratic	7,242	54.14%	Theodore Abrahamson (inc.)	Rep.	6,135	45.86%	13,377	1,107
1966	General	November 8	Herbert J. Grover (inc.)	Democratic	5,734	59.51%	Theodore Abrahamson	Rep.	3,901	40.49%	9,635	1,833
1968	General	November 5	Herbert J. Grover (inc.)	Democratic	8,439	61.79%	Elmer D. Anderson	Rep.	5,219	38.21%	13,658	3,220
1970	General	November 3	Herbert J. Grover (inc.)	Democratic	8,339	72.43%	William H. Cantwell	Rep.	3,174	27.57%	11,513	5,165

=== Wisconsin Assembly, 87th district (1972) ===
Year	Election	Date	Elected				Defeated				Total	Plurality
1972	General	November 7	Herbert J. Grover	Democratic	10,467	85.56%	Albert Reinke Jr.	Amer.	1,767	14.44%	12,234	8,700

=== Wisconsin Superintendent of Public Instruction ===
Wisconsin Superintendent of Public Instruction Election, 1981
Party	Candidate	Votes	%	±%
Nonpartisan Primary, February 17, 1981
Nonpartisan	Herbert J. Grover	125,249	44.03%	
Nonpartisan	Barbara Thompson (incumbent)	89,475	31.45%	
Nonpartisan	Doug La Follette	49,171	17.29%	
Nonpartisan	Grant Douglas Tews	12,347	4.34%	
Nonpartisan	Reinhold Kaebitzsch	8,228	2.89%	
Total votes		284,470	100.0%	
General Election, April 7, 1981
Nonpartisan	Herbert J. Grover	424,794	54.63%	
Nonpartisan	Barbara Thompson (incumbent)	352,820	45.37%	−9.79%
Plurality		71,974	9.26%	-1.08%
Total votes		777,614	100.0%	-3.01%

Wisconsin Superintendent of Public Instruction Election, 1985
Party	Candidate	Votes	%	±%
General Election, April 2, 1985
Nonpartisan	Herbert J. Grover (incumbent)	419,845	75.60%	+20.98%
Nonpartisan	I. W. Poehlman	135,470	24.40%	
Plurality		284,375	51.21%	+41.95%
Total votes		555,315	100.0%	-28.59%

Wisconsin Superintendent of Public Instruction Election, 1989
Party	Candidate	Votes	%	±%
Nonpartisan Primary, February 21, 1989
Nonpartisan	Herbert J. Grover (incumbent)	182,466	73.81%	
Nonpartisan	Arlyn F. Wollenburg	32,828	13.28%	
Nonpartisan	I. W. Poehlman	31,917	12.91%	
Total votes		247,211	100.0%	
General Election, April 4, 1989
Nonpartisan	Herbert J. Grover (incumbent)	616,353	76.78%	+1.17%
Nonpartisan	Arlyn F. Wollenburg	180,496	22.48%	
Nonpartisan	Craig L. Parshall	5,915	0.74%	
Plurality		435,857	54.29%	+3.08%
Total votes		802,764	100.0%	+44.56%

Wisconsin State Assembly
Preceded by Theodore Abrahamson	Member of the Wisconsin State Assembly from the Menominee–Shawano district January 4, 1965 – January 1, 1973	District abolished
New district	Member of the Wisconsin State Assembly from the 87th district January 1, 1973 – January 6, 1975	Succeeded by Earl W. Schmidt
Educational offices
Preceded by Edward E. Hales	President of the University of Wisconsin Board of Regents; June 8, 1979 – September 5, 1980	Succeeded by Joyce M. Erman
Preceded by Barbara Thompson	Superintendent of Public Instruction of Wisconsin; July 6, 1981 – April 9, 1993	Succeeded by Lee S. Dreyfus (interim); John T. Benson (elected)
