= Barbara Thompson (politician) =

22nd Superintendent of Public Instruction of Wisconsin
- In office July 2, 1973 – July 6, 1981
- Preceded by: William C. Kahl
- Succeeded by: Herbert J. Grover

Personal details
- Born: Barbara Ruth Storck; October 15, 1924 McFarland, Wisconsin, U.S.
- Died: September 23, 2010 (aged 85) Bradenton, Florida, U.S.
- Education: University of Wisconsin–Platteville; University of Wisconsin–Madison
- Occupation: Educator

Barbara Thompson (October 15, 1924 – September 23, 2010) was an American educator and the Superintendent of Public Instruction of Wisconsin from 1973 to 1981.

Born in McFarland, Wisconsin, and raised on a dairy and tobacco farm, the former Barbara Ruth Storck graduated from the University of Wisconsin–Platteville in 1956 and received her master's degree and doctorate from the University of Wisconsin–Madison. Initially, Thompson started to teach in a one-room schoolhouse and was a school administrator. She campaigned for the State Superintendent office, while recovering from a broken arm in 1973, and was the first woman to be elected to the office. During her administration, the teachers in Hortonville, Wisconsin, went on strike. Thompson also required teachers in Wisconsin to go through continuing education and to have their teachers licenses renewed once every five years. She died in Bradenton, Florida.
