= Earl W. Schmidt =

20th century American politician and judge (1936–2024)

The Honorable Earl W. Schmidt

Chief Judge of the 9th District of Wisconsin Circuit Courts
- In office August 1, 1992 – July 31, 1998
- Preceded by: Gary L. Carlson
- Succeeded by: James Mohr

Wisconsin Circuit Court Judge for the Shawano–Menominee Circuit, Branch 1
- In office December 24, 1982 – July 31, 2002
- Appointed by: Lee S. Dreyfus
- Preceded by: Michael G. Eberlein
- Succeeded by: James R. Habeck

Member of the Wisconsin State Assembly from the 87th district
- In office January 6, 1975 – December 24, 1982
- Preceded by: Herbert J. Grover
- Succeeded by: Tommy Thompson

District Attorney of Shawano and Menominee Counties
- In office January 1, 1973 – January 6, 1975
- Preceded by: Daniel Aschenbrener
- Succeeded by: Richard J. Stadelman

Personal details
- Born: March 11, 1936 Birnamwood, Wisconsin, U.S.
- Died: July 14, 2024 (aged 88) Birnamwood, Wisconsin, U.S.
- Party: Republican
- Spouse: Judy Eckhardt
- Children: 4
- Education: University of Wisconsin–Madison (B.S., M.S., M.P.A.); University of Wisconsin Law School (J.D.)

Earl William Schmidt (March 11, 1936 – July 14, 2024) was an American lawyer, farmer, politician, and judge. He served nearly 20 years (1982–2002) as a Wisconsin circuit court judge in the Shawano–Menominee circuit, and was chief judge of the 9th district of Wisconsin circuit courts from 1992 through 1998. Earlier in his career, he was a member of the Wisconsin State Assembly, serving four terms as a Republican (1975–1983).

== Biography ==
Born in Birnamwood, Shawano County, Wisconsin, Schmidt graduated from Birnamwood High School. He then attended the University of Wisconsin–Madison, where he received his bachelor's degree in political science in 1962, and continued his education, receiving his master's degree in agricultural economics and public administration in 1964. After receiving his master's degree, he spent five years abroad in Venezuela, the Dominican Republic, and Brazil on program to assist developing nations in building infrastructure. He would later return again to further his education at the University of Wisconsin Law School, receiving his J.D. degree in 1972. He worked his land for 25 years as a farmer and practiced law in Shawano County.

In early public offices, Schmidt served as chairman of the Richmond Town Board. His first job after law school was as an assistant district attorney in Shawano and Menominee counties, and he was elected district attorney for Shawano and Menominee Counties for 1973 and 1974.

Schmidt was elected to the Wisconsin State Assembly as a Republican in 1974, winning the general election by a wide margin after topping a closely contested Republican primary. He was re-elected in 1976, 1978, and 1980. He was defeated seeking re-election in 1982 after a 1981 redistricting plan put him in the same district as Democratic incumbent representative Lloyd H. Kincaid. Immediately after his defeat, however, he expressed his interest in running for the Wisconsin circuit court seat being vacated by the retirement of Judge Michael G. Eberlein. Three weeks later, outgoing Governor Lee S. Dreyfus appointed Schmidt to the judgeship, and he won an election for a full term in April 1984.

In 1992, the Wisconsin Supreme Court appointed Judge Schmidt to serve as chief judge for the 9th judicial administrative district of Wisconsin circuit courts. He was re-appointed in 1994 and 1996, serving the maximum of three two-year terms as chief judge.

Judge Schmidt was re-elected without opposition in 1990 and 1996 and retired at the end of his third full term in 2002. After retirement, however, Schmidt continued to serve as a reserve judge and filled in for several cases in Marathon and Langlade counties.

== Personal life and family ==
Schmidt married Judy Eckhardt of Langlade County in 1975. They had three daughters and one son together. He died at his home in Birnamwood on July 14, 2024, at the age of 88.

== Electoral history ==
=== Wisconsin Assembly (1974, 1976, 1978, 1980) ===
Wisconsin Assembly, 87th District Election, 1974
| Party | Candidate | Votes | % | ±% |
|---|---|---|---|---|
Republican Primary, September 10, 1974
| Republican | Earl W. Schmidt | 1,683 | 45.36% | |
| Republican | Roger L. Utnehmer | 1,329 | 35.82% | |
| Republican | Duane J. Rades | 698 | 18.81% | |
| Plurality | | 354 | 9.54% | |
| Total votes | | 3,710 | 100.0% | |
General Election, November 5, 1974
| Republican | Earl W. Schmidt | 7,560 | 56.55% | |
| Democratic | Joseph E. Jones | 5,522 | 41.31% | −44.25% |
| American | Theresa C. Jacobs | 286 | 2.14% | −12.30% |
| Plurality | | 2,038 | 15.25% | -55.87% |
| Total votes | | 13,368 | 100.0% | |
| Republican gain from Democratic | | | | |

Wisconsin Assembly, 87th District Election, 1976
| Party | Candidate | Votes | % | ±% |
|---|---|---|---|---|
General Election, November 2, 1976
| Republican | Earl W. Schmidt (incumbent) | 13,295 | 69.44% | +12.88% |
| Democratic | Robert F. Christopherson | 5,852 | 30.56% | −10.74% |
| Plurality | | 7,443 | 38.87% | +23.63% |
| Total votes | | 19,147 | 100.0% | +43.23% |
| Republican hold | | | | |

Wisconsin Assembly, 87th District Election, 1978
| Party | Candidate | Votes | % | ±% |
|---|---|---|---|---|
General Election, November 7, 1978
| Republican | Earl W. Schmidt (incumbent) | 11,582 | 74.19% | +4.75% |
| Democratic | Michael J. Ascher | 4,029 | 25.81% | |
| Plurality | | 7,553 | 48.38% | +9.51% |
| Total votes | | 15,611 | 100.0% | -18.47% |
| Republican hold | | | | |

Wisconsin Assembly, 87th District Election, 1980
| Party | Candidate | Votes | % | ±% |
|---|---|---|---|---|
General Election, November 4, 1980
| Republican | Earl W. Schmidt (incumbent) | 15,931 | 78.04% | |
| Democratic | Francis E. Jones | 4,483 | 21.96% | |
| Plurality | | 11,448 | 56.08% | |
| Total votes | | 20,414 | 100.0% | |
| Republican hold | | | | |

=== Wisconsin Assembly (1982) ===
Wisconsin Assembly, 48th District Election, 1982
| Party | Candidate | Votes | % | ±% |
|---|---|---|---|---|
General Election, November 2, 1982
| Democratic | Lloyd H. Kincaid | 8,222 | 50.24% | −16.98% |
| Republican | Earl W. Schmidt | 8,144 | 49.76% | |
| Plurality | | 78 | 0.48% | -33.97% |
| Total votes | | 16,366 | 100.0% | -22.16% |
| Democratic hold | | | | |

=== Wisconsin Circuit Court (1984, 1990, 1996) ===
Wisconsin Circuit Court, Menominee–Shawano Circuit, Branch 1 Election, 1984
| Party | Candidate | Votes | % | ±% |
|---|---|---|---|---|
General Election, April 3, 1984
| Nonpartisan | Earl W. Schmidt (incumbent) | 7,305 | 72.41% | |
| Nonpartisan | Galen Winter | 2,783 | 27.59% | |
| Plurality | | 4,522 | 44.83% | |
| Total votes | | 10,088 | 100.0% | +58.69% |

Wisconsin State Assembly
| Preceded by Herbert J. Grover | Member of the Wisconsin State Assembly from the 87th district January 6, 1975 – December 24, 1982 | Succeeded by Tommy Thompson |
Legal offices
| Preceded by Daniel Aschenbrener | District Attorney of Shawano and Menominee Counties; January 1, 1973 – January 6, 1975 | Succeeded by Richard J. Stadelman |
| Preceded by Daniel Aschenbrener | Wisconsin Circuit Court Judge for the Shawano–Menominee Circuit, Branch 1 December 24, 1982 – July 31, 2002 | Succeeded by Richard J. Stadelman |
| Preceded by Gary L. Carlson | Chief Judge of the 9th District of Wisconsin Circuit Courts; August 1, 1992 – July 31, 1998 | Succeeded by James Mohr |
