= Thornton, Wisconsin =

Census-designated place in Wisconsin, United States

- Census-designated place
- Location within Wisconsin
- Coordinates: 44°47′48″N 88°41′28″W
- Country: United States
- State: Wisconsin
- County: Shawano

Area
  - Total: 0.259 sq mi (0.67 km^{2})
  - Land: 0.259 sq mi (0.67 km^{2})
  - Water: 0 sq mi (0 km^{2})
- Elevation: 853 ft (260 m)

Population (2020)
  - Total: 63
  - Density: 240/sq mi (94/km^{2})
- Time zone: UTC-6 (Central (CST))
  - Summer (DST): UTC-5 (CDT)
- Area codes: 715 & 534
- GNIS feature ID: 1575402

Thornton is a census-designated place in the town of Richmond, Shawano County, Wisconsin, United States. As of the 2020 census, Thornton had a population of 63.

== History ==
The community was named after Thornton, New Hampshire.
