= Colorado River (disambiguation) =

The Colorado River is one of the principal rivers of the southwestern United States and northwest Mexico.

Colorado River may also refer to:

- Colorado River (Argentina)
  - Río Colorado, Río Negro, a village in Argentina
- Colorado River (Potosi), Bolivia
- Colorado River (Rondônia), Brazil
- Colorado River (Aconcagua), Chile
- Colorado River (Costa Rica)
- Colorado River (Tempisque River), Costa Rica
- Colorado River (Texas), United States
