= Tigerton, Wisconsin =

- Village
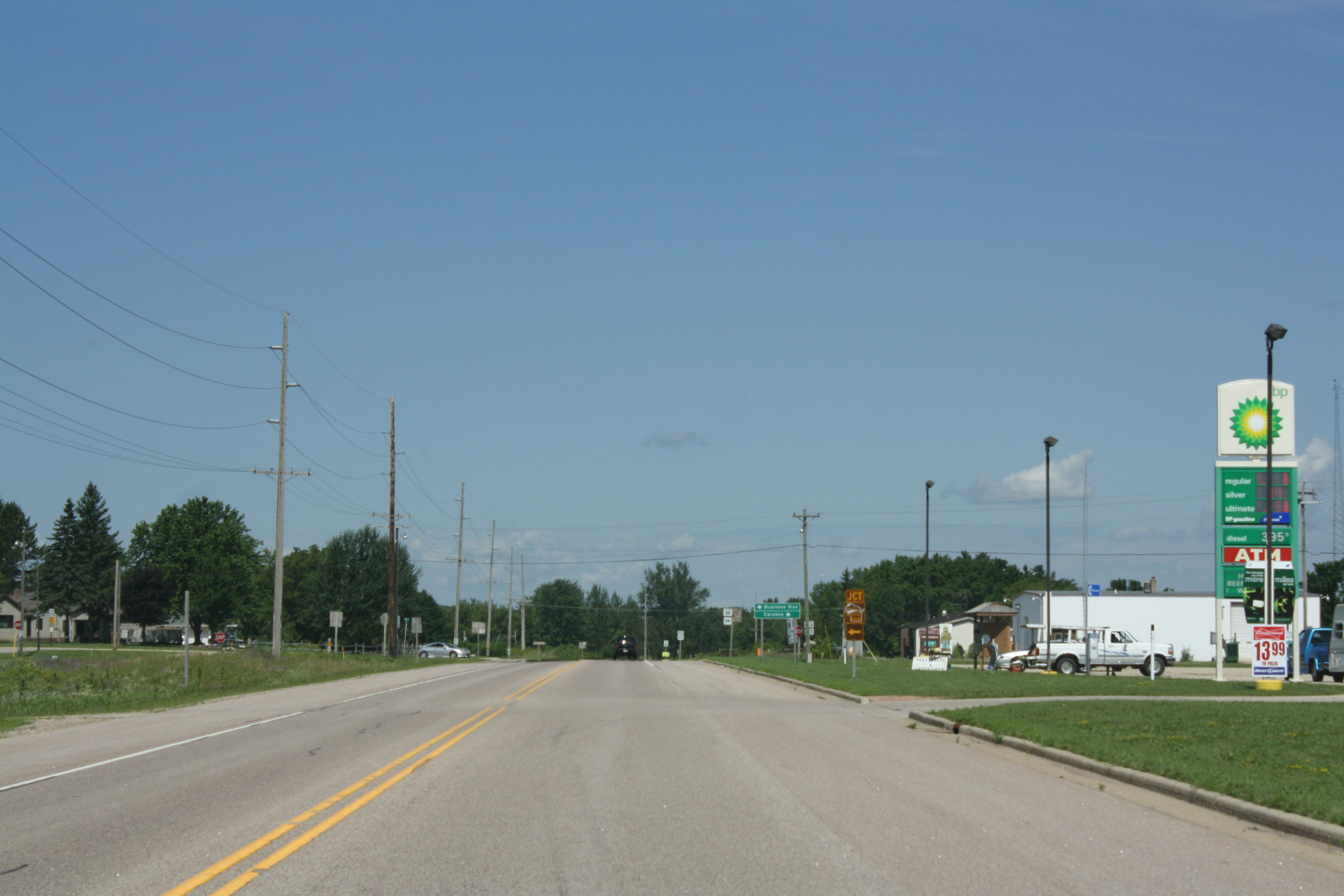
- U.S. Route 45 in Tigerton

- Location of Tigerton in Shawano County, Wisconsin.
- Coordinates: 44°44′25″N 89°3′30″W
- Country: United States
- State: Wisconsin
- County: Shawano

Area
  - Total: 1.85 sq mi (4.79 km^{2})
  - Land: 1.82 sq mi (4.72 km^{2})
  - Water: 0.023 sq mi (0.06 km^{2})
- Elevation: 1,030 ft (314 m)

Population (2020)
  - Total: 708
  - Density: 388/sq mi (150/km^{2})
- Time zone: UTC-6 (Central (CST))
  - Summer (DST): UTC-5 (CDT)
- Area codes: 715 & 534
- FIPS code: 55-79825
- GNIS feature ID: 1575448
- Website: https://www.tigertonwi.com/

Tigerton is a village in Shawano County, Wisconsin, United States. The population was 708 at the 2020 census.

== History ==
The Lake Shore Railroad ran through the area from 1879 to 1981. Established in 1896, the village is named after Tiger Creek. The creek is said to have fast-running waters that roar like a tiger.

In the 1970s and 1980s, Tigerton was the Wisconsin base of the now largely defunct Posse Comitatus, a militant far-right organization whose co-founder James Wickstrom attempted to create a new town in nearby Fairbanks.

== Geography ==
Tigerton is located at 44°44′25″N 89°3′30″W (44.740411, -89.058261).

According to the United States Census Bureau, the village has a total area of 1.82 square miles (4.71 km^{2}), of which 1.79 square miles (4.64 km^{2}) is land and 0.03 square miles (0.08 km^{2}) is water.

== Demographics ==
Historical population
| Census | Pop. | Note | %± |
|---|---|---|---|
| 1900 | 723 | | — |
| 1910 | 728 | | 0.7% |
| 1920 | 748 | | 2.7% |
| 1930 | 831 | | 11.1% |
| 1940 | 794 | | −4.5% |
| 1950 | 827 | | 4.2% |
| 1960 | 781 | | −5.6% |
| 1970 | 742 | | −5.0% |
| 1980 | 865 | | 16.6% |
| 1990 | 815 | | −5.8% |
| 2000 | 764 | | −6.3% |
| 2010 | 741 | | −3.0% |
| 2020 | 708 | | −4.5% |
U.S. Decennial Census

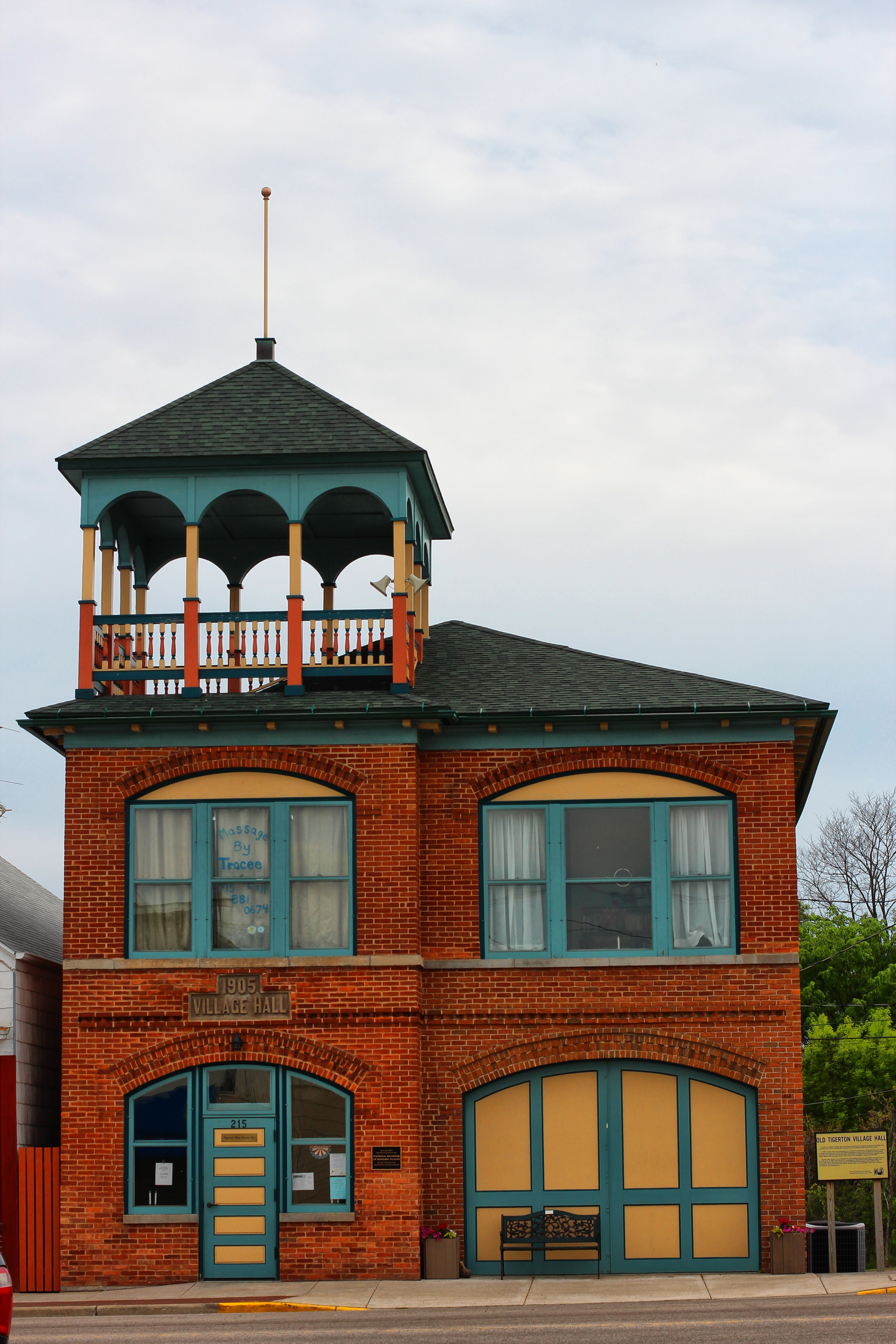
Village Hall

=== 2010 census ===
As of the census of 2010, there were 741 people, 332 households, and 182 families living in the village. The population density was 414.0 inhabitants per square mile (159.8/km^{2}). There were 378 housing units at an average density of 211.2 per square mile (81.5/km^{2}). The racial makeup of the village was 92.3% White, 0.3% African American, 3.2% Native American, 0.3% Asian, 1.5% from other races, and 2.4% from two or more races. Hispanic or Latino of any race were 1.9% of the population.

There were 332 households, of which 25.9% had children under the age of 18 living with them, 39.2% were married couples living together, 9.9% had a female householder with no husband present, 5.7% had a male householder with no wife present, and 45.2% were non-families. 38.0% of all households were made up of individuals, and 19% had someone living alone who was 65 years of age or older. The average household size was 2.23 and the average family size was 2.98.

The median age in the village was 40.2 years. 23.8% of residents were under the age of 18; 7.3% were between the ages of 18 and 24; 23.5% were from 25 to 44; 28.6% were from 45 to 64; and 16.7% were 65 years of age or older. The gender makeup of the village was 48.7% male and 51.3% female.

=== 2000 census ===
As of the census of 2000, there were 764 people, 349 households, and 199 families living in the village. The population density was 540.1 people per square mile (209.2/km^{2}). There were 383 housing units at an average density of 270.7 per square mile (104.9/km^{2}). The racial makeup of the village was 97.12% White, 0.13% African American, 1.96%, Native American, 0.13% Asian, and 0.65% from two or more races. Hispanic or Latino of any race were 1.05% of the population.

There were 349 households, out of which 26.4% had children under the age of 18 living with them, 45.0% were married couples living together, 9.2% had a female householder with no husband present, and 42.7% were non-families. 40.1% of all households were made up of individuals, and 21.5% had someone living alone who was 65 years of age or older. The average household size was 2.19 and the average family size was 2.93.

In the village, the population was spread out, with 23.3% under the age of 18, 6.3% from 18 to 24, 28.1% from 25 to 44, 20.9% from 45 to 64, and 21.3% who were 65 years of age or older. The median age was 40 years. For every 100 females, there were 83.2 males. For every 100 females age 18 and over, there were 83.7 males.

The median income for a household in the village was $25,278, and the median income for a family was $33,625. Males had a median income of $26,250 versus $18,264 for females. The per capita income for the village was $14,707. About 9.4% of families and 15.6% of the population were below the poverty line, including 18.6% of those under age 18 and 13.6% of those age 65 or over.

== Education ==
The village is served by the Tigerton School District. The district has an elementary school, middle school and high school, as well as the Tigerton School Forest and Environmental Center, a hands-on learning environment.

== Notable people ==
- Theodore Abrahamson, Wisconsin State Representative and President of Tigerton from 1948 to 1964
- Joseph H. Hardgrove, Wisconsin State Representative
