= Red River Valley (disambiguation) =

Red River Valley is a region in north central North America that is drained by the Red River of the North.

Red River Valley is also a region in south central North America that is drained by the Red River of the South.

Red River Valley may also refer to:

- "Red River Valley" (song), a folk song and cowboy music standard of controversial origins
- Red River Valley (1936 film), a 1936 American film by B. Reeves Eason
- Red River Valley (1941 film), an American film by Joseph Kane
- Red River Valley (1997 film), a 1997 Chinese film about the British incursion into Tibet
- Red River of the South, a major tributary of the Mississippi and Atchafalaya Rivers
- Red River Valley (album), a 1977 album by Slim Whitman
- Red River Valley (TV show), a 1982 Israeli TV show in which songs from American Westerns were theatrically performed

== See also ==
- Red River (disambiguation)
