= Birnamwood, Wisconsin =

- Village
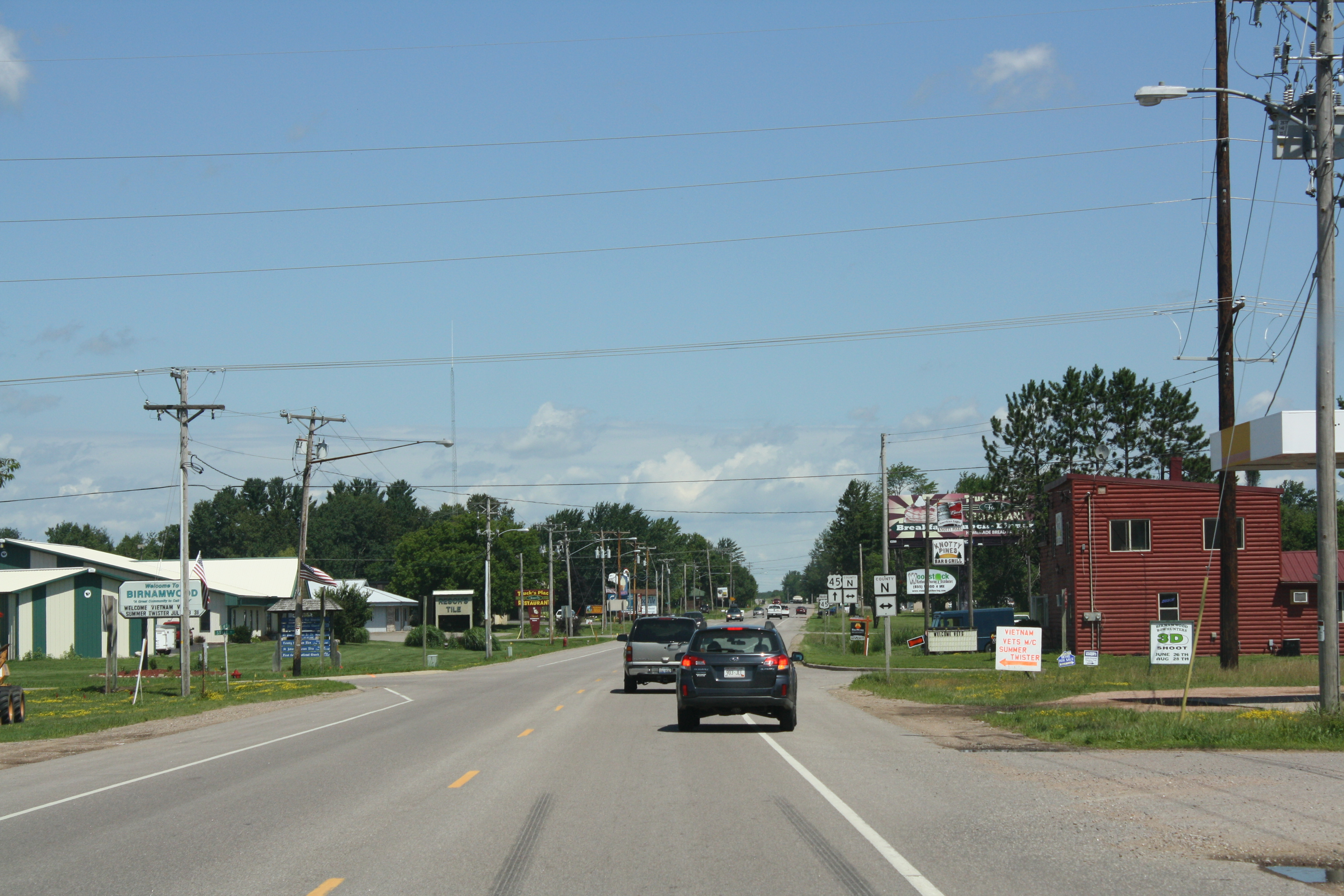
- Looking north at downtown Birnamwood

- Location of Birnamwood in Shawano County, Wisconsin
- Coordinates: 44°55′52″N 89°12′35″W
- Country: United States
- State: Wisconsin
- Counties: Shawano, Marathon

Area
  - Total: 2.20 sq mi (5.70 km^{2})
  - Land: 2.20 sq mi (5.70 km^{2})
  - Water: 0 sq mi (0.00 km^{2})
- Elevation: 1,302 ft (397 m)

Population (2020)
  - Total: 730
  - Density: 330/sq mi (130/km^{2})
- Time zone: UTC-6 (Central (CST))
  - Summer (DST): UTC-5 (CDT)
- Area codes: 715 & 534
- FIPS code: 55-07600
- GNIS feature ID: 1561822
- Website: townofbirnamwood.wi.gov

Birnamwood is a village in Marathon and Shawano counties in the U.S. state of Wisconsin. It is part of the Wausau, Wisconsin Metropolitan Statistical Area. The population was 730 at the 2020 census. Of this, 716 were in Shawano County, and 14 were in Marathon County. The village is located mostly surrounded by the town of Birnamwood in Shawano County; only a small portion extends into the town of Norrie in adjacent Marathon County.

Until the 1990s, Birnamwood was home to the world's largest fiberglass badger.

U.S. Route 45 runs through the village.

== History ==
The village was named for Birnam Wood, a town in Scotland mentioned in Shakespeare's Macbeth.

== Geography ==
Birnamwood is located at 44°55′52″N 89°12′35″W (44.931199, -89.209643). According to the U.S. Census Bureau, the village has a total area of 2.21 square miles (5.72 km^{2}), all land.

== Demographics ==
Historical population
Census	Pop.	Note	%±
1900	475		—
1910	678		42.7%
1920	651		−4.0%
1930	557		−14.4%
1940	556		−0.2%
1950	561		0.9%
1960	568		1.2%
1970	632		11.3%
1980	688		8.9%
1990	693		0.7%
2000	795		14.7%
2010	818		2.9%
2020	730		−10.8%
U.S. Decennial Census

=== 2010 census ===
At the 2010 census there were 818 people, 343 households, and 217 families living in the village. The population density was 370.1 inhabitants per square mile (142.9/km^{2}). There were 383 housing units at an average density of 173.3 units per square mile (66.9 units/km^{2}). The racial makeup of the village was 97.2% White, 0.5% African American, 0.7% Native American, 0.6% from other races, and 1.0% from two or more races. Hispanic or Latino people of any race were 1.8%.

Of the 343 households 30.3% had children under the age of 18 living with them, 47.5% were married couples living together, 9.9% had a female householder with no husband present, 5.8% had a male householder with no wife present, and 36.7% were non-families. 31.8% of households were one person and 18.4% were one person aged 65 or older. The average household size was 2.28 and the average family size was 2.88.

The median age in the village was 41.5 years. 22.6% of residents were under the age of 18; 8.1% were between the ages of 18 and 24; 23.9% were from 25 to 44; 22.6% were from 45 to 64; and 22.6% were 65 or older. The gender makeup of the village was 50.4% male and 49.6% female.

=== 2000 census ===
At the 2000 census there were 795 people, 309 households, and 202 families living in the village. The population density was 360.4 people per square mile (139.2 people/km^{2}). There were 328 housing units at an average density of 148.7 units per square mile (57.4 units/km^{2}). The racial makeup of the village was 97.61% White, 0.13% African American, 0.13% Native American, 1.26% Asian, and 0.88% from two or more races. Hispanic or Latino people of any race were 0.13%.

Of the 309 households 35.6% had children under the age of 18 living with them, 52.1% were married couples living together, 8.7% had a female householder with no husband present, and 34.6% were non-families. 31.4% of households were one person and 16.8% were one person aged 65 or older. The average household size was 2.48 and the average family size was 3.14.

The age distribution was 29.2% under the age of 18, 6.8% from 18 to 24, 25.8% from 25 to 44, 17.5% from 45 to 64, and 20.8% 65 or older. The median age was 37 years. For every 100 females, there were 89.3 males. For every 100 females age 18 and over, there were 82.2 males.

The median household income was $37,813 and the median family income was $47,574. Males had a median income of $32,500 versus $24,688 for females. The per capita income for the village was $17,740. About 5.0% of families and 7.9% of the population were below the poverty line, including 13.2% of those under age 18 and 2.4% of those age 65 or over.

== Notable people ==
- Benjamin A. Cady, lawyer and legislator
- Earl W. Schmidt, farmer, jurist, and legislator

== Images ==
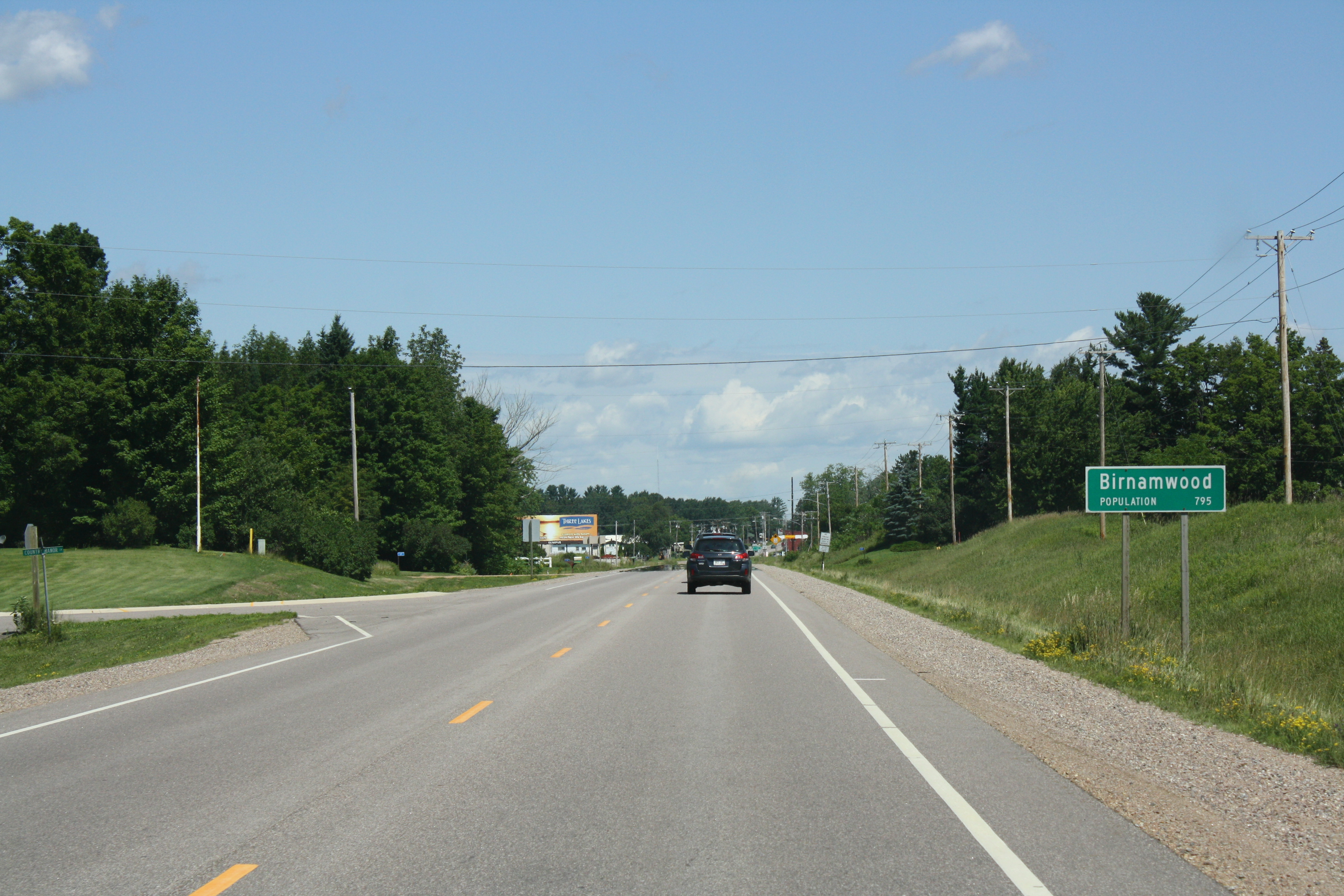
The sign for Birnamwood

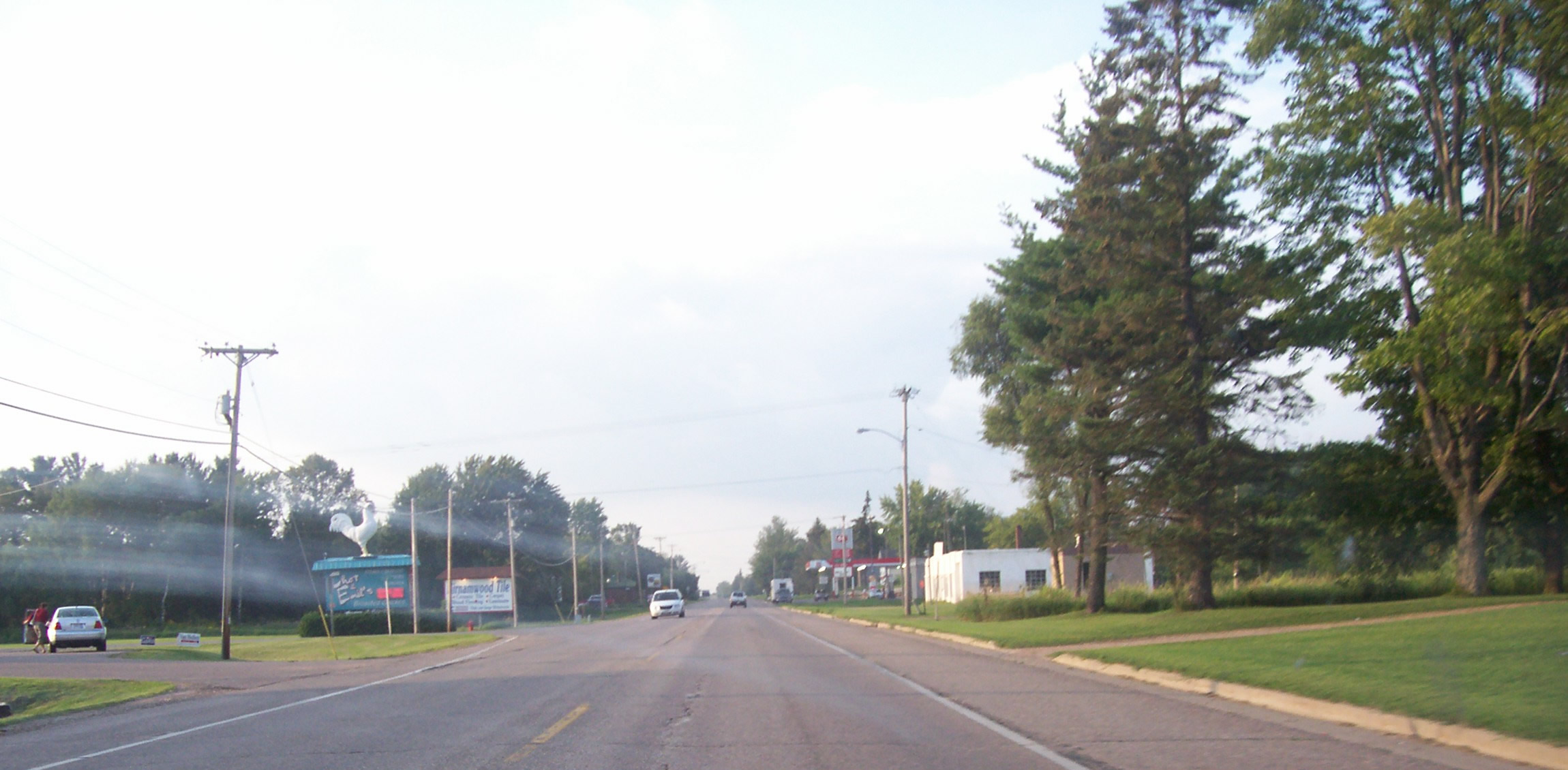
Traveling on U.S. 45 through Birnamwood
