= Red River, Shawano County, Wisconsin =

Red River, Wisconsin
- Unincorporated community
- Location within Wisconsin Location within the United States
- Coordinates: 44°49′30″N 88°42′16″W
- Country: United States
- State: Wisconsin
- County: Shawano
- Elevation: 860 ft (260 m)
- Time zone: UTC-6 (Central (CST))
  - Summer (DST): UTC-5 (CDT)
- Area codes: 715 & 534
- GNIS feature ID: 1572149

Red River is an unincorporated community located in the town of Richmond, Shawano County, Wisconsin, United States. Red River is located along the Red River and County Highway A, 6 miles (9.7 km) west-northwest of Shawano.
