= Red River, Nova Scotia =

Community in Nova Scotia, Canada

Coordinates: 46°50′52.74″N 60°46′1.55″W

Red River in Nova Scotia

Red River is a small community in the Canadian province of Nova Scotia, located in Inverness County on Cape Breton Island. Among the early settlers who received land grants in Red River were Edward Timmons in 1856, Andrew Moore in 1858, and Charles McLean in 1859. They were followed by Alexander Kerr in 1861, Samuel Hingley in 1862, Charles Campbell in 1871, and Peter McIntosh in 1873. In the 1870s, the community had a school and a grist mill.

Red River had a population of 81 people in 1956.
