= Colorado River (Tempisque River tributary) =

River in Costa Rica

Colorado River (Spanish pronunciation: [koloˈɾaðo]) is a river in Costa Rica.
