= Ipiranga River =

There are several rivers named Ipiranga River in Brazil:

- Ipiranga River (Paraná)
- Ipiranga River (São Paulo)
- Ipiranga Brook (São Paulo)
- Ipiranga River (Pará)

== See also ==
- Ipiranga (disambiguation)
