= Red Valley (South Dakota) =

Valley in South Dakota, United States

Coordinates: 44°33′09″N 103°23′06″W

Red Valley or Racetrack is a part of the Black Hills in South Dakota. Red Valley is a depression that rims the entire Black Hills.
