= Gresham, Wisconsin =

- Village
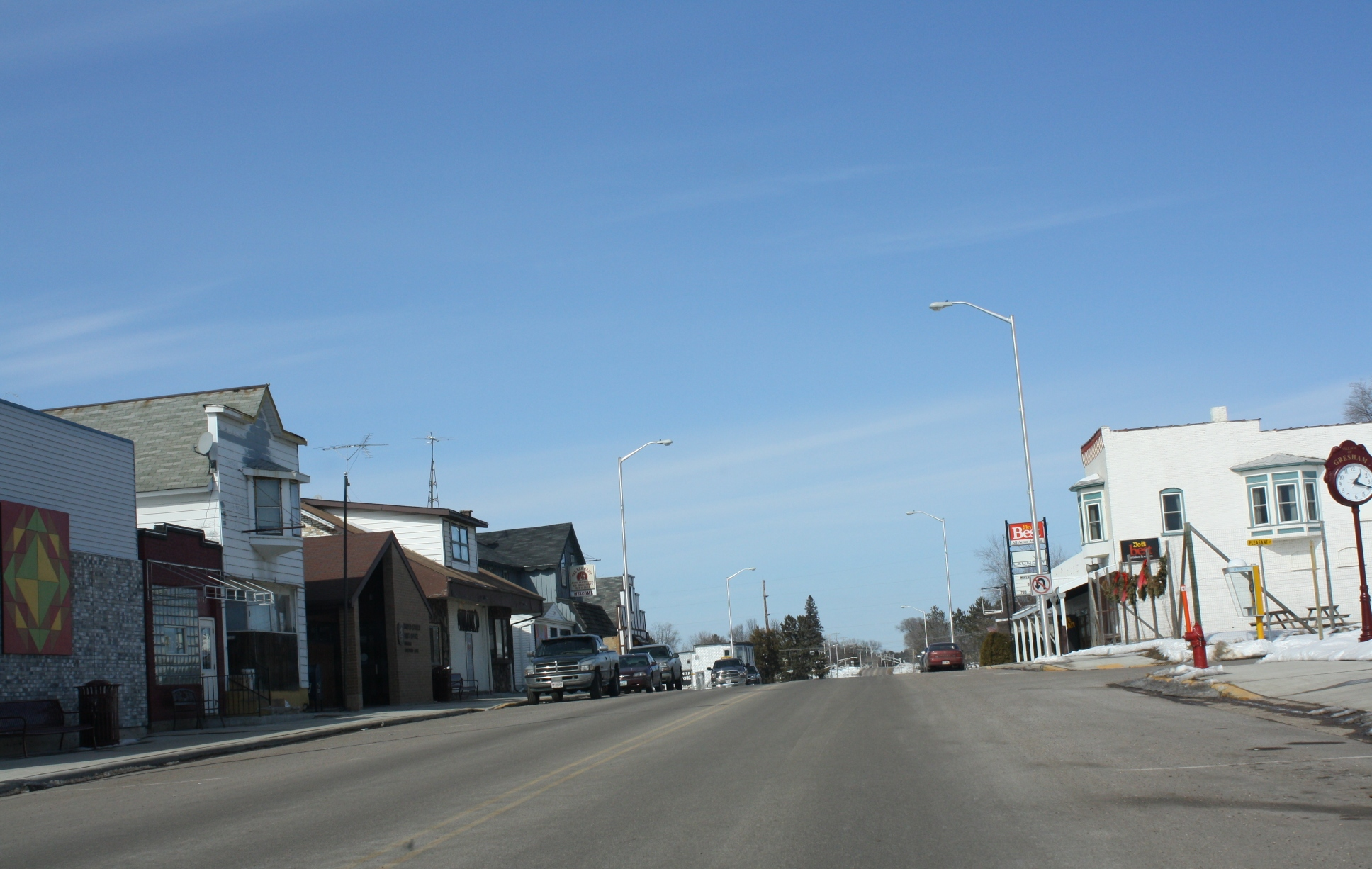
- Looking north in downtown Gresham

- Location of Gresham in Shawano County, Wisconsin.
- Coordinates: 44°51′0″N 88°47′15″W
- Country: United States
- State: Wisconsin
- County: Shawano
- incorporated: 1908

Area
  - Total: 1.21 sq mi (3.14 km^{2})
  - Land: 1.14 sq mi (2.96 km^{2})
  - Water: 0.069 sq mi (0.18 km^{2})
- Elevation: 928 ft (283 m)

Population (2020)
  - Total: 530
  - Density: 460/sq mi (180/km^{2})
- Time zone: UTC-6 (Central (CST))
  - Summer (DST): UTC-5 (CDT)
- Area codes: 715 & 534
- FIPS code: 55-31675
- GNIS feature ID: 1581552
- Website: visit-gresham.com

Gresham is a village in Shawano County, Wisconsin, United States. The population was 530 at the 2020 census.

== History ==
The community was named for Walter Q. Gresham, who was the Postmaster General at the time the post office opened in December 1883. Gresham was home to the Alexian Brothers' Novitiate, which after its closure was the site of a month-long occupation by the Menominee Warrior Society in 1975.

== Geography ==
Gresham is located at 44°51′11″N 088°47′17″W (44.8530328, -88.7881604).

According to the United States Census Bureau, the village has a total area of 1.24 square miles (3.21 km^{2}), of which 1.14 square miles (2.95 km^{2}) is land and 0.10 square miles (0.26 km^{2}) is water.

== Demographics ==
Historical population
Census	Pop.	Note	%±
1910	350		—
1920	309		−11.7%
1930	310		0.3%
1940	295		−4.8%
1950	427		44.7%
1960	458		7.3%
1970	448		−2.2%
1980	534		19.2%
1990	515		−3.6%
2000	575		11.7%
2010	586		1.9%
2020	530		−9.6%
U.S. Decennial Census

=== 2010 census ===
As of the census of 2010, there were 586 people, 239 households, and 145 families living in the village. The population density was 514.0 inhabitants per square mile (198.5/km^{2}). There were 280 housing units at an average density of 245.6 per square mile (94.8/km^{2}). The racial makeup of the village was 67.9% White, 0.2% African American, 24.1% Native American, 0.7% from other races, and 7.2% from two or more races. Hispanic or Latino of any race were 3.2% of the population.

There were 239 households, of which 31.4% had children under the age of 18 living with them, 39.3% were married couples living together, 16.3% had a female householder with no husband present, 5.0% had a male householder with no wife present, and 39.3% were non-families. 33.5% of all households were made up of individuals, and 16.4% had someone living alone who was 65 years of age or older. The average household size was 2.45 and the average family size was 3.12.

The median age in the village was 36.7 years. 27.5% of residents were under the age of 18; 9% were between the ages of 18 and 24; 23.7% were from 25 to 44; 20.1% were from 45 to 64; and 19.6% were 65 years of age or older. The gender makeup of the village was 49.1% male and 50.9% female.

=== 2000 census ===
As of the census of 2000, there were 575 people, 233 households, and 143 families living in the village. The population density was 503.3 people per square mile (194.7/km^{2}). There were 257 housing units at an average density of 225.0 per square mile (87.0/km^{2}). The racial makeup of the village was 68.70% White, 0.17% African American, 23.48% Native American, 0.52% from other races, and 7.13% from two or more races. Hispanic or Latino of any race were 2.09% of the population.

There were 233 households, out of which 32.2% had children under the age of 18 living with them, 41.2% were married couples living together, 15.0% had a female householder with no husband present, and 38.6% were non-families. 34.3% of all households were made up of individuals, and 17.6% had someone living alone who was 65.

== Education ==
Gresham is home to two public schools which serve 282 students.

== Images ==
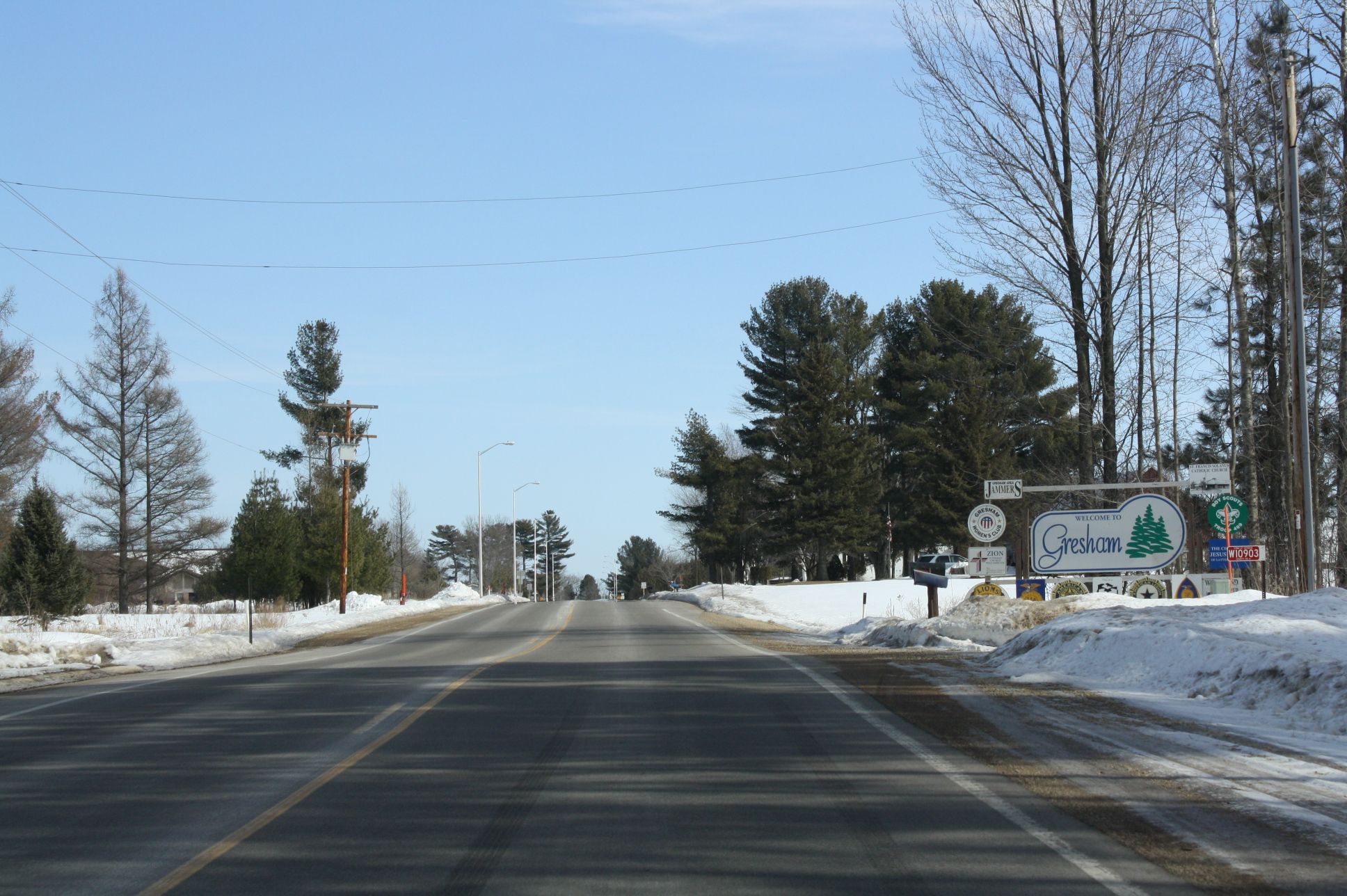
Welcome sign

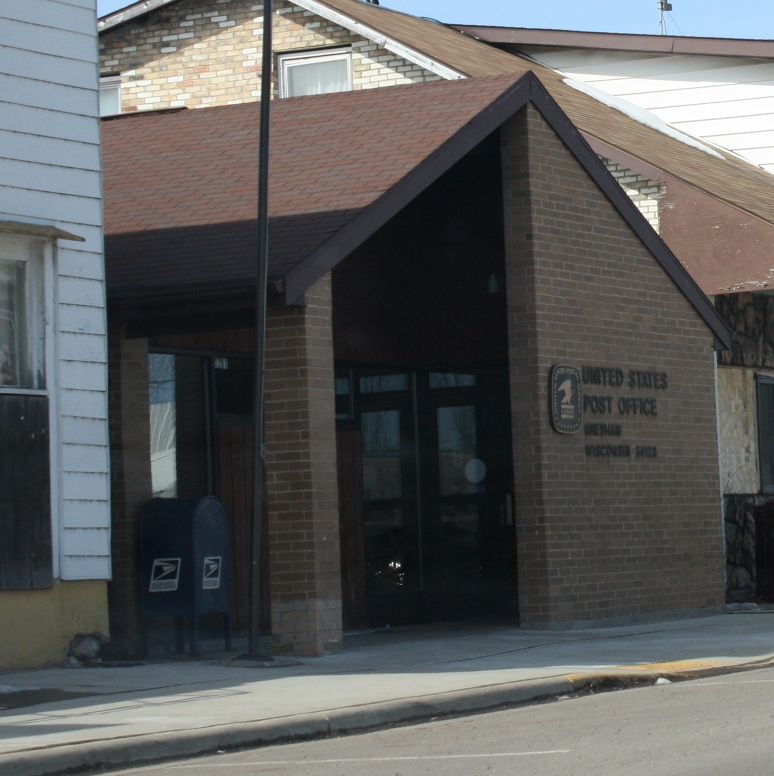
Post office

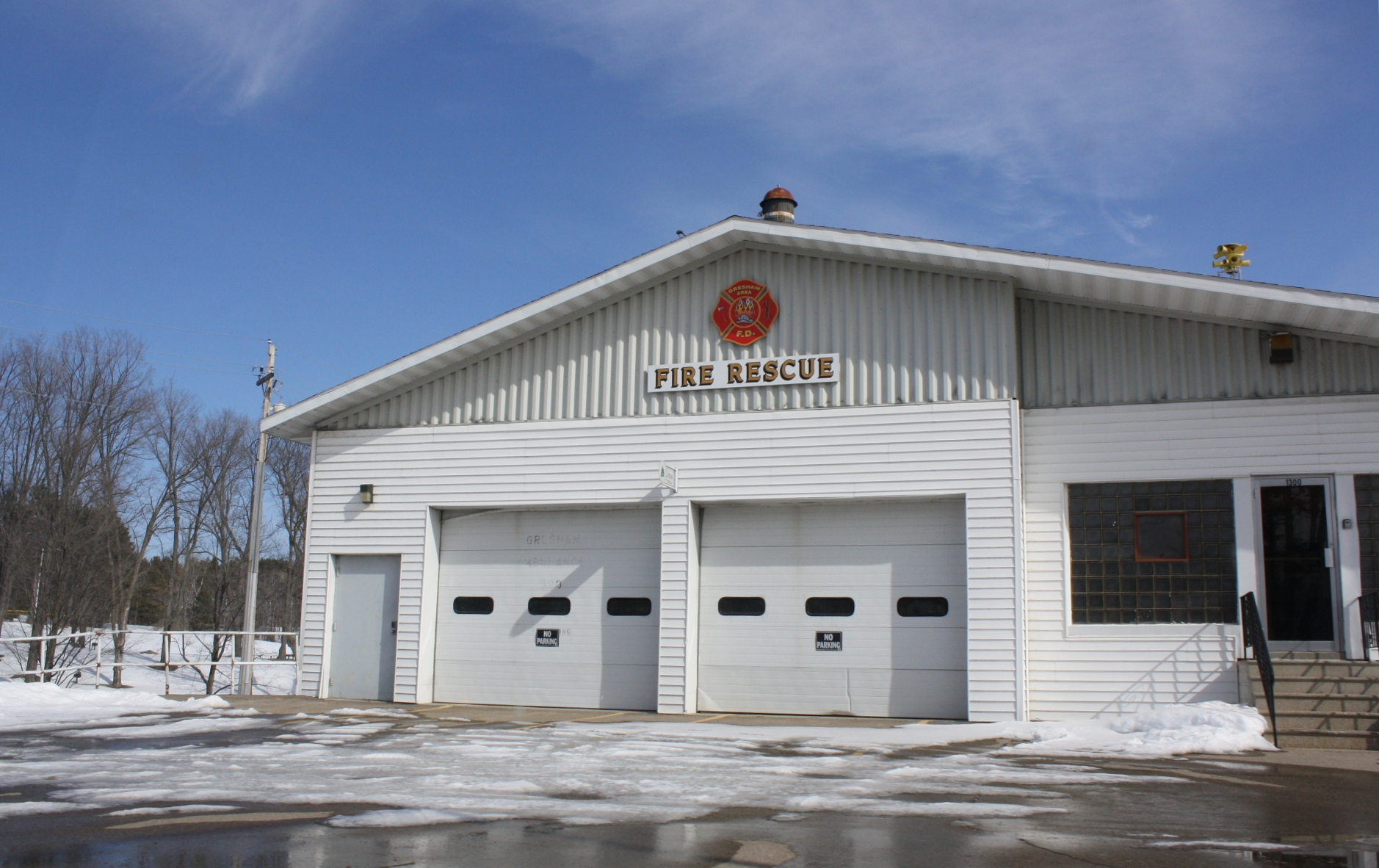
Fire station

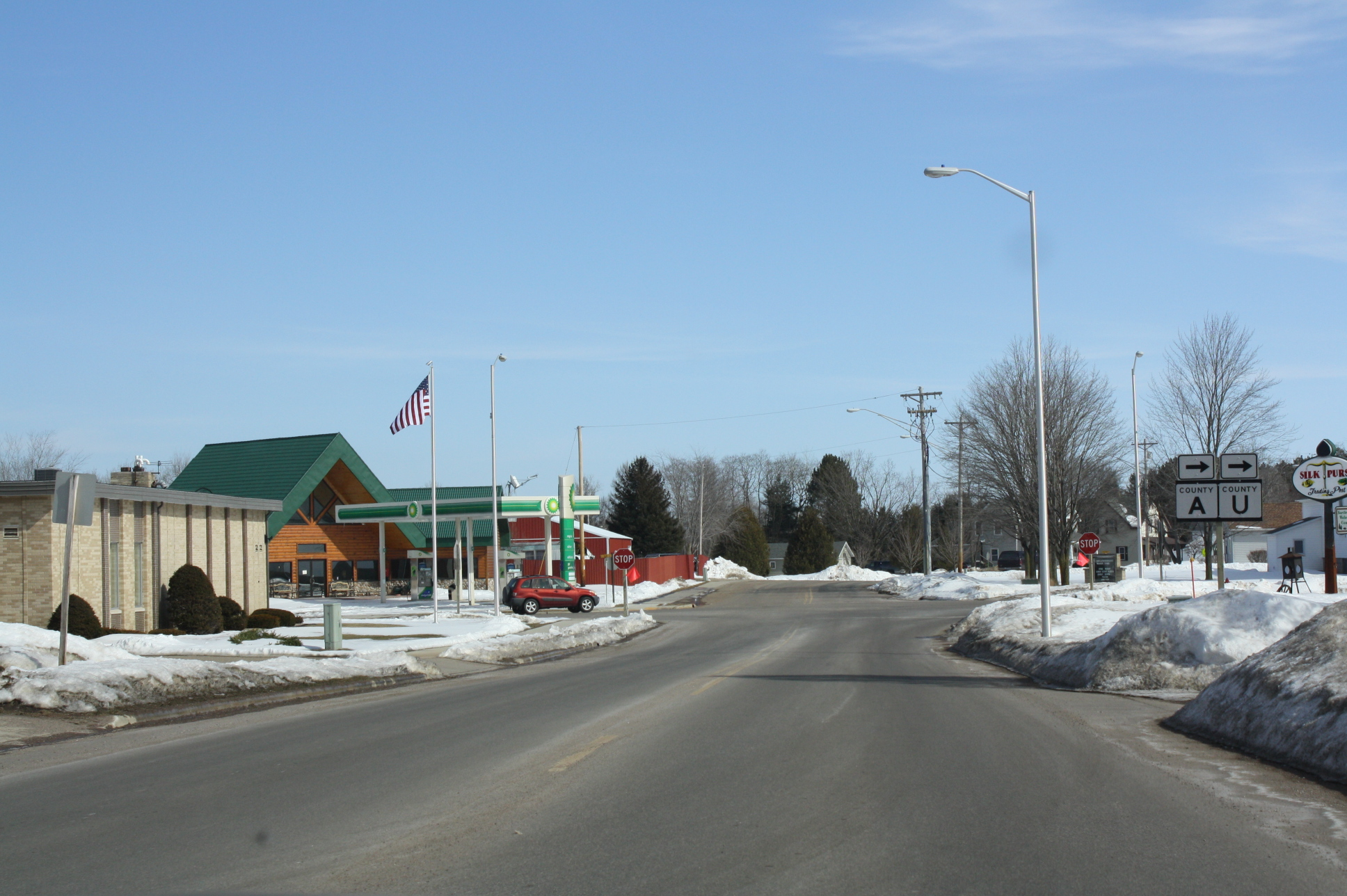
Looking east at Gresham
