= Richmond, Shawano County, Wisconsin =

Richmond, Wisconsin
- Town
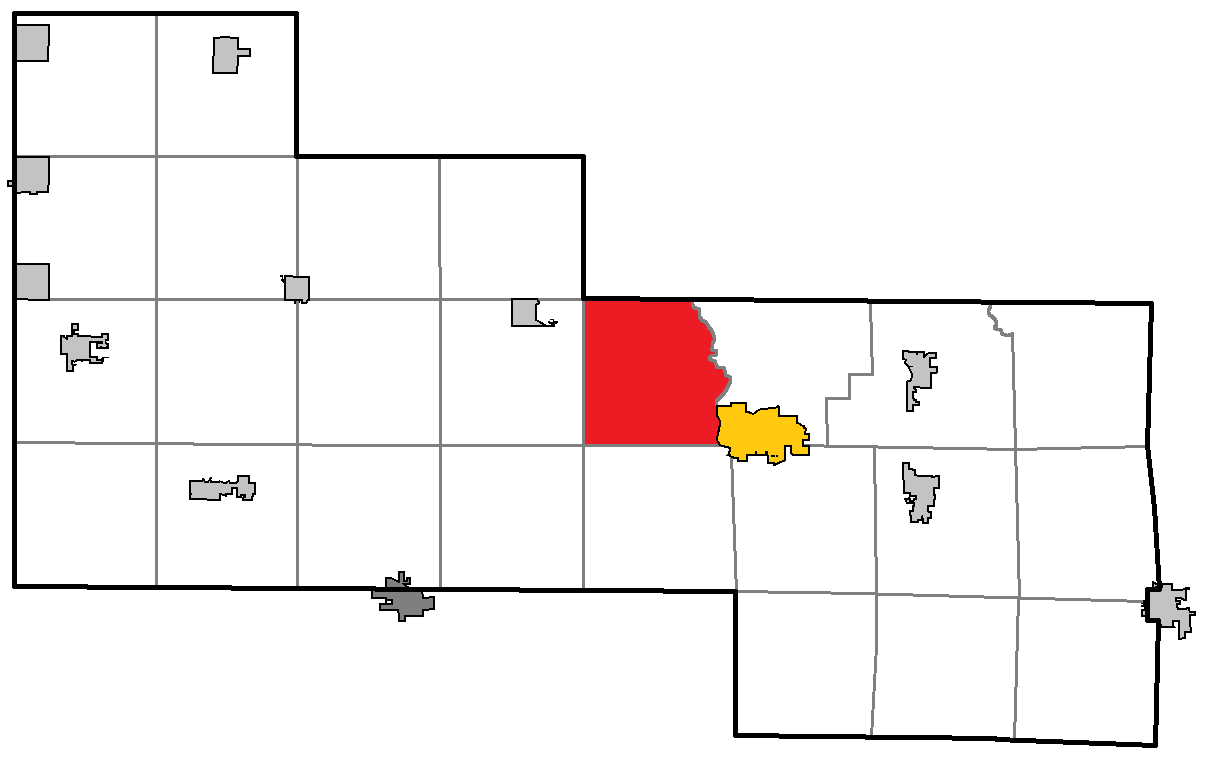
- Location of Richmond, within Shawano County, Wisconsin
- Coordinates: 44°47′39″N 88°39′56″W
- Country: United States
- State: Wisconsin
- County: Shawano

Area
  - Total: 34.4 sq mi (89.1 km^{2})
  - Land: 33.6 sq mi (87.1 km^{2})
  - Water: 0.77 sq mi (2.0 km^{2})
- Elevation: 879 ft (268 m)

Population (2020)
  - Total: 1,832
  - Density: 54.5/sq mi (21.0/km^{2})
- Time zone: UTC-6 (Central (CST))
  - Summer (DST): UTC-5 (CDT)
- FIPS code: 55-67675
- GNIS feature ID: 1584029
- Website: http://richmondwi.com

Richmond is a town in Shawano County, Wisconsin, United States. The population was 1,832 at the 2020 census. The unincorporated communities of Red River and Thornton are located in the town.

== Geography ==
According to the United States Census Bureau, the town has a total area of 34.4 square miles (89.1 km^{2}), of which 33.6 square miles (87.1 km^{2}) is land and 0.8 square mile (2.0 km^{2}) (2.27%) is water.

== Demographics ==
As of the census of 2000, there were 1,719 people, 668 households, and 517 families residing in the town. The population density was 51.1 people per square mile (19.7/km^{2}). There were 719 housing units at an average density of 21.4 per square mile (8.3/km^{2}). The racial makeup of the town was 94.65% White, 0.17% African American, 3.66% Native American, 0.17% Asian, 0.47% from other races, and 0.87% from two or more races. Hispanic or Latino of any race were 1.28% of the population.

There were 668 households, out of which 33.8% had children under the age of 18 living with them, 68.7% were married couples living together, 4.3% had a female householder with no husband present, and 22.5% were non-families. 18.0% of all households were made up of individuals, and 6.6% had someone living alone who was 65 years of age or older. The average household size was 2.57 and the average family size was 2.92.

In the town, the population was spread out, with 24.7% under the age of 18, 5.2% from 18 to 24, 27.9% from 25 to 44, 28.3% from 45 to 64, and 13.9% who were 65 years of age or older. The median age was 40 years. For every 100 females, there were 107.6 males. For every 100 females age 18 and over, there were 102.8 males.

The median income for a household in the town was $43,800, and the median income for a family was $46,736. Males had a median income of $32,670 versus $22,059 for females. The per capita income for the town was $21,628. About 3.5% of families and 4.1% of the population were below the poverty line, including 3.0% of those under age 18 and 3.7% of those age 65 or over.

== Buildings and structures ==
- Alexian Brothers' Novitiate
