= Red River Expedition =

Red River Expedition can refer to different historical events:

- Red River Expedition (1804), by the United States to explore the American West
- Red River Expedition (1806), by the United States to explore the American West
- Red River Expedition (1852), up the Red River of the South in the States of Louisiana and Texas
- Red River Expedition (1856), by the U.S. Army up the Red River of the North from the Mississippi River into the Minnesota Territory (future State of Minnesota)
- Red River Campaign, up the Red River of the South through Louisiana, past Shreveport into Texas during the American Civil War
- Wolseley Expedition, further up the Red River of the North in Manitoba, Canada (1870)
