= Red River (Wolf River tributary) =

River in Wisconsin, United States

The Red River of Wisconsin is a 47.2-mile-long (76.0 km) tributary of the Wolf River. It flows through Gresham and has a dam. Below Gresham, the Red River flows into the Wolf River in northern Shawano County.

The streams headwaters are at 45°04′15″N 89°02′25″W and the confluence with the Wolf River is at 44°49′11″N 88°37′41″W.
