= List of municipalities in Wisconsin by population =

A map of the United States of America with the state of Wisconsin highlighted

Wisconsin is a state located in the Midwestern United States. As of the 2020 census, 5,893,718 lived in Wisconsin, further growing to 5,972,787 in the 2025 estimate.

Wisconsin is the 21st-most populous state and 25th-largest by land area, spanning 54,168.248 square miles (140,295.12 km^{2}) of land. Wisconsin is divided into 72 counties and contains 608 municipalities consisting of 190 cities and 418 villages. The list does not include towns regardless of population, because they are not incorporated entities.

== Municipalities ==
County seat
State capital and county seat

Wisconsin Municipalities map of counties, cities, villages, and towns.

2025 Rank	Municipality	Designation	Primary county	Secondary county(ies)	2025 Estimate	2020 Census	Change	2010 Census	2000 Census	1990 Census	Land area (2025)	Population density (2025)
1	Milwaukee	City	Milwaukee	Waukesha, Washington	562,407	577,222	−2.57%	594,833	596,974	628,088	96.173 square miles (249.09 km^{2})	5,847.87/sq mi (2,257.874/km^{2})
2	Madison	City	Dane		286,233	269,840	+6.08%	233,209	208,054	191,262	84.215 square miles (218.12 km^{2})	3,398.836/sq mi (1,312.298/km^{2})
3	Green Bay	City	Brown		106,675	107,395	−0.67%	104,057	102,313	96,466	45.479 square miles (117.79 km^{2})	2,345.59/sq mi (905.637/km^{2})
4	Kenosha	City	Kenosha		99,239	99,986	−0.75%	99,218	90,352	80,352	29.608 square miles (76.68 km^{2})	3,351.76/sq mi (1,294.123/km^{2})
5	Racine	City	Racine		77,908	77,816	+0.12%	78,860	81,855	84,298	15.472 square miles (40.07 km^{2})	5,035.42/sq mi (1,944.19/km^{2})
6	Appleton	City	Outagamie	Calumet, Winnebago	75,452	75,644	−0.25%	72,623	70,087	65,695	25.422 square miles (65.84 km^{2})	2,967.98/sq mi (1,145.944/km^{2})
7	Eau Claire	City	Eau Claire	Chippewa	72,465	69,421	+4.38%	65,883	61,704	56,856	34.433 square miles (89.18 km^{2})	2,104.52/sq mi (812.560/km^{2})
8	Waukesha	City	Waukesha		70,872	71,158	−0.40%	70,718	64,825	56,958	25.523 square miles (66.10 km^{2})	2,776.79/sq mi (1,072.124/km^{2})
9	Oshkosh	City	Winnebago		67,460	66,816	+0.96%	66,083	62,916	55,006	27.830 square miles (72.08 km^{2})	2,424.00/sq mi (935.91/km^{2})
10	Janesville	City	Rock		66,929	65,615	+2.00%	63,575	59,498	52,133	34.644 square miles (89.73 km^{2})	1,931.91/sq mi (745.914/km^{2})
11	West Allis	City	Milwaukee		60,119	60,325	−0.34%	60,411	61,254	63,221	11.381 square miles (29.48 km^{2})	5,282.40/sq mi (2,039.55/km^{2})
12	La Crosse	City	La Crosse		50,784	52,680	−3.60%	51,320	51,818	51,003	21.707 square miles (56.22 km^{2})	2,339.52/sq mi (903.294/km^{2})
13	Sheboygan	City	Sheboygan		49,376	49,929	−1.11%	49,288	50,792	49,676	16.187 square miles (41.92 km^{2})	3,050.35/sq mi (1,177.75/km^{2})
14	Wauwatosa	City	Milwaukee		48,649	48,387	+0.54%	46,396	47,271	49,366	13.227 square miles (34.26 km^{2})	3,678.01/sq mi (1,420.09/km^{2})
15	Fond du Lac	City	Fond du Lac		44,541	44,678	−0.31%	43,021	42,203	37,757	19.237 square miles (49.82 km^{2})	2,315.38/sq mi (893.97/km^{2})
16	Brookfield	City	Waukesha		41,448	41,464	−0.04%	37,920	38,649	35,184	27.352 square miles (70.84 km^{2})	1,515.36/sq mi (585.082/km^{2})
17	Menomonee Falls	Village	Waukesha		41,291	38,527	+7.17%	35,626	32,647	26,840	32.895 square miles (85.20 km^{2})	1,255.24/sq mi (484.649/km^{2})
18	Wausau	City	Marathon		40,188	39,994	+0.49%	39,106	38,426	37,060	19.228 square miles (49.80 km^{2})	2,090.08/sq mi (806.983/km^{2})
19	New Berlin	City	Waukesha		39,953	40,451	−1.23%	39,584	38,220	33,592	36.426 square miles (94.34 km^{2})	1,096.826/sq mi (423.487/km^{2})
20	Sun Prairie	City	Dane		39,227	35,967	+9.06%	29,364	20,369	15,333	13.094 square miles (33.91 km^{2})	2,995.80/sq mi (1,156.68/km^{2})
21	Oak Creek	City	Milwaukee		38,296	36,497	+4.93%	34,451	28,456	19,513	28.447 square miles (73.68 km^{2})	1,346.22/sq mi (519.780/km^{2})
22	Greenfield	City	Milwaukee		37,159	37,803	−1.70%	36,720	35,476	33,403	11.532 square miles (29.87 km^{2})	3,222.25/sq mi (1,244.12/km^{2})
23	Franklin	City	Milwaukee		36,687	36,816	−0.35%	35,451	29,494	21,855	34.575 square miles (89.55 km^{2})	1,061.085/sq mi (409.687/km^{2})
24	Beloit	City	Rock		36,649	36,657	−0.02%	36,966	35,775	35,573	17.434 square miles (45.15 km^{2})	2,102.16/sq mi (811.65/km^{2})
25	Manitowoc	City	Manitowoc		34,671	34,626	+0.13%	33,736	34,053	32,520	17.950 square miles (46.49 km^{2})	1,931.53/sq mi (745.769/km^{2})
26	Fitchburg	City	Dane		34,615	29,609	+16.91%	25,260	20,501	15,648	35.211 square miles (91.20 km^{2})	983.073/sq mi (379.567/km^{2})
27	West Bend	City	Washington		32,268	31,752	+1.63%	31,078	28,152	23,916	15.668 square miles (40.58 km^{2})	2,059.48/sq mi (795.17/km^{2})
28	Mount Pleasant	Village	Racine		28,253	27,732	+1.88%	26,197	23,142	20,084	33.884 square miles (87.76 km^{2})	833.815/sq mi (321.938/km^{2})
29	Neenah	City	Winnebago		27,638	27,319	+1.17%	25,501	24,507	23,219	9.669 square miles (25.04 km^{2})	2,858.41/sq mi (1,103.64/km^{2})
30	Superior	City	Douglas		26,397	26,751	−1.32%	27,244	27,368	27,134	36.622 square miles (94.85 km^{2})	720.796/sq mi (278.301/km^{2})
31	Stevens Point	City	Portage		26,377	25,666	+2.77%	26,717	24,551	23,006	17.470 square miles (45.25 km^{2})	1,509.85/sq mi (582.955/km^{2})
32	Muskego	City	Waukesha		25,602	25,032	+2.28%	24,135	21,397	16,813	31.601 square miles (81.85 km^{2})	810.164/sq mi (312.806/km^{2})
33	De Pere	City	Brown		25,590	25,410	+0.71%	23,800	20,559	16,569	11.956 square miles (30.97 km^{2})	2,140.3/sq mi (826.39/km^{2})
34	Caledonia	Village	Racine		25,229	25,361	−0.52%	24,705	23,614	20,999	45.198 square miles (117.06 km^{2})	558.188/sq mi (215.518/km^{2})
35	Mequon	City	Ozaukee		25,120	25,142	−0.09%	23,132	21,823	18,885	46.283 square miles (119.87 km^{2})	542.75/sq mi (209.56/km^{2})
36	Middleton	City	Dane		23,115	21,827	+5.90%	17,442	15,770	13,289	9.517 square miles (24.65 km^{2})	2,428.81/sq mi (937.77/km^{2})
37	Watertown	City	Jefferson	Dodge	22,704	22,926	−0.97%	23,861	21,598	19,142	12.200 square miles (31.60 km^{2})	1,860.98/sq mi (718.53/km^{2})
38	Howard	Village	Brown	Outagamie	22,233	19,950	+11.44%	17,399	13,546	9,874	18.704 square miles (48.44 km^{2})	1,188.68/sq mi (458.950/km^{2})
39	Pleasant Prairie	Village	Kenosha		21,798	21,250	+2.58%	19,719	16,136	11,961	33.376 square miles (86.44 km^{2})	653.104/sq mi (252.165/km^{2})
40	Germantown	Village	Washington		21,050	20,917	+0.64%	19,749	18,260	13,658	34.381 square miles (89.05 km^{2})	612.26/sq mi (236.39/km^{2})
41	Onalaska	City	La Crosse		20,297	18,803	+7.95%	17,736	14,839	11,284	10.618 square miles (27.50 km^{2})	1,911.57/sq mi (738.06/km^{2})
42	South Milwaukee	City	Milwaukee		20,191	20,795	−2.90%	21,156	21,256	20,958	4.826 square miles (12.50 km^{2})	4,183.8/sq mi (1,615.37/km^{2})
43	Oconomowoc	City	Waukesha		20,119	18,203	+10.53%	15,759	12,382	10,993	11.819 square miles (30.61 km^{2})	1,702.26/sq mi (657.25/km^{2})
44	Fox Crossing	Village	Winnebago		19,320	18,974	+1.82%	18,498	15,868	14,368	12.641 square miles (32.74 km^{2})	1,528.4/sq mi (590.10/km^{2})
45	Marshfield	City	Wood	Marathon	18,980	18,929	+0.27%	19,118	18,800	19,291	13.820 square miles (35.79 km^{2})	1,373.4/sq mi (530.26/km^{2})
46	Wisconsin Rapids	City	Wood		18,654	18,877	−1.18%	18,367	18,435	18,245	13.902 square miles (36.01 km^{2})	1,341.82/sq mi (518.08/km^{2})
47	Kaukauna	City	Outagamie	Calumet County	18,517	17,089	+8.36%	15,462	12,983	11,982	8.267 square miles (21.41 km^{2})	2,239.87/sq mi (864.82/km^{2})
48	Menasha	City	Winnebago	Calumet	18,385	18,268	+0.64%	17,353	16,331	14,711	6.044 square miles (15.65 km^{2})	3,041.9/sq mi (1,174.47/km^{2})
49	River Falls	City	Pierce	St. Croix	17,916	16,182	+10.72%	15,000	12,560	10,610	7.457 square miles (19.31 km^{2})	2,402.57/sq mi (927.64/km^{2})
50	Cudahy	City	Milwaukee		17,655	18,204	−3.02%	18,267	18,429	18,659	4.774 square miles (12.36 km^{2})	3,698.2/sq mi (1,427.87/km^{2})
51	Ashwaubenon	Village	Brown		17,398	16,991	+2.40%	16,963	17,634	16,376	12.384 square miles (32.07 km^{2})	1,404.88/sq mi (542.43/km^{2})
52	Verona	City	Dane		16,821	14,030	+19.89%	10,619	7,052	5,374	8.277 square miles (21.44 km^{2})	2,032.26/sq mi (784.66/km^{2})
53	Bellevue	Village	Brown		16,776	15,935	+5.28%	14,570	11,828	7,541	14.441 square miles (37.40 km^{2})	1,161.69/sq mi (448.532/km^{2})
54	Menomonie	City	Dunn		16,664	16,843	−1.06%	16,264	14,937	13,547	13.774 square miles (35.67 km^{2})	1,209.82/sq mi (467.112/km^{2})
55	Beaver Dam	City	Dodge		16,542	16,708	−0.99%	16,214	15,169	14,196	8.803 square miles (22.80 km^{2})	1,879.13/sq mi (725.54/km^{2})
56	Waunakee	Village	Dane		16,411	14,879	+10.30%	12,097	8,995	5,897	7.399 square miles (19.16 km^{2})	2,218.00/sq mi (856.38/km^{2})
57	Pewaukee	City	Waukesha		16,375	15,914	+2.90%	13,195	11,783	4,941	19.544 square miles (50.62 km^{2})	837.85/sq mi (323.497/km^{2})
58	Whitewater	City	Walworth	Jefferson	16,038	14,889	+7.72%	14,390	13,437	12,636	8.843 square miles (22.90 km^{2})	1,813.64/sq mi (700.25/km^{2})
59	Hartford	City	Washington	Dodge	16,005	15,626	+2.43%	14,223	10,905	8,188	9.052 square miles (23.44 km^{2})	1,768.12/sq mi (682.67/km^{2})
60	Weston	Village	Marathon		15,931	15,723	+1.32%	14,868	12,079	9,714	21.652 square miles (56.08 km^{2})	735.77/sq mi (284.084/km^{2})
61	Chippewa Falls	City	Chippewa		15,293	14,731	+3.82%	13,661	12,925	12,727	11.370 square miles (29.45 km^{2})	1,345.03/sq mi (519.32/km^{2})
62	Hudson	City	St. Croix		15,019	14,755	+1.79%	12,719	8,775	6,378	6.822 square miles (17.67 km^{2})	2,201.55/sq mi (850.02/km^{2})
63	Glendale	City	Milwaukee		14,795	13,357	+10.77%	12,872	13,367	14,088	5.764 square miles (14.93 km^{2})	2,566.79/sq mi (991.04/km^{2})
64	Harrison	Village	Calumet		14,492	12,418	+16.70%	10,839	5,756	3,195	31.902 square miles (82.63 km^{2})	454.266/sq mi (175.393/km^{2})
65	Whitefish Bay	Village	Milwaukee		14,489	14,954	−3.11%	14,110	14,163	14,272	2.115 square miles (5.48 km^{2})	6,850.6/sq mi (2,645.0/km^{2})
66	Greendale	Village	Milwaukee		14,426	14,854	−2.88%	14,046	14,405	15,128	5.565 square miles (14.41 km^{2})	2,592.3/sq mi (1,000.88/km^{2})
67	Plover	Village	Portage		14,274	13,519	+5.58%	12,123	10,520	8,176	10.713 square miles (27.75 km^{2})	1,332.40/sq mi (514.44/km^{2})
68	Salem Lakes	Village	Kenosha		14,271	14,601	−2.26%	12,067	9,871	7,146	30.354 square miles (78.62 km^{2})	470.152/sq mi (181.527/km^{2})
69	Allouez	Village	Brown		13,838	14,156	−2.25%	13,975	15,443	14,431	4.565 square miles (11.82 km^{2})	3,031.3/sq mi (1,170.40/km^{2})
70	Shorewood	Village	Milwaukee		13,474	13,859	−2.78%	13,162	13,763	14,116	1.590 square miles (4.12 km^{2})	8,474.2/sq mi (3,271.9/km^{2})
71	Grafton	Village	Ozaukee		13,389	12,094	+10.71%	11,459	10,312	9,340	5.330 square miles (13.80 km^{2})	2,512.0/sq mi (969.89/km^{2})
72	Greenville	Village	Outagamie		13,388	12,687	+5.53%	10,309	6,844	3,806	35.719 square miles (92.51 km^{2})	374.815/sq mi (144.717/km^{2})
73	Stoughton	City	Dane		13,256	13,173	+0.63%	12,611	12,354	8,786	6.163 square miles (15.96 km^{2})	2,150.90/sq mi (830.47/km^{2})
74	Baraboo	City	Sauk		13,224	12,556	+5.32%	12,048	10,711	9,203	7.559 square miles (19.58 km^{2})	1,749.44/sq mi (675.46/km^{2})
75	Suamico	Village	Brown		13,153	12,820	+2.60%	11,346	8,686	5,214	36.338 square miles (94.11 km^{2})	361.963/sq mi (139.755/km^{2})
76	DeForest	Village	Dane		13,094	10,811	+21.12%	8,936	7,368	4,882	9.503 square miles (24.61 km^{2})	1,377.88/sq mi (532.00/km^{2})
77	Cedarburg	City	Ozaukee		12,916	12,121	+6.56%	11,412	10,908	9,895	4.921 square miles (12.75 km^{2})	2,624.7/sq mi (1,013.39/km^{2})
78	Brown Deer	Village	Milwaukee		12,821	12,507	+2.51%	11,999	12,170	12,236	4.395 square miles (11.38 km^{2})	2,917.2/sq mi (1,126.33/km^{2})
79	Sussex	Village	Waukesha		12,779	11,487	+11.25%	10,518	8,828	5,039	8.448 square miles (21.88 km^{2})	1,512.67/sq mi (584.04/km^{2})
80	Port Washington	City	Ozaukee		12,658	12,353	+2.47%	11,250	10,467	9,338	5.958 square miles (15.43 km^{2})	2,124.54/sq mi (820.29/km^{2})
81	Fort Atkinson	City	Jefferson		12,388	12,579	−1.52%	12,368	11,621	10,227	5.851 square miles (15.15 km^{2})	2,117.24/sq mi (817.47/km^{2})
82	Holmen	Village	La Crosse		12,105	10,661	+13.54%	9,005	6,177	3,220	7.873 square miles (20.39 km^{2})	1,537.53/sq mi (593.64/km^{2})
83	Oregon	Village	Dane		12,015	11,179	+7.48%	9,231	7,514	4,519	4.563 square miles (11.82 km^{2})	2,633.1/sq mi (1,016.66/km^{2})
84	Platteville	City	Grant		11,815	11,836	−0.18%	11,224	9,989	9,708	6.182 square miles (16.01 km^{2})	1,911.19/sq mi (737.92/km^{2})
85	Little Chute	Village	Outagamie		11,800	11,619	+1.56%	10,449	10,476	9,207	6.452 square miles (16.71 km^{2})	1,829/sq mi (706.1/km^{2})
86	Richfield	Village	Washington		11,785	11,739	+0.39%	11,300	10,373	8,993	35.915 square miles (93.02 km^{2})	328.136/sq mi (126.694/km^{2})
87	Hobart	Village	Brown		11,674	10,211	+14.33%	6,182	5,090	4,284	33.021 square miles (85.52 km^{2})	353.533/sq mi (136.500/km^{2})
88	Two Rivers	City	Manitowoc		11,222	11,271	−0.43%	11,712	12,639	13,030	6.056 square miles (15.68 km^{2})	1,853.04/sq mi (715.46/km^{2})
89	Marinette	City	Marinette		11,168	11,119	+0.44%	10,968	11,749	11,843	7.036 square miles (18.22 km^{2})	1,587.27/sq mi (612.85/km^{2})
90	Lisbon	Village	Waukesha		11,150	10,477	+6.42%	10,157	9,359	8,277	26.307 square miles (68.13 km^{2})	423.84/sq mi (163.65/km^{2})
91	Waupun	City	Dodge	Fond du Lac	11,150	11,344	−1.71%	11,340	10,718	8,207	4.686 square miles (12.14 km^{2})	2,379.4/sq mi (918.7/km^{2})
92	New Richmond	City	St. Croix		10,988	10,079	+9.02%	8,375	6,310	5,106	11.782 square miles (30.52 km^{2})	932.61/sq mi (360.08/km^{2})
93	Burlington	City	Racine	Walworth	10,951	11,047	−0.87%	10,464	9,936	8,855	7.724 square miles (20.01 km^{2})	1,417.79/sq mi (547.41/km^{2})
94	Hartland	Village	Waukesha		10,740	9,501	+13.04%	9,110	7,905	6,906	5.460 square miles (14.14 km^{2})	1,967.0/sq mi (759.5/km^{2})
95	Reedsburg	City	Sauk		10,641	9,984	+6.58%	9,200	7,827	5,834	6.096 square miles (15.79 km^{2})	1,745.57/sq mi (673.97/km^{2})
96	Monroe	City	Green		10,581	10,661	−0.75%	10,827	10,843	10,241	6.018 square miles (15.59 km^{2})	1,758.23/sq mi (678.85/km^{2})
97	Windsor	Village	Dane		10,085	8,754	+15.20%	3,573	2,533	2,182	27.515 square miles (71.26 km^{2})	366.527/sq mi (141.517/km^{2})
98	Elkhorn	City	Walworth		10,045	10,247	−1.97%	10,084	7,305	5,337	8.162 square miles (21.14 km^{2})	1,230.70/sq mi (475.18/km^{2})
99	Sparta	City	Monroe		9,974	10,025	−0.51%	9,522	8,648	7,788	8.006 square miles (20.74 km^{2})	1,245.82/sq mi (481.01/km^{2})
100	Portage	City	Columbia		9,956	10,581	−5.91%	10,324	9,728	8,640	8.924 square miles (23.11 km^{2})	1,115.64/sq mi (430.75/km^{2})
101	Sturgeon Bay	Village	Door		9,917	9,646	+2.81%	9,144	9,437	9,176	9.893 square miles (25.62 km^{2})	1,002.43/sq mi (387.04/km^{2})
102	Shawano	City	Shawano		9,693	9,243	+4.87%	9,305	8,298	7,598	6.750 square miles (17.48 km^{2})	1,436.00/sq mi (554.44/km^{2})
103	Tomah	City	Monroe		9,600	9,570	+0.31%	9,093	8,419	7,570	7.872 square miles (20.39 km^{2})	1,220/sq mi (470.9/km^{2})
104	Merrill	City	Lincoln		9,389	9,347	+0.45%	9,661	10,146	9,860	7.485 square miles (19.39 km^{2})	1,254.38/sq mi (484.32/km^{2})
105	Altoona	City	Eau Claire		9,376	8,293	+13.06%	6,706	6,698	5,889	5.156 square miles (13.35 km^{2})	1,818.46/sq mi (702.11/km^{2})
106	Delavan	City	Walworth		9,228	8,505	+8.50%	8,463	7,956	6,073	7.414 square miles (19.20 km^{2})	1,244.67/sq mi (480.57/km^{2})
107	McFarland	Village	Dane		9,145	8,991	+1.71%	7,808	6,416	5,232	4.854 square miles (12.57 km^{2})	1,884.01/sq mi (727.42/km^{2})
108	St. Francis	City	Milwaukee		8,955	9,161	−2.25%	9,363	8,662	9,245	2.558 square miles (6.63 km^{2})	3,500.8/sq mi (1,351.7/km^{2})
109	Cottage Grove	Village	Dane		8,930	7,303	+22.28%	6,192	4,059	1,131	4.690 square miles (12.15 km^{2})	1,904.1/sq mi (735.2/km^{2})
110	Rice Lake	City	Barron		8,882	9,040	−1.75%	8,438	8,320	7,998	8.971 square miles (23.23 km^{2})	990.08/sq mi (382.27/km^{2})
111	Plymouth	City	Sheboygan		8,821	8,932	−1.24%	8,445	7,781	6,769	5.362 square miles (13.89 km^{2})	1,645.10/sq mi (635.17/km^{2})
112	Lake Geneva	City	Walworth		8,818	8,277	+6.54%	7,651	7,148	5,979	6.989 square miles (18.10 km^{2})	1,261.70/sq mi (487.14/km^{2})
113	Sheboygan Falls	City	Sheboygan		8,687	8,210	+5.81%	7,775	6,772	5,823	5.517 square miles (14.29 km^{2})	1,574.59/sq mi (607.95/km^{2})
114	Monona	City	Dane		8,664	8,624	+0.46%	7,533	8,018	8,637	3.257 square miles (8.44 km^{2})	2,660.1/sq mi (1,027.08/km^{2})
115	Mukwonago	Village	Waukesha	Walworth	8,544	8,262	+3.41%	7,355	6,162	4,464	8.033 square miles (20.81 km^{2})	1,063.61/sq mi (410.66/km^{2})
116	Waukesha	Village	Waukesha		8,507	8,457	+0.59%	9,133	8,596	7,566	20.582 square miles (53.31 km^{2})	413.32/sq mi (159.585/km^{2})
117	Kronenwetter	Village	Marathon		8,413	8,353	+0.72%	7,210	5,369	4,850	51.636 square miles (133.74 km^{2})	162.929/sq mi (62.907/km^{2})
118	Jackson	Village	Washington		8,322	7,185	+15.82%	6,753	4,938	2,486	3.865 square miles (10.01 km^{2})	2,153.2/sq mi (831.34/km^{2})
119	Rhinelander	City	Oneida		8,242	8,285	−0.52%	7,798	7,735	7,427	9.108 square miles (23.59 km^{2})	904.92/sq mi (349.39/km^{2})
120	Pewaukee	Village	Waukesha		8,216	8,238	−0.27%	8,166	8,170	5,287	4.119 square miles (10.67 km^{2})	1,994.7/sq mi (770.14/km^{2})
121	Somers	Village	Kenosha		8,171	8,402	−2.75%	9,569	9,059	7,861	25.791 square miles (66.80 km^{2})	316.816/sq mi (122.323/km^{2})
122	Antigo	City	Langlade		8,060	8,100	−0.49%	8,234	8,560	8,276	6.455 square miles (16.72 km^{2})	1,248.6/sq mi (482.1/km^{2})
123	Ashland	City	Ashland	Bayfield	7,927	7,908	+0.24%	8,216	8,620	8,695	13.365 square miles (34.62 km^{2})	593.12/sq mi (229.004/km^{2})
124	Jefferson	City	Jefferson		7,814	7,793	+0.27%	7,973	7,338	6,078	5.832 square miles (15.10 km^{2})	1,339.85/sq mi (517.32/km^{2})
125	Hales Corners	Village	Milwaukee		7,740	7,720	+0.26%	7,692	7,765	7,623	3.192 square miles (8.27 km^{2})	2,424.8/sq mi (936.2/km^{2})
126	Ripon	City	Fond du Lac		7,738	7,863	−1.59%	7,733	6,828	7,241	5.048 square miles (13.07 km^{2})	1,532.88/sq mi (591.85/km^{2})
127	New London	City	Waupaca	Outagamie	7,726	7,348	+5.14%	7,295	7,085	6,658	5.574 square miles (14.44 km^{2})	1,386.08/sq mi (535.17/km^{2})
128	Mount Horeb	Village	Dane		7,725	7,754	−0.37%	7,009	5,860	4,182	3.270 square miles (8.47 km^{2})	2,362.4/sq mi (912.12/km^{2})
129	Kimberly	Village	Outagamie		7,556	7,320	+3.22%	6,468	6,146	5,406	2.297 square miles (5.95 km^{2})	3,289.5/sq mi (1,270.1/km^{2})
130	Vernon	Village	Waukesha		7,464	7,474	−0.13%	7,601	7,227	7,549	29.980 square miles (77.65 km^{2})	248.966/sq mi (96.126/km^{2})
131	Lake Hallie	Village	Chippewa		7,396	7,170	+3.15%	6,448	4,703	4,531	14.228 square miles (36.85 km^{2})	519.82/sq mi (200.704/km^{2})
132	Delafield	City	Waukesha		7,314	7,185	+1.80%	7,085	6,472	5,347	9.412 square miles (24.38 km^{2})	777.09/sq mi (300.04/km^{2})
133	Rib Mountain	Village	Marathon		7,280	7,313	−0.45%	6,825	7,556	5,605	24.535 square miles (63.55 km^{2})	296.72/sq mi (114.56/km^{2})
134	Sturtevant	Village	Racine		6,852	6,919	−0.97%	6,970	5,287	3,803	4.104 square miles (10.63 km^{2})	1,669.6/sq mi (644.63/km^{2})
135	Lake Mills	City	Jefferson		6,655	6,211	+7.15%	5,708	4,843	4,143	4.183 square miles (10.83 km^{2})	1,590.96/sq mi (614.27/km^{2})
136	Fox Point	Village	Milwaukee		6,583	6,934	−5.06%	6,701	7,012	7,238	2.860 square miles (7.41 km^{2})	2,301.7/sq mi (888.71/km^{2})
137	Slinger	Village	Washington		6,495	5,992	+8.39%	5,068	3,901	2,340	5.494 square miles (14.23 km^{2})	1,182.20/sq mi (456.45/km^{2})
138	Bloomfield	Village	Walworth		6,369	4,781	+33.21%	6,259	5,537	3,723	29.856 square miles (77.33 km^{2})	213.324/sq mi (82.365/km^{2})
139	Elm Grove	Village	Waukesha		6,354	6,513	−2.44%	5,934	6,249	6,261	3.261 square miles (8.45 km^{2})	1,948.5/sq mi (752.31/km^{2})
140	Waupaca	City	Waupaca		6,352	6,282	+1.11%	6,069	5,676	4,957	7.922 square miles (20.52 km^{2})	801.82/sq mi (309.58/km^{2})
141	Twin Lakes	Village	Kenosha		6,338	6,309	+0.46%	5,989	5,124	3,989	8.534 square miles (22.10 km^{2})	742.68/sq mi (286.75/km^{2})
142	Edgerton	City	Rock	Dane	6,121	5,945	+2.96%	5,461	4,933	4,254	4.164 square miles (10.78 km^{2})	1,469.98/sq mi (567.56/km^{2})
143	Waterford	Village	Racine		6,025	5,542	+8.72%	5,368	4,048	2,431	2.552 square miles (6.61 km^{2})	2,360.9/sq mi (911.55/km^{2})
144	Milton	City	Rock		6,024	5,716	+5.39%	5,546	5,132	4,434	4.745 square miles (12.29 km^{2})	1,269.55/sq mi (490.17/km^{2})
145	Evansville	City	Rock		5,837	5,703	+2.35%	5,012	4,039	3,174	3.714 square miles (9.62 km^{2})	1,571.6/sq mi (606.81/km^{2})
146	Rothschild	Village	Marathon		5,627	5,567	+1.08%	5,269	4,970	3,310	6.547 square miles (16.96 km^{2})	859.48/sq mi (331.85/km^{2})
147	Berlin	City	Green Lake	Waushara	5,588	5,571	+0.31%	5,524	5,305	5,371	5.921 square miles (15.34 km^{2})	943.76/sq mi (364.39/km^{2})
148	North Fond du Lac	Village	Fond du Lac		5,425	5,378	+0.87%	5,014	4,557	4,292	2.128 square miles (5.51 km^{2})	2,549.3/sq mi (984.3/km^{2})
149	Prairie du Chien	City	Crawford		5,408	5,506	−1.78%	5,911	6,018	5,659	5.901 square miles (15.28 km^{2})	916.45/sq mi (353.85/km^{2})
150	Columbus	City	Columbia	Dodge	5,400	5,540	−2.53%	4,991	4,479	4,093	4.539 square miles (11.76 km^{2})	1,190/sq mi (459/km^{2})
151	Union Grove	Village	Racine		5,370	4,806	+11.74%	4,915	4,322	3,669	2.595 square miles (6.72 km^{2})	2,069.4/sq mi (799.0/km^{2})
152	Summit	Village	Waukesha		5,323	4,784	+11.27%	4,676	4,999	4,003	20.650 square miles (53.48 km^{2})	257.772/sq mi (99.526/km^{2})
153	Bristol	Village	Kenosha		5,300	5,192	+2.08%	2,584	4,538	3,968	32.700 square miles (84.69 km^{2})	162.1/sq mi (62.6/km^{2})
154	West Salem	Village	La Crosse		5,288	5,277	+0.21%	4,799	4,540	3,611	3.349 square miles (8.67 km^{2})	1,579.0/sq mi (609.65/km^{2})
155	Mayville	City	Dodge		5,184	5,196	−0.23%	5,154	4,902	4,374	3.254 square miles (8.43 km^{2})	1,593.1/sq mi (615.11/km^{2})
156	Dodgeville	City	Iowa		5,076	4,984	+1.85%	4,693	4,220	3,882	4.060 square miles (10.52 km^{2})	1,250.25/sq mi (482.72/km^{2})
157	Richland Center	City	Richland		5,020	5,114	−1.84%	5,184	5,114	5,018	4.769 square miles (12.35 km^{2})	1,052.6/sq mi (406.4/km^{2})
158	East Troy	Village	Walworth		4,988	4,687	+6.42%	4,281	3,564	2,664	4.571 square miles (11.84 km^{2})	1,091.23/sq mi (421.33/km^{2})
159	Oconto	City	Oconto		4,640	4,609	+0.67%	4,513	4,708	4,474	6.781 square miles (17.56 km^{2})	684.3/sq mi (264.20/km^{2})
160	Medford	City	Taylor		4,589	4,349	+5.52%	4,326	4,350	4,283	4.537 square miles (11.75 km^{2})	1,011.46/sq mi (390.53/km^{2})
161	Prescott	City	Pierce		4,581	4,333	+5.72%	4,258	3,764	3,243	2.834 square miles (7.34 km^{2})	1,616.4/sq mi (624.11/km^{2})
162	Kewaskum	Village	Washington	Fond du Lac	4,561	4,309	+5.85%	4,004	3,274	2,515	2.482 square miles (6.43 km^{2})	1,837.6/sq mi (709.51/km^{2})
163	Saukville	Village	Ozaukee		4,554	4,258	+6.95%	4,451	4,068	3,695	3.540 square miles (9.17 km^{2})	1,286.4/sq mi (496.70/km^{2})
164	Mosinee	City	Marathon		4,529	4,452	+1.73%	3,988	4,063	3,820	7.841 square miles (20.31 km^{2})	577.60/sq mi (223.01/km^{2})
165	Clintonville	City	Waupaca		4,499	4,591	−2.00%	4,559	4,736	4,351	4.441 square miles (11.50 km^{2})	1,013.06/sq mi (391.14/km^{2})
166	Viroqua	City	Vernon		4,435	4,504	−1.53%	4,362	4,335	3,922	4.519 square miles (11.70 km^{2})	981.41/sq mi (378.93/km^{2})
167	Baldwin	Village	St. Croix		4,347	4,291	+1.31%	3,957	2,667	2,022	3.324 square miles (8.61 km^{2})	1,307.8/sq mi (504.93/km^{2})
168	Bayside	Village	Milwaukee	Ozaukee	4,331	4,482	−3.37%	4,389	4,518	4,789	2.386 square miles (6.18 km^{2})	1,815.2/sq mi (700.84/km^{2})
169	Prairie du Sac	Village	Sauk		4,316	4,420	−2.35%	3,972	3,231	2,380	1.993 square miles (5.16 km^{2})	2,165.6/sq mi (836.13/km^{2})
170	Chilton	City	Calumet		4,183	4,080	+2.52%	3,933	3,708	3,240	4.040 square miles (10.46 km^{2})	1,035.40/sq mi (399.77/km^{2})
171	Cross Plains	Village	Dane		4,182	4,104	+1.90%	3,538	3,084	2,098	1.881 square miles (4.87 km^{2})	2,223.3/sq mi (858.4/km^{2})
172	Wrightstown	Village	Brown	Outagamie	4,169	3,179	+31.14%	2,827	1,934	1,262	4.540 square miles (11.76 km^{2})	918.28/sq mi (354.55/km^{2})
173	Mauston	City	Juneau		4,133	4,347	−4.92%	4,423	3,740	3,439	4.489 square miles (11.63 km^{2})	920.70/sq mi (355.48/km^{2})
174	Pulaski	Village	Brown	Oconto, Shawano	4,048	3,870	+4.60%	3,539	3,060	2,200	2.946 square miles (7.63 km^{2})	1,374.1/sq mi (530.53/km^{2})
175	Lancaster	City	Grant		4,031	3,907	+3.17%	3,868	4,070	4,192	3.020 square miles (7.82 km^{2})	1,334.8/sq mi (515.36/km^{2})
176	Raymond	Village	Racine		4,006	3,926	+2.04%	3,846	3,516	3,243	35.656 square miles (92.35 km^{2})	112.351/sq mi (43.379/km^{2})
177	West Milwaukee	Village	Milwaukee		3,984	4,114	−3.16%	4,206	4,201	3,973	1.119 square miles (2.90 km^{2})	3,560.3/sq mi (1,374.6/km^{2})
178	Kiel	City	Manitowoc	Calumet	3,973	3,932	+1.04%	3,738	3,450	2,910	2.530 square miles (6.55 km^{2})	1,570.4/sq mi (606.32/km^{2})
179	Horicon	City	Dodge		3,917	3,767	+3.98%	3,655	3,775	3,873	3.502 square miles (9.07 km^{2})	1,118.50/sq mi (431.86/km^{2})
180	Stanley	City	Chippewa	Clark	3,876	3,804	+1.89%	3,608	1,898	2,011	4.294 square miles (11.12 km^{2})	902.65/sq mi (348.52/km^{2})
181	Arcadia	City	Trempealeau		3,840	3,737	+2.76%	2,925	2,402	2,166	3.277 square miles (8.49 km^{2})	1,171.8/sq mi (452.4/km^{2})
182	North Hudson	Village	St. Croix		3,803	3,803	0.00%	3,768	3,463	3,101	1.564 square miles (4.05 km^{2})	2,431.6/sq mi (938.8/km^{2})
183	Rochester	Village	Racine		3,786	3,785	+0.03%	3,682	1,149	978	17.420 square miles (45.12 km^{2})	217.34/sq mi (83.914/km^{2})
184	Marshall	Village	Dane		3,696	3,787	−2.40%	3,862	3,432	2,329	2.143 square miles (5.55 km^{2})	1,724.7/sq mi (665.90/km^{2})
185	Merton	Village	Waukesha		3,676	3,441	+6.83%	3,346	1,926	1,199	3.338 square miles (8.65 km^{2})	1,101.26/sq mi (425.20/km^{2})
186	Omro	City	Winnebago		3,639	3,652	−0.36%	3,517	3,177	2,836	2.448 square miles (6.34 km^{2})	1,486.5/sq mi (573.95/km^{2})
187	Barron	City	Barron		3,634	3,633	+0.03%	3,423	3,248	2,986	2.912 square miles (7.54 km^{2})	1,247.9/sq mi (481.83/km^{2})
188	Bloomer	City	Chippewa		3,634	3,683	−1.33%	3,539	3,347	3,085	2.912 square miles (7.54 km^{2})	1,247.9/sq mi (481.83/km^{2})
189	Seymour	City	Outagamie		3,628	3,546	+2.31%	3,451	3,335	2,782	2.790 square miles (7.23 km^{2})	1,300.4/sq mi (502.07/km^{2})
190	Combined Locks	Village	Outagamie		3,626	3,634	−0.22%	3,328	2,422	2,190	1.859 square miles (4.81 km^{2})	1,950.5/sq mi (753.10/km^{2})
191	Waterloo	City	Jefferson		3,600	3,492	+3.09%	3,333	3,259	2,712	3.794 square miles (9.83 km^{2})	949/sq mi (366/km^{2})
192	Black River Falls	City	Jackson		3,555	3,523	+0.91%	3,622	3,618	3,490	4.242 square miles (10.99 km^{2})	838.05/sq mi (323.57/km^{2})
193	Lake Delton	Village	Sauk		3,451	3,501	−1.43%	2,914	1,982	1,470	7.654 square miles (19.82 km^{2})	450.88/sq mi (174.08/km^{2})
194	Sauk City	Village	Sauk		3,439	3,518	−2.25%	3,410	3,109	3,019	1.603 square miles (4.15 km^{2})	2,145.4/sq mi (828.3/km^{2})
195	Johnson Creek	Village	Jefferson		3,435	3,318	+3.53%	2,738	1,581	1,259	3.028 square miles (7.84 km^{2})	1,134.4/sq mi (438.00/km^{2})
196	Peshtigo	City	Marinette		3,423	3,420	+0.09%	3,502	3,357	3,154	2.913 square miles (7.54 km^{2})	1,175.1/sq mi (453.70/km^{2})
197	Somerset	Village	St. Croix		3,408	3,019	+12.89%	2,635	1,556	1,072	3.318 square miles (8.59 km^{2})	1,027.12/sq mi (396.58/km^{2})
198	Tomahawk	City	Lincoln		3,387	3,441	−1.57%	3,397	3,770	3,328	7.856 square miles (20.35 km^{2})	431.14/sq mi (166.46/km^{2})
199	Hortonville	Village	Outagamie		3,340	3,028	+10.30%	2,711	2,357	2,029	3.392 square miles (8.79 km^{2})	984.7/sq mi (380.2/km^{2})
200	Ellsworth	Village	Pierce		3,336	3,348	−0.36%	3,284	2,909	2,706	3.797 square miles (9.83 km^{2})	878.59/sq mi (339.22/km^{2})
201	Brillion	City	Calumet		3,327	3,262	+1.99%	3,148	2,937	2,840	3.090 square miles (8.00 km^{2})	1,076.7/sq mi (415.72/km^{2})
202	Sherwood	Village	Calumet		3,311	3,271	+1.22%	2,713	1,550	837	3.461 square miles (8.96 km^{2})	956.66/sq mi (369.37/km^{2})
203	Thiensville	Village	Ozaukee		3,267	3,290	−0.70%	3,235	3,254	3,301	1.038 square miles (2.69 km^{2})	3,147.4/sq mi (1,215.2/km^{2})
204	Yorkville	Village	Racine		3,253	3,246	+0.22%	3,071	3,291	2,901	33.491 square miles (86.74 km^{2})	97.131/sq mi (37.502/km^{2})
205	Boscobel	City	Grant		3,250	3,286	−1.10%	3,231	3,047	2,706	3.244 square miles (8.40 km^{2})	1,001.8/sq mi (386.8/km^{2})
206	Algoma	City	Kewaunee		3,225	3,243	−0.56%	3,167	3,357	3,353	2.455 square miles (6.36 km^{2})	1,313.6/sq mi (507.20/km^{2})
207	Brodhead	City	Green	Rock	3,214	3,274	−1.83%	3,293	3,180	3,165	1.795 square miles (4.65 km^{2})	1,790.5/sq mi (691.33/km^{2})
208	Howards Grove	Village	Sheboygan		3,190	3,237	−1.45%	3,188	2,792	2,329	2.225 square miles (5.76 km^{2})	1,433.7/sq mi (553.6/km^{2})
209	Lodi	City	Columbia		3,190	3,189	+0.03%	3,050	2,882	2,093	1.726 square miles (4.47 km^{2})	1,848/sq mi (713.6/km^{2})
210	Ladysmith	City	Rusk		3,172	3,216	−1.37%	3,414	3,932	3,938	4.226 square miles (10.95 km^{2})	750.59/sq mi (289.81/km^{2})
211	Wisconsin Dells	City	Columbia	Sauk, Adams, Juneau	3,149	2,942	+7.04%	2,678	2,418	2,393	7.839 square miles (20.30 km^{2})	401.71/sq mi (155.10/km^{2})
212	Oostburg	Village	Sheboygan		3,056	3,056	0.00%	2,887	2,660	1,931	2.026 square miles (5.25 km^{2})	1,508.4/sq mi (582.39/km^{2})
213	New Holstein	City	Calumet		3,040	3,195	−4.85%	3,236	3,301	3,342	2.509 square miles (6.50 km^{2})	1,211.6/sq mi (467.8/km^{2})
214	Oconto Falls	City	Oconto		3,012	2,957	+1.86%	2,891	2,843	2,584	2.879 square miles (7.46 km^{2})	1,046.2/sq mi (403.94/km^{2})
215	Paddock Lake	Village	Kenosha		2,974	2,919	+1.88%	2,992	3,012	2,662	3.028 square miles (7.84 km^{2})	982.2/sq mi (379.22/km^{2})
216	Williams Bay	Village	Walworth		2,935	2,953	−0.61%	2,564	2,415	2,108	2.779 square miles (7.20 km^{2})	1,056.1/sq mi (407.78/km^{2})
217	Amery	City	Polk		2,927	2,962	−1.18%	2,902	2,845	2,657	3.097 square miles (8.02 km^{2})	945.11/sq mi (364.91/km^{2})
218	Poynette	Village	Columbia		2,924	2,590	+12.90%	2,528	2,266	1,662	2.569 square miles (6.65 km^{2})	1,138.2/sq mi (439.46/km^{2})
219	Osceola	Village	Polk		2,890	2,765	+4.52%	2,568	2,421	2,075	4.060 square miles (10.52 km^{2})	711.8/sq mi (274.8/km^{2})
220	Wales	Village	Waukesha		2,885	2,862	+0.80%	2,549	2,523	2,471	3.226 square miles (8.36 km^{2})	894.30/sq mi (345.29/km^{2})
221	Denmark	Village	Brown		2,875	2,408	+19.39%	2,123	1,958	1,612	1.972 square miles (5.11 km^{2})	1,457.9/sq mi (562.90/km^{2})
222	Genoa City	Village	Walworth	Kenosha	2,866	2,982	−3.89%	3,042	1,949	1,277	2.648 square miles (6.86 km^{2})	1,082.3/sq mi (417.89/km^{2})
223	Mondovi	City	Buffalo		2,853	2,845	+0.28%	2,777	2,634	2,491	3.897 square miles (10.09 km^{2})	732.10/sq mi (282.67/km^{2})
224	Kewaunee	City	Kewaunee		2,793	2,837	−1.55%	2,952	2,806	2,750	3.531 square miles (9.15 km^{2})	790.99/sq mi (305.40/km^{2})
225	Luxemburg	Village	Kewaunee		2,784	2,685	+3.69%	2,515	1,935	1,151	2.449 square miles (6.34 km^{2})	1,136.8/sq mi (438.92/km^{2})
226	Fennimore	City	Grant		2,775	2,764	+0.40%	2,497	2,387	2,378	2.110 square miles (5.46 km^{2})	1,315.2/sq mi (507.79/km^{2})
227	Walworth	Village	Walworth		2,759	2,759	0.00%	2,816	2,304	1,614	1.721 square miles (4.46 km^{2})	1,603.1/sq mi (618.97/km^{2})
228	Juneau	City	Dodge		2,706	2,658	+1.81%	2,814	2,485	2,157	1.649 square miles (4.27 km^{2})	1,641.0/sq mi (633.59/km^{2})
229	Belleville	Village	Dane	Green	2,705	2,491	+8.59%	2,385	1,908	1,456	1.589 square miles (4.12 km^{2})	1,702.3/sq mi (657.3/km^{2})
230	Lomira	Village	Dodge		2,686	2,678	+0.30%	2,430	2,233	1,542	2.196 square miles (5.69 km^{2})	1,223.1/sq mi (472.25/km^{2})
231	Dousman	Village	Waukesha		2,665	2,419	+10.17%	2,302	1,584	1,277	3.046 square miles (7.89 km^{2})	874.92/sq mi (337.81/km^{2})
232	Maine	Village	Marathon		2,621	2,613	+0.31%	2,337	2,407	2,206	43.073 square miles (111.56 km^{2})	60.850/sq mi (23.494/km^{2})
233	Deerfield	Village	Dane		2,619	2,507	+4.47%	2,319	1,971	1,617	2.166 square miles (5.61 km^{2})	1,209.1/sq mi (466.85/km^{2})
234	Hayward	City	Sawyer		2,614	2,533	+3.20%	2,318	2,129	1,897	3.754 square miles (9.72 km^{2})	696.32/sq mi (268.85/km^{2})
235	New Lisbon	City	Juneau		2,577	1,748	+47.43%	2,554	1,436	1,491	2.841 square miles (7.36 km^{2})	907.1/sq mi (350.22/km^{2})
236	Mineral Point	City	Iowa		2,555	2,581	−1.01%	2,487	2,617	2,428	3.136 square miles (8.12 km^{2})	814.73/sq mi (314.57/km^{2})
237	Belgium	Village	Ozaukee		2,540	2,421	+4.92%	2,245	1,678	928	2.149 square miles (5.57 km^{2})	1,181.9/sq mi (456.4/km^{2})
238	Spooner	City	Washburn		2,531	2,477	+2.18%	2,682	2,653	2,464	4.034 square miles (10.45 km^{2})	627.42/sq mi (242.25/km^{2})
239	Winneconne	Village	Winnebago		2,498	2,544	−1.81%	2,383	2,401	2,059	1.483 square miles (3.84 km^{2})	1,684.4/sq mi (650.4/km^{2})
240	Roberts	Village	St. Croix		2,493	1,919	+29.91%	1,651	969	1,043	3.017 square miles (7.81 km^{2})	826.32/sq mi (319.04/km^{2})
241	Darlington	City	Lafayette		2,490	2,462	+1.14%	2,451	2,418	2,235	1.695 square miles (4.39 km^{2})	1,469/sq mi (567.2/km^{2})
242	Westby	City	Vernon		2,435	2,332	+4.42%	2,200	2,045	1,866	2.698 square miles (6.99 km^{2})	902.5/sq mi (348.47/km^{2})
243	Abbotsford	City	Marathon	Clark	2,413	2,275	+6.07%	2,310	1,956	1,916	2.964 square miles (7.68 km^{2})	814.10/sq mi (314.33/km^{2})
244	Wautoma	City	Waushara		2,411	2,209	+9.14%	2,218	1,998	1,784	2.827 square miles (7.32 km^{2})	852.8/sq mi (329.29/km^{2})
245	Nekoosa	City	Wood		2,402	2,449	−1.92%	2,580	2,590	2,557	3.378 square miles (8.75 km^{2})	711.07/sq mi (274.55/km^{2})
246	St. Croix Falls	City	Polk		2,370	2,208	+7.34%	2,133	2,033	1,640	5.002 square miles (12.96 km^{2})	473.8/sq mi (182.9/km^{2})
247	Neillsville	City	Clark		2,367	2,384	−0.71%	2,463	2,731	2,680	2.745 square miles (7.11 km^{2})	862.3/sq mi (332.93/km^{2})
248	Park Falls	City	Price		2,359	2,410	−2.12%	2,462	2,793	3,104	3.765 square miles (9.75 km^{2})	626.56/sq mi (241.92/km^{2})
249	Clinton	Village	Rock		2,336	2,221	+5.18%	2,154	2,162	1,849	1.443 square miles (3.74 km^{2})	1,618.8/sq mi (625.0/km^{2})
250	Schofield	City	Marathon		2,311	2,157	+7.14%	2,169	2,117	2,415	2.115 square miles (5.48 km^{2})	1,092.7/sq mi (421.88/km^{2})
251	Cumberland	City	Barron		2,282	2,274	+0.35%	2,170	2,280	2,163	4.156 square miles (10.76 km^{2})	549.09/sq mi (212.00/km^{2})
252	Kohler	Village	Sheboygan		2,272	2,195	+3.51%	2,120	1,926	1,817	5.318 square miles (13.77 km^{2})	427.23/sq mi (164.95/km^{2})
253	New Glarus	Village	Green		2,266	2,266	0.00%	2,172	2,111	1,899	1.912 square miles (4.95 km^{2})	1,185.1/sq mi (457.59/km^{2})
254	Fredonia	Village	Ozaukee		2,252	2,279	−1.18%	2,160	1,934	1,558	2.236 square miles (5.79 km^{2})	1,007.2/sq mi (388.86/km^{2})
255	Pardeeville	Village	Columbia		2,248	2,074	+8.39%	2,115	1,982	1,630	1.925 square miles (4.99 km^{2})	1,167.8/sq mi (450.89/km^{2})
256	North Prairie	Village	Waukesha		2,193	2,202	−0.41%	2,141	1,571	1,322	2.752 square miles (7.13 km^{2})	796.9/sq mi (307.68/km^{2})
257	Shorewood Hills	Village	Dane		2,155	2,169	−0.65%	1,565	1,732	1,680	0.803 square miles (2.08 km^{2})	2,683.7/sq mi (1,036.2/km^{2})
258	Chetek	City	Barron		2,152	2,172	−0.92%	2,221	2,180	1,953	2.344 square miles (6.07 km^{2})	918.1/sq mi (354.48/km^{2})
259	Eagle	Village	Waukesha		2,115	2,071	+2.12%	1,950	1,707	1,182	1.392 square miles (3.61 km^{2})	1,519.4/sq mi (586.6/km^{2})
260	Redgranite	Village	Waushara		2,113	2,061	+2.52%	2,149	1,040	1,009	2.363 square miles (6.12 km^{2})	894.2/sq mi (345.25/km^{2})
261	Cuba City	City	Grant	Lafayette	2,103	2,138	−1.64%	2,086	2,156	2,024	1.160 square miles (3.00 km^{2})	1,812.9/sq mi (700.0/km^{2})
262	Cedar Grove	Village	Sheboygan		2,083	2,101	−0.86%	2,113	1,887	1,521	2.389 square miles (6.19 km^{2})	871.9/sq mi (336.65/km^{2})
263	Lannon	Village	Waukesha		2,057	1,355	+51.81%	1,107	1,009	924	2.474 square miles (6.41 km^{2})	831.4/sq mi (321.02/km^{2})
264	Washburn	City	Bayfield		2,045	2,051	−0.29%	2,117	2,280	2,285	3.911 square miles (10.13 km^{2})	522.88/sq mi (201.89/km^{2})
265	Campbellsport	Village	Fond du Lac		2,034	1,907	+6.66%	2,016	1,913	1,732	1.366 square miles (3.54 km^{2})	1,489.0/sq mi (574.9/km^{2})
266	Colby	City	Marathon	Clark	1,957	1,952	+0.26%	1,852	1,616	1,532	1.638 square miles (4.24 km^{2})	1,194.7/sq mi (461.30/km^{2})
267	Trempealeau	Village	Trempealeau		1,889	1,843	+2.50%	1,529	1,319	1,039	1.989 square miles (5.15 km^{2})	949.7/sq mi (366.69/km^{2})
268	Fontana-on-Geneva Lake	Village	Walworth		1,886	3,120	−39.55%	1,672	1,754	1,635	3.358 square miles (8.70 km^{2})	561.64/sq mi (216.85/km^{2})
269	Hammond	Village	St. Croix		1,857	1,873	−0.85%	1,922	1,153	1,097	2.160 square miles (5.59 km^{2})	859.7/sq mi (331.94/km^{2})
270	Durand	City	Pepin		1,854	1,854	0.00%	1,931	1,968	2,003	1.748 square miles (4.53 km^{2})	1,060.6/sq mi (409.52/km^{2})
271	Fall River	Village	Columbia		1,853	1,801	+2.89%	1,712	1,097	842	1.889 square miles (4.89 km^{2})	980.9/sq mi (378.74/km^{2})
272	Osseo	City	Trempealeau		1,842	1,811	+1.71%	1,701	1,669	1,551	2.060 square miles (5.34 km^{2})	894.2/sq mi (345.24/km^{2})
273	Cameron	Village	Barron		1,834	1,872	−2.03%	1,783	1,546	1,273	2.588 square miles (6.70 km^{2})	708.7/sq mi (273.61/km^{2})
274	Spencer	Village	Marathon		1,809	1,818	−0.50%	1,925	1,932	1,757	1.970 square miles (5.10 km^{2})	918.3/sq mi (354.55/km^{2})
275	Adams	City	Adams		1,803	1,761	+2.39%	1,967	1,914	1,715	2.945 square miles (7.63 km^{2})	612.22/sq mi (236.38/km^{2})
276	Weyauwega	City	Waupaca		1,788	1,796	−0.45%	1,900	1,806	1,665	1.536 square miles (3.98 km^{2})	1,164.1/sq mi (449.45/km^{2})
277	Thorp	City	Clark		1,781	1,795	−0.78%	1,621	1,536	1,657	1.480 square miles (3.83 km^{2})	1,203.4/sq mi (464.63/km^{2})
278	Randolph	Village	Dodge	Columbia	1,771	1,796	−1.39%	1,811	1,869	1,729	1.241 square miles (3.21 km^{2})	1,427.1/sq mi (551.0/km^{2})
279	Port Edwards	Village	Wood		1,761	1,762	−0.06%	1,818	1,944	1,848	5.980 square miles (15.49 km^{2})	294.48/sq mi (113.70/km^{2})
280	Butler	Village	Waukesha		1,752	1,787	−1.96%	1,841	1,881	2,079	0.782 square miles (2.03 km^{2})	2,240.4/sq mi (865.0/km^{2})
281	Mazomanie	Village	Dane		1,746	1,768	−1.24%	1,652	1,485	1,377	1.769 square miles (4.58 km^{2})	987.0/sq mi (381.08/km^{2})
282	Crandon	City	Forest		1,726	1,713	+0.76%	1,920	1,961	1,958	5.221 square miles (13.52 km^{2})	330.59/sq mi (127.64/km^{2})
283	Palmyra	Village	Jefferson		1,720	1,719	+0.06%	1,781	1,766	1,540	2.291 square miles (5.93 km^{2})	750.8/sq mi (289.9/km^{2})
284	Eagle River	City	Vilas		1,715	1,628	+5.34%	1,398	1,443	1,374	3.257 square miles (8.44 km^{2})	526.56/sq mi (203.31/km^{2})
285	Galesville	City	Trempealeau		1,704	1,662	+2.53%	1,481	1,427	1,278	1.302 square miles (3.37 km^{2})	1,308.8/sq mi (505.3/km^{2})
286	Fox Lake	City	Dodge		1,686	1,604	+5.11%	1,519	1,454	1,269	1.646 square miles (4.26 km^{2})	1,024.3/sq mi (395.48/km^{2})
287	Cambridge	Village	Dane	Jefferson	1,679	1,638	+2.50%	1,457	1,101	963	1.473 square miles (3.82 km^{2})	1,139.9/sq mi (440.10/km^{2})
288	Whiting	Village	Portage		1,649	1,601	+3.00%	1,724	1,760	1,838	1.810 square miles (4.69 km^{2})	911.0/sq mi (351.76/km^{2})
289	Whitehall	City	Trempealeau		1,621	1,645	−1.46%	1,558	1,651	1,494	3.805 square miles (9.85 km^{2})	426.02/sq mi (164.49/km^{2})
290	Wind Point	Village	Racine		1,620	1,651	−1.88%	1,723	1,853	1,941	1.266 square miles (3.28 km^{2})	1,280/sq mi (494.1/km^{2})
291	Stratford	Village	Marathon		1,619	1,581	+2.40%	1,578	1,523	1,515	5.305 square miles (13.74 km^{2})	305.18/sq mi (117.83/km^{2})
292	Orfordville	Village	Rock		1,618	1,473	+9.84%	1,442	1,272	1,219	1.187 square miles (3.07 km^{2})	1,363.1/sq mi (526.3/km^{2})
293	Hurley	City	Iron		1,617	1,558	+3.79%	1,547	1,818	1,782	3.244 square miles (8.40 km^{2})	498.46/sq mi (192.46/km^{2})
294	Cleveland	Village	Manitowoc		1,582	1,579	+0.19%	1,485	1,361	1,398	2.036 square miles (5.27 km^{2})	777.0/sq mi (300.01/km^{2})
295	Niagara	City	Marinette		1,577	1,602	−1.56%	1,624	1,880	1,999	2.762 square miles (7.15 km^{2})	570.96/sq mi (220.45/km^{2})
296	Random Lake	Village	Sheboygan		1,572	1,561	+0.70%	1,594	1,551	1,439	1.508 square miles (3.91 km^{2})	1,042.4/sq mi (402.49/km^{2})
297	West Baraboo	Village	Sauk		1,572	1,627	−3.38%	1,414	1,248	1,021	1.261 square miles (3.27 km^{2})	1,246.6/sq mi (481.3/km^{2})
298	Spring Green	Village	Sauk		1,567	1,566	+0.06%	1,628	1,444	1,283	1.668 square miles (4.32 km^{2})	939.4/sq mi (362.72/km^{2})
299	Bangor	Village	La Crosse		1,564	1,437	+8.84%	1,459	1,400	1,076	1.677 square miles (4.34 km^{2})	932.6/sq mi (360.09/km^{2})
300	River Hills	Village	Milwaukee		1,555	1,602	−2.93%	1,597	1,631	1,612	5.156 square miles (13.35 km^{2})	301.59/sq mi (116.44/km^{2})
301	Sharon	Village	Walworth		1,550	1,586	−2.27%	1,605	1,549	1,250	1.730 square miles (4.48 km^{2})	896.0/sq mi (345.9/km^{2})
302	Brooklyn	Village	Green	Dane	1,547	1,524	+1.51%	1,401	916	789	1.204 square miles (3.12 km^{2})	1,284.9/sq mi (496.1/km^{2})
303	Marathon City	Village	Marathon		1,547	1,576	−1.84%	1,524	1,640	1,606	3.242 square miles (8.40 km^{2})	477.17/sq mi (184.24/km^{2})
304	Darien	Village	Walworth		1,530	1,573	−2.73%	1,580	1,572	1,158	1.517 square miles (3.93 km^{2})	1,009/sq mi (389.4/km^{2})
305	Black Earth	Village	Dane		1,523	1,493	+2.01%	1,338	1,320	1,248	0.844 square miles (2.19 km^{2})	1,804.5/sq mi (696.7/km^{2})
306	Big Bend	Village	Waukesha		1,498	1,483	+1.01%	1,290	1,278	1,299	3.251 square miles (8.42 km^{2})	460.78/sq mi (177.91/km^{2})
307	Phillips	City	Price		1,492	1,533	−2.67%	1,478	1,675	1,592	2.659 square miles (6.89 km^{2})	561.11/sq mi (216.65/km^{2})
308	Independence	City	Trempealeau		1,487	1,498	−0.73%	1,336	1,244	1,041	4.163 square miles (10.78 km^{2})	357.19/sq mi (137.91/km^{2})
309	Augusta	City	Eau Claire		1,483	1,567	−5.36%	1,550	1,460	1,510	2.216 square miles (5.74 km^{2})	669.2/sq mi (258.39/km^{2})
310	Cadott	Village	Chippewa		1,473	1,498	−1.67%	1,437	1,345	1,328	3.402 square miles (8.81 km^{2})	432.98/sq mi (167.17/km^{2})
311	Montello	City	Marquette		1,447	1,448	−0.07%	1,495	1,397	1,329	1.963 square miles (5.08 km^{2})	737.1/sq mi (284.61/km^{2})
312	Cornell	City	Chippewa		1,443	1,453	−0.69%	1,467	1,466	1,541	3.787 square miles (9.81 km^{2})	381.04/sq mi (147.12/km^{2})
313	Spring Valley	Village	Pierce	St. Croix	1,443	1,401	+3.00%	1,352	1,189	1,051	3.965 square miles (10.27 km^{2})	363.93/sq mi (140.52/km^{2})
314	Mishicot	Village	Manitowoc		1,428	1,432	−0.28%	1,442	1,422	1,296	2.551 square miles (6.61 km^{2})	559.78/sq mi (216.13/km^{2})
315	Edgar	Village	Marathon		1,425	1,439	−0.97%	1,479	1,386	1,318	1.808 square miles (4.68 km^{2})	788.2/sq mi (304.31/km^{2})
316	Shell Lake	City	Washburn		1,414	1,371	+3.14%	1,347	1,309	1,161	5.846 square miles (15.14 km^{2})	241.87/sq mi (93.39/km^{2})
317	Manawa	City	Waupaca		1,411	1,441	−2.08%	1,371	1,330	1,169	1.629 square miles (4.22 km^{2})	866.2/sq mi (334.43/km^{2})
318	Bonduel	Village	Shawano		1,409	1,417	−0.56%	1,478	1,416	1,210	2.262 square miles (5.86 km^{2})	622.9/sq mi (240.50/km^{2})
319	Greenleaf	Village	Brown		1,404	733	+91.54%	607			11.562 square miles (29.95 km^{2})	121.43/sq mi (46.885/km^{2})
320	Hillsboro	City	Vernon		1,401	1,397	+0.29%	1,417	1,302	1,288	1.410 square miles (3.65 km^{2})	993.6/sq mi (383.64/km^{2})
321	Fall Creek	Village	Eau Claire		1,390	1,422	−2.25%	1,315	1,236	1,034	2.049 square miles (5.31 km^{2})	678.4/sq mi (261.9/km^{2})
322	Woodville	Village	St. Croix		1,389	1,386	+0.22%	1,344	1,104	942	1.793 square miles (4.64 km^{2})	774.7/sq mi (299.11/km^{2})
323	Markesan	City	Green Lake		1,380	1,377	+0.22%	1,476	1,396	1,496	2.326 square miles (6.02 km^{2})	593.3/sq mi (229.1/km^{2})
324	Grantsburg	Village	Burnett		1,374	1,330	+3.31%	1,341	1,369	1,144	3.039 square miles (7.87 km^{2})	452.12/sq mi (174.57/km^{2})
325	Theresa	Village	Dodge		1,346	1,255	+7.25%	1,262	1,252	771	0.738 square miles (1.91 km^{2})	1,823.8/sq mi (704.2/km^{2})
326	Black Creek	Village	Outagamie		1,335	1,357	−1.62%	1,316	1,192	1,152	0.997 square miles (2.58 km^{2})	1,339.0/sq mi (517.0/km^{2})
327	Barneveld	Village	Iowa		1,333	1,331	+0.15%	1,231	1,088	660	2.099 square miles (5.44 km^{2})	635.1/sq mi (245.20/km^{2})
328	Westfield	Village	Marquette		1,317	1,302	+1.15%	1,254	1,217	1,125	1.572 square miles (4.07 km^{2})	837.8/sq mi (323.47/km^{2})
329	Maple Bluff	Village	Dane		1,305	1,368	−4.61%	1,313	1,358	1,352	0.701 square miles (1.82 km^{2})	1,861.6/sq mi (718.8/km^{2})
330	Muscoda	Village	Grant	Iowa	1,304	1,307	−0.23%	1,299	1,453	1,287	1.601 square miles (4.15 km^{2})	814.5/sq mi (314.48/km^{2})
331	Nashotah	Village	Waukesha		1,298	1,321	−1.74%	1,395	1,266	567	1.627 square miles (4.21 km^{2})	797.8/sq mi (308.03/km^{2})
332	Blair	City	Trempealeau		1,292	1,325	−2.49%	1,366	1,273	1,126	4.302 square miles (11.14 km^{2})	300.33/sq mi (115.96/km^{2})
333	Gillett	City	Oconto		1,276	1,289	−1.01%	1,386	1,256	1,303	1.350 square miles (3.50 km^{2})	945.2/sq mi (364.94/km^{2})
334	Marion	City	Waupaca	Shawano	1,273	1,324	−3.85%	1,260	1,297	1,242	2.455 square miles (6.36 km^{2})	518.53/sq mi (200.21/km^{2})
335	Elroy	City	Juneau		1,255	1,356	−7.45%	1,442	1,578	1,533	2.008 square miles (5.20 km^{2})	625.0/sq mi (241.31/km^{2})
336	Glenwood City	City	St. Croix		1,254	1,306	−3.98%	1,242	1,183	1,026	3.467 square miles (8.98 km^{2})	361.70/sq mi (139.65/km^{2})
337	Princeton	City	Green Lake		1,249	1,267	−1.42%	1,214	1,504	1,458	1.555 square miles (4.03 km^{2})	803.2/sq mi (310.12/km^{2})
338	Shullsburg	City	Lafayette		1,240	1,240	0.00%				1.339 square miles (3.47 km^{2})	926/sq mi (357.6/km^{2})
339	Hilbert	Village	Calumet		1,237	1,248	−0.88%	1,132	1,089	1,211	1.474 square miles (3.82 km^{2})	839.2/sq mi (324.02/km^{2})
340	Iola	Village	Waupaca		1,210	1,249	−3.12%	1,301	1,298	1,125	1.675 square miles (4.34 km^{2})	722/sq mi (278.9/km^{2})
341	Colfax	Village	Dunn		1,193	1,182	+0.93%	1,158	1,136	1,110	1.390 square miles (3.60 km^{2})	858.3/sq mi (331.38/km^{2})
342	Reedsville	Village	Manitowoc		1,191	1,195	−0.33%	1,206	1,187	1,182	1.212 square miles (3.14 km^{2})	982.7/sq mi (379.41/km^{2})
343	Athens	Village	Marathon		1,190	1,059	+12.37%	1,105	1,095	951	2.450 square miles (6.35 km^{2})	485.7/sq mi (187.5/km^{2})
344	Elkhart Lake	Village	Sheboygan		1,190	941	+26.46%	967	1,021	1,019	1.395 square miles (3.61 km^{2})	853/sq mi (329.4/km^{2})
345	Loyal	City	Clark		1,190	1,203	−1.08%	1,261	1,308	1,244	1.337 square miles (3.46 km^{2})	890/sq mi (343.7/km^{2})
346	Sister Bay	Village	Door		1,177	1,148	+2.53%	876	886	675	2.731 square miles (7.07 km^{2})	430.98/sq mi (166.40/km^{2})
347	Cashton	Village	Monroe		1,174	1,158	+1.38%	1,102	1,005	780	1.275 square miles (3.30 km^{2})	920.8/sq mi (355.52/km^{2})
348	Hazel Green	Village	Grant	Lafayette	1,173	1,173	0.00%	1,256	1,183	1,171	1.269 square miles (3.29 km^{2})	924.3/sq mi (356.89/km^{2})
349	Monticello	Village	Green		1,173	1,192	−1.59%	1,217	1,146	1,140	1.194 square miles (3.09 km^{2})	982.4/sq mi (379.3/km^{2})
350	Crivitz	Village	Marinette		1,137	1,093	+4.03%	984	998	996	1.621 square miles (4.20 km^{2})	701.4/sq mi (270.82/km^{2})
351	Lake Nebagamon	Village	Douglas		1,134	1,123	+0.98%	1,069	1,015	900	12.522 square miles (32.43 km^{2})	90.56/sq mi (34.966/km^{2})
352	Frederic	Village	Polk		1,133	1,154	−1.82%	1,137	1,262	1,124	1.691 square miles (4.38 km^{2})	670.0/sq mi (258.70/km^{2})
353	Newburg	Village	Washington	Ozaukee	1,129	1,142	−1.14%	1,254	1,119	875	0.962 square miles (2.49 km^{2})	1,173.6/sq mi (453.1/km^{2})
354	Rio	Village	Columbia		1,123	1,119	+0.36%	1,059	938	768	1.254 square miles (3.25 km^{2})	895.5/sq mi (345.77/km^{2})
355	Amherst	Village	Portage		1,119	1,117	+0.18%	1,035	964	792	1.344 square miles (3.48 km^{2})	832.6/sq mi (321.46/km^{2})
356	Dane	Village	Dane		1,119	1,117	+0.18%	995	799	621	1.184 square miles (3.07 km^{2})	945.1/sq mi (364.9/km^{2})
357	Clear Lake	Village	Polk		1,100	1,099	+0.09%	1,070	1,051	932	2.602 square miles (6.74 km^{2})	423/sq mi (163/km^{2})
358	Albany	Village	Green		1,089	1,096	−0.64%	1,018	1,191	1,140	1.270 square miles (3.29 km^{2})	857.5/sq mi (331.08/km^{2})
359	Dickeyville	Village	Grant		1,085	1,015	+6.90%	1,061	1,043	862	1.468 square miles (3.80 km^{2})	739.1/sq mi (285.37/km^{2})
360	Elk Mound	Village	Dunn		1,084	985	+10.05%	878	785	765	2.277 square miles (5.90 km^{2})	476.1/sq mi (183.81/km^{2})
361	Greenwood	City	Clark		1,079	1,058	+1.98%	1,026	1,079	969	2.698 square miles (6.99 km^{2})	399.93/sq mi (154.41/km^{2})
362	Boyceville	Village	Dunn		1,077	1,100	−2.09%	1,086	1,043	913	3.759 square miles (9.74 km^{2})	286.51/sq mi (110.62/km^{2})
363	Hustisford	Village	Dodge		1,076	1,101	−2.27%	1,123	1,135	979	1.115 square miles (2.89 km^{2})	965.0/sq mi (372.6/km^{2})
364	Strum	Village	Trempealeau		1,075	1,076	−0.09%	1,114	1,001	949	1.228 square miles (3.18 km^{2})	875.4/sq mi (338.00/km^{2})
365	Oakfield	Village	Fond du Lac		1,065	1,052	+1.24%	1,075	1,012	1,003	0.983 square miles (2.55 km^{2})	1,083.4/sq mi (418.3/km^{2})
366	Luck	Village	Polk		1,063	1,093	−2.74%	1,119	1,210	1,022	1.972 square miles (5.11 km^{2})	539.0/sq mi (208.13/km^{2})
367	Belmont	Village	Lafayette		1,042	989	+5.36%	986	871	823	0.855 square miles (2.21 km^{2})	1,218.7/sq mi (470.5/km^{2})
368	Rosendale	Village	Fond du Lac		1,042	1,039	+0.29%	1,063	923	777	1.248 square miles (3.23 km^{2})	834.9/sq mi (322.37/km^{2})
369	Green Lake	City	Green Lake		1,040	1,001	+3.90%	960	1,100	1,064	1.882 square miles (4.87 km^{2})	552.6/sq mi (213.4/km^{2})
370	Turtle Lake	Village	Barron	Polk	1,023	1,037	−1.35%	1,050	1,065	817	2.880 square miles (7.46 km^{2})	355.21/sq mi (137.15/km^{2})
371	Buffalo City	City	Buffalo		1,009	1,007	+0.20%	1,023	1,040	915	1.894 square miles (4.91 km^{2})	532.7/sq mi (205.69/km^{2})
372	Benton	Village	Lafayette		996	946	+5.29%	973	976	898	0.843 square miles (2.18 km^{2})	1,181.5/sq mi (456.2/km^{2})
373	Wittenberg	Village	Shawano		979	1,015	−3.55%	1,081	1,177	1,145	1.811 square miles (4.69 km^{2})	540.6/sq mi (208.72/km^{2})
374	Valders	Village	Manitowoc		959	952	+0.74%	962	948	905	1.439 square miles (3.73 km^{2})	666.4/sq mi (257.31/km^{2})
375	Balsam Lake	Village	Polk		945	934	+1.18%	1,009	950	792	2.276 square miles (5.89 km^{2})	415.20/sq mi (160.31/km^{2})
376	Shiocton	Village	Outagamie		935	939	−0.43%	921	954	913	1.565 square miles (4.05 km^{2})	597.4/sq mi (230.67/km^{2})
377	Milltown	Village	Polk		932	948	−1.69%	917	888	786	1.811 square miles (4.69 km^{2})	514.6/sq mi (198.70/km^{2})
378	Dresser	Village	Polk		930	935	−0.53%	895	732	614	1.895 square miles (4.91 km^{2})	490.8/sq mi (189.5/km^{2})
379	Plainfield	Village	Waushara		926	924	+0.22%	862	899	839	1.558 square miles (4.04 km^{2})	594.4/sq mi (229.48/km^{2})
380	Siren	Village	Burnett		920	824	+11.65%	806	988	863	1.359 square miles (3.52 km^{2})	677/sq mi (261.4/km^{2})
381	Iron Ridge	Village	Dodge		918	904	+1.55%	929	998	887	0.671 square miles (1.74 km^{2})	1,368.1/sq mi (528.2/km^{2})
382	Eden	Village	Fond du Lac		917	884	+3.73%	875	687	610	0.598 square miles (1.55 km^{2})	1,533.4/sq mi (592.1/km^{2})
383	Arena	Village	Iowa		916	844	+8.53%	834	685	525	1.156 square miles (2.99 km^{2})	792.4/sq mi (305.94/km^{2})
384	Kekoskee	Village	Dodge		912	896	+1.79%	161	169	188	31.687 square miles (82.07 km^{2})	28.782/sq mi (11.113/km^{2})
385	Rib Lake	Village	Taylor		912	935	−2.46%	910	878	887	1.743 square miles (4.51 km^{2})	523.2/sq mi (202.02/km^{2})
386	Necedah	Village	Juneau		911	924	−1.41%	916	888	743	2.760 square miles (7.15 km^{2})	330.07/sq mi (127.44/km^{2})
387	Stoddard	Village	Vernon		911	840	+8.45%	774	815	775	0.637 square miles (1.65 km^{2})	1,430.1/sq mi (552.2/km^{2})
388	Owen	City	Clark		904	916	−1.31%	940	936	895	2.299 square miles (5.95 km^{2})	393.21/sq mi (151.82/km^{2})
389	Footville	Village	Rock		898	772	+16.32%	808	788	764	1.128 square miles (2.92 km^{2})	796.1/sq mi (307.38/km^{2})
390	Blue Mounds	Village	Dane		892	948	−5.91%	855	708	446	0.881 square miles (2.28 km^{2})	1,012.5/sq mi (390.9/km^{2})
391	Centuria	Village	Polk		877	891	−1.57%	948	865	790	1.700 square miles (4.40 km^{2})	515.9/sq mi (199.18/km^{2})
392	Brandon	Village	Fond du Lac		875	882	−0.79%	879	912	872	0.758 square miles (1.96 km^{2})	1,154.4/sq mi (445.7/km^{2})
393	Arlington	Village	Columbia		860	844	+1.90%	819	484	440	1.037 square miles (2.69 km^{2})	829/sq mi (320.2/km^{2})
394	Biron	Village	Wood		860	839	+2.50%	839	915	794	4.637 square miles (12.01 km^{2})	185.5/sq mi (71.6/km^{2})
395	Highland	Village	Iowa		860	874	−1.60%	842	855	799	1.138 square miles (2.95 km^{2})	756/sq mi (291.8/km^{2})
396	Dorchester	Village	Clark	Marathon	840	849	−1.06%	876	827	697	1.389 square miles (3.60 km^{2})	605/sq mi (233.5/km^{2})
397	Blanchardville	Village	Lafayette	Iowa	829	807	+2.73%	825	806	802	0.543 square miles (1.41 km^{2})	1,526.7/sq mi (589.5/km^{2})
398	Lone Rock	Village	Richland		828	829	−0.12%	888	929	641	0.995 square miles (2.58 km^{2})	832.2/sq mi (321.3/km^{2})
399	Argyle	Village	Lafayette		822	783	+4.98%	857	823	798	0.633 square miles (1.64 km^{2})	1,298.6/sq mi (501.4/km^{2})
400	Pittsville	City	Wood		820	813	+0.86%	874	866	838	1.987 square miles (5.15 km^{2})	412.7/sq mi (159.3/km^{2})
401	Elmwood	Village	Pierce		805	820	−1.83%	817	841	775	1.515 square miles (3.92 km^{2})	531.4/sq mi (205.16/km^{2})
402	Wild Rose	Village	Waushara		799	780	+2.44%	725	765	676	1.454 square miles (3.77 km^{2})	549.5/sq mi (212.17/km^{2})
403	Hewitt	Village	Wood		798	796	+0.25%	828	670	595	0.931 square miles (2.41 km^{2})	857.1/sq mi (330.9/km^{2})
404	Fountain City	City	Buffalo		769	806	−4.59%	859	983	938	4.375 square miles (11.33 km^{2})	175.77/sq mi (67.87/km^{2})
405	Montreal	City	Iron		769	801	−4.00%	807	838	838	2.221 square miles (5.75 km^{2})	346.24/sq mi (133.68/km^{2})
406	Cambria	Village	Columbia		765	777	−1.54%	767	792	768	0.992 square miles (2.57 km^{2})	771.2/sq mi (297.8/km^{2})
407	Reeseville	Village	Dodge		762	763	−0.13%	708	703	673	0.625 square miles (1.62 km^{2})	1,219.2/sq mi (470.7/km^{2})
408	Coon Valley	Village	Vernon		760	758	+0.26%	765	714	817	1.114 square miles (2.89 km^{2})	682/sq mi (263.4/km^{2})
409	Cassville	Village	Grant		758	777	−2.45%	947	1,085	1,144	1.039 square miles (2.69 km^{2})	729.5/sq mi (281.7/km^{2})
410	Whitelaw	Village	Manitowoc		756	737	+2.58%	757	730	700	0.525 square miles (1.36 km^{2})	1,440.0/sq mi (556.0/km^{2})
411	Bloomington	Village	Grant		754	741	+1.75%	735	701	776	1.262 square miles (3.27 km^{2})	597.5/sq mi (230.68/km^{2})
412	Rockland	Village	La Crosse	Monroe	754	765	−1.44%	594	628	509	0.666 square miles (1.72 km^{2})	1,132.1/sq mi (437.1/km^{2})
413	Bruce	Village	Rusk		749	781	−4.10%	779	787	844	2.308 square miles (5.98 km^{2})	324.52/sq mi (125.30/km^{2})
414	Pepin	Village	Pepin		743	731	+1.64%	837	878	873	0.723 square miles (1.87 km^{2})	1,027.7/sq mi (396.8/km^{2})
415	Coleman	Village	Marinette		738	726	+1.65%	724	716	839	1.350 square miles (3.50 km^{2})	546.7/sq mi (211.07/km^{2})
416	Montfort	Village	Grant	Iowa	734	705	+4.11%	718	663	676	0.565 square miles (1.46 km^{2})	1,299.1/sq mi (501.6/km^{2})
417	Wyocena	Village	Columbia		733	756	−3.04%	768	668	620	1.434 square miles (3.71 km^{2})	511.2/sq mi (197.36/km^{2})
418	Almena	Village	Barron		731	705	+3.69%	677	720	625	1.134 square miles (2.94 km^{2})	644.6/sq mi (248.89/km^{2})
419	Birnamwood	Village	Shawano	Marathon	730	730	0.00%	818	795	693	2.203 square miles (5.71 km^{2})	331.4/sq mi (127.9/km^{2})
420	Viola	Village	Vernon	Richland	728	676	+7.69%	699	667	644	0.996 square miles (2.58 km^{2})	730.9/sq mi (282.2/km^{2})
421	Auburndale	Village	Wood		724	702	+3.13%	703	738	665	2.071 square miles (5.36 km^{2})	349.6/sq mi (134.98/km^{2})
422	Wonewoc	Village	Juneau		723	758	−4.62%	816	834	793	1.117 square miles (2.89 km^{2})	647.3/sq mi (249.91/km^{2})
423	Webster	Village	Burnett		719	694	+3.60%	653	653	623	1.753 square miles (4.54 km^{2})	410.2/sq mi (158.36/km^{2})
424	Alma	City	Buffalo		718	716	+0.28%	781	942	790	5.310 square miles (13.75 km^{2})	135.22/sq mi (52.21/km^{2})
425	Plain	Village	Sauk		717	749	−4.27%	773	792	691	0.909 square miles (2.35 km^{2})	788.8/sq mi (304.5/km^{2})
426	St. Nazianz	Village	Manitowoc		715	714	+0.14%	783	749	693	0.794 square miles (2.06 km^{2})	900.5/sq mi (347.7/km^{2})
427	Tigerton	Village	Shawano		708	708	0.00%	741	764	815	1.824 square miles (4.72 km^{2})	388.2/sq mi (149.87/km^{2})
428	Cascade	Village	Sheboygan		704	722	−2.49%	709	666	620	0.823 square miles (2.13 km^{2})	855.4/sq mi (330.3/km^{2})
429	La Farge	Village	Vernon		701	730	−3.97%	746	775	766	1.009 square miles (2.61 km^{2})	694.7/sq mi (268.2/km^{2})
430	Casco	Village	Kewaunee		692	630	+9.84%	583	572	544	0.666 square miles (1.72 km^{2})	1,039.0/sq mi (401.2/km^{2})
431	Eleva	Village	Trempealeau		688	685	+0.44%	670	635	491	0.576 square miles (1.49 km^{2})	1,194.4/sq mi (461.2/km^{2})
432	Friendship	Village	Adams		683	648	+5.40%	728	698	725	0.912 square miles (2.36 km^{2})	748.9/sq mi (289.2/km^{2})
433	Mellen	City	Ashland		683	698	−2.15%	731	845	935	1.883 square miles (4.88 km^{2})	362.7/sq mi (140.05/km^{2})
434	Francis Creek	Village	Manitowoc		681	659	+3.34%	669	681	562	1.136 square miles (2.94 km^{2})	599.5/sq mi (231.46/km^{2})
435	Fremont	Village	Waupaca		674	689	−2.18%	679	666	632	1.065 square miles (2.76 km^{2})	632.9/sq mi (244.35/km^{2})
436	Solon Springs	Village	Douglas		674	656	+2.74%	600	576	575	1.568 square miles (4.06 km^{2})	429.8/sq mi (165.96/km^{2})
437	Brownsville	Village	Dodge		667	598	+11.54%	581	570	415	0.613 square miles (1.59 km^{2})	1,088.1/sq mi (420.1/km^{2})
438	Superior	Village	Douglas		664	677	−1.92%	664	500	481	1.242 square miles (3.22 km^{2})	534.6/sq mi (206.42/km^{2})
439	Sullivan	Village	Jefferson		663	651	+1.84%	669	688	432	1.136 square miles (2.94 km^{2})	583.6/sq mi (225.34/km^{2})
440	Hatley	Village	Marathon		661	648	+2.01%	574	476	295	0.976 square miles (2.53 km^{2})	677.3/sq mi (261.5/km^{2})
441	Star Prairie	Village	St. Croix		656	678	−3.24%	561	574	507	2.143 square miles (5.55 km^{2})	306.11/sq mi (118.19/km^{2})
442	Stockbridge	Village	Calumet		654	678	−3.54%	636	649	579	3.280 square miles (8.50 km^{2})	199.39/sq mi (76.99/km^{2})
443	Ridgeway	Village	Iowa		650	624	+4.17%	653	689	577	1.283 square miles (3.32 km^{2})	507/sq mi (195.6/km^{2})
444	Potosi	Village	Grant		649	646	+0.46%	688	711	654	1.659 square miles (4.30 km^{2})	391.2/sq mi (151.04/km^{2})
445	Livingston	Village	Grant	Iowa	636	637	−0.16%	664	597	576	1.040 square miles (2.69 km^{2})	611.5/sq mi (236.12/km^{2})
446	Lena	Village	Oconto		631	537	+17.50%	564	510	590	1.063 square miles (2.75 km^{2})	593.6/sq mi (229.19/km^{2})
447	Camp Douglas	Village	Juneau		627	647	−3.09%	601	592	512	1.005 square miles (2.60 km^{2})	623.9/sq mi (240.88/km^{2})
448	Poplar	Village	Douglas		626	629	−0.48%	603	552	516	11.884 square miles (30.78 km^{2})	52.68/sq mi (20.338/km^{2})
449	Wauzeka	Village	Crawford		618	628	−1.59%	711	768	595	4.789 square miles (12.40 km^{2})	129.05/sq mi (49.82/km^{2})
450	Norwalk	Village	Monroe		604	611	−1.15%	638	653	564	1.030 square miles (2.67 km^{2})	586.4/sq mi (226.41/km^{2})
451	Boyd	Village	Chippewa		603	605	−0.33%	552	680	683	1.853 square miles (4.80 km^{2})	325.4/sq mi (125.64/km^{2})
452	Wausaukee	Village	Marinette		594	596	−0.34%	575	572	656	1.376 square miles (3.56 km^{2})	431.7/sq mi (166.67/km^{2})
453	Bayfield	City	Bayfield		589	584	+0.86%	487	611	686	0.868 square miles (2.25 km^{2})	678.6/sq mi (262.0/km^{2})
454	Plum City	Village	Pierce		587	596	−1.51%	599	574	534	1.042 square miles (2.70 km^{2})	563.3/sq mi (217.51/km^{2})
455	Neosho	Village	Dodge		576	591	−2.54%	574	593	658	0.526 square miles (1.36 km^{2})	1,095.1/sq mi (422.8/km^{2})
456	New Auburn	Village	Chippewa	Barron	574	562	+2.14%	548	562	485	3.423 square miles (8.87 km^{2})	167.69/sq mi (64.75/km^{2})
457	North Freedom	Village	Sauk		572	603	−5.14%	701	649	591	0.838 square miles (2.17 km^{2})	682.6/sq mi (263.5/km^{2})
458	Oconomowoc Lake	Village	Waukesha		570	566	+0.71%	595	564	493	1.921 square miles (4.98 km^{2})	296.7/sq mi (114.6/km^{2})
459	Minong	Village	Washburn		556	548	+1.46%	527	531	521	1.525 square miles (3.95 km^{2})	364.6/sq mi (140.77/km^{2})
460	Stetsonville	Village	Taylor		556	563	−1.24%	541	563	511	0.399 square miles (1.03 km^{2})	1,393.5/sq mi (538.0/km^{2})
461	Prentice	Village	Price		555	563	−1.42%	660	626	571	2.019 square miles (5.23 km^{2})	274.89/sq mi (106.14/km^{2})
462	Soldiers Grove	Village	Crawford		549	552	−0.54%	592	653	564	3.646 square miles (9.44 km^{2})	150.58/sq mi (58.14/km^{2})
463	Avoca	Village	Iowa		547	553	−1.08%	637	608	474	2.251 square miles (5.83 km^{2})	243.00/sq mi (93.82/km^{2})
464	Clayton	Village	Polk		546	550	−0.73%	571	507	450	3.211 square miles (8.32 km^{2})	170.04/sq mi (65.65/km^{2})
465	Park Ridge	Village	Portage		545	530	+2.83%	491	488	546	0.227 square miles (0.59 km^{2})	2,401/sq mi (927.0/km^{2})
466	Merrillan	Village	Jackson		544	562	−3.20%	542	585	553	1.267 square miles (3.28 km^{2})	429.4/sq mi (165.78/km^{2})
467	Cecil	Village	Shawano		537	529	+1.51%	570	466	373	1.791 square miles (4.64 km^{2})	299.8/sq mi (115.77/km^{2})
468	Gresham	Village	Shawano		537	530	+1.32%	586	575	515	1.132 square miles (2.93 km^{2})	474.4/sq mi (183.16/km^{2})
469	Oxford	Village	Marquette		536	537	−0.19%	607	536	499	0.838 square miles (2.17 km^{2})	639.6/sq mi (247.0/km^{2})
470	Warrens	Village	Monroe		534	544	−1.84%	363	286	343	1.476 square miles (3.82 km^{2})	361.8/sq mi (139.69/km^{2})
471	Vesper	Village	Wood		531	513	+3.51%	584	541	598	1.155 square miles (2.99 km^{2})	459.7/sq mi (177.51/km^{2})
472	Melrose	Village	Jackson		528	544	−2.94%	503	529	551	0.801 square miles (2.07 km^{2})	659.2/sq mi (254.5/km^{2})
473	Ontario	Village	Vernon		528	534	−1.12%	554	476	407	1.004 square miles (2.60 km^{2})	525.9/sq mi (203.05/km^{2})
474	Withee	Village	Clark		527	506	+4.15%	487	508	503	0.818 square miles (2.12 km^{2})	644.3/sq mi (248.7/km^{2})
475	Merrimac	Village	Sauk		523	527	−0.76%	420	416	392	0.823 square miles (2.13 km^{2})	635.5/sq mi (245.4/km^{2})
476	Wilton	Village	Monroe		523	532	−1.69%	504	519	478	0.891 square miles (2.31 km^{2})	587.0/sq mi (226.6/km^{2})
477	Chenequa	Village	Waukesha		521	526	−0.95%	590	583	601	3.461 square miles (8.96 km^{2})	150.53/sq mi (58.12/km^{2})
478	Ettrick	Village	Trempealeau		518	525	−1.33%	524	521	461	0.739 square miles (1.91 km^{2})	700.9/sq mi (270.6/km^{2})
479	Suring	Village	Oconto		508	517	−1.74%	544	605	626	1.025 square miles (2.65 km^{2})	495.6/sq mi (191.36/km^{2})
480	Gays Mills	Village	Crawford		498	523	−4.78%	491	625	578	4.866 square miles (12.60 km^{2})	102.34/sq mi (39.51/km^{2})
481	Linden	Village	Iowa		498	504	−1.19%	549	615	429	0.780 square miles (2.02 km^{2})	638.5/sq mi (246.5/km^{2})
482	Elmwood Park	Village	Racine		495	510	−2.94%	497	474	534	0.151 square miles (0.39 km^{2})	3,278/sq mi (1,266/km^{2})
483	Mount Calvary	Village	Fond du Lac		492	548	−10.22%	762	956	558	1.056 square miles (2.74 km^{2})	465.9/sq mi (179.89/km^{2})
484	St. Cloud	Village	Fond du Lac		491	489	+0.41%	477	497	494	0.920 square miles (2.38 km^{2})	533.7/sq mi (206.1/km^{2})
485	Knapp	Village	Dunn		485	478	+1.46%	463	421	419	1.570 square miles (4.07 km^{2})	308.9/sq mi (119.27/km^{2})
486	Adell	Village	Sheboygan		483	498	−3.01%	516	517	510	0.558 square miles (1.45 km^{2})	865.6/sq mi (334.2/km^{2})
487	Cobb	Village	Iowa		481	480	+0.21%	458	442	440	1.028 square miles (2.66 km^{2})	467.9/sq mi (180.66/km^{2})
488	Waldo	Village	Sheboygan		480	467	+2.78%	503	450	442	0.973 square miles (2.52 km^{2})	493/sq mi (190.5/km^{2})
489	Alma Center	Village	Jackson		473	487	−2.87%	503	446	416	1.002 square miles (2.60 km^{2})	472.1/sq mi (182.26/km^{2})
490	Lyndon Station	Village	Juneau		473	498	−5.02%	500	458	474	2.113 square miles (5.47 km^{2})	223.85/sq mi (86.43/km^{2})
491	Taylor	Village	Jackson		468	484	−3.31%	476	513	419	0.729 square miles (1.89 km^{2})	642.0/sq mi (247.9/km^{2})
492	Kendall	Village	Monroe		465	484	−3.93%	472	469	453	0.764 square miles (1.98 km^{2})	608.6/sq mi (235.0/km^{2})
493	Prairie Farm	Village	Barron		465	494	−5.87%	473	508	494	0.962 square miles (2.49 km^{2})	483.4/sq mi (186.63/km^{2})
494	Rosholt	Village	Portage		465	478	−2.72%	506	518	512	1.050 square miles (2.72 km^{2})	442.9/sq mi (170.99/km^{2})
495	Forestville	Village	Door		460	482	−4.56%	430	429	470	0.525 square miles (1.36 km^{2})	876/sq mi (338/km^{2})
496	Blue River	Village	Grant		459	457	+0.44%	434	429	438	0.911 square miles (2.36 km^{2})	503.8/sq mi (194.5/km^{2})
497	Glenbeulah	Village	Sheboygan		452	451	+0.22%	463	378	386	0.695 square miles (1.80 km^{2})	650.4/sq mi (251.1/km^{2})
498	Junction City	Village	Portage		449	420	+6.90%	439	440	502	1.511 square miles (3.91 km^{2})	297.2/sq mi (114.73/km^{2})
499	South Wayne	Village	Lafayette		448	444	+0.90%	489	484	478	0.831 square miles (2.15 km^{2})	539.1/sq mi (208.2/km^{2})
500	Bay City	Village	Pierce		447	441	+1.36%	500	465	578	0.591 square miles (1.53 km^{2})	756.3/sq mi (292.0/km^{2})
501	Coloma	Village	Waushara		444	448	−0.89%	450	461	383	1.486 square miles (3.85 km^{2})	298.8/sq mi (115.36/km^{2})
502	Hixton	Village	Jackson		438	456	−3.95%	433	446	345	1.141 square miles (2.96 km^{2})	383.9/sq mi (148.21/km^{2})
503	Lohrville	Village	Waushara		437	434	+0.69%	402	408	368	1.214 square miles (3.14 km^{2})	360.0/sq mi (138.98/km^{2})
504	Fairchild	Village	Eau Claire		435	451	−3.55%	550	564	504	1.455 square miles (3.77 km^{2})	299.0/sq mi (115.43/km^{2})
505	Rudolph	Village	Wood		429	433	−0.92%	439	423	451	1.204 square miles (3.12 km^{2})	356.3/sq mi (137.57/km^{2})
506	Endeavor	Village	Marquette		426	432	−1.39%	468	440	316	0.625 square miles (1.62 km^{2})	681.6/sq mi (263.2/km^{2})
507	Bear Creek	Village	Outagamie		418	427	−2.11%	448	415	418	0.922 square miles (2.39 km^{2})	453.4/sq mi (175.04/km^{2})
508	Cochrane	Village	Buffalo		416	423	−1.65%	450	435	475	0.774 square miles (2.00 km^{2})	537.5/sq mi (207.5/km^{2})
509	Almond	Village	Portage		414	424	−2.36%	448	459	455	1.048 square miles (2.71 km^{2})	395.0/sq mi (152.53/km^{2})
510	Birchwood	Village	Washburn		412	402	+2.49%	442	518	443	1.079 square miles (2.79 km^{2})	381.8/sq mi (147.43/km^{2})
511	Neshkoro	Village	Marquette		410	412	−0.49%	434	453	384	2.012 square miles (5.21 km^{2})	203.8/sq mi (78.7/km^{2})
512	Oliver	Village	Douglas		409	423	−3.31%	399	358	265	2.076 square miles (5.38 km^{2})	197.01/sq mi (76.07/km^{2})
513	Hancock	Village	Waushara		399	393	+1.53%	417	463	382	1.047 square miles (2.71 km^{2})	381.1/sq mi (147.14/km^{2})
514	Egg Harbor	Village	Door		395	358	+10.34%	201	250	183	2.463 square miles (6.38 km^{2})	160.37/sq mi (61.92/km^{2})
515	Clyman	Village	Dodge		393	397	−1.01%	422	388	370	0.375 square miles (0.97 km^{2})	1,048.0/sq mi (404.6/km^{2})
516	Pigeon Falls	Village	Trempealeau		392	381	+2.89%	411	388	289	0.434 square miles (1.12 km^{2})	903.2/sq mi (348.7/km^{2})
517	Gilman	Village	Taylor		380	378	+0.53%	410	474	412	2.340 square miles (6.06 km^{2})	162.4/sq mi (62.7/km^{2})
518	Amherst Junction	Village	Portage		376	383	−1.83%	377	305	269	1.236 square miles (3.20 km^{2})	304.2/sq mi (117.46/km^{2})
519	Readstown	Village	Vernon		370	376	−1.60%	415	395	420	1.711 square miles (4.43 km^{2})	216.2/sq mi (83.5/km^{2})
520	Granton	Village	Clark		368	381	−3.41%	355	406	379	0.545 square miles (1.41 km^{2})	675.2/sq mi (260.7/km^{2})
521	Unity	Village	Marathon	Clark	368	384	−4.17%	343	368	452	0.991 square miles (2.57 km^{2})	371.3/sq mi (143.38/km^{2})
522	Butternut	Village	Ashland		364	366	−0.55%	375	407	416	1.580 square miles (4.09 km^{2})	230.4/sq mi (88.95/km^{2})
523	Scandinavia	Village	Waupaca		364	371	−1.89%	363	349	298	0.874 square miles (2.26 km^{2})	416.5/sq mi (160.80/km^{2})
524	Winter	Village	Sawyer		363	325	+11.69%	313	344	383	0.792 square miles (2.05 km^{2})	458.3/sq mi (177.0/km^{2})
525	Bagley	Village	Grant		356	356	0.00%	379	339	306	0.738 square miles (1.91 km^{2})	482.4/sq mi (186.2/km^{2})
526	Mattoon	Village	Shawano		356	357	−0.28%	438	466	431	1.627 square miles (4.21 km^{2})	218.8/sq mi (84.48/km^{2})
527	Dallas	Village	Barron		351	359	−2.23%	409	356	452	1.446 square miles (3.75 km^{2})	242.7/sq mi (93.72/km^{2})
528	Fairwater	Village	Fond du Lac		351	346	+1.45%	371	350	302	0.735 square miles (1.90 km^{2})	477.6/sq mi (184.4/km^{2})
529	Pound	Village	Marinette		351	357	−1.68%	377	355	434	0.887 square miles (2.30 km^{2})	395.7/sq mi (152.79/km^{2})
530	Cazenovia	Village	Richland	Sauk	350	363	−3.58%	318	326	288	0.915 square miles (2.37 km^{2})	383/sq mi (147.7/km^{2})
531	Maribel	Village	Manitowoc		350	336	+4.17%	351	264	372	1.166 square miles (3.02 km^{2})	300/sq mi (115.9/km^{2})
532	Ephraim	Village	Door		348	345	+0.87%	288	353	261	3.787 square miles (9.81 km^{2})	91.89/sq mi (35.48/km^{2})
533	Rock Springs	Village	Sauk		348	327	+6.42%	362	425	432	1.299 square miles (3.36 km^{2})	267.9/sq mi (103.44/km^{2})
534	Tennyson	Village	Grant		347	348	−0.29%	355	370	378	0.431 square miles (1.12 km^{2})	805.1/sq mi (310.9/km^{2})
535	Embarrass	Village	Waupaca		346	353	−1.98%	404	399	461	1.171 square miles (3.03 km^{2})	295.5/sq mi (114.08/km^{2})
536	La Valle	Village	Sauk		345	388	−11.08%	367	326	446	0.398 square miles (1.03 km^{2})	866.8/sq mi (334.7/km^{2})
537	Eastman	Village	Crawford		333	350	−4.86%	428	437	369	3.580 square miles (9.27 km^{2})	93.02/sq mi (35.91/km^{2})
538	Wheeler	Village	Dunn		327	326	+0.31%	348	317	348	0.823 square miles (2.13 km^{2})	397.3/sq mi (153.4/km^{2})
539	De Soto	Village	Vernon	Crawford	323	309	+4.53%	287	366	326	1.160 square miles (3.00 km^{2})	278.4/sq mi (107.51/km^{2})
540	Hawkins	Village	Rusk		323	331	−2.42%	305	317	375	2.206 square miles (5.71 km^{2})	146.42/sq mi (56.53/km^{2})
541	Friesland	Village	Columbia		317	320	−0.94%	356	298	271	1.010 square miles (2.62 km^{2})	313.9/sq mi (121.18/km^{2})
542	Nelson	Village	Buffalo		314	322	−2.48%	374	395	388	1.353 square miles (3.50 km^{2})	232.1/sq mi (89.61/km^{2})
543	Curtiss	Village	Clark		313	292	+7.19%	216	198	173	0.686 square miles (1.78 km^{2})	456.3/sq mi (176.2/km^{2})
544	Kellnersville	Village	Manitowoc		311	307	+1.30%	332	374	350	0.539 square miles (1.40 km^{2})	577.0/sq mi (222.8/km^{2})
545	Bowler	Village	Shawano		308	320	−3.75%	302	343	279	1.039 square miles (2.69 km^{2})	296.4/sq mi (114.46/km^{2})
546	Oakdale	Village	Monroe		307	302	+1.66%	297	297	162	0.741 square miles (1.92 km^{2})	414.3/sq mi (160.0/km^{2})
547	Hollandale	Village	Iowa		301	306	−1.63%	288	283	256	0.729 square miles (1.89 km^{2})	412.9/sq mi (159.4/km^{2})
548	Arpin	Village	Wood		297	305	−2.62%	333	337	312	0.822 square miles (2.13 km^{2})	361.3/sq mi (139.5/km^{2})
549	Lowell	Village	Dodge		296	309	−4.21%	340	366	300	0.991 square miles (2.57 km^{2})	298.7/sq mi (115.32/km^{2})
550	Kingston	Village	Green Lake		289	281	+2.85%	326	288	346	1.305 square miles (3.38 km^{2})	221.5/sq mi (85.50/km^{2})
551	Nichols	Village	Outagamie		287	290	−1.03%	273	307	254	0.885 square miles (2.29 km^{2})	324.3/sq mi (125.21/km^{2})
552	Radisson	Village	Sawyer		286	273	+4.76%	241	222	237	0.393 square miles (1.02 km^{2})	727.7/sq mi (281.0/km^{2})
553	Loganville	Village	Sauk		285	301	−5.32%	300	276	228	0.265 square miles (0.69 km^{2})	1,075/sq mi (415.2/km^{2})
554	Lac La Belle	Village	Waukesha	Jefferson	274	281	−2.49%	290	329	258	1.107 square miles (2.87 km^{2})	247.5/sq mi (95.57/km^{2})
555	Doylestown	Village	Columbia		272	280	−2.86%	297	328	316	3.883 square miles (10.06 km^{2})	70.05/sq mi (27.05/km^{2})
556	Milladore	Village	Wood		263	268	−1.87%	276	268	314	0.998 square miles (2.58 km^{2})	263.5/sq mi (101.75/km^{2})
557	Ridgeland	Village	Dunn		262	258	+1.55%	273	265	246	0.454 square miles (1.18 km^{2})	577.1/sq mi (222.8/km^{2})
558	Ironton	Village	Sauk		260	274	−5.11%	253	250	200	0.333 square miles (0.86 km^{2})	781/sq mi (301/km^{2})
559	White Lake	Village	Langlade		259	262	−1.15%	363	329	304	2.101 square miles (5.44 km^{2})	123.27/sq mi (47.60/km^{2})
560	Sheldon	Village	Rusk		255	261	−2.30%	237	256	268	0.662 square miles (1.71 km^{2})	385.2/sq mi (148.7/km^{2})
561	Rewey	Village	Iowa		252	258	−2.33%	292	311	220	0.507 square miles (1.31 km^{2})	497.0/sq mi (191.9/km^{2})
562	Haugen	Village	Barron		249	266	−6.39%	287	287	305	0.504 square miles (1.31 km^{2})	494.0/sq mi (190.8/km^{2})
563	Deer Park	Village	St. Croix		243	249	−2.41%	216	227	237	0.898 square miles (2.33 km^{2})	270.6/sq mi (104.48/km^{2})
564	Browntown	Village	Green		242	245	−1.22%	280	252	256	1.054 square miles (2.73 km^{2})	229.6/sq mi (88.65/km^{2})
565	Chaseburg	Village	Vernon		240	241	−0.41%	284	306	365	0.843 square miles (2.18 km^{2})	285/sq mi (109.9/km^{2})
566	Aniwa	Village	Shawano		236	243	−2.88%	260	272	249	2.130 square miles (5.52 km^{2})	110.80/sq mi (42.78/km^{2})
567	Gratiot	Village	Lafayette		234	224	+4.46%	236	252	207	0.548 square miles (1.42 km^{2})	427.0/sq mi (164.9/km^{2})
568	Potter	Village	Calumet		232	244	−4.92%	253	223	252	0.505 square miles (1.31 km^{2})	459.4/sq mi (177.4/km^{2})
569	Weyerhaeuser	Village	Rusk		232	232	0.00%	238	353	283	0.936 square miles (2.42 km^{2})	247.9/sq mi (95.70/km^{2})
570	Genoa	Village	Vernon		228	232	−1.72%	253	263	266	0.357 square miles (0.92 km^{2})	638.7/sq mi (246.6/km^{2})
571	Downing	Village	Dunn		225	234	−3.85%	265	257	250	2.955 square miles (7.65 km^{2})	76.14/sq mi (29.40/km^{2})
572	Exeland	Village	Sawyer		225	229	−1.75%	196	212	180	1.201 square miles (3.11 km^{2})	187.3/sq mi (72.33/km^{2})
573	Union Center	Village	Juneau		220	225	−2.22%	200	214	197	0.824 square miles (2.13 km^{2})	267/sq mi (103.1/km^{2})
574	Mount Hope	Village	Grant		212	215	−1.40%	225	186	173	0.276 square miles (0.71 km^{2})	768/sq mi (296.6/km^{2})
575	North Bay	Village	Racine		203	209	−2.87%	241	260	246	0.105 square miles (0.27 km^{2})	1,933/sq mi (746/km^{2})
576	Wilson	Village	St. Croix		202	209	−3.35%	184	176	163	1.706 square miles (4.42 km^{2})	118.4/sq mi (45.72/km^{2})
577	Rockdale	Village	Dane		201	207	−2.90%	214	214	235	0.281 square miles (0.73 km^{2})	715.3/sq mi (276.2/km^{2})
578	Eland	Village	Shawano		194	199	−2.51%	202	251	247	2.213 square miles (5.73 km^{2})	87.66/sq mi (33.85/km^{2})
579	Patch Grove	Village	Grant		194	201	−3.48%	198	166	202	0.379 square miles (0.98 km^{2})	511.9/sq mi (197.6/km^{2})
580	Ferryville	Village	Crawford		191	191	0.00%	176	174	154	2.127 square miles (5.51 km^{2})	89.80/sq mi (34.67/km^{2})
581	Mount Sterling	Village	Crawford		182	189	−3.70%	211	215	217	1.429 square miles (3.70 km^{2})	127.4/sq mi (49.17/km^{2})
582	Ogdensburg	Village	Waupaca		178	188	−5.32%	185	224	220	0.973 square miles (2.52 km^{2})	182.9/sq mi (70.63/km^{2})
583	Marquette	Village	Green Lake		173	172	+0.58%	150	169	182	0.374 square miles (0.97 km^{2})	462.6/sq mi (178.6/km^{2})
584	Nelsonville	Village	Portage		169	158	+6.96%	155	191	171	1.029 square miles (2.67 km^{2})	164.2/sq mi (63.41/km^{2})
585	Hustler	Village	Juneau		159	162	−1.85%	194	113	156	0.698 square miles (1.81 km^{2})	227.8/sq mi (88.0/km^{2})
586	Lime Ridge	Village	Sauk		156	158	−1.27%	162	169	152	1.001 square miles (2.59 km^{2})	155.8/sq mi (60.17/km^{2})
587	Elderon	Village	Marathon		150	161	−6.83%	179	189	175	1.124 square miles (2.91 km^{2})	133/sq mi (51.5/km^{2})
588	Kennan	Village	Price		143	143	0.00%	135	171	169	1.984 square miles (5.14 km^{2})	72.08/sq mi (27.83/km^{2})
589	Fenwood	Village	Marathon		140	141	−0.71%	152	174	214	0.984 square miles (2.55 km^{2})	142/sq mi (54.9/km^{2})
590	Catawba	Village	Price		136	141	−3.55%	110	149	178	4.437 square miles (11.49 km^{2})	30.65/sq mi (11.83/km^{2})
591	Lynxville	Village	Crawford		134	132	+1.52%	132	176	153	1.390 square miles (3.60 km^{2})	96.4/sq mi (37.22/km^{2})
592	Woodman	Village	Grant		126	118	+6.78%	132	96	120	0.249 square miles (0.64 km^{2})	506.0/sq mi (195.4/km^{2})
593	Boaz	Village	Richland		122	129	−5.43%	156	137	131	0.360 square miles (0.93 km^{2})	338.9/sq mi (130.8/km^{2})
594	Maiden Rock	Village	Pierce		118	115	+2.61%	119	121	146	1.205 square miles (3.12 km^{2})	97.9/sq mi (37.81/km^{2})
595	Wyeville	Village	Monroe		117	121	−3.31%	147	146	154	0.565 square miles (1.46 km^{2})	207.1/sq mi (80.0/km^{2})
596	Steuben	Village	Crawford		115	122	−5.74%	131	177	161	6.201 square miles (16.06 km^{2})	18.55/sq mi (7.16/km^{2})
597	Lublin	Village	Taylor		113	117	−3.42%	118	110	129	1.524 square miles (3.95 km^{2})	74.1/sq mi (28.63/km^{2})
598	Bell Center	Village	Crawford		106	108	−1.85%	117	116	127	5.533 square miles (14.33 km^{2})	19.16/sq mi (7.40/km^{2})
599	Mason	Village	Bayfield		104	101	+2.97%	93	72	102	0.769 square miles (1.99 km^{2})	135.2/sq mi (52.22/km^{2})
600	Tony	Village	Rusk		99	105	−5.71%	113	105	114	2.025 square miles (5.24 km^{2})	48.89/sq mi (18.88/km^{2})
601	Glen Flora	Village	Rusk		96	100	−4.00%	92	93	108	0.565 square miles (1.46 km^{2})	169.9/sq mi (65.6/km^{2})
602	Melvina	Village	Monroe		94	93	+1.08%	104	93	115	0.486 square miles (1.26 km^{2})	193.4/sq mi (74.7/km^{2})
603	Conrath	Village	Rusk		88	88	0.00%	95	98	92	0.523 square miles (1.35 km^{2})	168.3/sq mi (65.0/km^{2})
604	Stockholm	Village	Pepin		87	78	+11.54%	66	97	89	0.942 square miles (2.44 km^{2})	92.4/sq mi (35.66/km^{2})
605	Couderay	Village	Sawyer		83	81	+2.47%	88	96	92	0.969 square miles (2.51 km^{2})	85.7/sq mi (33.07/km^{2})
606	Ingram	Village	Rusk		69	70	−1.43%	78	76	91	0.993 square miles (2.57 km^{2})	69.5/sq mi (26.83/km^{2})
607	Big Falls	Village	Waupaca		61	60	+1.67%	61	85	75	0.474 square miles (1.23 km^{2})	128.7/sq mi (49.7/km^{2})
608	Yuba	Village	Richland		51	53	−3.77%	74	92	77	0.278 square miles (0.72 km^{2})	183.5/sq mi (70.8/km^{2})

== See also ==
- List of census-designated places in Wisconsin
- List of cities in Wisconsin
- List of counties in Wisconsin
- List of towns in Wisconsin
- List of villages in Wisconsin
- Political subdivisions of Wisconsin
