= Fenwood =

Fenwood may refer to the following places:

- Fenwood, Saskatchewan, Canada
- Fenwood, Wisconsin, United States
