= Gerald G. Boyce =

American painter, artist and educator (1925–1999)

Gerald Gladwin Boyce (December 29, 1925 – December 15, 1999) was an American artist and educator whose work achieved both national and international recognition. He served with the United States Army Air Force at the end of World War II.

Gerald Boyce and one of his paintings, 1961

== Early life and education ==
Gerald Gladwin Boyce was born in Embarrass, Wisconsin on December 29, 1925, to Charles William and Selma (Van Norman) Boyce. He was the youngest of 5 children, four boys and a girl.

Boyce graduated from Wisconsin State University in 1949 with a bachelor's degree in Science. University of Iowa with a Master of Fine Arts degree in 1950. Postgraduate degrees from Americano Guatemalteco Instituto in Guatemala, Indiana University, University of Illinois, and Oxford University in England 1979. He did independent studies at the British Museum in London and Courtauld Institute of Art in London.

== Career ==
Boyce worked as a professor of art history and chairman of the Art Department at the University of Indianapolis 1950–1988. Lecturer of art history at DePauw University 1968–1984. Teacher at Fresno State College 1951, Wabash College, Indiana University, St. John's University, and Smithsonian Institution. Boyce was also a member of Governor's Commission on the Arts, Member of the National College Art Conference, American Crafts Council (secretary North Central region 1962–1966), College Art Association, National Art Administrators Conference, Ethnographic Arts Society (Executive Committee), and Association of Gravestone Studies. He served as president of the Indiana Artist-Craftsmen for 2 years.

Recognized for his work as a painter, draftsman, and silversmith, he had exhibited widely. Among those exhibitions were The Museum of Modern Art, New York City; the Corcoran Gallery of Art, Washington D.C.; the American Federation of Arts, New York City; the Museum of Contemporary Crafts, New York City; San Francisco Museum of Modern Art; Los Angeles Art Museum; Chicago Art Institute; Indiana University; Ohio State University; University of Michigan; University of Wisconsin; and the University of Iowa. His one-man exhibitions include "The Gallery" in Bloomington; Purdue University; St. John's University, New York City; Ball State University, and several private galleries.

== Recognition ==
Gerald G. Boyce was listed in "Who's Who in American Art", "Who's Who in the Midwest", "Who's Who in Education", Dictionary of International Biography, and Outstanding Educators in America (1970).

There is a scholarship at the University of Indianapolis "Gerald G. Boyce Scholarship", named after him.

== Art style ==
His earlier works were mostly larger canvas oil paintings. Boyce suffered an injury while building his home in 1969, while hammering a board, a nail flipped up and entered his left eye, resulting in the loss of the eye. After the accident, his depth perception was affected, and he switched to smaller scale artwork using silverpoint and gold leaf. He preferred this method, quote "There's a certain sensitivity to subjects, to ideas, that comes off better for me with silverpoint, than, say, oil painting. The medium allows me to be as descriptive and as generalizing as I want to be. Also, I like to employ writing as an area technique and as a texture on a surface. The writing is pertinent to the theme of the piece."

In the late 1980s, he started crafting terra cota art in his newly built home-studio. Inspired by medieval towers and arches, including symbols of the church such as robed catholic prelates with their miters. He built these brick by brick and used cracks and deteriorating surfaces that suggest passage of time and events. His art included metaphors pertaining to religions, governments, and subjugation.

== Teaching ==
Boyce's philosophy on teaching and educating, when talking about young children's creative expression being honest and "unspoiled". "If genes predetermine whether an individual will lean toward 'creative' or 'scientific', then a child's creative tendency must be encouraged early, or he will lose it.", "School develops perceptive ability because it's important in the curriculum. Students are taught how to see, to analyze, to categorize. If a child draws a [crude] tree, some day he'll get tired of it and realize it's not a tree. But in the first grade a teacher will say 'Trees don't look like that.' The child loses his confidence and gradually begins to learn a pat phrase--'I don't know how.; I don't know how to draw a horse; I don't know how to draw a house etc.--because he's been criticized for his lack of ability to see as an adult. The easiest way to teach is to let a child be creative rather than drive his creative nature. Some get through school in spite of the teachers and still are very creative people."

== Personal life and death ==
Boyce met his wife Kathryn E. Davis while they were both studying at the University of Wisconsin. They were married on June 11, 1949. They moved to Nashville, Indiana, in Brown County in 1951. In 1954 they had a son, Charles. In 1956 the family moved to Indianapolis, Indiana. In 1966 the family moved to Morgantown, Indiana, where he built a home, and later, a second home across the road with a ceramics art studio.

Boyce was the curator of Art at the University of Indianapolis at the time of his passing. He was delivering artwork to Chicago and died from a heart attack in his hotel room on December 15, 1999, at the age of 73. He is buried at the East Hill Cemetery in Morgantown, Indiana.
