= Roswell J. Morgan =

American politician (1867–1958)

Roswell J. Morgan (August 29, 1867 – February 3, 1958) was an American politician. He was a member of the Wisconsin State Assembly.

== Biography ==
Morgan was born on August 29, 1867, in Embarrass, Wisconsin. He would later reside in Langlade County, Wisconsin.

Morgan died on February 3, 1958, in Berkeley, California, at the age of 90.

== Career ==
Morgan was a member of the Assembly during the 1903 session. He was a Republican.
