= Elmwood Park, Wisconsin =

- Village
- Location of Elmwood Park in Racine County, Wisconsin.
- Coordinates: 42°41′29″N 87°49′20″W
- Country: United States
- State: Wisconsin
- County: Racine

Government
  - Type: Village Board of Trustees
  - Village President: Alicia Gasser
  - Village Administrator: Lateria Shaw
  - Village Clerk/Treasurer: Kendal Barriere

Area
  - Total: 0.15 sq mi (0.40 km^{2})
  - Land: 0.15 sq mi (0.39 km^{2})
  - Water: 0.0039 sq mi (0.01 km^{2})
- Elevation: 646 ft (197 m)

Population (2020)
  - Total: 510
  - Density: 3,273.1/sq mi (1,263.76/km^{2})
- Time zone: UTC-6 (Central (CST))
  - Summer (DST): UTC-5 (CDT)
- Area code: 262
- FIPS code: 55-23725
- GNIS feature ID: 1584498
- Website: https://elmwoodparkwi.gov/

Elmwood Park is a village in Racine County, Wisconsin, United States. The population was 510 at the 2020 census.

== Geography ==
Elmwood Park is located at 42°41′29″N 87°49′20″W (42.691319, -87.822167).

According to the United States Census Bureau, the village has a total area of 0.14 square miles (0.36 km^{2}), all land.

== Demographics ==
Historical population
Census	Pop.	Note	%±
1970	456		—
1980	483		5.9%
1990	534		10.6%
2000	474		−11.2%
2010	497		4.9%
2020	510		2.6%
U.S. Decennial Census

=== 2010 census ===
As of the census of 2010, there were 497 people, 197 households, and 152 families living in the village. The population density was 3,550.0 inhabitants per square mile (1,370.7/km^{2}). There were 203 housing units at an average density of 1,450.0 per square mile (559.8/km^{2}). The racial makeup of the village was 90.5% White, 4.2% African American, 0.2% Native American, 2.4% Asian, 1.8% from other races, and 0.8% from two or more races. Hispanic or Latino of any race were 5.0% of the population.

There were 197 households, of which 26.9% had children under the age of 18 living with them, 66.5% were married couples living together, 6.6% had a female householder with no husband present, 4.1% had a male householder with no wife present, and 22.8% were non-families. 17.3% of all households were made up of individuals, and 10.6% had someone living alone who was 65 years of age or older. The average household size was 2.52 and the average family size was 2.87.

The median age in the village was 48.9 years. 22.3% of residents were under the age of 18; 4.3% were between the ages of 18 and 24; 18.5% were from 25 to 44; 34.4% were from 45 to 64; and 20.3% were 65 years of age or older. The gender makeup of the village was 49.9% male and 50.1% female.

=== 2000 census ===
As of the census of 2000, there were 474 people, 200 households, and 147 families living in the village. The population density was 3,205.8 people per square mile (1,220.1/km^{2}). There were 204 housing units at an average density of 1,379.7 per square mile (525.1/km^{2}). The racial makeup of the village was 96.62% White and 3.38% African American. Hispanic or Latino of any race were 1.27% of the population.

There were 200 households, out of which 23.0% had children under the age of 18 living with them, 67.0% were married couples living together, 5.5% had a female householder with no husband present, and 26.5% were non-families. 22.0% of all households were made up of individuals, and 11.0% had someone living alone who was 65 years of age or older. The average household size was 2.37 and the average family size was 2.76.

In the village, the population was spread out, with 17.7% under the age of 18, 5.9% from 18 to 24, 20.9% from 25 to 44, 37.8% from 45 to 64, and 17.7% who were 65 years of age or older. The median age was 48 years. For every 100 females, there were 100.0 males. For every 100 females age 18 and over, there were 92.1 males.

The median income for a household in the village was $71,389, and the median income for a family was $74,205. Males had a median income of $48,750 versus $30,833 for females. The per capita income for the village was $30,551. None of the families and 1.6% of the population were living below the poverty line, including no under eighteens and 2.6% of those over 64.

== Public safety ==
Law enforcement services are contracted with the Racine County Sheriff's Office. Fire protection and ambulance service is provided by South Shore Fire Department.

== Governance ==
Since its inception, the Village of Elmwood Park has been governed by a Village Board of six Trustees, a Village President, and a hired Clerk/Treasurer. In 2018, the Village Board created the Village Administrator position, which handed much of the responsibilities handled by the Village Board to the Administrator. This position was combined with the Clerk/Treasurer. In 2022, the Village Board voted to separate the roles of Village Administrator and Clerk Treasurer.
