= Embarrass, Wisconsin =

- Village
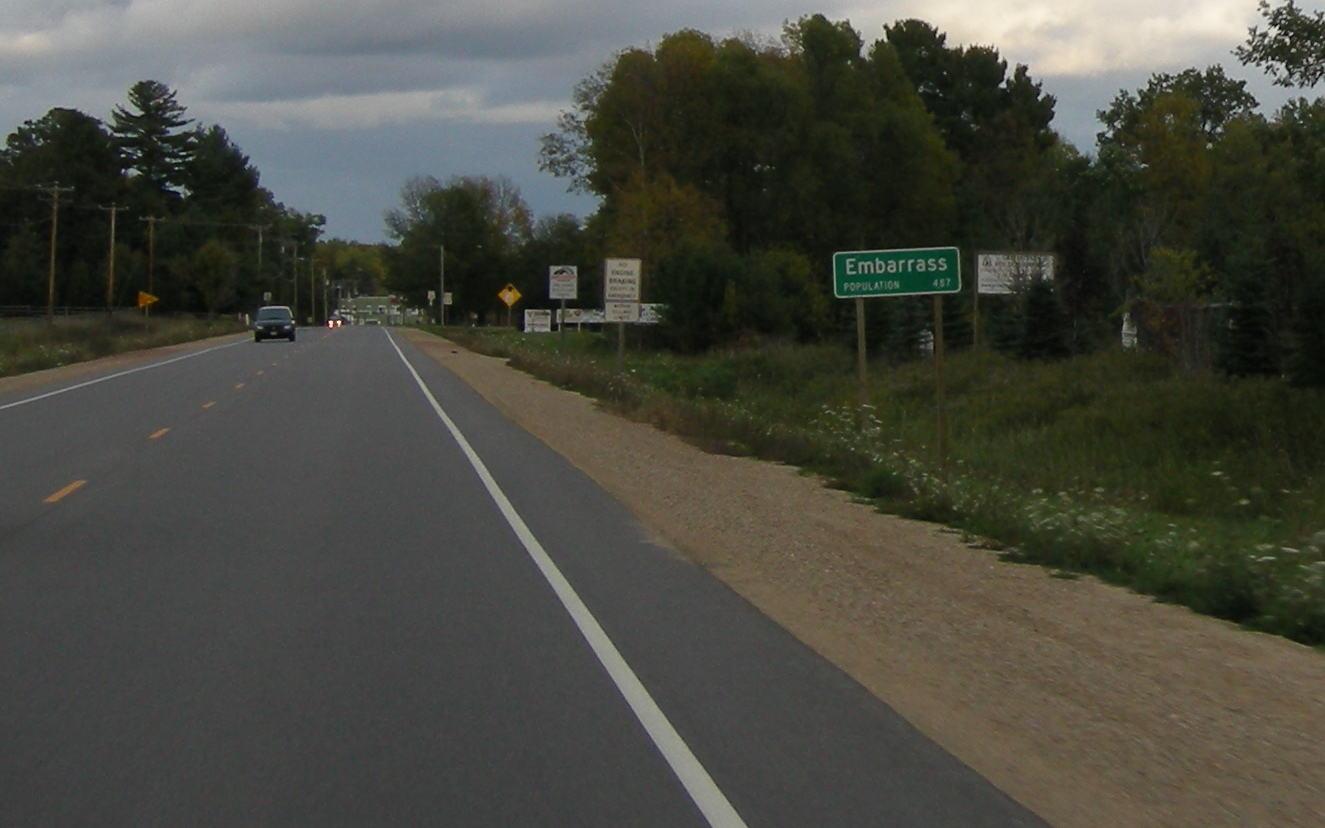
- Sign for Embarrass

- Location of Embarrass in Waupaca County, Wisconsin.
- Coordinates: 44°40′15″N 88°42′12″W
- Country: United States
- State: Wisconsin
- County: Waupaca

Area
  - Total: 1.19 sq mi (3.09 km^{2})
  - Land: 1.17 sq mi (3.03 km^{2})
  - Water: 0.023 sq mi (0.06 km^{2})
- Elevation: 804 ft (245 m)

Population (2020)
  - Total: 353
  - Density: 302/sq mi (117/km^{2})
- Time zone: UTC-6 (Central (CST))
  - Summer (DST): UTC-5 (CDT)
- FIPS code: 55-23850
- GNIS feature ID: 1564607

Embarrass is a village in Waupaca County, Wisconsin, United States. The population was 353 at the 2020 census.

== Geography ==
Embarrass is located at 44°40′15″N 88°42′12″W (44.670716, -88.703361).

The village is located about halfway between Clintonville, and Shawano on Wisconsin State Highway 22.

According to the United States Census Bureau, the village has a total area of 1.19 square miles (3.08 km^{2}), of which 1.17 square miles (3.03 km^{2}) is land and 0.02 square miles (0.05 km^{2}) is water.

== Name ==
Many of the early lumberjacks in the town were French Canadians. When they tried to send logs down the river they found it almost impossible because of the many snags and other debris, so they named it the Riviere Embarrase, embarrase being a French word meaning to impede, to obstruct, or to entangle.

== Demographics ==
Historical population
Census	Pop.	Note	%±
1880	61		—
1900	270		—
1910	283		4.8%
1920	296		4.6%
1930	256		−13.5%
1940	335		30.9%
1950	303		−9.6%
1960	306		1.0%
1970	472		54.2%
1980	496		5.1%
1990	461		−7.1%
2000	399		−13.4%
2010	404		1.3%
2020	353		−12.6%
U.S. Decennial Census

=== 2010 census ===
As of the census of 2010, there were 404 people, 144 households, and 102 families living in the village. The population density was 345.3 inhabitants per square mile (133.3/km^{2}). There were 151 housing units at an average density of 129.1 per square mile (49.8/km^{2}). The racial makeup of the village was 97.0% White, 0.5% African American, 1.0% Native American, 0.7% from other races, and 0.7% from two or more races. Hispanic or Latino of any race were 0.7% of the population.

There were 144 households, of which 23.6% had children under the age of 18 living with them, 59.7% were married couples living together, 8.3% had a female householder with no husband present, 2.8% had a male householder with no wife present, and 29.2% were non-families. 26.4% of all households were made up of individuals, and 15.9% had someone living alone who was 65 years of age or older. The average household size was 2.37 and the average family size was 2.82.

The median age in the village was 49.5 years. 18.3% of residents were under the age of 18; 6.4% were between the ages of 18 and 24; 18.1% were from 25 to 44; 25.8% were from 45 to 64; and 31.4% were 65 years of age or older. The gender makeup of the village was 53.2% male and 46.8% female.

=== 2000 census ===
As of the census of 2000, there were 389 people, 156 households, and 117 families living in the village. The population density was 331.5 people per square mile (128.4/km^{2}). There were 164 housing units at an average density of 136.2 per square mile (52.8/km^{2}). The racial makeup of the village was 100.00% White. Hispanic or Latino of any race were 0.75% of the population.

There were 156 households, out of which 31.4% had children under the age of 18 living with them, 70.5% were married couples living together, 1.9% had a female householder with no husband present, and 25.0% were non-families. 19.2% of all households were made up of individuals, and 12.2% had someone living alone who was 65 years of age or older. The average household size was 2.56 and the average family size was 2.97.

In the village, the population was spread out, with 24.1% under the age of 18, 6.5% from 18 to 24, 29.1% from 25 to 44, 23.3% from 45 to 64, and 17.0% who were 65 years of age or older. The median age was 39 years. For every 100 females, there were 108.9 males. For every 100 females age 18 and over, there were 110.4 males.

The median income for a household in the village was $42,500, and the median income for a family was $46,875. Males had a median income of $29,091 versus $21,042 for females. The per capita income for the village was $16,932. About 1.8% of families and 3.2% of the population were below the poverty line, including none of those under age 18 and 16.1% of those age 65 or over.

== Notable people ==
- Roswell J. Morgan (1867-1958), a member of the Wisconsin State Assembly.
- Gerald G. Boyce (1925-1999), artist and educator.
