= North Bay, Wisconsin =

- Village
- Location of North Bay in Racine County, Wisconsin.
- Coordinates: 42°45′54″N 87°46′51″W
- Country: United States
- State: Wisconsin
- County: Racine

Area
  - Total: 0.10 sq mi (0.27 km^{2})
  - Land: 0.10 sq mi (0.27 km^{2})
  - Water: 0 sq mi (0.00 km^{2})
- Elevation: 607 ft (185 m)

Population (2020)
  - Total: 209
  - Density: 2,220/sq mi (857.2/km^{2})
- Time zone: UTC-6 (Central (CST))
  - Summer (DST): UTC-5 (CDT)
- Area code: 262
- FIPS code: 55-57700
- GNIS feature ID: 1570353
- Website: https://northbay-wi.us/

North Bay is a village in Racine County, Wisconsin, United States. The population was 209 at the 2020 census.

== Geography ==
North Bay is located at 42°45′54″N 87°46′51″W (42.764869, -87.780849).

According to the United States Census Bureau, the village has a total area of 0.12 square miles (0.31 km^{2}), of which 0.10 square miles (0.26 km^{2}) is land and 0.02 square miles (0.05 km^{2}) is water.

== Demographics ==
Historical population
Census	Pop.	Note	%±
1960	264		—
1970	263		−0.4%
1980	219		−16.7%
1990	246		12.3%
2000	260		5.7%
2010	241		−7.3%
2020	209		−13.3%
U.S. Decennial Census

=== 2010 census ===
As of the census of 2010, there were 241 people, 91 households, and 77 families living in the village. The population density was 2,410.0 inhabitants per square mile (930.5/km^{2}). There were 97 housing units at an average density of 970.0 per square mile (374.5/km^{2}). The racial makeup of the village was 94.2% White, 2.9% African American, 1.2% Asian, 0.8% from other races, and 0.8% from two or more races. Hispanic or Latino of any race were 6.6% of the population.

There were 91 households, of which 33.0% had children under the age of 18 living with them, 80.2% were married couples living together, 4.4% had a female householder with no husband present, and 15.4% were non-families. 15.4% of all households were made up of individuals, and 6.6% had someone living alone who was 65 years of age or older. The average household size was 2.65 and the average family size was 2.94.

The median age in the village was 50.1 years. 24.5% of residents were under the age of 18; 4.2% were between the ages of 18 and 24; 11.2% were from 25 to 44; 43.6% were from 45 to 64; and 16.6% were 65 years of age or older. The gender makeup of the village was 51.9% male and 48.1% female.

=== 2000 census ===
As of the census of 2000, there were 260 people, 91 households, and 73 families living in the village. The population density was 2,429.9 people per square mile (912.6/km^{2}). There were 95 housing units at an average density of 887.8 per square mile (333.5/km^{2}). The racial makeup of the village was 91.54% White, 4.62% African American, 0.38% from other races, and 3.46% from two or more races. Hispanic or Latino of any race were 5.77% of the population.

There were 91 households, out of which 41.8% had children under the age of 18 living with them, 80.2% were married couples living together, 1.1% had a female householder with no husband present, and 18.7% were non-families. 17.6% of all households were made up of individuals, and 9.9% had someone living alone who was 65 years of age or older. The average household size was 2.86 and the average family size was 3.27.

In the village, the population was spread out, with 31.5% under the age of 18, 3.1% from 18 to 24, 21.5% from 25 to 44, 31.2% from 45 to 64, and 12.7% who were 65 years of age or older. The median age was 42 years. For every 100 females, there were 100.0 males. For every 100 females age 18 and over, there were 95.6 males.

The median income for a household in the village was $97,943, and the median income for a family was $118,459. Males had a median income of $83,069 versus $33,750 for females. The per capita income for the village was $51,898. None of the families and 0.8% of the population were living below the poverty line, including no under eighteens and 5.9% of those over 64.

== Education ==
North Bay is part of the Racine Unified School District.

Zoned schools serving the village include Jerstad-Agerholm K-8 School for both elementary and middle school levels, and Horlick High School.
