= Fenwood, Wisconsin =

- Village
- Location of Fenwood in Marathon County, Wisconsin.
- Coordinates: 44°51′56″N 90°0′50″W
- Country: United States
- State: Wisconsin
- County: Marathon

Area
  - Total: 0.98 sq mi (2.55 km^{2})
  - Land: 0.98 sq mi (2.55 km^{2})
  - Water: 0 sq mi (0.00 km^{2})
- Elevation: 1,296 ft (395 m)

Population (2020)
  - Total: 141
  - Density: 143/sq mi (55.3/km^{2})
- Time zone: UTC-6 (Central (CST))
  - Summer (DST): UTC-5 (CDT)
- Area codes: 715 & 534
- FIPS code: 55-25650
- GNIS feature ID: 1564913

Fenwood is a village in Marathon County, Wisconsin, United States. It is part of the Wausau, Wisconsin Metropolitan Statistical Area. The population was 141 at the 2020 census.

== History ==
Fenwood was platted by the railroad in 1891. It was named from woods near the townsite at a fen, or marshy area. A post office was established at Fenwood in 1892, and remained in operation until it was discontinued in 1984.

The village of Fenwood, Marathon Co., Wisconsin was platted by Alfred L. Carey, the attorney for the Milwaukee, Lake Shore & Western Railroad, November 18, 1891, about the time when that railroad struck the place; it was incorporated as a village from part of the town of Wien, April 16, 1904, and its first representative in the county board of Marathon county was W. A. Somers. At the time the railroad struck the place, C. S. Curtis of Wausau erected a large saw mill, which was in operation until 1910, when it ceased sawing. At that time there was a large profitable cheese factory in the village, owned and supplied by farmers in the towns of Wien and Cleveland. John Brinkmann and Emil Szebsdat, under firm name of Brinkmann & Szeljsdat owned a general store, and George Wetterau kept the tavern or hotel in the village. Emil Szebsdat was also the village postmaster.

There was a nice state-graded frame schoolhouse with two “departments”: principal, Vallborg Hermanson, and assistant principal, Miss Gertrude Kurtzweil - an average attendance of forty-five pupils in both departments. There were two German Evangelical Lutheran congregations, holding their services in the schoolhouse and attended by the resident ministers of the town of Wien. https://wiclarkcountyhistory.org/neighbors/marathon/history/1913FenwoodHistory.htm

In 1911, the R. Connor Company of Marshfield, with its Marathon County mill located at Stratford, set to work clear- ing two sections of land four miles southeast of the village. This project, no doubt, had much to do in checking the out- ward flow of workmen and gave fresh energy to the entire community. A spur track extending from the mainline to Connor's woods provided an easy and rapid means of trans- porting logs from camp to the mill. The cut of 1913 climaxed the Connor harvest at this location and that season, two million feet of logs were decked at one time at their rollway. For several years more timbers were hauled into Fenwood from a 500-acre tract. This work was contracted by John Wetterau and was finished in 1928. These intermittent and spasmodic shipments marked the ex- piration of the industry which had given birth to the village. At one time the Chrouser Saw and Tie Mill was also in operation in Fenwood. This mill was operated by George Chrouser from 1908 until the late 1920s. The Fenwood mill was a branch of the Chrouser mill in Stratford. It consisted mainly in making ties for the railroad and custom sawing for area people. In the early 1900s, Fenwood was a booming lumber town. Proof of Fenwood's past prominence as a lumbering center is mutely evidenced today by unused and unusable logging roads. These keep an endless vigil against a time, never to come, when again one can hear the droning music of a saw punctuated by staccato notes as steel meets steel, in the rhythmic swings of lumberjacks, the dying symphony of the north woods. (This history of Fenwood was compiled by Lillian Bau- man using many histories and newspaper articles from area newspapers.) Early Fenwood. Photograph on loan from Delbert Wetterau. https://digicoll.library.wisc.edu/cgi-bin/WI/WI-idx?type=turn&id=WI.Fenwood&entity=WI.Fenwood.p0012&isize=text

== Geography ==
Fenwood is located at 44°51′56″N 90°0′50″W (44.865483, -90.013757).

According to the United States Census Bureau, the village has a total area of 0.99 square miles (2.56 km^{2}), all land.

== Demographics ==
Historical population
Census	Pop.	Note	%±
1910	220		—
1920	178		−19.1%
1930	136		−23.6%
1940	156		14.7%
1950	139		−10.9%
1960	147		5.8%
1970	147		0.0%
1980	165		12.2%
1990	214		29.7%
2000	174		−18.7%
2010	152		−12.6%
2020	141		−7.2%
U.S. Decennial Census

=== 2010 census ===
As of the census of 2010, there were 152 people, 64 households, and 43 families living in the village. The population density was 153.5 inhabitants per square mile (59.3/km^{2}). There were 67 housing units at an average density of 67.7 per square mile (26.1/km^{2}). The racial makeup of the village was 97.4% White, 0.7% from other races, and 2.0% from two or more races. Hispanic or Latino of any race were 2.6% of the population.

There were 64 households, of which 31.3% had children under the age of 18 living with them, 54.7% were married couples living together, 4.7% had a female householder with no husband present, 7.8% had a male householder with no wife present, and 32.8% were non-families. 26.6% of all households were made up of individuals, and 9.4% had someone living alone who was 65 years of age or older. The average household size was 2.38 and the average family size was 2.84.

The median age in the village was 41 years. 19.7% of residents were under the age of 18; 8.6% were between the ages of 18 and 24; 25% were from 25 to 44; 38.1% were from 45 to 64; and 8.6% were 65 years of age or older. The gender makeup of the village was 52.6% male and 47.4% female.

=== 2000 census ===
As of the census of 2000, there were 174 people, 61 households, and 46 families living in the village. The population density was 176.7 people per square mile (68.6/km^{2}). There were 63 housing units at an average density of 64.0 per square mile (24.8/km^{2}). The racial makeup of the village was 100.00% White.

There were 61 households, out of which 39.3% had children under the age of 18 living with them, 67.2% were married couples living together, 4.9% had a female householder with no husband present, and 23.0% were non-families. 19.7% of all households were made up of individuals, and 14.8% had someone living alone who was 65 years of age or older. The average household size was 2.85 and the average family size was 3.32.

In the village, the population was spread out, with 25.3% under the age of 18, 17.8% from 18 to 24, 25.9% from 25 to 44, 14.9% from 45 to 64, and 16.1% who were 65 years of age or older. The median age was 32 years. For every 100 females, there were 104.7 males. For every 100 females age 18 and over, there were 106.3 males.

The median income for a household in the village was $44,000, and the median income for a family was $48,750. Males had a median income of $32,500 versus $17,679 for females. The per capita income for the village was $15,920. None of the population or families were below the poverty line.
