= Fox Valley Classic Conference =

Wisconsin high school football conference (Spring 2021)

The Fox Valley Classic Conference was a high school football conference that was formed for the spring 2021 alternate football season in Wisconsin. Containing members in northeastern and north central Wisconsin, the conference and its member schools were affiliated with the Wisconsin Interscholastic Athletic Association.

== History ==
In the wake of the COVID-19 global pandemic, several major high school football conferences in Wisconsin canceled their 2020 fall seasonal schedules. Among these conferences were the Fox River Classic Conference and the Fox Valley Association. Eighteen schools associated with these two conferences, along with Appleton West and Stevens Point of the Wisconsin Valley Conference, formed an alliance for the spring 2021 alternate football season. Members were partitioned into four five-team divisions, and the conference was dissolved when its members returned to fall football for the 2021-22 school year.

== Conference membership history ==
School	Location	Affiliation	Mascot	Colors	Division	Conference Joined (Fall 2021)
Appleton East	Appleton, WI	Public	Patriots		B	Fox Valley Association
Appleton North	Appleton, WI	Public	Lightning		B	Fox Valley Association
Appleton West	Appleton, WI	Public	Terrors		C	Wisconsin Valley
Ashwaubenon	Ashwaubenon, WI	Public	Jaguars		B	Fox River Classic
Bay Port	Suamico, WI	Public	Pirates		A	Fox River Classic
De Pere	De Pere, WI	Public	Redbirds		C	Fox River Classic
Fond du Lac	Fond du Lac, WI	Public	Cardinals		A	Fox Valley Association
Green Bay East	Green Bay, WI	Public	Red Devils		D	Fox River Classic
Green Bay Preble	Green Bay, WI	Public	Hornets		A	Fox River Classic
Green Bay Southwest	Green Bay, WI	Public	Trojans		C	Fox River Classic
Green Bay West	Green Bay, WI	Public	Wildcats		D	Fox River Classic
Kimberly	Kimberly, WI	Public	Papermakers		B	Fox Valley Association
Manitowoc Lincoln	Manitowoc, WI	Public	Ships		C	Fox River Classic
Neenah	Neenah, WI	Public	Rockets		A	Fox Valley Association
Oshkosh North	Oshkosh, WI	Public	Spartans		D	Fox Valley Association
Oshkosh West	Oshkosh, WI	Public	Wildcats		C	Fox Valley Association
Pulaski	Pulaski, WI	Public	Red Raiders		B	Fox River Classic
Sheboygan North	Sheboygan, WI	Public	Golden Raiders		D	Fox River Classic
Sheboygan South	Sheboygan, WI	Public	Redwings		D	Fox River Classic
Stevens Point	Stevens Point, WI	Public	Panthers		A	Wisconsin Valley

== Final standings ==
Division A
School	Conference			Overall		
School	W	L	T	W	L	T
Fond du Lac	4	0	0	7	0	0
Neenah	2	2	0	3	4	0
Bay Port	2	2	0	2	5	0
Stevens Point	2	2	0	3	4	0
Green Bay Preble	0	4	0	2	5	0

Division B
School	Conference			Overall		
School	W	L	T	W	L	T
Kimberly	4	0	0	6	1	0
Appleton North	3	1	0	5	2	0
Pulaski	2	2	0	4	2	0
Appleton East	1	3	0	4	3	0
Ashwaubenon	0	4	0	3	4	0

Division C
School	Conference			Overall		
School	W	L	T	W	L	T
De Pere	5	0	0	7	0	0
Oshkosh West	3	2	0	4	3	0
Appleton West	2	3	0	4	4	0
Manitowoc Lincoln	1	3	0	2	6	0
Green Bay Southwest	1	4	0	1	6	0

Division D
School	Conference			Overall		
School	W	L	T	W	L	T
Oshkosh North	4	0	0	4	2	0
Sheboygan North	3	1	0	3	4	0
Sheboygan South	2	2	0	2	3	0
Green Bay East	1	3	0	1	6	0
Green Bay West	0	4	0	0	4	0
