= Mid-Valley Conference =

Wisconsin high school athletic conference (1946-1950)

The Mid-Valley Conference is a former high school athletic conference in northeastern Wisconsin. Founded in 1946 and disbanded in 1950, the conference and its members were affiliated with the Wisconsin Interscholastic Athletic Association.

== History ==
Location of Original Mid-Valley Conference Members

The Mid-Valley Conference was formed in 1946 by seven small- to medium-sized high schools in the Fox River Valley in northeastern Wisconsin: Bonduel, Chilton, Kimberly, Kiel, Pulaski, Seymour, and West De Pere. Three of the seven members previously competed as independents (Bonduel, Pulaski and West De Pere) and the other four maintained dual memberships in other conferences: two in the Eastern Wisconsin Conference (Chilton and Kiel) and two in the Little Nine Conference (Kimberly and Seymour). Chilton and Kiel, the two southernmost schools, remained football-only members for the 1947 season, but left afterwards for sole membership in the Eastern Wisconsin Conference. Kimberly maintained a dual membership in all sports with the exception of basketball.

The Mid-Valley Conference lasted for four years before it was disbanded in 1950. Kimberly and Seymour joined the Northeastern Wisconsin Conference after leaving both the Mid-Valley and Little Nine Conferences. Bonduel, Pulaski and West De Pere returned to independent status for one season before entering the Central Wisconsin Conference (Bonduel) and the Northeastern Wisconsin Conference (Pulaski and West De Pere) in 1951.

== Conference membership history ==
=== Final members ===
School	Location	Affiliation	Mascot	Colors	Joined	Left	Conference Joined	Current Conference
Bonduel	Bonduel, WI	Public	Bears		1946	1950	Independent	Central Wisconsin
Kimberly	Kimberly, WI	Public	Papermakers		1946	1950	Northeastern Wisconsin	Fox Valley Association
Pulaski	Pulaski, WI	Public	Red Raiders		1946	1950	Independent	Fox River Classic
Seymour	Seymour, WI	Public	Indians		1946	1950	Northeastern Wisconsin	Bay
West De Pere	De Pere, WI	Public	Phantoms		1946	1950	Independent	Fox River Classic

=== Previous members ===
School	Location	Affiliation	Mascot	Colors	Joined	Left	Conference Joined	Current Conference
Chilton	Chilton, WI	Public	Tigers		1946	1947	Eastern Wisconsin	
Kiel	Kiel, WI	Public	Raiders		1946	1947	Eastern Wisconsin	

== List of conference champions ==
=== Boys Basketball ===
School	Quantity	Years
West De Pere	2	1947, 1948
Bonduel	1	1949
Seymour	1	1950
Chilton	0	
Kiel	0	
Kimberly	0	
Pulaski	0	

=== Football ===
School	Quantity	Years
West De Pere	3	1946, 1947, 1948
Kimberly	2	1946, 1949
Bonduel	0	
Chilton	0	
Kiel	0	
Pulaski	0	
Seymour	0	
