= Northeastern Wisconsin Conference =

Wisconsin high school athletic conference (1927-1970)

The Northeastern Wisconsin Conference is a former high school athletic conference in Wisconsin, opening competition in 1927 and disbanding in 1970. Its members were concentrated in the northeastern part of the state, and all members were affiliated with the Wisconsin Interscholastic Athletic Association.

== History ==
=== 1927–1933 ===
Location of Original Northeastern Wisconsin Conference Members

The Northeastern Wisconsin (NEW) Conference was formed in 1927 by thirteen small- to medium-sized high schools in northeastern Wisconsin. Algoma, Clintonville, De Pere, Kaukauna, Kewaunee, Menasha, Neenah, New London, Oconto, Oconto Falls, Shawano, Sturgeon Bay and West De Pere were charter members. Gillett and Two Rivers joined the conference before the 1927 football season to give the NEW Conference fifteen members. The conference had a large geographic footprint, including schools in nine counties (Brown, Door, Kewaunee, Manitowoc, Oconto, Outagamie, Shawano, Waupaca and Winnebago). Four years after the NEW Conference's formation, Clintonville and Gillett left the conference, putting the membership tally at thirteen schools.

=== 1933–1952 ===
In 1933, the NEW Conference split its thirteen member schools into Eastern and Western Divisions:

Eastern Division	Western Division
Algoma	Kaukauna
De Pere	Menasha
Kewaunee	Neenah
Oconto	New London
Oconto Falls	Shawano
Sturgeon Bay	West De Pere
Two Rivers	

Clintonville rejoined the conference in 1934, and they took up residence in the Western Division, putting each division at seven members apiece. Conference membership remained stable for over a decade until West De Pere left the NEW Conference in 1943 to compete as an independent. Two Rivers moved from the Eastern to the Western Division in 1949, and the conference added two schools in 1950: Kimberly and Seymour. Both schools had recently left the Little Nine Conference in search of stronger competition, and both joined the Eastern Division for their first season in the NEW Conference. Kimberly switched to the Western Division in 1951, and the Eastern Division welcomed Pulaski and West De Pere. Both schools were formerly in the Mid-Valley Conference, and West De Pere was making its return after it left the NEW Conference eight years prior:

Eastern Division	Western Division
Algoma	Clintonville
De Pere	Kaukauna
Kewaunee	Kimberly
Oconto	Menasha
Oconto Falls	Neenah
Pulaski	New London
Seymour	Shawano
Sturgeon Bay	Two Rivers
West De Pere	

=== 1952–1966 ===
Location of Northeastern Wisconsin Conference Members (1956-1964)

In 1952, all eight schools in the Northeastern Wisconsin Conference's Western Division left to form the Mid-Eastern Conference. The remaining nine schools in the Eastern Division of the NEW Conference continued on as a nine-member circuit. Growth in the Green Bay metropolitan area and the opening of new high schools drove expansion of the NEW Conference in the 1950s and 1960s. Preble High School was opened in 1955 and joined the NEW Conference the next year, bringing membership to ten. In 1964, Preble left the NEW Conference after their school district was consolidated into Green Bay's school district. They joined their new brethren with the larger schools of the Fox River Valley Conference and were replaced by Bonduel, formerly of the Central Wisconsin Conference. Two recently opened high schools joined the NEW Conference in 1966 to bring membership to twelve schools: Ashwaubenon High School and Bay Port High School of the Howard-Suamico district.

=== 1966–1970 ===
Location of Final Northeastern Wisconsin Conference Members

The Northeastern Wisconsin Conference would continue with twelve member schools for the next four years before a major realignment occurred in the region. Several conferences were disbanded that year, and the NEW Conference was one of them. Eight of the twelve former NEW Conference schools, along with Clintonville of the Mid-Eastern Conference and former independent Marinette, formed the new Bay Conference: Ashwaubenon, Bay Port, De Pere, Oconto, Oconto Falls, Pulaski, Seymour and West De Pere. Three of the smaller schools (Algoma, Kewaunee and Sturgeon Bay) became charter members of the Packerland Conference and Bonduel returned to the Central Wisconsin Conference after leaving six years prior.

== Conference membership history ==
=== Final members ===
School	Location	Affiliation	Mascot	Colors	Joined	Left	Conference Joined	Current Conference
Algoma	Algoma, WI	Public	Wolves		1927	1970	Packerland	
Ashwaubenon	Ashwaubenon, WI	Public	Jaguars		1966	1970	Bay	Fox River Classic
Bay Port	Suamico, WI	Public	Pirates		1966	1970	Bay	Fox River Classic
Bonduel	Bonduel, WI	Public	Bears		1964	1970	Central Wisconsin	
De Pere	De Pere, WI	Public	Redbirds		1927	1970	Bay	Fox River Classic
Kewaunee	Kewaunee, WI	Public	Indians		1927	1970	Packerland	
Oconto	Oconto, WI	Public	Blue Devils		1927	1970	Bay	Packerland
Oconto Falls	Oconto Falls, WI	Public	Panthers		1927	1970	Bay	North Eastern
Pulaski	Pulaski, WI	Public	Red Raiders		1951	1970	Bay	Fox River Classic
Seymour	Seymour, WI	Public	Indians		1950	1970	Bay	
Sturgeon Bay	Sturgeon Bay, WI	Public	Clippers		1927	1970	Packerland	
West De Pere	De Pere, WI	Public	Phantoms		1927, 1951	1943, 1970	Bay	Fox River Classic

=== Previous members ===
School	Location	Affiliation	Mascot	Colors	Joined	Left	Conference Joined	Current Conference
Clintonville	Clintonville, WI	Public	Truckers		1927, 1934	1931, 1952	Mid-Eastern	North Eastern
Gillett	Gillett, WI	Public	Tigers		1927	1931	Independent	Marinette & Oconto
Kaukauna	Kaukauna, WI	Public	Galloping Ghosts		1927	1952	Mid-Eastern	Fox Valley Association
Kimberly	Kimberly, WI	Public	Papermakers		1950	1952	Mid-Eastern	Fox Valley Association
Menasha	Menasha, WI	Public	Blue Jays		1927	1952	Mid-Eastern	Bay
Neenah	Neenah, WI	Public	Rockets		1927	1952	Mid-Eastern	Fox Valley Association
New London	New London, WI	Public	Bulldogs		1927	1952	Mid-Eastern	Bay
Preble	Preble, WI	Public	Hornets		1956	1964	Fox River Valley	Fox River Classic
Shawano	Shawano, WI	Public	Indians		1927	1952	Mid-Eastern	Bay
Two Rivers	Two Rivers, WI	Public	Raiders		1927	1952	Mid-Eastern	Eastern Wisconsin

== Membership timeline ==
Eastern Division Western Division

== List of state champions ==
=== Fall sports ===
None

=== Winter sports ===
Boys Basketball
School	Year	Division
Neenah	1930	Single Division
De Pere	1934	Class B
Shawano	1938	Class B
Shawano	1940	Single Division
Two Rivers	1941	Single Division

Skiing
School	Year	Division
Sturgeon Bay	1968	Single Division

=== Spring sports ===
Baseball
School	Year	Division
Menasha	1950	Single Division

Boys Tennis
School	Year	Division
Shawano	1939	Single Division
Shawano	1940	Single Division
Shawano	1941	Single Division
Neenah	1946	Single Division
Neenah	1951	Single Division

Boys Track & Field
School	Year	Division
Shawano	1936	Class B
Sturgeon Bay	1959	Class B

== List of conference champions ==
=== Boys Basketball ===
School	Quantity	Years
Shawano	11	1933, 1935, 1936, 1937, 1938, 1939, 1940, 1942, 1944, 1950, 1952
Neenah	11	1928, 1929, 1930, 1932, 1939, 1940, 1943, 1945, 1946, 1949, 1951
Kewaunee	9	1931, 1936, 1945, 1946, 1954, 1960, 1962, 1963, 1970
Algoma	7	1945, 1949, 1951, 1955, 1964, 1965, 1967
Two Rivers	7	1937, 1938, 1940, 1941, 1944, 1948, 1950
West De Pere	7	1952, 1953, 1954, 1956, 1961, 1965, 1966
Menasha	5	1934, 1946, 1947, 1948, 1951
Oconto	5	1930, 1933, 1939, 1947, 1948
De Pere	4	1932, 1934, 1942, 1967
Sturgeon Bay	4	1935, 1954, 1967, 1968
Oconto Falls	3	1957, 1958, 1969
Preble	2	1958, 1959
Kaukauna	1	1941
New London	1	1940
Ashwaubenon	0	
Bay Port	0	
Bonduel	0	
Clintonville	0	
Gillett	0	
Kimberly	0	
Pulaski	0	
Seymour	0	

=== Football ===
School	Quantity	Years
Kaukauna	17	1927, 1928, 1930, 1932, 1934, 1936, 1938, 1939, 1940, 1941, 1942, 1944, 1945, 1946, 1948, 1949, 1950
Sturgeon Bay	10	1936, 1937, 1939, 1940, 1949, 1950, 1959, 1960, 1961, 1968
West De Pere	8	1929, 1952, 1953, 1954, 1955, 1963, 1965, 1966
De Pere	7	1932, 1933, 1938, 1941, 1958, 1961, 1964
Two Rivers	7	1941, 1942, 1944, 1945, 1946, 1947, 1948
Kewaunee	5	1935, 1951, 1952, 1968, 1969
Preble	5	1956, 1957, 1958, 1961, 1962
Menasha	4	1931, 1933, 1941, 1951
Shawano	3	1935, 1937, 1943
Clintonville	2	1947, 1950
Oconto Falls	2	1952, 1967
Pulaski	2	1952, 1955
Algoma	1	1950
Oconto	1	1934
Seymour	1	1952
Ashwaubenon	0	
Bay Port	0	
Bonduel	0	
Gillett	0	
Kimberly	0	
Neenah	0	
New London	0	
