= Fox River Valley Conference =

Wisconsin high school athletic conference (1923-2007)

- Conference: WIAA
- Founded: 1923
- Folded: 2007
- No. of teams: 8 (Final) 15 (Total)

The Fox River Valley Conference, or FRVC, is a former high school athletic conference in northeastern Wisconsin. Founded in 1923 and disbanded in 2007, the conference and its member schools were affiliated with the Wisconsin Interscholastic Athletic Association.

== History ==
=== 1923–1970 ===
Location of Original Fox River Valley Conference Members
Location of Fox River Valley Conference Members (1968-1970)

The Fox River Valley Conference was established in 1923 by seven large high schools in northeastern Wisconsin: Appleton, Fond du Lac, Green Bay East, Green Bay West, Manitowoc, Oshkosh, and Sheboygan. A year later, Marinette joined the conference and remained as its eighth member until 1936. In 1938, Sheboygan renamed itself Sheboygan Central due to the upcoming 1939 opening of Sheboygan North. Their entry into the FRVC brought the membership roster back to eight schools. A minor change occurred in 1960 when Sheboygan Central (and its team name and records) changed its name to Sheboygan South due to the shift of population further from the center of Sheboygan. In 1964, Green Bay Southwest joined the conference followed by Green Bay Preble a year later, the latter having left the now-defunct NEW Conference after 1963. This brought the FRVC membership up to 10 schools. Four years later in 1967, Appleton East incorporated and joined the conference, prompting Appleton High School to change its name to Appleton West. Nearby Neenah High School moved over from the Mid-Eastern Conference the next year, leading the FRVC to peak at twelve member schools.

=== 1970–2006 ===
Location of Final Fox River Valley Conference Members

A major conference realignment happened in 1970 when Appleton East, Appleton West, Oshkosh, and Neenah left the conference to join up with Kaukauna, Kimberly, and Menasha, forming the Fox Valley Association. With the loss of four teams, the FRVC brought in Two Rivers, who would leave for football after the 1973 season, and for full membership in the Fox Valley Association in 1977. Membership stabilized until 1989, when Fond du Lac left the conference to join the Fox Valley Association for all sports except football, not leaving in full until the fall of 1993. Notre Dame Academy moved over from the WISAA-affiliated Fox Valley Christian Conference, keeping membership at eight schools. The FRVC ended at the conclusion of the 2006-07 school year, when the remaining schools joined Ashwaubenon, Bay Port, De Pere, and Pulaski to form the current Fox River Classic Conference. Of the original seven charter members, the only ones that remained were Green Bay East, Green Bay West, Manitowoc, and Sheboygan (now Sheboygan South).

== Conference membership history ==
=== Final members ===
School	Location	Affiliation	Mascot	Colors	Joined	Left	Conference Joined	Current Conference
Green Bay East	Green Bay, WI	Public	Red Devils		1923	2007	Fox River Classic	
Green Bay Preble	Green Bay, WI	Public	Hornets		1964	2007	Fox River Classic	
Green Bay Southwest	Green Bay, WI	Public	Trojans		1964	2007	Fox River Classic	
Green Bay West	Green Bay, WI	Public	Wildcats		1923	2007	Fox River Classic	
Manitowoc Lincoln	Manitowoc, WI	Public	Ships		1923	2007	Fox River Classic	
Notre Dame Academy	Green Bay, WI	Private (Catholic)	Tritons		1993	2007	Fox River Classic	
Sheboygan North	Sheboygan, WI	Public	Golden Raiders		1939	2007	Fox River Classic	
Sheboygan South	Sheboygan, WI	Public	Redwings		1923	2007	Fox River Classic	Glacier Trails

=== Previous members ===
School	Location	Affiliation	Mascot	Colors	Joined	Left	Conference Joined	Current Conference
Appleton East	Appleton, WI	Public	Patriots		1967	1970	Fox Valley Association	
Appleton West	Appleton, WI	Public	Terrors		1923	1970	Fox Valley Association	
Fond du Lac	Fond du Lac, WI	Public	Cardinals		1923	1989	Fox Valley Association	
Marinette	Marinette, WI	Public	Marines		1924	1936	Independent	North Eastern
Neenah	Neenah, WI	Public	Rockets		1968	1970	Fox Valley Association	
Oshkosh	Oshkosh, WI	Public	Indians		1923	1970	Fox Valley Association	
Two Rivers	Two Rivers, WI	Public	Purple Raiders		1970	1977	Fox Valley Association	Eastern Wisconsin

== List of state champions ==
=== Fall sports ===
Boys Cross Country
School	Year	Division
Manitowoc Lincoln	1929	Single Division
Green Bay Preble	1984	Class A

Girls Cross Country
School	Year	Division
Manitowoc Lincoln	1978	Class A

Football
School	Year	Division
Manitowoc Lincoln	1984	Division 1
Manitowoc Lincoln	1985	Division 1
Manitowoc Lincoln	1986	Division 1
Fond du Lac	1987	Division 1
Notre Dame Academy	2003	Division 3

Girls Golf
School	Year	Division
Fond du Lac	1978	Single Division
Notre Dame Academy	2006	Division 1

Boys Soccer
School	Year	Division
Notre Dame Academy	2001	Division 2

Girls Tennis
School	Year	Division
Green Bay Southwest	1997	Division 1
Notre Dame Academy	2002	Division 2
Notre Dame Academy	2003	Division 2

Girls Volleyball
School	Year	Division
Green Bay Preble	1991	Division 1

=== Winter sports ===
Boys Basketball
School	Year	Division
Fond du Lac	1924	Single Division
Manitowoc Lincoln	1963	Single Division
Manitowoc Lincoln	1968	Single Division
Appleton West	1970	Single Division
Sheboygan North	1986	Class A

Girls Basketball
School	Year	Division
Notre Dame Academy	2001	Division 2

Boys Gymnastics
School	Year
Green Bay Preble	1969
Green Bay Preble	1973
Green Bay Preble	1975
Green Bay Preble	1976
Green Bay Preble	1980

Girls Gymnastics
School	Year
Green Bay Preble	1971

=== Spring sports ===
Baseball
School	Year
Oshkosh	1954
Oshkosh	1956

Boys Golf
School	Year	Division
Fond du Lac	1971	Single Division
Fond du Lac	1975	Single Division
Sheboygan North	1986	Single Division
Sheboygan North	1992	Division 1
Notre Dame Academy	2007	Division 2

Boys Tennis
School	Year
Manitowoc Lincoln	1930
Oshkosh	1935
Manitowoc Lincoln	1936
Oshkosh	1937
Sheboygan	1938
Manitowoc Lincoln	1951
Fond du Lac	1952
Manitowoc Lincoln	1954
Manitowoc Lincoln	1958
Manitowoc Lincoln	1960
Oshkosh	1961
Manitowoc Lincoln	1963

Boys Track & Field
School	Year	Division
Green Bay West	1934	Class A
Appleton	1937	Class A
Green Bay West	1954	Class A
Manitowoc Lincoln	1967	Class A
Manitowoc Lincoln	1976	Class A
Manitowoc Lincoln	1980	Class A
Notre Dame Academy	2002	Division 2

=== Summer sports ===
Baseball
School	Year
Sheboygan North	1989

== List of conference champions ==
=== Boys Basketball ===
School	Quantity	Years
Manitowoc Lincoln	22	1928, 1929, 1933, 1936, 1955, 1958, 1959, 1961, 1967, 1968, 1971, 1973, 1974, 1979, 1980, 1990, 1997, 1998, 1999, 2000, 2006, 2007
(Appleton) West	18	1924, 1931, 1932, 1933, 1934, 1935, 1945, 1947, 1948, 1950, 1951, 1953, 1957, 1960, 1962, 1964, 1965, 1970
Sheboygan North	16	1943, 1982, 1984, 1985, 1986, 1987, 1989, 1991, 1992, 1993, 1995, 1996, 1998, 2002, 2003, 2004
Oshkosh	10	1928, 1930, 1931, 1937, 1938, 1939, 1940, 1944, 1952, 1955
Green Bay West	9	1932, 1938, 1956, 1960, 1963, 1966, 1967, 1969, 1983
(Sheboygan) Central/South	8	1923, 1940, 1941, 1942, 1949, 1953, 1960, 1981
Green Bay East	7	1925, 1935, 1936, 1946, 1954, 1969, 1996
Green Bay Southwest	6	1972, 1974, 1977, 1978, 1987, 2001
Fond du Lac	5	1926, 1927, 1930, 1974, 1976
Green Bay Preble	5	1975, 1985, 1988, 1991, 1994
Neenah	1	1969
Notre Dame Academy	1	2005
Appleton East	0	
Marinette	0	
Two Rivers	0	

=== Girls Basketball ===
School	Quantity	Years
Green Bay Southwest	8	1980, 1985, 1995, 1996, 1997, 1998, 1999, 2000
Green Bay Preble	7	1979, 1984, 1986, 1987, 1991, 1992, 2002
Sheboygan North	6	1976, 1993, 2004, 2005, 2006, 2007
Manitowoc Lincoln	5	1981, 1982, 1983, 1987, 1994
Notre Dame Academy	4	1994, 1999, 2001, 2003
Fond du Lac	3	1979, 1988, 1989
Green Bay West	3	1976, 1977, 1978
Green Bay East	1	1990
Sheboygan South	0	
Two Rivers	0	

=== Football ===
School	Quantity	Years
Green Bay East	25	1923, 1924, 1925, 1928, 1929, 1931, 1932, 1933, 1935, 1936, 1937, 1938, 1939, 1940, 1941, 1944, 1950, 1965, 1969, 1971, 1972, 1976, 1978, 1979, 1995
Green Bay West	23	1925, 1926, 1927, 1931, 1932, 1939, 1941, 1942, 1945, 1946, 1951, 1952, 1954, 1955, 1958, 1959, 1960, 1961, 1967, 1980, 1981, 1982, 1983
Manitowoc Lincoln	14	1930, 1939, 1948, 1966, 1973, 1984, 1985, 1986, 1987, 1988, 1990, 1991, 1996, 2006
Fond du Lac	10	1943, 1948, 1953, 1969, 1970, 1971, 1973, 1974, 1977, 1979
Green Bay Preble	10	1979, 1980, 1989, 1990, 1992, 1993, 1994, 2001, 2002, 2005
Notre Dame Academy	5	1997, 1998, 2000, 2003, 2006
Oshkosh	5	1949, 1961, 1964, 1965, 1968
(Appleton) West	4	1947, 1956, 1957, 1963
(Sheboygan) Central/South	3	1934, 1962, 2004
Sheboygan North	3	1963, 1993, 1999
Green Bay Southwest	1	1975
Marinette	1	1926
Appleton East	0	
Neenah	0	
Two Rivers	0	
