= Mason Appleton =

American ice hockey player (born 1996)

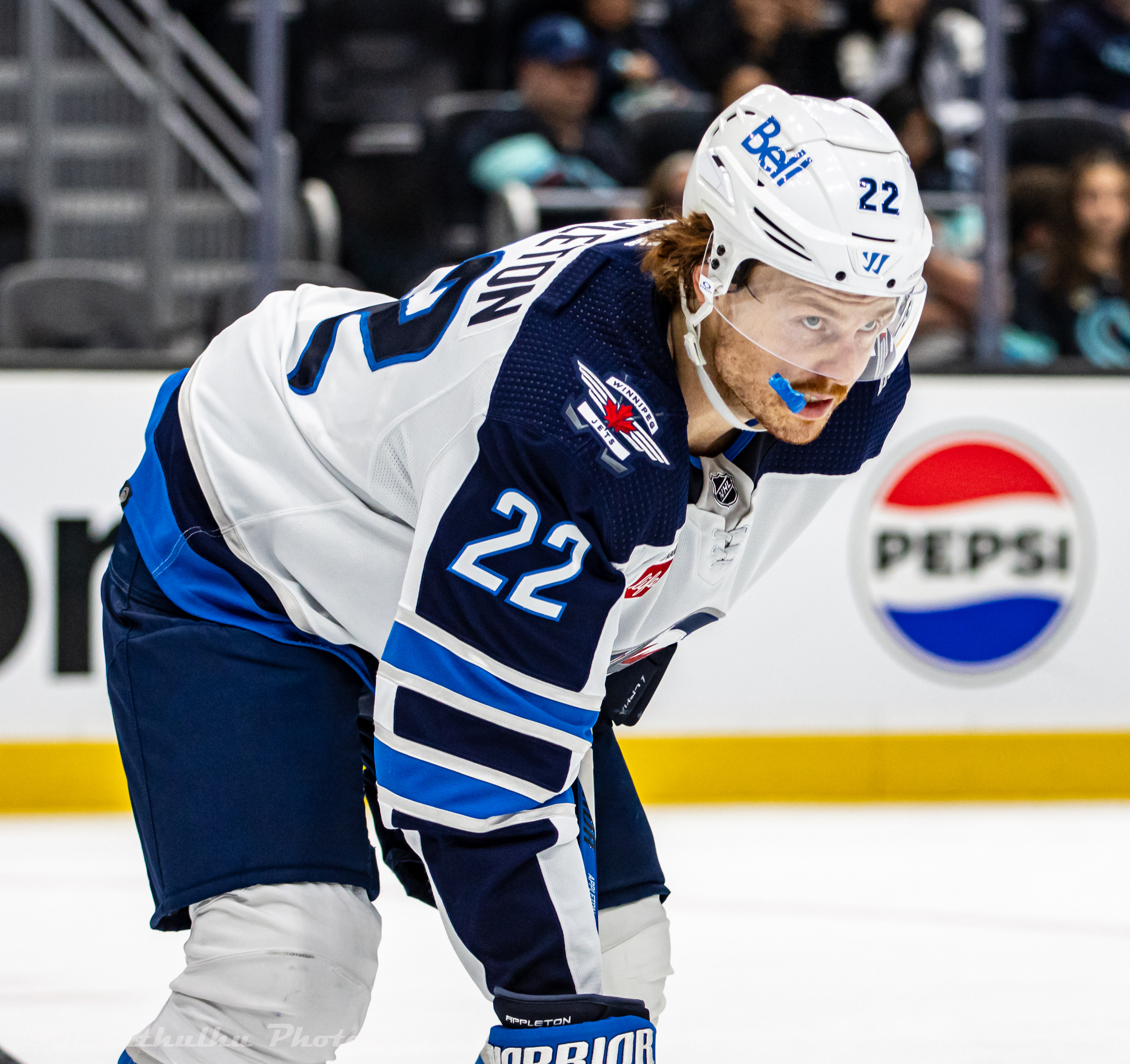
- Appleton with the Winnipeg Jets in 2024
- Born: January 15, 1996 (age 30) Green Bay, Wisconsin, U.S.
- Height: 6 ft 2 in (188 cm)
- Weight: 194 lb (88 kg; 13 st 12 lb)
- Position: Forward
- Shoots: Right
- NHL team Former teams: Detroit Red Wings; Winnipeg Jets; Seattle Kraken
- NHL draft: 168th overall, 2015; Winnipeg Jets
- Playing career: 2017–present

Mason Appleton (born January 15, 1996) is an American professional ice hockey player who is a forward for the Detroit Red Wings of the National Hockey League (NHL).

== Early life ==
Appleton was born on January 15, 1996, in Green Bay, Wisconsin to parents Jim and Kim. He cites his father as the reason he began playing ice hockey. His younger cousin Collin also played ice hockey.

== Playing career ==
Appleton was born and raised in Green Bay, Wisconsin, where he attended Ashwaubenon High School and Notre Dame Academy. During his freshman year at Ashwaubenon, he was the third-leading scorer with 15 goals with 23 assists. Appleton left for Notre Dame Academy (NDA) in 2011 where he played alongside his cousin Collin for the Tritons. During that season, he helped the Tritons win their first state championship after scoring the goal during the second overtime to beat Wausau West The following year, Appleton helped the NDA Tritons dominate Wisconsin high school hockey by winning their first 20 games before tying Green Bay United. During the season, he scored 20 goals and recorded 25 assists in 28 games. As a result of his play, he attended USA Hockey’s Select 17 Camp, recording 1 assist in five games during tournament play.

In his senior year at NDA, Appleton led the Tritons with 70 points, earning Wisconsin Hockey Coaches Association all-state honors and was a finalist for player of the year. In May, Appleton was drafted third overall by the Tri-City Storm of the United States Hockey League (USHL), the highest a member of NDA had ever been drafted. At the time of his selection, he stood at 6-foot-2 and weighed 185-pound. Appleton finished his high school career with 66 goals and 110 assists. He played one season of junior ice hockey with the Tri-City Storm before joining the Michigan State Spartans in 2015. During his time in the USHL, Appleton was the league's sixth-leading scorer and third on the Storm with 28 assists.

=== Collegiate ===
Appleton joined the Michigan State Spartans for their 2015–16 season where he recorded a team-high 17 assists and a total of 22 points in 37 games. He scored his first collegiate goal during a 5–0 win against the New Hampshire Wildcats on November 6, 2015. Following this, he became the first Spartan since 2009 to pick up a point in his first three collegiate contests. Appleton ended his rookie season leading all freshmen with 22 points and earned the teams' Outstanding Rookie Award.

During the summer before his sophomore season, Appleton was drafted in the sixth round, 168th overall by the Winnipeg Jets in the 2015 NHL entry draft. After being drafted, Appleton said, "for me, I kind of don't look at myself as a 6th round pick...I look at myself as the type of hockey player that I am. I'm a confident player, I'm a confident guy. There is still more to prove. There is room to get better. My goal is to play in the NHL and I haven't achieved that yet."

When Appleton returned to the Spartans for his sophomore season, he earned praise from the coach and teammates for his offseason training. He played on a line with Patrick Khodorenko and Taro Hirose, who accounted for 23 points within the teams' first nine games. By late November, Appleton reached his goal total of five and added 11 points to lead the team. At the conclusion of the 2016–17 season, Appleton was named Team MVP and Outstanding Offensive Player after finishing with a career-best 31 points. Following his sophomore season, Appleton was named the 72nd captain in program history alongside assistant captains Carson Gatt, Brennan Sanford, and Sam Saliba.

=== Professional ===
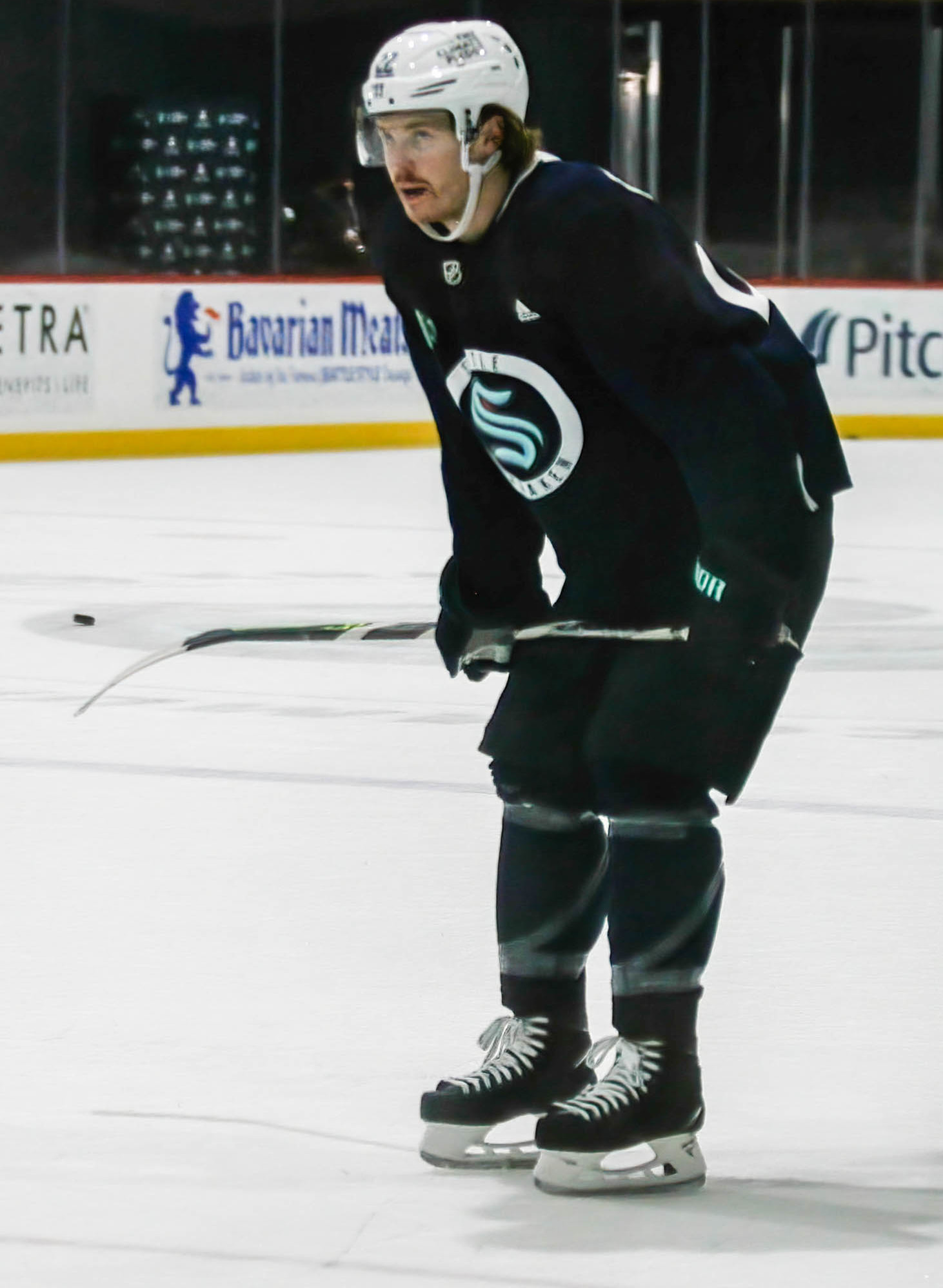
Appleton practicing with the Seattle Kraken in 2022.

After two seasons with the Spartans, Appleton left college to sign a three-year entry level contract with the Jets with an average annual value of $758,333. He attended their training camp prior to the 2017–18 season and was reassigned to their American Hockey League (AHL) affiliate, the Manitoba Moose, for the season. Appleton started the season centering the Moose's fourth line but quickly moved up the depth chart as a left winger on the team’s top line. On October 21, he recorded his first career AHL goal on the power-play as the Moose beat the Iowa Wild 4–2. As a result of his play, Appleton was selected as CCM/AHL Player of the Week for the week of November 20 after recording six points in three games, which also included two game-winning goals. By April 2018, Appleton led the Moose with 61 points in 71 games and set a new franchise records in assists and points by a rookie. He also led all AHL rookies in scoring and placed fourth in the league’s overall points race. He was subsequently named to AHL All-Rookie Team and represented the Moose at the 2018 AHL All-Star Classic. He also won the Dudley "Red" Garrett Memorial Award as AHL Rookie of the Year and was named to the AHL's First All-Star. However, as the Moose qualified for the 2018 Calder Cup playoffs, Appleton suffered a concussion and was forced to sit out for their first round matchup with the Grand Rapids Griffins.

Following his rookie season, Appleton was again invited to participate at the Jets' training camp prior to the 2018–19 season. Appleton made his NHL debut on December 1, 2018 against the New Jersey Devils. He recorded an assist on Andrew Copp's goal in the third period. On December 20, Appleton scored his first NHL goal against Martin Jones in a 5–3 win over the San Jose Sharks.

On July 21, 2021, Appleton was selected from the Jets at the 2021 NHL expansion draft by the Seattle Kraken.

On March 20, 2022, one day before the trade deadline, Appleton was traded back to the Winnipeg Jets in exchange for a 2023 fourth round draft pick.

On July 2, 2025, Appleton signed a two-year, $2.9 million contract with the Detroit Red Wings.

== Career statistics ==
| | | | Regular season | | | | | Playoffs |
| Season | Team | League | GP | G | A | Pts | PIM | GP | G | A | Pts | PIM |
|---|---|---|---|---|---|---|---|---|---|---|---|---|
| 2010–11 | Ashwaubenon High School | FRCC | 23 | 15 | 23 | 38 | 12 | 3 | 2 | 5 | 7 | 0 |
| 2011–12 | Notre Dame Academy | FRCC | 24 | 10 | 32 | 42 | 15 | 6 | 2 | 3 | 5 | 0 |
| 2012–13 | Notre Dame Academy | FRCC | 23 | 15 | 21 | 36 | 19 | 5 | 5 | 4 | 9 | 0 |
| 2013–14 | Notre Dame Academy | FRCC | 23 | 26 | 34 | 60 | 6 | 5 | 4 | 6 | 10 | 14 |
| 2014–15 | Tri–City Storm | USHL | 54 | 12 | 28 | 40 | 84 | 7 | 4 | 4 | 8 | 12 |
| 2015–16 | Michigan State Spartans | B1G | 37 | 5 | 17 | 22 | 32 | — | — | — | — | — |
| 2016–17 | Michigan State Spartans | B1G | 35 | 12 | 19 | 31 | 37 | — | — | — | — | — |
| 2017–18 | Manitoba Moose | AHL | 76 | 22 | 44 | 66 | 57 | 2 | 0 | 1 | 1 | 2 |
| 2018–19 | Manitoba Moose | AHL | 40 | 15 | 17 | 32 | 24 | — | — | — | — | — |
| 2018–19 | Winnipeg Jets | NHL | 36 | 3 | 7 | 10 | 4 | — | — | — | — | — |
| 2019–20 | Winnipeg Jets | NHL | 46 | 5 | 3 | 8 | 20 | 1 | 0 | 0 | 0 | 0 |
| 2019–20 | Manitoba Moose | AHL | 4 | 0 | 1 | 1 | 0 | — | — | — | — | — |
| 2020–21 | Winnipeg Jets | NHL | 56 | 12 | 13 | 25 | 14 | 8 | 1 | 2 | 3 | 2 |
| 2021–22 | Seattle Kraken | NHL | 49 | 6 | 11 | 17 | 14 | — | — | — | — | — |
| 2021–22 | Winnipeg Jets | NHL | 19 | 2 | 2 | 4 | 16 | — | — | — | — | — |
| 2022–23 | Winnipeg Jets | NHL | 41 | 5 | 11 | 16 | 8 | 5 | 0 | 0 | 0 | 0 |
| 2023–24 | Winnipeg Jets | NHL | 82 | 14 | 22 | 36 | 26 | 5 | 0 | 2 | 2 | 6 |
| 2024–25 | Winnipeg Jets | NHL | 71 | 10 | 12 | 22 | 22 | 13 | 0 | 7 | 7 | 14 |
| 2025–26 | Detroit Red Wings | NHL | 65 | 6 | 8 | 14 | 44 | — | — | — | — | — |
| NHL totals | | | 465 | 63 | 89 | 152 | 168 | 32 | 1 | 11 | 12 | 22 |

== Awards and honors ==
| Award | Year | Ref |
AHL
| First All-Star Team | 2018 | |
| All-Rookie Team | 2018 | |
| Rookie of the Year | 2018 | |
