= Buzz Off =

Buzz off may refer to:

- Buzz-Off, a character in Mattel's He-Man and the Masters of the Universe
- Buzz Off, a 2010 book by Hannah Reed
