= Fox Valley Association =

Wisconsin high school athletic conference

- Conference: WIAA
- Founded: 1970
- Sports fielded: 20
- No. of teams: 10 (9 for 2027-28)
- Website: www.fvasports.net

The Fox Valley Association is a high school athletic conference comprising ten high schools located within the Fox Valley region of northeastern Wisconsin. Founded in 1970, the organization and its member schools are affiliated with the Wisconsin Interscholastic Athletic Association.

== History ==
The Fox Valley Association was formed in 1970, resulting from a split within the Fox River Valley Conference. Four schools along the western shore of Lake Winnebago (Appleton East, Appleton West, Neenah and Oshkosh) joined with three schools formerly of the disbanded Mid-Eastern Conference (Kaukauna, Kimberly and Menasha) to form the initial membership roster. Oshkosh North became the eighth member of the conference when it opened its doors in 1972, with the original Oshkosh High School being renamed to Oshkosh West. The FVA briefly grew to nine schools with the addition of Two Rivers in 1977, before they made their exit to join a reconstituted Eastern Wisconsin Conference in 1979. Membership increased back to nine schools in 1989 when Fond du Lac (formerly of the FRVC) became part of the FVA, joining for most sports that year. Their football program joined the conference for the 1993 season. In 1995, Appleton opened a third high school on the city's north side, and Appleton North became the FVA's tenth member that year. The roster has stayed at ten schools ever since, with the only change since Appleton North's addition was the affiliation swap between Menasha and Bay Conference members Hortonville in 2014. In November 2025, Appleton West filed a formal request with the WIAA to move to the Bay Conference in time for the 2027-28 school year, where it is hoped that they would be more competitive. The move is supported by the remaining FVA schools but is opposed by the nine current Bay Conference members. The process will go through the WIAA Conference Realignment Task Force Committee starting in December 2025, with their request formally approved by the Board of Controls in March 2026.

=== Football ===
The Fox Valley Conference initially sponsored football from their inaugural season in 1970 to the 2010 season. In 2011, the WIAA merged the FVA with the Wisconsin Valley Conference, who was seeking assistance with scheduling conference games, into the football-only Valley Football Association. This arrangement lasted until the 2020-2021 season, when the WIAA joined forces with the Wisconsin Football Coaches Association to organize a sweeping realignment of Wisconsin high school football. These plans were put on hold due to the COVID-19 pandemic, when several conferences in the Fox Valley decided not to play football during the fall season. The 20-team Fox Valley Classic Conference was formed as a football league for the alternate spring 2021 season and included all FVA members, along with schools from the Fox River Classic and Wisconsin Valley Conferences. The 2021 season saw the return of football sponsorship for the FVA, and all conference members participated with the exception of Appleton West and Hortonville, who were moved to the VFA. Hortonville and Oshkosh North swapped affiliations for the 2024-2025 competition cycle, and that alignment will remain in place at least through the 2027 football season.

== List of member schools ==
=== Current full members ===
School	Location	Affiliation	Enrollment	Mascot	Colors	Joined
Appleton East	Appleton, WI	Public	1,501	Patriots		1970
Appleton North	Appleton, WI	Public	1,854	Lightning		1995
Appleton West (Note: Joining the Bay Conference for the 2027-28 school year)	Appleton, WI	Public	1,405	Terrors		1970
Fond du Lac	Fond du Lac, WI	Public	1,880	Cardinals		1989
Hortonville	Hortonville, WI	Public	1,385	Polar Bears		2014
Kaukauna	Kaukauna, WI	Public	1,206	Galloping Ghosts		1970
Kimberly	Kimberly, WI	Public	1,571	Papermakers		1970
Neenah	Neenah, WI	Public	2,022	Rockets		1970
Oshkosh North	Oshkosh, WI	Public	1,235	Spartans		1972
Oshkosh West	Oshkosh, WI	Public	1,582	Wildcats		1970

=== Current associate members ===
School	Location	Affiliation	Mascot	Colors	Primary Conference	Sport(s)
Notre Dame Academy	Green Bay, WI	Private (Catholic)	Tritons		Fox River Classic	Boys Volleyball (Note: Co-operative with Ashwaubenon, Bay Port, Green Bay East, N.E.W. Lutheran and Sturgeon Bay)

=== Former members ===
School	Location	Affiliation	Mascot	Colors	Joined	Left	Conference Joined	Current Conference
Menasha	Menasha, WI	Public	Bluejays		1970	2014	Bay	
Two Rivers	Two Rivers, WI	Public	Purple Raiders		1977	1979	Eastern Wisconsin	

== Membership map ==
Fox Valley Association
Location of Fox Valley Association full members:
1 Appleton East
2 Appleton North
3 Appleton West
4 Fond du Lac
5 Hortonville
6 Kaukauna
7 Kimberly
8 Neenah
9 Oshkosh North
10 Oshkosh West

== Sponsored sports ==
	Baseball	Boys Basketball	Girls Basketball	Boys Cross Country	Girls Cross Country	Football	Boys Golf	Girls Golf	Boys Soccer	Girls Soccer	Softball	Boys Swim & Dive	Girls Swim & Dive	Boys Tennis	Girls Tennis	Boys Track & Field	Girls Track & Field	Boys Volleyball	Girls Volleyball	Boys Wrestling	Girls Wrestling
Appleton East	●	●	●	●	●	●	●	●	●	●	●		● (Note: Co-operative with Hortonville and Kaukauna)	●	●	●	●	●	●	●	●
Appleton North	●	●	●	●	●	●	●	●	●	●	●	● (Note: Co-operative with Appleton East)	●	●	●	●	●	●	●	●	●
Appleton West	●	●	●	●	●		●	●	●	●	●	● (Note: Co-operative with Hortonville, Kaukauna and Kimberly)	● (Note: Co-operative with Kimberly)	●	●	●	●	●	●	●	●
Fond du Lac	●	●	●	●	●	●	●	●	●	●	●	●	● (Note: Co-operative with Oakfield)	●	●	●	●	● (Note: Co-operative with North Fond du Lac)	●	●	●
Hortonville	●	●	●	●	●	●	●	●	●	●	●			●	●	●	●	●	●	●	●
Kaukauna	●	●	●	●	●	●	●	●	●	●	●			●	●	●	●	●	●	●	●
Kimberly	●	●	●	●	●	●	●	●	●	●	●			●	●	●	●	●	●	●	●
Neenah	●	●	●	●	●	●	●	●	●	●	●	●	●	●	●	●	●	●	●	●	●
Oshkosh North	●	●	●	●	●		●	●	●	●	●	● (Note: Co-operative with Lourdes Academy and Valley Christian)	●	●	●	●	●	● (Note: Co-operative with Oshkosh West)	●	●	
Oshkosh West	●	●	●	●	●	●	●	●	●	●	●	●	●	●	●	●	●		●	●	● (Note: Co-operative with Oshkosh North)

== List of state champions ==
=== Fall sports ===
Boys Cross Country
School	Year	Division
Appleton East	1972	Large Schools
Neenah	2001	Division 1
Kimberly	2015	Division 1
Neenah	2018	Division 1

Girls Cross Country
School	Year	Division
Neenah	1981	Class A
Neenah	1982	Class A
Neenah	1983	Class A
Kaukauna	2020	Division 1
Neenah	2024	Division 1

Football
School	Year	Division
Appleton West	1992	Division 1
Oshkosh North	2000	Division 1
Kimberly	2007	Division 2
Kimberly	2008	Division 2

Boys Golf
School	Year
Neenah	1977
Oshkosh West	1980
Appleton West	1981
Neenah	1982
Appleton West	1983
Appleton West	1984
Appleton East	1985

Girls Golf
School	Year
Appleton West	1981
Appleton West	1982
Appleton East	1983
Appleton West	1985
Appleton West	1986

Boys Soccer
School	Year	Division
Neenah	1985	Single Division
Neenah	1986	Single Division
Neenah	2007	Division 1
Appleton North	2020-21	Alternate Season

Girls Tennis
School	Year	Division
Neenah	2015	Division 1
Neenah	2021	Division 1

Boys Volleyball
School	Year	Division
Kaukauna	1970	Single Division
Appleton East	1971	Single Division
Kaukauna	1972	Single Division
Kaukauna	1977	Single Division
Kaukauna	1978	Single Division
Kaukauna	1980	Single Division
Kaukauna	1982	Single Division
Appleton North	2014	Single Division
Kaukauna	2015	Single Division
Kimberly	2019	Single Division
Kimberly	2020-21	Alternate Season

Girls Volleyball
School	Year	Division
Neenah	1978	Class A
Appleton East	1986	Class A
Kimberly	1990	Division 2
Kaukauna	2010	Division 1
Neenah	2016	Division 1
Appleton North	2020-21	Alternate Season

=== Winter sports ===
Boys Basketball
School	Year	Division
Neenah	1975	Class A
Neenah	1978	Class A
Kimberly	1994	Division 2
Kimberly	1995	Division 2
Oshkosh West	2006	Division 1
Oshkosh West	2007	Division 1
Kaukauna	2016	Division 2
Oshkosh North	2018	Division 1
Kaukauna	2018	Division 2

Girls Basketball
School	Year	Division
Neenah	1978	Class A
Kimberly	1987	Class A
Kimberly	1989	Class B
Kimberly	1996	Division 2
Kimberly	1998	Division 2
Oshkosh West	2003	Division 1
Oshkosh West	2004	Division 1
Appleton North	2017	Division 1
Appleton North	2018	Division 2
Kimberly	2025	Division 1

Boys Wrestling
School	Year	Division
Fond du Lac	1991	Division 1
Kaukauna	2014	Division 1
Kaukauna	2015	Division 1
Kaukauna	2016	Division 1
Kaukauna	2017	Division 1
Kaukauna	2021	Division 1
Kaukauna	2022	Division 1
Kaukauna	2023	Division 1
Kaukauna	2024	Division 1
Kaukauna	2025	Division 1
Kaukauna	2026	Division 1

=== Spring sports ===
Baseball
School	Year	Division
Neenah	1972	Single Division
Appleton West	1975	Single Division
Appleton West	1976	Single Division
Appleton West	1982	Class A
Appleton West	1988	Class A
Kimberly	1989	Class B
Appleton West	1991	Division 1
Appleton West	1995	Division 1
Appleton East	1996	Division 1
Fond du Lac	2000	Division 1
Kimberly	2001	Division 1
Appleton West	2004	Division 1
Kimberly	2017	Division 1
Kaukauna	2026	Division 1

Boys Golf
School	Year	Division
Appleton North	2000	Division 1

Girls Soccer
School	Year	Division
Neenah	1990	Single Division
Appleton North	2011	Division 1

Softball
School	Year	Division
Kimberly	1980	Class A
Kimberly	1981	Class A
Kimberly	1988	Class B
Kimberly	1989	Class B
Neenah	1990	Division 1
Kimberly	1993	Division 2
Neenah	1995	Division 1
Appleton East	2000	Division 1
Appleton North	2005	Division 1
Kimberly	2007	Division 1
Kaukauna	2010	Division 1
Kimberly	2014	Division 1
Kaukauna	2017	Division 1
Oshkosh North	2019	Division 1
Kaukauna	2021	Division 1
Kaukauna	2022	Division 1
Kaukauna	2023	Division 1

Boys Tennis
School	Year	Division
Neenah	1991	Single Division
Neenah	1992	Single Division
Neenah	1993	Single Division
Neenah	1994	Single Division
Neenah	1995	Division 1

Boys Track & Field
School	Year	Division
Neenah	1971	Class A
Kimberly	2014	Division 1
Kimberly	2017	Division 1
Kimberly	2018	Division 1
Kimberly	2019	Division 1

Girls Track & Field
School	Year	Division
Appleton East	1990	Class A
Kaukauna	2001	Division 1

== List of conference champions ==
=== Boys Basketball ===
School	Quantity	Years
Neenah	15	1971, 1975, 1976, 1977, 1978, 1979, 1981, 1982, 1985, 1987, 1988, 1998, 2014, 2021, 2022
Fond du Lac	10	1991, 1993, 1994, 1995, 1996, 1997, 1998, 2000, 2001, 2023
Kimberly	9	1972, 1973, 1974, 1977, 1995, 2015, 2019, 2020, 2021
Oshkosh North	8	1986, 1991, 1992, 2009, 2013, 2017, 2018, 2024
(Oshkosh) West	8	1977, 1998, 1999, 2001, 2004, 2005, 2006, 2007
Kaukauna	7	1997, 2008, 2010, 2012, 2016, 2025, 2026
Appleton East	4	1983, 1984, 1990, 2011
Appleton West	3	1989, 2002, 2003
Appleton North	1	2026
Menasha	1	1980
Hortonville	0	
Two Rivers	0	

=== Girls Basketball ===
School	Quantity	Years
Kimberly	23	1982, 1983, 1984, 1985, 1986, 1987, 1989, 1990, 1992, 1995, 1996, 1997, 1998, 2004, 2007, 2008, 2011, 2013, 2014, 2019, 2021, 2025, 2026
Neenah	8	1975, 1978, 1979, 1980, 1981, 1983, 2010, 2023
Appleton West	7	1976, 1977, 1980, 1984, 1985, 1986, 2009
Fond du Lac	6	1993, 1994, 2000, 2005, 2006, 2007
Appleton East	5	1974, 1976, 1977, 1999, 2012
Hortonville	5	2015, 2016, 2020,, 2022, 2024
Appleton North	4	2001, 2011, 2017, 2018
Oshkosh West	3	2002, 2003, 2010
Kaukauna	1	1988
Menasha	1	1991
Oshkosh North	0	
Two Rivers	0	

=== Football ===
School	Quantity	Years
Appleton West	13	1973, 1974, 1979, 1980, 1981, 1984, 1986, 1989, 1990, 1991, 1992, 1993, 1997
Neenah	13	1970, 1972, 1976, 1977, 1979, 1983, 1987, 1989, 1999, 2022, 2024, 2025, 2026
Kimberly	9	2006, 2007, 2008, 2010, 2021, 2022, 2023, 2024, 2025
Appleton East	7	1978, 1982, 1985, 1988, 1989, 1994, 1998
Oshkosh North	6	1972, 1983, 1999, 2000, 2002, 2003
Kaukauna	5	1975, 1995, 2023, 2024, 2026
Appleton North	4	1996, 2004, 2009, 2010
Menasha	3	1975, 2005, 2010
Fond du Lac	2	2001, 2002
(Oshkosh) West	2	1971, 1972
Hortonville	0	
Two Rivers	0	
