= Jerry Daanen =

American football player (born 1944)

No. 31
- Position: Wide receiver

Personal information
- Born: December 15, 1944 (age 81); Green Bay, Wisconsin, U.S.
- Died: February 5, 2024 (aged 79)
- Listed height: 6 ft 0 in (1.83 m)
- Listed weight: 190 lb (86 kg)

Career information
- High school: De Pere (De Pere, Wisconsin)
- College: Miami (FL) (1964-1967)
- NFL draft: 1968: 8th round, 205th overall pick

Career history
- St. Louis Cardinals (1968–1970)

Career NFL statistics
- Receptions: 8
- Receiving yards: 78
- Stats at Pro Football Reference

Jerry Daanen (December 15, 1944 - February 5, 2024) was a former player in the National Football League for the St. Louis Cardinals from 1968 to 1970 as a wide receiver. He played at the collegiate level at the University of Miami.

== Biography ==
Daanen was born Jerome Theodore Daanen on December 15, 1944, in Green Bay, Wisconsin. He died on February 5, 2024.
