= Preble High School =

Public secondary school in Green Bay, Wisconsin

Green Bay Preble High School

Location
- 2222 Deckner Avenue; Green Bay, Wisconsin; United States; 44.50044°N 87.96707°W

Information
- Type: Public
- Motto: Where Learning Never Ends
- Established: 1955
- School district: Green Bay Area Public Schools
- Principal: Courtney Kuehn
- Teaching staff: 128.80 (FTE)
- Grades: 9–12
- Enrollment: 2,147 (2023–2024)
- Student to teacher ratio: 16.67
- Colors: Green and gold
- Mascot: Hornet
- Website: preble.gbaps.org

Preble High School is a public high school in Green Bay, Wisconsin, United States. It is part of the Green Bay Area Public School District. The school serves students from Green Bay, Bellevue, and New Franken. The name comes from the former town of Preble, which is now part of northeastern Green Bay, and New Franken, Wisconsin.

== History ==
Preble High School opened in 1955, with a campus of both junior (7th-9th grade) and senior (10th-12th grade) high schools housed in separate buildings. The junior high was phased out with the opening of Edison Junior High (now Edison Middle) School in 1970. In 1986, Green Bay Public Schools changed to a format of middle (6th-8th grade) and high (9th-12th grade) schools.

On August 8, 2014, a fire occurred in a gymnasium at Preble High School, delaying the start of classes. The fire was a result of the spontaneous combustion of rags soaked with gym floor resurfacing product. It was the second largest fire in Green Bay history. The estimated damage was about 7.5 million dollars. A new field house with an indoor track opened in November 2014.

Preble, which was designed for roughly 1700 students, has held as many as 2100, making it the second largest high school in Wisconsin as of 2016. A referendum to create a new school in northeastern Brown County, Wisconsin to alleviate overcrowding was defeated by a 2-to-1 margin on November 6, 2006. With the recent decline in student population across the Green Bay area, enrollment has stabilized at 1700-1800 students.

Demographics of Preble High School students (2018-2019)
1. White (53.6%)
2. Hispanic (30.7%)
3. Asian (6.80%)
4. Black (5.50%)
5. Two or More Races (2.00%)
6. Native American (1.50%)

== Athletics ==
Preble's athletic teams are known as the Hornets, and compete in the Fox River Classic Conference of the Wisconsin Interscholastic Athletic Association. The Hornets have won nine WIAA championships, six of which came from gymnastics. A brand new track and turf field were constructed at the school in the summer of 2023.

State Championships (* denotes a co-op team)
Year	Division/Class	Sport
2014	1	Hockey (girls)*
1991	1	Volleyball (girls)
1984	A	Cross country (boys)
1980	N/A	Gymnastics (boys)
1976	N/A	Gymnastics (boys)
1975	N/A	Gymnastics (boys)
1973	N/A	Gymnastics (boys)
1971	N/A	Gymnastics (girls)
1969	N/A	Gymnastics (boys)

=== Athletic conference affiliation history ===
- Northeastern Wisconsin Conference (1956-1964)
- Fox River Valley Conference (1964-2007)
- Fox River Classic Conference (2007–present)

== Extra-curricular activities ==
=== Music and drama ===
Preble's music and drama program puts on a variety of plays and musicals throughout the year. The school also has two competitive show choirs, the mixed-gender Center Stage and the female Rendezvous. In October 2010, Center Stage was voted in a fan poll run by Parade Magazine as one of the top three favorite show choirs in the country.

=== Sting Cancer ===
In 2004, a faculty member who is a cancer survivor and students at Preble founded Sting Cancer, a club for raising awareness of cancer and offering support to those affected by it. Over a decade later, the club has spread to nearly 30 other schools in northeast Wisconsin.

== Notable alumni ==
- Tony Bennett, former men's college basketball coach
- Bob Kroll, former NFL player for the Green Bay Packers
- Lee Snodgrass, politician
- Kevin Stemke, former NFL player
- Ron Vander Kelen, former NFL player
