= West De Pere High School =

Location
- 665 Grant St. De Pere, Wisconsin 54115; United States; 44.44314°N 88.07925°W

Information
- Type: Public
- Motto: A Vision of Pride and Excellence
- Established: 1960
- School district: School District of West De Pere
- Principal: Russell Gerke
- Staff: 65.41 (FTE)
- Grades: 9-12
- Enrollment: 1,078 (2023–2024)
- Student to teacher ratio: 16.48
- Colors: White, orange, black
- Athletics: Football, basketball, baseball, track, cross country, golf, wrestling, soccer, softball, hockey, tennis, volleyball
- Athletics conference: FRCC
- Mascot: Phantom
- Website: West De Pere High School

West De Pere High School is one of two public high schools in De Pere, Wisconsin, United States. Built in 1960, it serves students in 9th through 12th grade. The school's mascot is the Phantom. The Phantoms compete in the Fox River Classic Conference.

== History ==
In 2018, a referendum passed to add a second-story addition to the high school. The referendum has been somewhat controversial because of the needed increase in taxes to pay for the expansion.

=== Athletic conference affiliation history ===
- Northeastern Wisconsin Conference (1927-1943)
- Mid-Valley Conference (1946-1950)
- Northeastern Wisconsin Conference (1951-1970)
- Bay Conference (1970-2025)
- Fox River Classic Conference (2025–present)

== Demographics ==
WDP is 83 percent white, seven percent Native American, four percent black, three percent Hispanic and one percent Asian. Two percent of students identify as a part of two or more races.

== Achievements ==
- The pom and dance team has won nine state titles since 2001. (2001-Pom, 2002-Pom, 2003-Pom, 2004-Pom, 2007-Pom, 2008-Pom & Kick, 2009-Kick, 2012-Kick)
- The Phantom baseball team won the Division 2 state baseball championship in 2008.
- The Phantom football team won the Division 3 state football championship in 2010 and 2011. Then winning the Division 2 state football championship in 2025.
- The Marching Phantoms won the state marching title in 2002, 2003, and 2004.

== Performing arts ==
West De Pere formerly had a competitive show choir, "The Phantasmics". The school also has an active jazz band program.

== Notable alumni ==
- Jason Berken, baseball player
- Charlie Hill, comedian and actor
- Joseph F. Martin, former justice of the Wisconsin Supreme Court (1935–1946)
- Jerome Van Sistine, former member of the Wisconsin State Assembly
- Paul Wilmet, baseball player
