= Notre Dame Academy (Green Bay, Wisconsin) =

Catholic high school in Green Bay, Wisconsin

Notre Dame de la Baie Academy
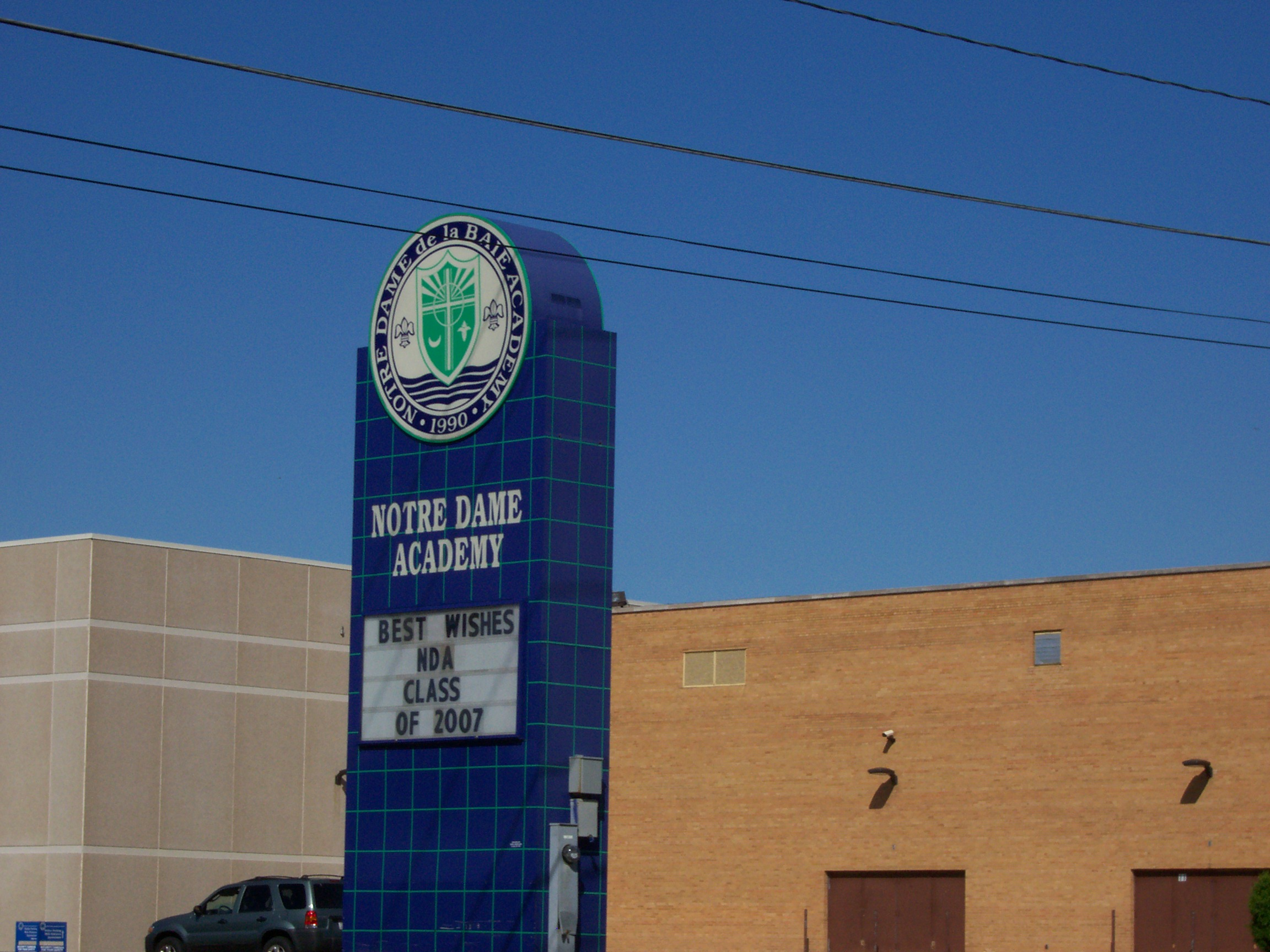

Location
- 610 Maryhill Drive; Green Bay, (Brown County), Wisconsin 54303-2092; United States
- 44°31′13″N 88°3′7″W

Information
- Type: Private
- Religious affiliation: Roman Catholic
- Patron saint: Our Lady of the Bay
- Established: 1990
- President: Amy Ott
- Principal: Andrea Hearden
- Chaplain: Fr. Jordan Neeck, O. Praem
- Faculty: 82
- Grades: 9–12
- Gender: Coeducational
- Classes offered: International Baccalaureate, College Credit, Honors
- Hours in school day: 7
- Colors: Royal blue, green and white
- Fight song: "Notre Dame Victory March"
- Athletics conference: Fox River Classic
- Mascot: Triton
- Team name: Tritons
- Accreditation: AdvancED
- Newspaper: The Tritonian
- Yearbook: The Trident
- Tuition: $8,380 for members of participating parishes $9,380 for members of non-participating parishes $12,680 for international students
- Affiliation: Norbertine Order
- Website: www.notredameacademy.com

Notre Dame de la Baie Academy (known locally as Notre Dame or simply NDA) is a co-educational Roman Catholic high school in Green Bay, Wisconsin. The name is French for "Our Lady of the Bay". Located in the Roman Catholic Diocese of Green Bay, and co-sponsored with the Norbertine Order, Notre Dame has an enrollment of approximately 750 students.

== History ==
Notre Dame Academy was founded in 1990 as a merger between three Catholic high schools in the Green Bay Area at the time: St. Joseph's Academy (an all-girls school located in what is now Aldo Leopold Community School in Green Bay), Abbot Pennings High School (an all-boys school located on the campus of St. Norbert College, in De Pere but since demolished), and Premontre High School (an all-boys school located in what is now Notre Dame Academy). Notre Dame Academy was founded to combine the three smaller schools into one, co-educational Catholic high school for the Green Bay area.

== Extracurriculars ==
Today, NDA houses a number of clubs like Chinese Club, Chess Club, Gamer's Union, ASTRA, STING Cancer, Writer's Union, Investment Club, and Model UN.

== Athletics ==
Notre Dame's athletic teams are known as the Tritons, and compete in the Fox River Classic Conference of the Wisconsin Interscholastic Athletic Association as well as the WACPC. The school has won 43 team state championships, including 34 WIAA team state championships.

=== Athletic conference affiliation history ===
- Fox Valley Christian Conference (1990-1993)
- Fox River Valley Conference (1993-2007)
- Fox River Classic Conference (2007–present)

== Notable alumni ==
- Mason Appleton (2014), professional hockey player
- Eric Genrich (1998), Mayor of Green Bay
- Kevin Harlan (Premontre 1977), sports commentator
- Allie LeClaire (2014), former professional basketball player.
- Max McCormick (2010), professional hockey player
- John Rudzinski (2001), Air Force Academy, All-Mountain West Conference Linebacker
- John Schneider (Abbot Pennings 1989), football executive
- Eliot Wolf (2000), football executive
- Tony Wied (1994), member of the U.S. House of Representatives
