= De Pere High School =

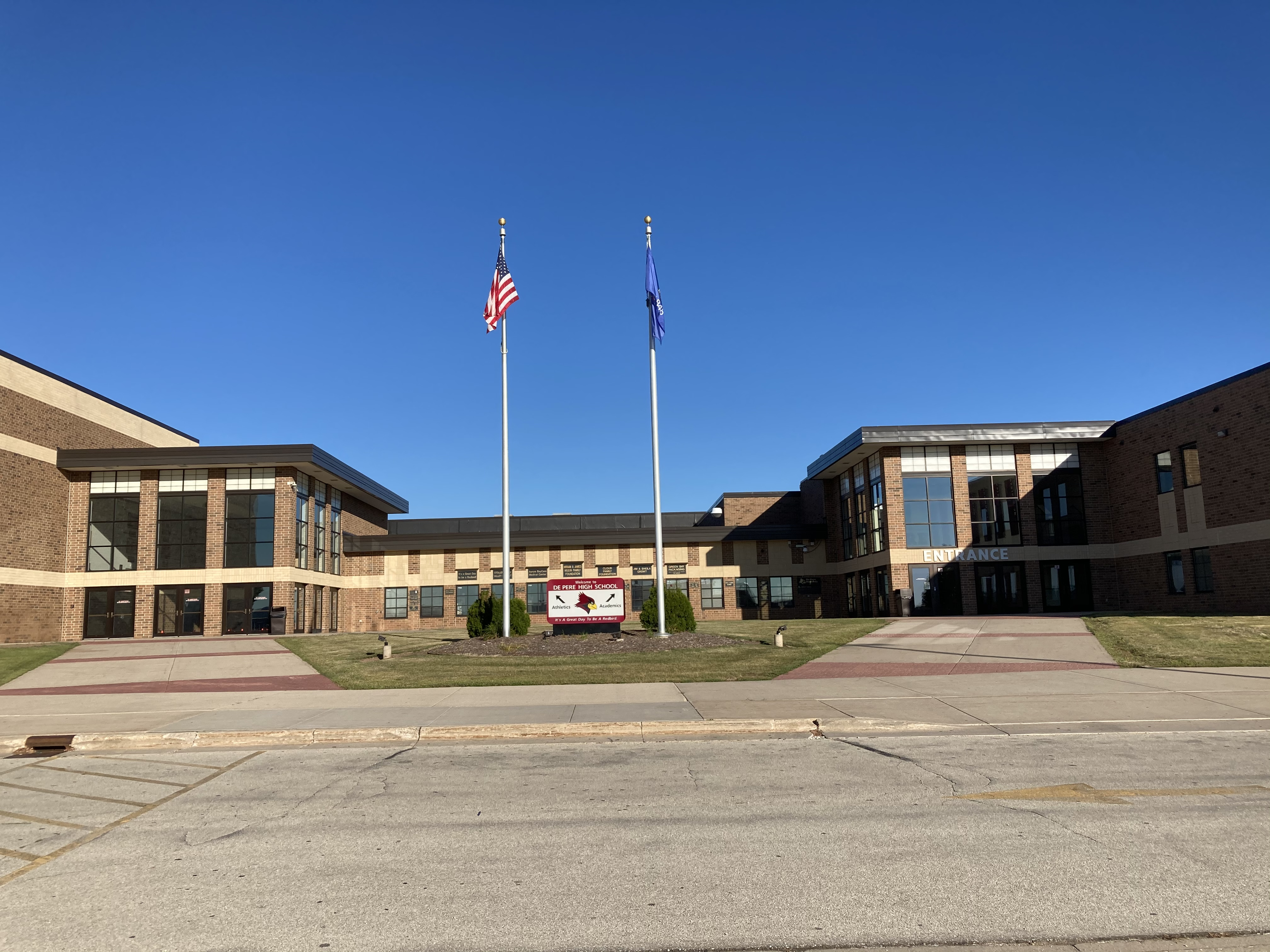
- DPHS in 2020

Location
- 1700 Chicago Street; De Pere, Wisconsin 54115; United States; 44.44052°N 88.04282°W

Information
- Type: Public secondary
- Motto: "It's A Great Day to be a Redbird!"
- Established: 1870; 156 years ago
- Oversight: Unified School District of De Pere
- Principal: Roger Allen
- Teaching staff: 91.02 (FTE)
- Grades: 9–12
- Enrollment: 1,473 (2023-2024)
- Student to teacher ratio: 16.18
- Colors: Cardinal and white
- Athletics conference: Fox River Classic Conference
- Mascot: Rowdy Redbird
- Nickname: Redbirds
- Rival: West De Pere
- Newspaper: Crimson Aviator
- Yearbook: The Fox
- Feeder schools: De Pere Middle School
- Website: De Pere High School

De Pere High School (DPHS) is a public high school located in De Pere, Wisconsin. Founded in 1870, it serves students in grades 9 through 12. It is the only high school in the Unified School District of De Pere.

== History ==
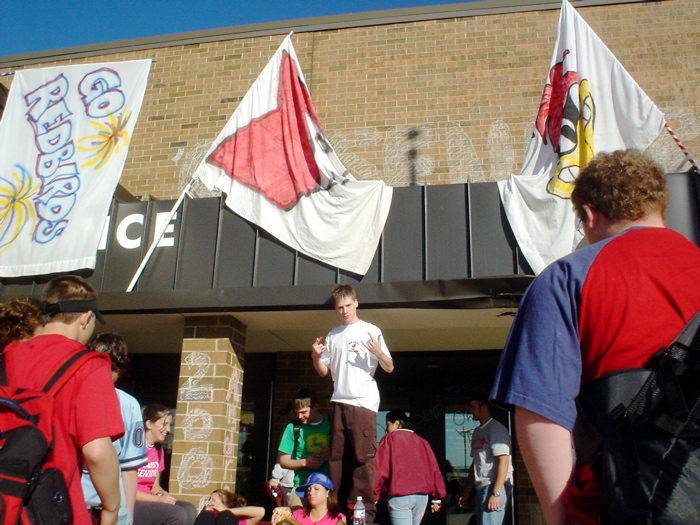
De Pere High School, 2004

Until 1870, schooling for all grades in De Pere, Wisconsin was held in one building; starting in 1870, a high school was located in a stone building on the corner of James Street and Wisconsin Street. During the back half of the 1890s, plans were made for a new high school at the corner of Chicago Street and Broadway. A fire ravaged the stone school on February 20, 1900; it was demolished in 1906 after sitting dormant. After spending the rest of the term at the local German Benevolent Society Hall, the school located at Chicago and Broadway opened in fall 1900. It was quickly nicknamed the "Castle School" or "Castle on the Hill" due to its architecture and topographic situation. In 1978, the current high school was built at 1700 Chicago Street. It underwent major expansion in 2001, with the addition of a gymnasium and several classrooms. In January 2007, more classrooms were added. In 2017, De Pere High School underwent another small expansion. De Pere High School's mascot is the Redbird.

In 2005, the school received a cease-and-desist order on the grounds that its mascot was copyrighted material of Illinois State University. The school eventually redesigned the logo so as to not violate the copyright.

In 2016, Newsweek included DPHS on its list of best high schools for low-income students.

== Demographics ==
The school is 90 percent white, three percent Hispanic, two percent black, two percent Asian, and one percent American Indian.

== Extracurricular activities ==
=== FIRST Robotics ===
De Pere High school is home to FIRST robotics Team 1716. The team, which has been in existence since 2006, offers students the opportunity to gain hands-on knowledge in STEM fields.

During the 2006 season Team 1716 had a win-lose-tie record of 6-7-1. In the 2007–09 seasons, Team 1716 had records of 3-6-0, 1-6-1 and 1-7-0. In the 2010 season, Team 1716 had a 7-4-1 record in Breakaway. The team had a 7-5-1 record in the 2011 season. The 2012 Season (Rebound Rumble) was the best in Team 1716 history, with a record of 6-5-0. They finished as the #4 seed, but were eliminated in the quarterfinals. Team 1716 also received the Judge's Award in 2012 and Creativity award in 2017. In the 2013 and 2014 seasons, Redbird Robotics did not make it to the elimination rounds. In 2014, the team participated in more than one regional for the first time since the team's inception.

=== Athletics ===
De Pere High School is a member of the Fox River Classic Conference, and its athletic teams are nicknamed the Redbirds. Redbird athletic teams had been a member of the Bay Conference. De Pere's last season in the Bay was 2006-2007. The girls swimming team absorbs swimmers from the smaller, crosstown West De Pere High School while still competing under the De Pere Redbirds banner. The school contributes to the ten-school cooperative Bay Area Ice Bears girls hockey team, which plays in the Eastern Shores Conference.

In 2014, the school announced a new synthetic turf football field, a new baseball diamond and soccer field, and upgrades to the existing softball diamond. In late 2019, the school revealed plans for a $3 million renovation of its football stadium, which would add 600 seats to the home grandstand and establish a permanent 500-seat visitors grandstand.

State Championships
Year	Division/Class	Sport 2024 Division 1 Baseball
2023	Division 1	Boys basketball
2023		Girls hockey*
2014		Girls hockey*
2012	Division 1	Girls basketball
2005	Division 1	Girls basketball
1993	Division 2	Boys soccer
1992	Division 3	Football
1990	Class B	Gymnastics
1989	Class B	Gymnastics
1988	Class B	Gymnastics
1987	Class B	Gymnastics
1986	Class B	Gymnastics
1983	Class A	Girls basketball
1934	Class B	Boys basketball
* denotes championship was part of a cooperative team

==== Athletic conference affiliation history ====
- Northeastern Wisconsin Conference (1927-1970)
- Bay Conference (1970-2007)
- Fox River Classic Conference (2007–present)

=== Performing arts ===
The school fields two show choirs, Chicago Street Singers and Jam Session. In 2020, the school hosted a show choir competition, "Destination De Pere: Let's Jam!", and while event organizers claimed it was the first one hosted at De Pere, the school hosted a competition named "Big Jam" from 1996 to 1999. The school also offers a musical and plays through its Drama Club.

== Notable alumni ==
- Deb Baker, mystery author
- Elyse Bennett, professional soccer player
- Jerry Daanen, professional football player
- Terry Meeuwsen, 1973 Miss America
- Drew Nowak, professional football player
- Brevin Pritzl, professional basketball player
