= Sheboygan North High School =

Public secondary school in Sheboygan, Wisconsin, United States

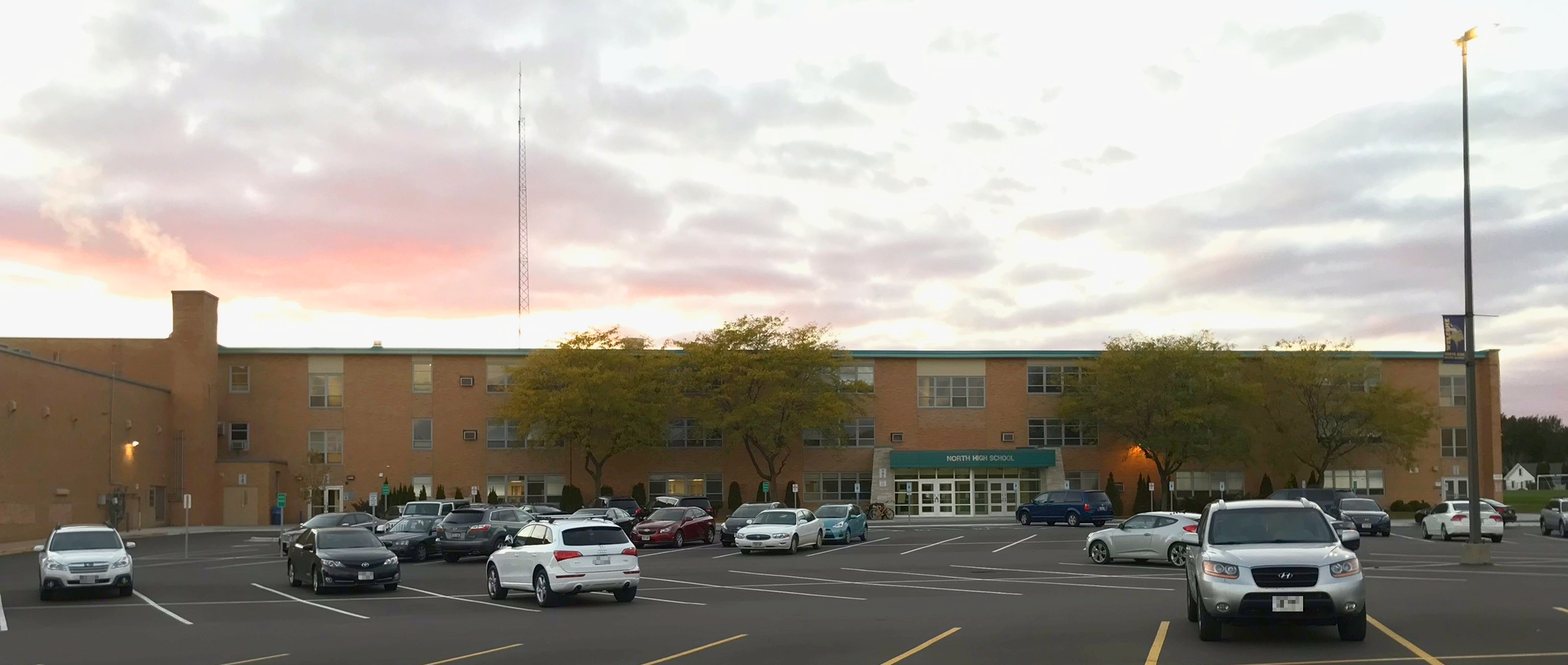

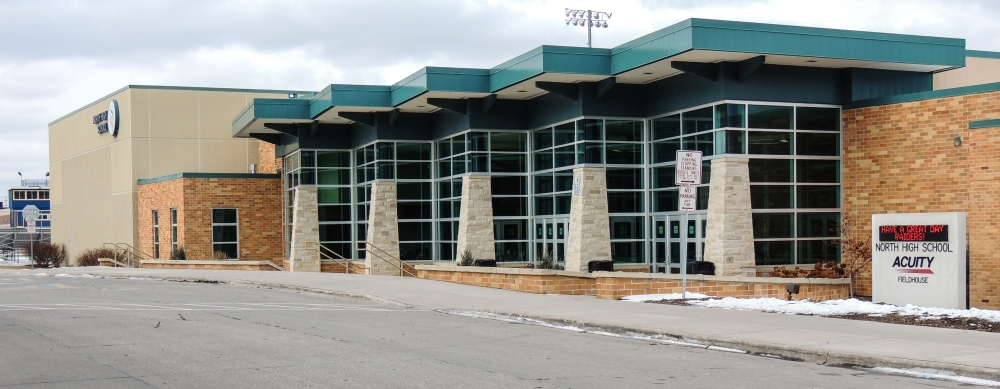

Location
- 2926 North 10th Street; Sheboygan, Wisconsin; United States; 43.77648°N 87.71892°W

Information
- School type: Public High School
- Motto: Knowledge is power
- Established: 1938
- School district: Sheboygan Area School District
- Principal: John Matczak
- Staff: 92.39 (FTE)
- Grades: 9 through 12
- Enrollment: 1,500 (2023-2024)
- Student to teacher ratio: 16.24
- Colors: Blue and gold
- Athletics conference: Fox River Classic Conference
- Rivals: Sheboygan South High School
- Newspaper: North Star
- Yearbook: Polaris
- Website: sheboygan.k12.wi.us

Sheboygan North High School is a public high school in Sheboygan, Wisconsin, operated by the Sheboygan Area School District. The school opened in 1938 in what is now Urban Middle School on the city's north side, with the current building opening just northeast of Urban in 1961; the 1938 facility had been designed originally as a north side junior high school as a complement to the South Side Junior High School (the current-day Farnsworth Middle School), but during building was converted to a senior high school in the midst of Sheboygan's population at the time growing to the north.

The building has undergone many expansions, with the newest being an 'Advanced Technology Center' sponsored by many large area businesses, which is tied into Manufacturing and Technology Education. This addition was welcomed in 2016. The last most major addition was in 2006, when a cafeteria, commons area, expanded facilities for indoor athletics, and currently unutilized space for future use were added. The weight room is the second largest publicly funded weight room in the state, after that of the University of Wisconsin–Madison. In February 2018, the school moved their offices and main entrance to the North 10th Street side of the building (closer to the building's main parking lot) for school security and building flow concerns, mirroring a move done by Sheboygan South the year before. The former address of 1042 School Avenue was also abandoned for a new North 10th Street address.

The North High team is the Golden Raiders, represented by a Viking mascot resembling the Minnesota Vikings logo with differing coloring, with the school colors being royal blue and gold. The school newspaper is North Star, and the yearbook the Polaris. The school's rival is Sheboygan South High School.

== Athletics ==
The school participated in the Fox River Valley Conference from the school's opening in 1938 until the 2007–08 school year, when the WIAA realigned the state's athletic conferences, placing North in the Fox River Classic Conference.

North High teams include cheer and stunt, gymnastics, basketball, soccer, track, volleyball, tennis, golf, baseball, softball, football, cross county, trap, swimming, hockey, and wrestling.

The boys basketball team won the 1986 Wisconsin Interscholastic Athletic Association class A state basketball title.

=== Athletic conference affiliation history ===
- Fox River Valley Conference (1939-2007)
- Fox River Classic Conference (2007–present)

== Notable alumni ==
- James Baumgart, former Wisconsin state senator
- Bill Dwyre, former Milwaukee and Los Angeles sports journalist
- Kayla Karius, former professional basketball player and current college coach
- Pat Matzdorf, former world record holder in the high jump
- Calvin Potter, former Wisconsin state senator
- William Te Winkle, former Wisconsin state senator
- Michelle Tuzee, former lead co-anchor for KABC-TV in Los Angeles
- Terry Van Akkeren, former mayor of Sheboygan and former Wisconsin state representative

== See also ==
- Sheboygan Area School District
- WSHS-FM
- List of high schools in Wisconsin
