= Sheboygan South High School =

Public secondary school in Sheboygan, Wisconsin, United States

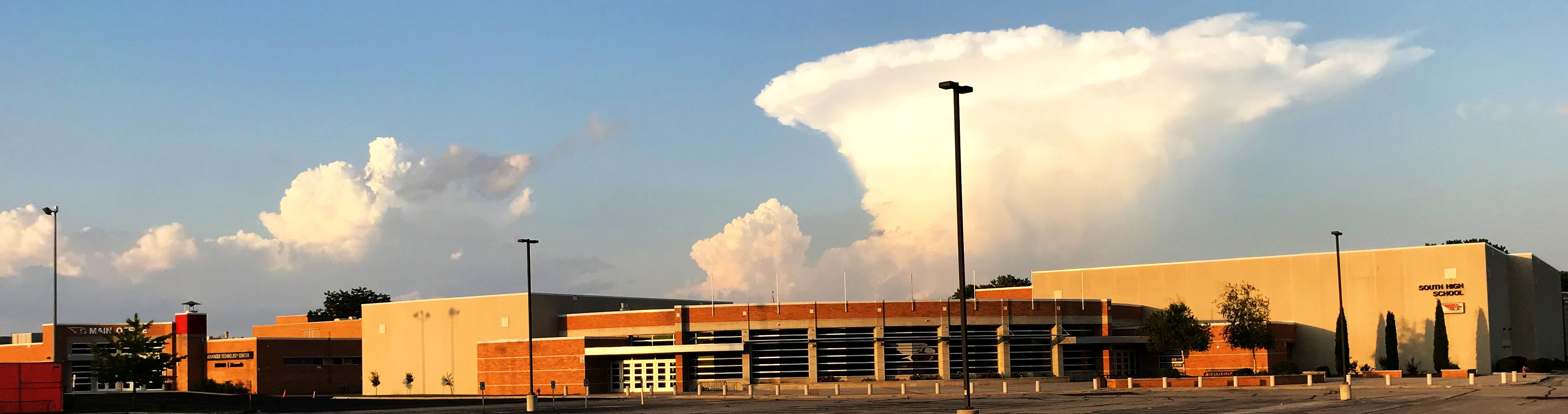
- The school's main, commons, and gymnasium entrances as of July 2019.

Location
- 1240 Washington Avenue; Sheboygan, Wisconsin 53081-6700; United States; 43.72121°N 87.7208°W

Information
- School type: Public High School
- Established: 1960
- School district: Sheboygan Area School District
- Principal: Kevin Formolo
- Teaching staff: 71.33 (FTE)
- Grades: 9 through 12
- Enrollment: 1,123 (2023-2024)
- Student to teacher ratio: 15.74
- Colors: Scarlet and white
- Athletics conference: Glacier Trails Conference; Fox River Classic Conference (football)
- Nickname: Redwing
- Rivals: Sheboygan North High School
- Newspaper: Lake Breeze
- Yearbook: Lake Breeze
- Website: www.sheboygan.k12.wi.us

Sheboygan South High School is a public high school serving approximately 1,335 students in grades 9-12. Located on the south side of Sheboygan, Wisconsin, it is part of the Sheboygan Area School District. The school has a rivalry with the cross-town Sheboygan North High School.

== History ==
The school opened in 1960 in the midst of a population shift toward the south side of Sheboygan and the Town of Wilson. It was a replacement for the former Sheboygan Central High School (established in 1884 as Sheboygan High School, renamed to Central High School in 1938), located in the city's downtown, which is now the site of several charter and alternative programs. The original mascot (Redmen) and newspaper/yearbook names (Lake Breeze) carried over from Central.

The school has undergone three major expansions. In 1998, a new library, commons/cafeteria space and classrooms were added, and a more significant expansion occurred in 2005–2006, with the addition of more classrooms, a new indoor athletic complex, and new tennis courts. Naming rights for the school's new gymnasium were acquired by Acuity Insurance, with the weight room/fitness center being sponsored by Aurora Health Care and open to use by the public outside of school hours. The most recent expansion in 2016 was privately financed and sponsored by several local companies, including Kohler and Sargento, which saw a new administrative office area constructed by the commons on the south site of the building, and a new metal/auto shop. In June 2017, after the office moved to the new area, the school's address was officially changed to 1240 Washington Avenue, ending 57 years of holding the 3128 South 12th Street address.

In the recent past, the Acuity Gymnasium played host to a private Fifth Harmony concert on March 19, 2014 sponsored by Milwaukee radio station WXSS and won by South High students in a school spirit contest involving clothing donations to Goodwill Industries. It also played host to a Bernie Sanders rally for his 2016 presidential campaign on April 1 of that year.

The school's athletic teams are nicknamed the Redwings, with the school colors being red, white and black. Until 1993 the nickname was the Redmen, carried over from Central. When concerns over the racial implications of the Native American name were broached, a long debate among students, faculty, alumni and the community at large resulted in a change, one of the first in the state of Wisconsin to be settled long before the May 2010 implementation of a state law allowing easier challenges of Native American nicknames (later repealed in 2013), and one of the first computer-designed high school logos in the pre-Internet age of desktop publishing. One remnant of the former Redmen name still exists in a mosaic profile of an Indian chief on the front facade of the school's auditorium.

== Athletics ==
Sheboygan South's teams are nicknamed the Redwings, having changed from the Redmen in 1993. They joined the Glacier Trails Conference in 2025 after having been a member of the Fox River Classic Conference, though its football teams remain in the FRCC to maintain the school's natural rivalries.

=== Athletic conference affiliation history ===
- Fox River Valley Conference (1923–2007)
- Fox River Classic Conference (2007–2025; remains football-only member)
- Glacier Trails Conference (2025–present)

== Notable alumni ==
- Bill Schroeder, professional football player
- Roy Pirrung, ultramarathoner

== Images ==
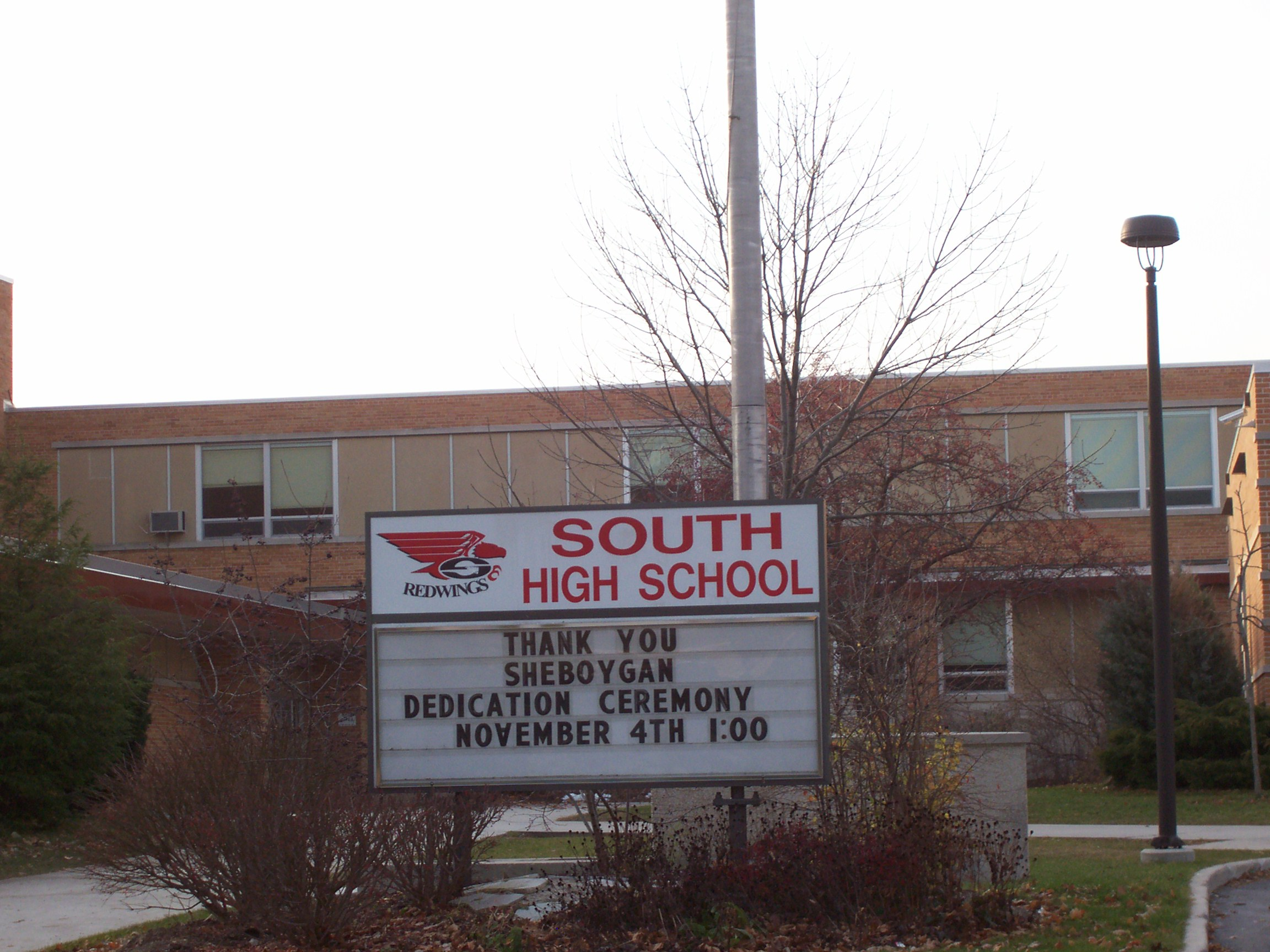
Welcome sign

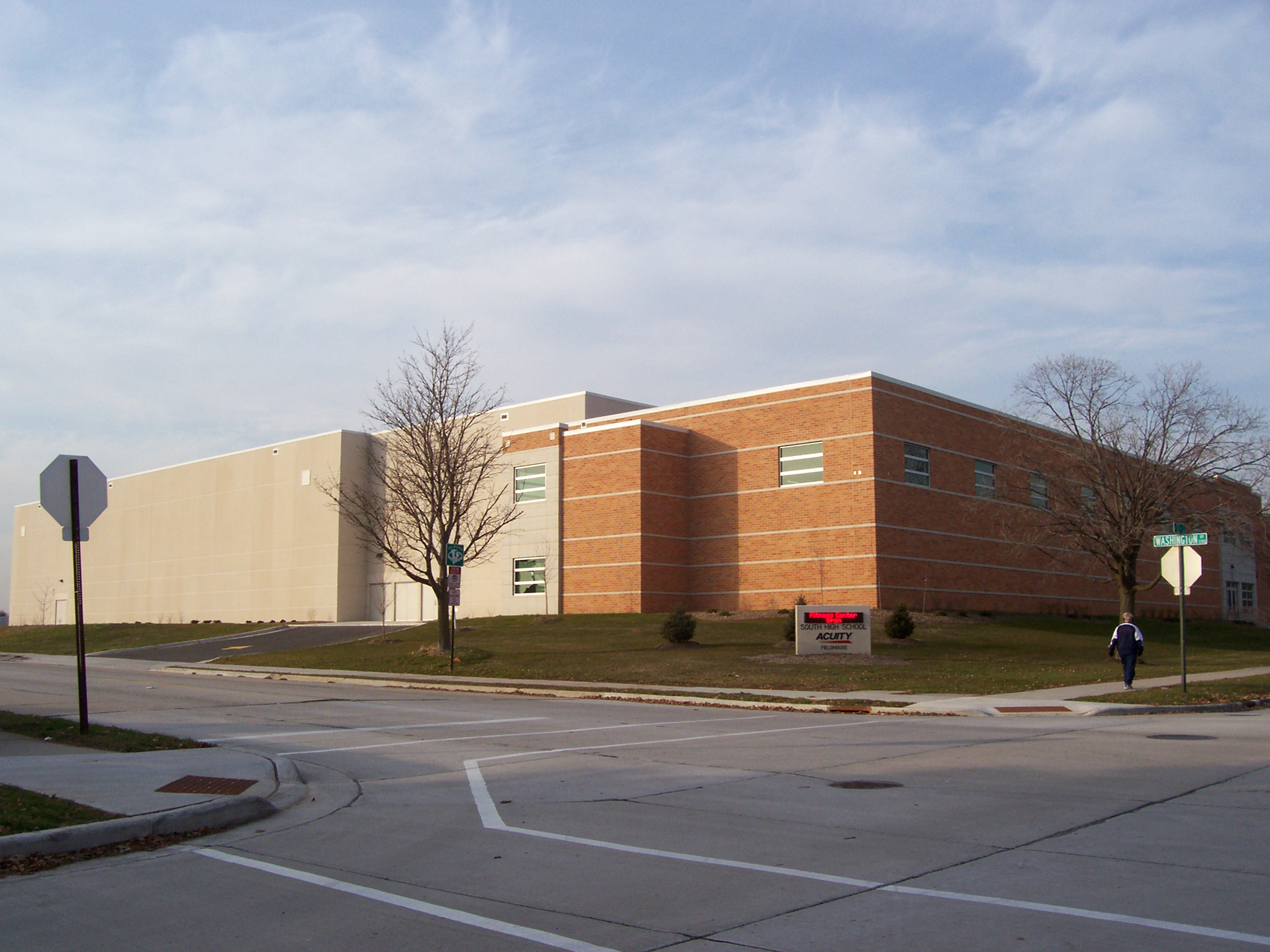
2005 gymnasium addition

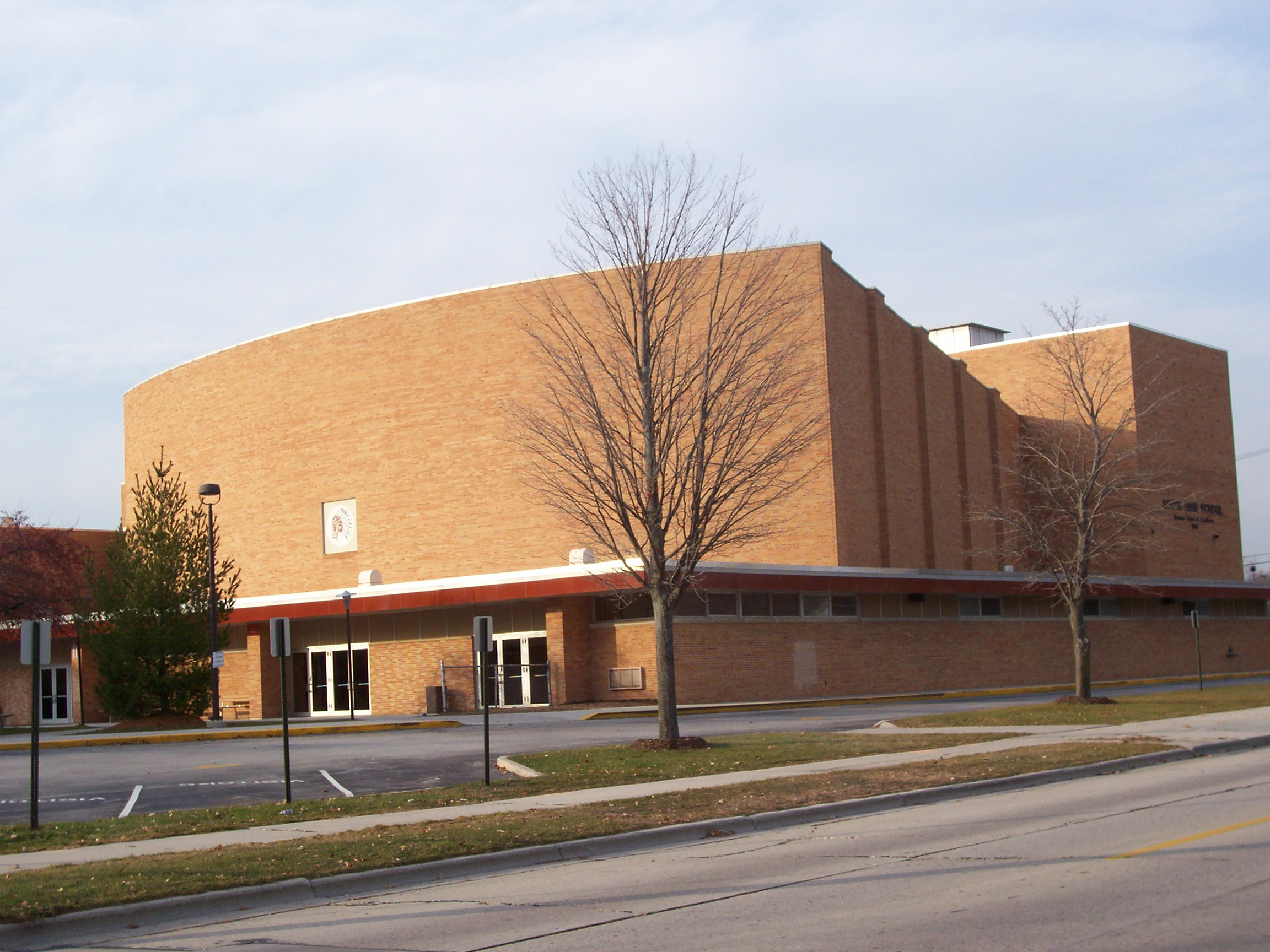
Original auditorium

== See also ==
- WSHS-FM
- List of high schools in Wisconsin
