= Green Bay Southwest High School =

Public secondary school in Green Bay, Wisconsin

Location
- 1331 Packerland Drive; Green Bay, Brown County, Wisconsin 54304; United States; 44.51965°N 88.098174°W

Information
- School type: Public High school
- Motto: Through Strength and Courage Together We Will...
- School district: Green Bay Area Public Schools
- Principal: Michael Whisler
- Teaching staff: 63.88 (FTE)
- Grades: 9–12
- Student to teacher ratio: 16.73
- Hours in school day: Eight (8)
- Colors: Royal blue and silver
- Slogan: Through Strength and Courage Together We Will...
- Song: Our Director
- Fight song: Our Director
- Athletics conference: Fox River Classic Conference
- Mascot: Fighting Trojan
- Team name: Fighting Trojans
- Newspaper: The Shield
- Yearbook: The Classic
- Feeder schools: Lombardi Middle School
- Website: https://southwest.gbaps.org/

Green Bay Southwest High School is one of four public high schools located in Green Bay, Wisconsin. Southwest High School is located at 1331 Packerland Drive. Its school colors are royal blue and silver, and their logo and mascot is the Trojan.

== Academics ==
Nearly half of Southwest's class of 2011 attended accredited four-year colleges (49%). The school offered 14 Advanced Placement courses in 2007, with 220 AP tests taken in May 2007. Overall, 31% of students participated in AP Exams in 2016. Southwest has partnered with NWTC to provide a number of Technical classes at the High School. Southwest High School was ranked #13 in Wisconsin as the best overall school by Newsweek 2013. The school made the Top 20 four years running. A collaboration with NWTC in 2012 to provide credited courses in STEM (Science, Technology, Engineering, Mathematics) provides students hands on coursework in blueprint reading; welding, and robotics. The music department is a magnet for students from neighboring schools and school districts.

== Demographics ==
The school is 66% white, 9% Hispanic, 8% Native American, 6% black, 6% unknown, and 5% of students identify as a part of two or more races.

== Athletics ==
Southwest's athletic teams are known as the Fighting Trojans, and compete in the Fox River Classic Conference. The Trojans have won two Wisconsin Interscholastic Athletic Association state championships, one as part of a co-op girls' hockey team in 2014, and the Division 1 girls' tennis championship in 1997.

The football stadium and track and field area is named Dahlin Family Stadium. It was renovated in 2014 to add synthetic turf. Carl Sunby Gymnasium, named after a former athletic director, has a capacity of 2000 and is often used as a neutral site for WIAA basketball playoff sectionals. Additionally, Southwest has tennis courts, baseball diamonds, and an indoor swimming pool.

=== Athletic conference affiliation history ===
- Fox River Valley Conference (1964-2007)
- Fox River Classic Conference (2007–present)

== Notable alumni ==
- John Anderson (1983), ESPN reporter
- Lou Goss, NASCAR driver.
- Natisha Hiedeman (2015), basketball player for the Israeli team Maccabi Bnot Ashdod and the Connecticut Sun of the Women's National Basketball Association (WNBA)
- Andre Jacque (1999), member of the Wisconsin State Assembly
- Kahlil McKenzie (attended 2011-2013), NFL and XFL defensive lineman
- Max Scharping (2014), NFL offensive lineman
- Bobby Slowik, Houston Texans offensive coordinator

== Health care reform meetings ==
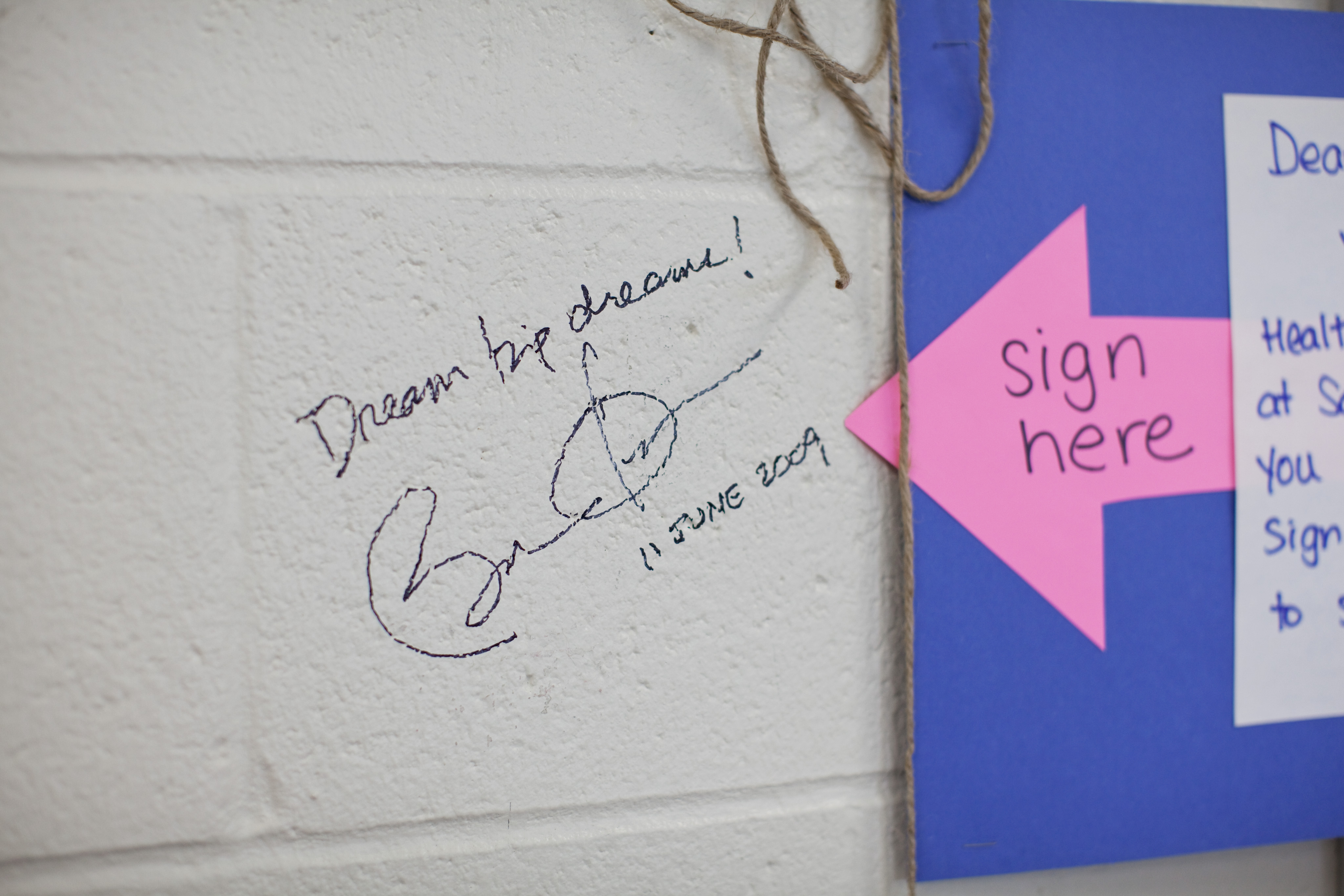
President Obama's signature in a classroom at the school

Southwest High School was the site of a visit by former U.S. president Barack Obama on June 11, 2009, who led a town hall meeting about health care reform. At the request of members of the physical education and health staff at the school, he signed a wall in a health classroom.
