= Deb Baker =

American mystery writer (born 1953)

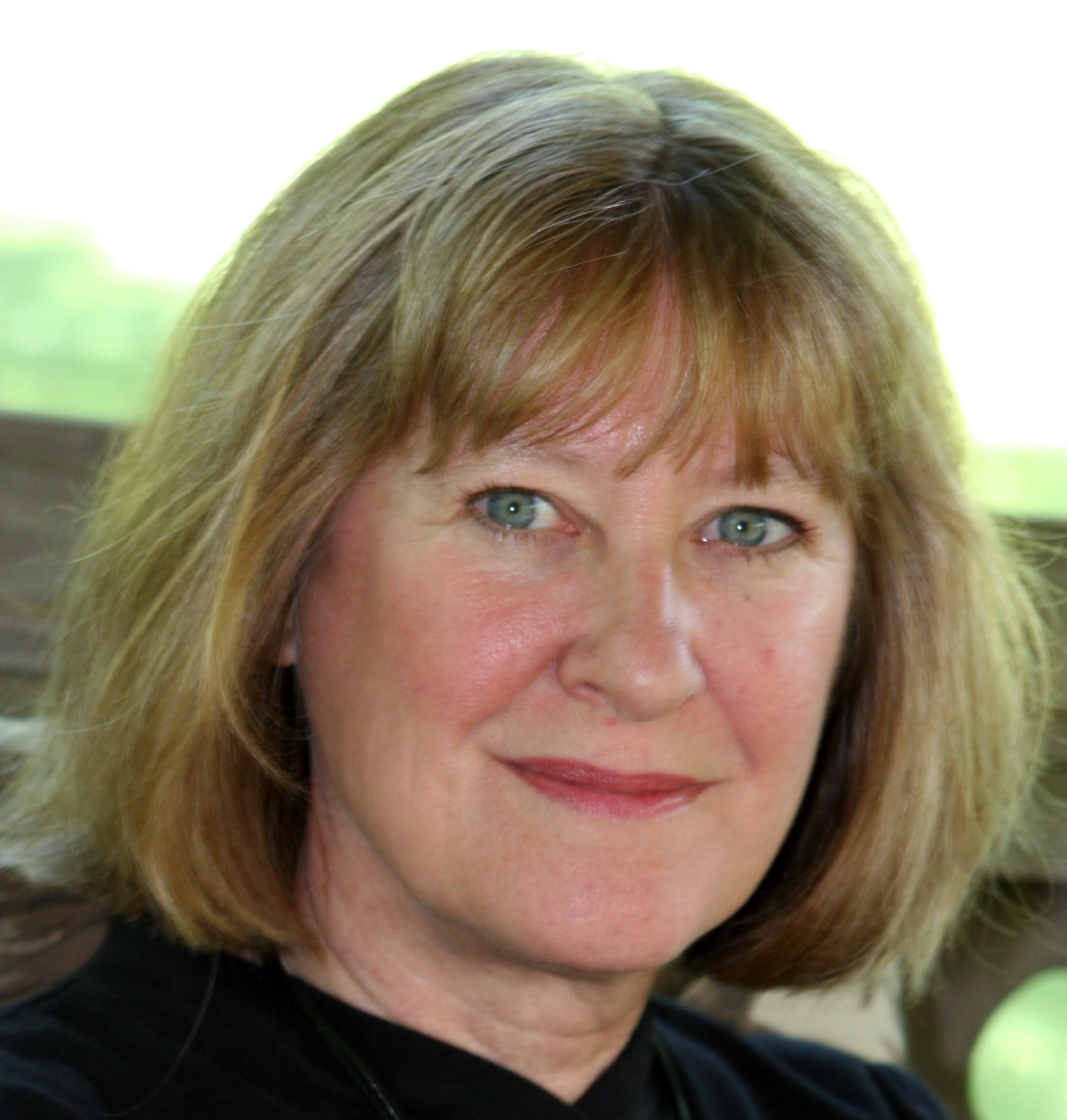
- Born: 1953 (age 72–73); Escanaba, Michigan, U.S.
- Education: De Pere High School; University of Wisconsin
- Writing career
- Pen name: Hannah Reed
- Genre: Mystery

Deb Baker (born 1953) is an American mystery writer from the Upper Peninsula of Michigan, who has created three mystery series.

== Biography ==
Baker was born in Escanaba, Michigan. She lived in the Upper Peninsula until she was 10. Baker lived in Gladstone, Michigan before moving to De Pere, Wisconsin where she graduated from De Pere High School. She earned a degree in English with emphasis on creative writing from the University of Wisconsin and began her writing career. She currently resides in North Lake, Wisconsin.

Baker writes American mystery fiction, especially in the cozy subgenre. She has written two series under her own name. The Dolls To Die For series features a Phoenix, Arizona doll collecting club and member, Gretchen Birch, who solves murders with her new-age Aunt Nina while sharing a doll restoration business with her mother. Baker is an "avid doll collector herself." Baker also wrote the humorous Yooper mysteries centering on a fictitious town in the Michigan Upper Peninsula where Gertie Johnson, mother of the local sheriff, solves murders the old-fashioned way with friends Cora Mae and Kitty. The Yooper series was called a "quirky, very appealing series" by Booklist. Using the pen name Hannah Reed, she writes the Queen Bee mystery series about Story Fischer, a Wisconsin beekeeper.

Baker’s first novel, Murder Passes the Buck (2006), was based on her personal experience in the Michigan Upper Peninsula. The colorful characters she created won her the Authorlink International First Novelist Award in the mystery category, then went on to win Best of Show.

== Bibliography ==
=== As Deb Baker ===
==== Gertie Johnson ====
1. Murder Passes the Buck
2. Murder Grins and Bears It (2007). Llewellyn/Midnight Ink. ISBN 9780738709840
3. Murder Talks Turkey (2008). Llewellyn/Midnight Ink, ISBN 9780738712253
4. Murder Bites the Bullet
5. Cooking Can Be Murder
6. Gertie Johnson Boxed Set

==== Gretchen Birch Murder Mysteries ====
1. Dolled Up for Murder
2. Goodbye Dolly
3. Dolly Departed
4. Guise and Dolls (originally published as Ding Dong Dead)
5. Gretchen Birch Boxed Set

=== As Hannah Reed ===
==== Queen Bee Mysteries ====
1. Buzz Off (2010)
2. Mind Your Own Beeswax (2011)
3. Plan Bee (2012)
4. Beeline to Trouble (2012)
5. Beewitched (2013)
