= Preble, Wisconsin =

Coordinates: 44.4974928°N 87.9698246°W

Preble was a town in Brown County, Wisconsin, United States from 1859 to 1964. It ceased to exist as a jurisdiction in 1964, when by referendum it consolidated with the city of Green Bay.

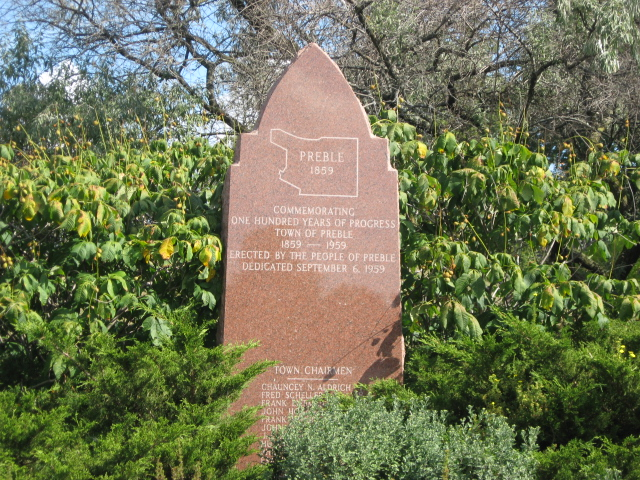
Monolith erected in 1959 to honor Preble's centennial

== Etymology ==
The town's name may originate from Commodore Edward Preble, who served in the Tripolitan War of 1803. It is also possible that Peter Faenger, who migrated from Preble, Germany, named the town, or that Chauncey N. Aldrich named it after his birthplace of Preble, New York.

== History ==
Peter Faenger and a group of German settlers first occupied the area in 1836. One of the first buildings erected by the early settlers was a church served by a priest from Green Bay. According to the few extant memoirs from the time, "the farm houses were made of hewn logs, chinked with mud, roofed with hand split shingles, floored with rough planks, and gathered in small groups, along the highway." In 1859, a petition "good and sufficient" was presented to the Brown County Board asking that a town be set off from the town of Green Bay, and that the town be called the Town of Preble. Thus, on the morning of July 13, 1859, the County Board ordered that the new town be established.

The 1860 census indicates a population of 520 people in the town. 40% of the 113 families were of German descent; however, Preble also had immigrant Irish, Canadians, Hollanders, and Belgians.

The first town elections occurred in 1859 at the house of Ed Rothe. Chauncey N. Aldrich was elected town chairman, a position he held for 26 years. On November 21, 1861, a post office was established, with Ed Rothe appointed postmaster. Because of the costs of the Civil War, the post office discontinued operations on August 1, 1864. The Preble School District was organized in 1866 with the building of Finger School. Town meetings were held in various homes until a town hall was built in 1895.

Farming and dairy were the first occupations of the town, with industry coming later.

=== Consolidation with Green Bay ===
In the 1920s, the town began to experience problems resulting from increasing urbanization. It had to deal with sewage disposal, water quality, and schools for the growing number of children in the area. There was also friction with the neighboring City of Green Bay. Although many citizens felt a change in government was necessary, heated debate arose about what steps to take. The town had three possibilities: remain as a town and be annexed piece-by-piece by the City of Green Bay, incorporate as a village or city that would give Preble definite boundaries, or consolidate with the city. While few supported remaining as a town, two large groups formed in support of the other two options. One group argued that Preble was a logical part of the city and could benefit overall by consolidating with Green Bay, while the other group saw Preble as a self-sufficient community that could thrive on its own. Preble tried to incorporate as a city in the 1950s, but the Wisconsin Circuit Court and the State Planning Commission barred the town from doing so. Ultimately, on November 3, 1964, the consolidation with Green Bay was approved by referendum.

At the time of consolidation, Preble's boundaries extended east of the East River, west of the towns of Humboldt and Eaton, north of Bellevue, and south of the town of Scott. Its population was 12,000, making it one of the largest towns in Wisconsin. The consolidation of 12,576 acres (50.89 km^{2}) nearly doubled the City of Green Bay, allowing for the easterly development of the city.

=== Centennial celebration ===
The Town of Preble held its centennial celebration at Preble Park in September 1959. The two-day event included a community picnic, dance contests, and a parade that started at Danz School and ended at Preble Park. A large granite monument was erected to celebrate 100 years of growth.

== Education ==
Green Bay Preble High School is a legacy of the former town.
