= Kimberly High School (Wisconsin) =

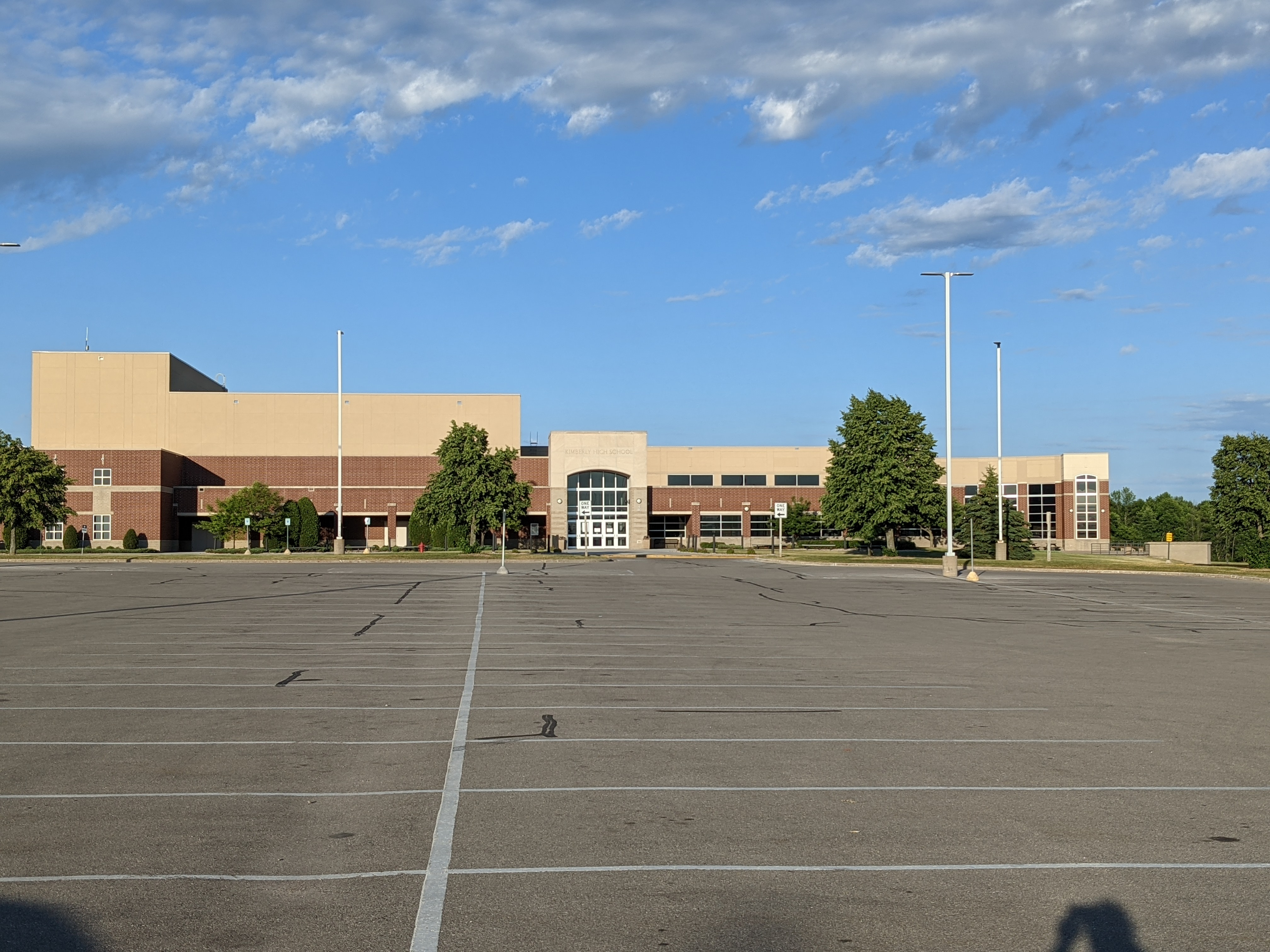

Location
- 1662 E Kennedy Ave; Kimberly, Wisconsin 54136; United States; 44.26149°N 88.31932°W

Information
- Type: Public secondary
- School district: Kimberly Area School District
- Principal: Jacqueline DePeau
- Teaching staff: 105.39 (FTE)
- Grades: 9–12
- Enrollment: 1,571 (2023–2024)
- Student to teacher ratio: 14.91
- Colors: Red and white
- Athletics conference: Fox Valley Association
- Mascot: Papermaker wasp
- Rival: Kaukauna Ghosts
- Website: www.kimberly.k12.wi.us/kimberly-high

The Kimberly High School in Kimberly, Wisconsin, is a public high school with around 1,600 students enrolled. It is the only high school in the Kimberly Area School District. The school has 117 certified teaching staff and 5 guidance counselors.

== Academics ==
=== AP courses ===
Kimberly High School offers 20 Advanced Placement (AP) courses.

== Athletics ==
Kimberly High School athletic offerings:
| Fall | Winter | Spring |
|---|---|---|
| Cross country (B/G); Dance; Football; Golf (G); Soccer (B); Co-op swimming (G) with Appleton West; Tennis (G); Volleyball (B/G) | Basketball (B/G); Dance; Co-op hockey (B/G), Fox Cities Stars; Co-op swimming (B) with Appleton West; Wrestling | Baseball (B); Softball (G); Golf (B); Tennis (B); Soccer (G); Track & field (B/G); Lacrosse (B/G) |

The Papermakers are a Division 1 school competing in the Fox Valley Association with other Fox Valley schools, as well as schools from the Wausau area. A historic rivalry exists between the Papermakers and the neighboring Kaukauna Ghosts. Another large rivalry has spiked over the last several years between the Papermakers and the Neenah Rockets in several sports, including football, baseball, tennis, and sometimes basketball

=== State championships ===
| Sport | Division w/ state championship year | Total |
|---|---|---|
| Baseball | B-1989, D1-2007, D1-2017 | 3 |
| Basketball (B) | D2-1994, D2-1995 | 2 |
| Basketball (G) | A-1987, B-1989, D2-1996, D2-1998 | 4 |
| Cross country (B) | D1-2015 | 1 |
| Football | D2-2007, D2-2008, D2-2013, D1-2014, D1-2015, D1-2016, D1-2017, D1-2022 | 8 |
| *Hockey (G) | 2019, 2020 | 2 |
| Softball | A-1980, A-1981, B-1988, B-1989, D2-1993, D1-2007, D1-2014 | 7 |
| Track & field (B) | B-1960, D1-2014, D1-2017, D1-2018, D1-2019 | 5 |
| *Volleyball (B) | 2019, 2021**, | 2 |
| Volleyball (G) | D2-1990 | 1 |

Kimberly High School has earned 35 Wisconsin Interscholastic Athletic Association state championship titles, the 14th most in the state across all divisions.

*Hockey and Boys Volleyball only have one division.

**For the 2020–2021 school year, the WIAA created the Alternate Fall season due to the COVID-19 pandemic, allowing schools to opt to field all/some fall sports to the Alternate Fall season, occurring between the typical winter and spring seasons. Kimberly opted to play boys volleyball in the Alternate Fall rather the typical fall season, and won the state championship.

==== Football ====
Kimberly High School's football team has back-to-back WIAA Division 2 state titles (2007–2008), another WIAA Division 2 state title in 2013, and back-to-back-to-back-to-back WIAA Division 1 state titles (2014-2017). On November 16, 2018, Kimberly High School competed in the WIAA division 1 state football tournament and lost 21–24 against Muskego High School ending their 5-year streak winning the state title. With 5 consecutive state titles and a 70-game winning streak, Kimberly held the longest active streak in high school football nationally until August 17, 2018 when the streak was snapped in a 31–28 home loss to the Fond du Lac Cardinals. In 2017, Camp Randall started a "Camp Randall 100" campaign, celebrating 100 years of the stadium. They selected 100 influential people in the stadium's history. Blair Mulholland, Kimberly running back, was named to the list, for his 464-yard, 4 touchdown game in the 2015 Wisconsin State Division 1 Football Championship.

The school's mascot is the paper wasp. The "Papermaker" wasp logo was created by Jim Nirschl, a longtime Kimberly High School art teacher, coach, and athletic director. It was voted by the student body to be named "Cornman12", but was overruled by administration thus settling on "Mack the Mighty Maker" as the mascot's official title.

==== Boys track and field ====
Kimberly High School's Boys Track and Field team has back-to-back-to-back WIAA Division 1 state titles (2017-2019).

==== Girls hockey ====
Kimberly High School doesn't have a girls (or boys) hockey team, but instead teams up with 15 other schools (Xavier, Appleton East/North/West, Fox Valley Lutheran, Freedom, Hortonville, Kaukauna, Little Chute, Menasha, Neenah, New London, St/ Mary Catholic, Two Rivers and Wrightstown) to form one girls' team, "Xavier Co-op".

At the 2019 WIAA state championship at the Alliant Energy Center, #1 Xavier Co-op played #4 Sun Prairie Co-op in the semifinals, with Xavier winning 3–1. In the championship game, Xavier Co-op played #3 Hudson High School (Wisconsin). The game went into double OT, with Xavier Co-op winning 6–5.

==== Softball ====
At the 2014 WIAA state championship held at the Goodman Softball Complex, Kimberly Softball defeated Westosha Central 6–5. Left fielder Carleigh Johnson hit a home run to left center, giving Kimberly the win. A notable game as it went to 15 innings, with games only going to 7. Kimberly had 27 wins and only 3 losses that season.

Following the 2014 state championship win, the Kimberly softball team had won their way to the state tournament again. However, losing in the quarterfinals, 16–2, against Watertown High School (Wisconsin).

==== Athletic conference affiliation history ====
- Little Nine Conference (1928-1950)
- Mid-Valley Conference (1946-1950)
- Northeastern Wisconsin Conference (1950-1952)
- Mid-Eastern Conference (1952-1970)
- Fox Valley Association (1970–present)

== Controversies ==
Kimberly High School has been in the local media news regarding situations of racism in the student body. The first reported incident occurred in January 2018, when a white student wrote the n-word on the desk of an African American peer. The student was given a 5-day suspension, and counseling offered to the victim. The superintendent at the time, Robert Mayfield, released a statement to Action 2 News saying, "The actions of one individual do not represent the values of 5,000 students." The victim came forward publicly after the story broke, Isabella Brown, saying "Be kind you know, be respectful to others."

The second reported incident occurred in February 2021, when an Instagram account was created with the Kimberly logo promoting a "White Club". The school administrators deny any sort of involvement with this account, "Let me be clear. We do not and would not have a club like this here at Kimberly High School. We stand against racism, and this type of behavior will simply not be tolerated", said Principal DePeau.

Another incident that did not receive local media attention was the creation of a petition on Change.org urging the district to implement changes to be more "Inclusive for BIPOC Students", in the summer of 2020. The petition lists changes that the district should implement, and attention for the petition rose after the "White Club" incident of 2021. The petition has more than 2,500 signatures, and the district did not make any changes after the petition.

== Notable alumni ==
=== Sports ===
- Mike Verstegen (class of 1990), former professional football player in the NFL
- A. J. Klein (class of 2009), former professional football player in the NFL
- Paul Schommer (class of 2010), 2022 and 2026 Winter Olympic Games athlete in the biathlon
- Logan Bruss (class of 2017), professional football player in the NFL

== Local/state/national rankings ==
Niche has given the Kimberly Area School District the following rankings:
| Local | #1 of 22 best school district in the Appleton area #1 of 7 best school district in Outagamie County |
| State | #1 of 367 best school district for athletes in Wisconsin |
| National | #7 of 10,815 best school district for athletes in the United States |

Niche has given Kimberly High School the following rankings:
| Local | #1 of 30 best public high school in the Appleton area & Outagamie County #1 of 30 best public high school teachers in Appleton area & Outagamie County |
| State | #2 of 598 best high school for athletes in Wisconsin |
| National | #21 of 25,705 best high school for athletes in the United States |
