= Fox River Classic Conference =

Wisconsin high school athletic conference

- Conference: WIAA
- Founded: 2007
- Commissioner: Steve Kestly; Dave Steavpack
- No. of teams: 10
- Headquarters: Green Bay, Wisconsin
- Website: www.frccathletics.com

The Fox River Classic Conference (often shortened to FRCC) is a high school athletic conference with its membership based in northeastern Wisconsin. Founded in 2007, the conference and its member schools are affiliated with the Wisconsin Interscholastic Athletic Association.

== History ==
The Fox River Classic Conference was formed in 2007 when four members of the Bay Conference (Ashwaubenon, Bay Port, De Pere and Pulaski) joined with the eight members of the shuttered Fox River Valley Conference (Green Bay East, Green Bay Preble, Green Bay Southwest, Green Bay West, Manitowoc Lincoln, Notre Dame Academy, Sheboygan North and Sheboygan South). One of the reasons this was done was to create greater parity among conferences in the region, as the four schools in the Green Bay suburbs were some of the largest in the Bay Conference. This realignment also brought more high schools in the Green Bay metropolitan area closer together for travel purposes.

As early as 2011, both Green Bay East and Green Bay West requested to leave the Fox River Classic Conference, citing an inability to compete and desire to maintain their football rivalry. In January 2014, the WIAA approved a realignment plan that would move Green Bay East and Green Bay West out of the FRCC and into the Bay Conference, a plan that took effect for the 2015–16 school year. The FRCC's membership roster remained stable until 2025, when Sheboygan South exited to join the new Glacier Trails Conference, with the arrival of former Bay Conference member West De Pere as their replacement.

=== Football-only alignment ===
In February 2019, in conjunction with the Wisconsin Football Coaches Association, the WIAA released a sweeping football-only realignment for Wisconsin, set to commence with the 2020 football season and run on a two-year cycle. This plan would not take effect for FRCC members until 2021, as the conference made the decision to cancel the 2020 fall season due to the COVID-19 pandemic. A temporary conference was formed for the alternate spring 2021 competition season called the Fox Valley Classic Conference, and it included all FRCC members (with the exception of Notre Dame) along with members of the former Valley Football Association. When the WIAA/WFCA realignment plan was finally implemented for the 2021 football season, the conference added former full members Green Bay East and Green Bay West as football-only members, along with Menasha and West De Pere of the Bay Conference:

North Division	South Division
Ashwaubenon	Green Bay East
Bay Port	Green Bay West
De Pere	Manitowoc Lincoln
Green Bay Preble	Menasha
Green Bay Southwest	Notre Dame Academy
Pulaski	Sheboygan North
West De Pere	Sheboygan South

This alignment continued through the 2022-2023 football competition cycle. and added two new football-only members for the 2024-2025 cycle: Appleton West of the Wisconsin Valley Conference and Oshkosh North of the Fox Valley Association. Appleton West was added to the FRCC's North Division, while Oshkosh West joined the South Division. The Fox River Classic Conference's football alignment will be maintained at sixteen schools over two divisions through at least the 2027 football season.

== List of conference members ==
=== Current full members ===
School	Location	Affiliation	Enrollment	Mascot	Colors	Joined
Ashwaubenon	Ashwaubenon, WI	Public	1,004	Jaguars		2007
Bay Port	Suamico, WI	Public	1,897	Pirates		2007
De Pere	De Pere, WI	Public	1,437	Redbirds		2007
Green Bay Preble	Green Bay, WI	Public	2,216	Hornets		2007
Green Bay Southwest	Green Bay, WI	Public	1,040	Trojans		2007
Manitowoc Lincoln	Manitowoc, WI	Public	1,363	Ships		2007
Notre Dame Academy	Green Bay, WI	Private (Catholic)	729	Tritons		2007
Pulaski	Pulaski, WI	Public	1,099	Red Raiders		2007
Sheboygan North	Sheboygan, WI	Public	1,651	Golden Raiders		2007
West De Pere	De Pere, WI	Public	1,070	Phantoms		2025

=== Current associate members ===
School	Location	Affiliation	Mascot	Colors	Primary Conference	Sport(s)
Appleton West	Appleton, WI	Public	Terrors		Fox Valley Association	Football
Green Bay East	Green Bay, WI	Public	Red Devils		Bay	Football
Green Bay West	Green Bay, WI	Public	Wildcats		Bay	Football
Menasha	Menasha, WI	Public	Blue Jays		Bay	Football
Oshkosh North	Oshkosh, WI	Public	Spartans		Fox Valley Association	Football
Sheboygan South	Sheboygan, WI	Public	Redwings		Glacier Trails	Football

=== Current co-operative members ===
Team	Colors	Host School	Co-operative Members	Sport(s)
Bay Area Storm		Ashwaubenon	Bay Port, Pulaski, Seymour, Wrightstown	Boys Hockey
Green Bay United		Green Bay Southwest	Green Bay East, Green Bay Preble, Green Bay West	Boys Swim & Dive, Girls Swim & Dive
Manitowoc United		Manitowoc Lincoln	Manitowoc Lutheran, Mishicot, Reedsville, Roncalli, Two Rivers, Valders	Boys Hockey
Sheboygan Red Raiders		Sheboygan South	Sheboygan North, Cedar Grove-Belgium, Elkhart Lake-Glenbeulah, Grafton, Howards Grove, Kiel, Kohler, Oostburg, Plymouth, Port Washington, Sheboygan Christian, Sheboygan Falls, Sheboygan Lutheran	Boys Hockey
Sheboygan United		Sheboygan North	Howards Grove, Sheboygan South	Girls Swim & Dive

=== Former members ===
School	Location	Affiliation	Mascot	Colors	Joined	Left	Conference Joined	Current Conference
Green Bay East	Green Bay, WI	Public	Red Devils		2007	2015	Bay	
Green Bay West	Green Bay, WI	Public	Wildcats		2007	2015	Bay	
Sheboygan South	Sheboygan, WI	Public	Redwings		2007	2025	Glacier Trails	

=== Former football-only members ===
School	Location	Affiliation	Mascot	Colors	Seasons	Primary Conference
West De Pere	De Pere, WI	Public	Phantoms		2021-2024	Bay

== Membership timeline ==
=== Full members ===
East Division West Division

=== Football members ===
North Division South Division

== Membership map ==
Fox River Classic Conference
Location of Fox River Classic Conference full members:
1 Ashwaubenon
2 Bay Port
3 De Pere
4 Green Bay Preble
5 Green Bay Southwest
6 Manitowoc Lincoln
7 Notre Dame Academy
8 Pulaski
9 Sheboygan North
10 West De Pere

== Sponsored sports ==
	Baseball	Boys Basketball	Girls Basketball	Boys Cross Country	Girls Cross Country	Football	Boys Golf	Girls Golf	Boys Hockey	Boys Soccer	Girls Soccer	Softball	Boys Swim & Dive	Girls Swim & Dive	Boys Tennis	Girls Tennis	Boys Track & Field	Girls Track & Field	Girls Volleyball	Boys Wrestling	Girls Wrestling
Ashwaubenon	●	●	●	●	●	●	●	●	● (Note: Bay Area Storm co-operative)	●	●	●	●	●	●	●	●	●	●	●	●
Bay Port	●	●	●	●	●	●	●	●		●	●	●	●	●	●	●	●	●	●	●	●
De Pere	●	●	●	●	●	●	●	●	● (Note: Co-operative with West De Pere)	●	●	●		●	●	●	●	●	●	●	●
Green Bay Preble	●	●	●	●	●	●	●	● (Note: Co-operative with Green Bay East, Green Bay Southwest and Green Bay West)		●	●	●			●	●	●	●	●	●	●
Green Bay Southwest	●	●	●	●	●	●	● (Note: Co-operative with Green Bay West)			●	●	●	● (Note: Green Bay United co-operative)	●	●	●	●	●	●		
Manitowoc Lincoln	●	●	●	●	●	●	●	●	● (Note: Manitowoc United co-operative)	●	●	●	●	●	●	●	●	●	●	●	●
Notre Dame Academy	●	●	●	●	●	●	●	●	●	●	●	●	● (Note: Co-operative with Southern Door)	● (Note: Co-operative with N.E.W. Lutheran)	●	●	●	●	●		●
Pulaski	●	●	●	●	●	●	●	●		●	●	●	●	●	●	●	●	●	●	●	●
Sheboygan North	●	●	●	●	●	●	●	● (Note: Co-operative with Sheboygan South and Oostburg)		●	●		● (Note: Co-operative with Howards Grove and Kohler)	● (Note: Sheboygan United co-operative)	●	●	●	●	●	●	●
West De Pere	●	●	●	●	●	●	●	●		●	●	●			●	●	●	●	●	●	●

== List of state champions ==
=== Fall sports ===
Girls Cross Country
School	Year	Division
Notre Dame Academy	2014	Division 2

Football
School	Year	Division
Notre Dame Academy	2015	Division 3
Bay Port	2024	Division 1
Notre Dame Academy	2024	Division 3
West De Pere	2025	Division 2

Girls Golf
School	Year	Division
Notre Dame Academy	2007	Division 1
Notre Dame Academy	2008	Division 1

Boys Soccer
School	Year	Division
Notre Dame Academy	2007	Division 2
Notre Dame Academy	2008	Division 2

Girls Tennis
School	Year	Division
Notre Dame Academy	2008	Division 2
Notre Dame Academy	2009	Division 2
Notre Dame Academy	2010	Division 2

=== Winter sports ===
Boys Basketball
School	Year	Division
Pulaski	2013	Division 2
De Pere	2023	Division 1

Girls Basketball
School	Year	Division
De Pere	2012	Division 1
Notre Dame Academy	2013	Division 2
Notre Dame Academy	2014	Division 2
Bay Port	2019	Division 1
Notre Dame Academy	2021	Division 2
Notre Dame Academy	2022	Division 2
Notre Dame Academy	2023	Division 2

=== Spring sports ===
Baseball
School	Year	Division
Bay Port	2009	Division 1
Bay Port	2010	Division 1
De Pere	2024	Division 1

Boys Golf
School	Year	Division
Notre Dame Academy	2011	Division 2
Sheboygan North	2023	Division 1

Girls Soccer
School	Year	Division
Bay Port	2018	Division 1
Notre Dame Academy	2018	Division 3

Boys Tennis
School	Year	Division
Notre Dame Academy	2012	Division 2
Notre Dame Academy	2019	Division 2

Boys Track & Field
School	Year	Division
Bay Port	2015	Division 1
De Pere	2025	Division 1
Notre Dame Academy	2025	Division 2

Girls Track & Field
School	Year	Division
Notre Dame Academy	2010	Division 2

== List of conference champions ==
=== Boys Basketball ===
School	Quantity	Years
De Pere	11	2010, 2011, 2012, 2013, 2014, 2015, 2022, 2023, 2024, 2025, 2026
Bay Port	6	2008, 2009, 2011, 2017, 2018, 2020
Ashwaubenon	1	2014
Green Bay Southwest	1	2019
Sheboygan North	1	2016
Green Bay East	0	
Green Bay Preble	0	
Green Bay West	0	
Manitowoc Lincoln	0	
Notre Dame Academy	0	
Pulaski	0	
Sheboygan South	0	
West De Pere	0	

=== Girls Basketball ===
School	Quantity	Years
De Pere	7	2008, 2009, 2010, 2012, 2013, 2017, 2025
Notre Dame Academy	5	2016, 2022, 2023, 2024, 2026
Bay Port	3	2018, 2019, 2020
Pulaski	2	2010, 2011
Sheboygan North	2	2014, 2015
Ashwaubenon	0	
Green Bay East	0	
Green Bay Preble	0	
Green Bay Southwest	0	
Green Bay West	0	
Manitowoc Lincoln	0	
Sheboygan South	0	
West De Pere	0	

=== Football ===
School	Quantity	Years
Bay Port	9	2007, 2009, 2014, 2016, 2017, 2018, 2019, 2022, 2023
Notre Dame Academy	5	2008, 2023, 2024, 2025, 2026
Ashwaubenon	3	2007, 2010, 2013
West De Pere	3	2024, 2025, 2026
De Pere	2	2007, 2015
Menasha	2	2021, 2022
Green Bay Southwest	1	2012
Manitowoc Lincoln	1	2011
Appleton West	0	
Green Bay East	0	
Green Bay Preble	0	
Green Bay West	0	
Oshkosh North	0	
Pulaski	0	
Sheboygan North	0	
Sheboygan South	0	

=== Boys Hockey ===
School	Quantity	Years
Notre Dame Academy	11	2011, 2012, 2013, 2014, 2015, 2017, 2018, (Note: Not recognized by FRCC due to WIAA rules violations) 2019, 2020, 2022, 2023, 2025
Bay Port	3	2015, 2016, 2024
Ashwaubenon	1	2011
De Pere	1	2026
Bay Area Storm	0	
Green Bay United	0	
Manitowoc United	0	
Shawano/ Pulaski	0	
Sheboygan	0	
