= Ashwaubenon High School =

Location
- 2391 S. Ridge Rd. Ashwaubenon, Wisconsin; US; 44°29′19″N 88°4′30″W

Information
- Type: Public secondary
- Motto: Big enough to serve you-small enough to know you
- Established: 1965
- School district: Ashwaubenon School District
- Principal: Dirk Ribbens
- Teaching staff: 63.42 (FTE)
- Grades: 9–12
- Enrollment: 1,004 (2023–2024)
- Student to teacher ratio: 15.83
- Colors: Green and yellow
- Athletics conference: Fox River Classic Conference
- Mascot: Jaguar
- Rival: Bay Port High School
- Yearbook: The Paw
- Website: Ashwaubenon High School

Ashwaubenon High School is a public high school located in Ashwaubenon, Wisconsin, United States. A community pool and performing arts center are also housed within the school.

== Demographics ==
AHS is 79% white, 6% Hispanic, 4% Native American, 3% black, and 2% Asian. 6% of students identify as two or more races.

== Academics ==
Ashwaubenon High School offers Advanced Placement (AP) classes, which about a third of students take.

== Athletics ==
The Ashwaubenon Jaguar football team won the WIAA Division 2 state championship in 1996, 2000, 2001, and 2006.

The softball team won Division 1 state championships in 1992, 1993, 1994, and 2006.

=== Athletic conference affiliation history ===
- Northeastern Wisconsin Conference (1966-1970)
- Bay Conference (1970-2007)
- Fox River Classic Conference (2007–present)

== Extracurricular activities ==
The AHS marching band performed at the 2001 Tournament of Roses Parade and the St. Patrick's Day Parade in New York.

A referendum-funded $8 million performing arts center at the high school opened in the fall of 2016, hosting music and drama events from the school as well as other community performances.

The Jaguaress dance team claimed a Division 1 kick championship in 2018, Division 2 kick and pom championships in 2019, a Division 2 pom championship in 2021, and a Division 2 kick championship in 2023.

Ashwaubenon's Nordic skiing team won the 2020 state championship.

AHS has a competitive show choir, "Encore".

== Incidents ==
In 2008, the school made national and international headlines after it was discovered that a 33-year-old mother of two named Wendy Anne Brown had disguised herself as her teenage daughter and enrolled as a sophomore, attending classes for one day and being admitted to the cheerleading program before being caught by the police and charged with identity theft. Diagnosed with bipolar II disorder, posttraumatic stress disorder, borderline personality disorder, avoidant personality disorder and paranoid personality disorder, the court found her “not guilty by reason of mental disease.” The story was later adapted into a 2019 Lifetime movie entitled Identity Theft of a Cheerleader, starring Maiara Walsh, Karis Cameron, Jesse Irving, Naika Toussaint, Chiara Guzzo, Matty Finochio, Bzhaun Rhoden, and Gail O'Grady.

In 2017, the school again made national headlines after a parent who thought a student dressed as a stormtrooper from Star Wars for May the Fourth (Star Wars Day) was a threat to the school, resulting in an evacuation. A nearby middle school and community center were also placed on lockdown during the incident.

== Notable alumni ==
- Amari Allen (2025), basketball player
- Mason Appleton, professional ice hockey forward
- Joel Hodgson (1978), writer, television producer, and creator of Mystery Science Theater 3000
- Adam Koch (2006), basketball player
- James Morgan (2015), American football quarterback
- Aaron Stecker, NFL running back
- Mike Taylor (2008), professional football player
- Christian Wolanin (2013), NHL player
