= Eastern Valley Conference (Wisconsin) =

Wisconsin high school athletic conference (2007-2015)

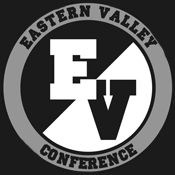
Logo of the Eastern Valley Conference

The Eastern Valley Conference is a former high school athletic conference with its membership base in the Fox Valley region of Wisconsin. Founded in 2007 and dissolved in 2015, the conference and its members belonged to the Wisconsin Interscholastic Athletic Association.

== History ==
Location of Original Eastern Valley Conference Members

The Eastern Valley Conference, originally known as the Valley 10 Conference, was founded in 2007 from the ashes of the former Valley 8 Conference. Six members from the Valley 8 (Clintonville, Fox Valley Lutheran, Freedom, Little Chute, Waupaca and Xavier) joined with four schools from the shuttered East Central Flyway Conference (Berlin, Omro, Ripon and Winneconne) to form its initial grouping. Aside from Omro leaving the conference in 2010 for membership in the Wisconsin Flyway Conference, the conference's roster stayed intact for its entire eight-year life span. The Eastern Valley Conference was dissolved in 2015, with five of the conference's outgoing members (Clintonville, Fox Valley Lutheran, Freedom, Little Chute and Waupaca) forming half of the new North Eastern Conference. Three schools (Berlin, Ripon and Winneconne) joined the reformed East Central Conference, and Xavier became members of the Bay Conference.

== Conference membership history ==
=== Final members ===
School	Location	Affiliation	Mascot	Colors	Joined	Left	Conference Joined	Current Conference
Berlin	Berlin, WI	Public	Indians		2007	2015	East Central	South Central
Clintonville	Clintonville, WI	Public	Truckers		2007	2015	North Eastern	
Fox Valley Lutheran	Appleton, WI	Private (Lutheran, WELS)	Foxes		2007	2015	North Eastern	Bay
Freedom	Freedom, WI	Public	Irish		2007	2015	North Eastern	
Little Chute	Little Chute, WI	Public	Mustangs		2007	2015	North Eastern	
Ripon	Ripon, WI	Public	Tigers		2007	2015	East Central	South Central
Waupaca	Waupaca, WI	Public	Comets		2007	2015	North Eastern	
Winneconne	Winneconne, WI	Public	Wolves		2007	2015	East Central	Bay
Xavier	Appleton, WI	Private (Catholic)	Hawks		2007	2015	Bay	

=== Previous members ===
School	Location	Affiliation	Mascot	Colors	Joined	Left	Conference Joined	Current Conference
Omro	Omro, WI	Public	Foxes		2007	2010	Wisconsin Flyway	

== List of state champions ==
=== Fall sports ===
Football
School	Year	Division
Waupaca	2008	Division 3
Winneconne	2013	Division 4

Boys Soccer
School	Year	Division
Fox Valley Lutheran	2009	Division 2
Xavier	2012	Division 2

=== Winter sports ===
Boys Wrestling
School	Year	Division
Freedom	2015	Division 2

=== Spring sports ===
Baseball
School	Year	Division
Ripon	2011	Division 2

Boys Golf
School	Year	Division
Xavier	2008	Division 2

Girls Soccer
School	Year	Division
Xavier	2008	Division 2

Boys Track & Field
School	Year	Division
Freedom	2015	Division 2

== List of conference champions ==
=== Boys Basketball ===
School	Quantity	Years
Little Chute	4	2010, 2011, 2012, 2013
Xavier	4	2008, 2009, 2014, 2015
Berlin	0	
Clintonville	0	
Fox Valley Lutheran	0	
Freedom	0	
Omro	0	
Ripon	0	
Waupaca	0	
Winneconne	0	

=== Girls Basketball ===
School	Quantity	Years
Freedom	4	2009, 2010, 2011, 2012
Fox Valley Lutheran	3	2012, 2013, 2014
Little Chute	1	2015
Ripon	1	2008
Xavier	1	2013
Berlin	0	
Clintonville	0	
Omro	0	
Waupaca	0	
Winneconne	0	

=== Football ===
School	Quantity	Years
Waupaca	6	2007, 2008, 2009, 2011, 2012, 2013
Xavier	3	2009, 2010, 2011
Clintonville	1	2007
Freedom	1	2014
Berlin	0	
Fox Valley Lutheran	0	
Little Chute	0	
Omro	0	
Ripon	0	
Winneconne	0	
