= Little Nine Conference =

Wisconsin high school athletic conference (1928-1970)

The Little Nine Conference is a former high school athletic conference in Wisconsin. Operational from 1928 to 1970, its membership was concentrated in east central Wisconsin and all member schools belonged to the Wisconsin Interscholastic Athletic Association.

== History ==
=== 1928–1950 ===
Location of Original Little Nine Conference Members

The Little Nine Conference was founded in 1928 by a group of nine small high schools in the Fox River Valley: Bear Creek, Brillion, Denmark, Hortonville, Kimberly, Little Chute (not related to the current high school), Pulaski, Seymour and Wrightstown. Hilbert joined the following year to put membership at ten schools. In 1930, Reedsville joined the Little Nine Conference, replacing the original Little Chute High School, which closed and redistricted to Appleton and Kaukauna. The Little Nine also split into Eastern and Western Divisions that year:

Eastern Division	Western Division
Brillion	Bear Creek
Denmark	Hortonville
Hilbert	Kimberly
Reedsville	Pulaski
Wrightstown	Seymour

In 1931, conference membership increased to twelve schools as Freedom and Shiocton joined the Little Nine. Stockbridge was also invited to join the Little Nine that year but declined the invite. Freedom was placed in the Eastern Division while Shiocton was placed in the Western Division:

Eastern Division	Western Division
Brillion	Bear Creek
Denmark	Hortonville
Freedom	Kimberly
Hilbert	Pulaski
Reedsville	Seymour
Wrightstown	Shiocton

Pulaski left the conference in 1933 to compete independent of conference affiliation, and two schools swapped divisions with Freedom moving to the Western Division and Kimberly to the Eastern Division. Two years later, Winneconne joined the Little Nine Conference from the Little 6-C Conference to bring membership back up to twelve schools. They took up residence in the Western Division to give the conference two six-team divisions:

Eastern Division	Western Division
Brillion	Bear Creek
Denmark	Freedom
Hilbert	Hortonville
Kimberly	Seymour
Reedsville	Shiocton
Wrightstown	Winneconne

Seymour and Wrightstown swapped division affiliation in 1937, and the conference would maintain this alignment for twelve years. Football was added as a sponsored sport in 1947 with five schools (Brillion, Denmark, Shiocton Winneconne and Wrightstown) participating. In 1950, Kimberly and Seymour left to join the Northeastern Wisconsin Conference, leaving membership at ten schools. Divisions were also abolished that year, and the Little Nine competed as a single entity for the rest of its history.

=== 1950–1970 ===
Location of Final Little Nine Conference Members

The Little Nine Conference remained a fairly stable loop in terms of membership with few changes occurring during the last two decades of the conference's run. Brillion left in 1951 to join the Eastern Wisconsin Conference, they were not replaced until 1956 when Omro joined the Little Nine from the Big 7-C Conference. Brillion would return in 1965 to replace Bear Creek after they left the conference to compete in the Wolf River Valley Conference for the remainder of their history. The Little Nine Conference continued as a ten-member circuit before disbanding in 1970. Six schools moved on to the new Olympian Conference (Brillion, Denmark, Freedom, Hilbert, Reedsville and Wrightstown), three joined the new East Central Conference (Hortonville, Omro and Winneconne), and Shiocton was accepted into the Central Wisconsin Conference.

== Conference membership history ==
=== Final members ===
School	Location	Affiliation	Mascot	Colors	Joined	Left	Conference Joined	Current Conference
Brillion	Brillion, WI	Public	Lions		1928, 1965	1951, 1970	Eastern Wisconsin, Olympian	Eastern Wisconsin
Denmark	Denmark, WI	Public	Vikings		1928	1970	Olympian	North Eastern
Freedom	Freedom, WI	Public	Irish		1931	1970	Olympian	North Eastern
Hilbert	Hilbert, WI	Public	Wolves		1929	1970	Olympian	Big East
Hortonville	Hortonville, WI	Public	Polar Bears		1928	1970	East Central	Fox Valley Association
Omro	Omro, WI	Public	Foxes		1956	1970	East Central	Wisconsin Flyway
Reedsville	Reedsville, WI	Public	Panthers		1930	1970	Olympian	Big East
Shiocton	Shiocton, WI	Public	Chiefs		1931	1970	Central Wisconsin	
Winneconne	Winneconne, WI	Public	Wolves		1935	1970	East Central	Bay (2025)
Wrightstown	Wrightstown, WI	Public	Tigers		1928	1970	Olympian	North Eastern

=== Previous members ===
School	Location	Affiliation	Mascot	Colors	Joined	Left	Conference Joined	Current Conference
Bear Creek	Bear Creek, WI	Public	Bruins		1928	1965	Wolf River Valley	Closed in 1969 (consolidated into Clintonville)
Kimberly	Kimberly, WI	Public	Papermakers		1928	1950	Northeastern Wisconsin	Fox Valley Association
Little Chute	Little Chute, WI	Public	Purple and Gold		1928	1930	Closed (district split between Appleton and Kaukauna)	
Pulaski	Pulaski, WI	Public	Red Raiders		1928	1933	Independent	Fox River Classic
Seymour	Seymour, WI	Public	Indians		1928	1950	Northeastern Wisconsin	Bay

== Membership timeline ==
=== Full members ===
Eastern Division Western Division

== List of conference champions ==
=== Boys Basketball ===
School	Quantity	Years
Hortonville	13	1931, 1933, 1938, 1939, 1942, 1947, 1948, 1949, 1952, 1953, 1957, 1958, 1959
Winneconne	11	1940, 1942, 1944, 1945, 1951, 1956, 1962, 1965, 1966, 1967, 1968
Kimberly	10	1932, 1934, 1938, 1939, 1940, 1944, 1946, 1947, 1948, 1949
Reedsville	8	1931, 1932, 1933, 1936, 1945, 1946, 1963, 1964
Seymour	7	1934, 1935, 1936, 1937, 1941, 1942, 1949
Hilbert	6	1943, 1950, 1955, 1963, 1964, 1965
Denmark	5	1930, 1937, 1938, 1955, 1962
Bear Creek	3	1938, 1941, 1954
Omro	3	1968, 1969, 1970
Brillion	2	1929, 1935
Freedom	2	1945, 1946
Shiocton	2	1960, 1961
Little Chute	0	
Pulaski	0	
Wrightstown	0	

=== Football ===
School	Quantity	Years
Winneconne	8	1947, 1949, 1950, 1951, 1953, 1954, 1955, 1957
Denmark	8	1952, 1954, 1960, 1961, 1963, 1965, 1966, 1969
Freedom	4	1957, 1961, 1964, 1965
Wrightstown	4	1948, 1954, 1962, 1968
Brillion	3	1948, 1967, 1968
Hortonville	3	1956, 1957, 1969
Reedsville	3	1957, 1958, 1959
Omro	1	1963
Hilbert	0	
Shiocton	0	
