= East Central Conference =

Wisconsin high school athletics conference (1970-2015)

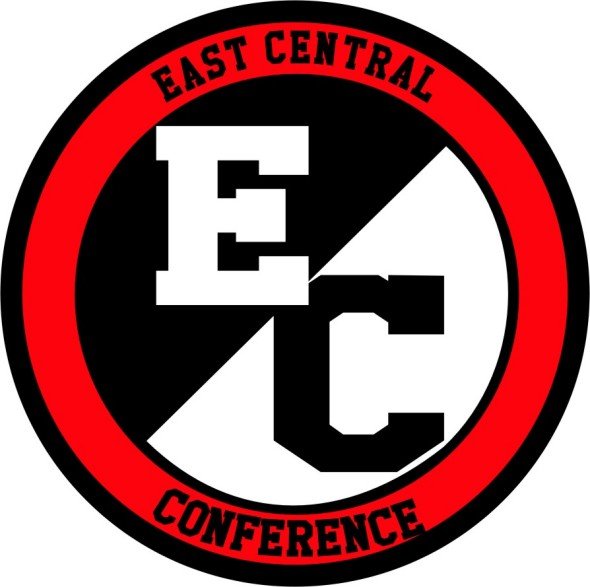

The East Central Conference is a former high school athletic conference in Wisconsin. Originally founded in 1970, it was disbanded in 2001 and remained defunct until its reconstitution in 2015. It lasted for ten seasons before a second dissolution in 2025, and all members in both incarnations belonged to the Wisconsin Interscholastic Athletic Association.

== History ==
=== 1970–2001 ===
Location of Original East Central Conference Members (1970)

The East Central Conference was founded in 1970 by eight medium-sized high schools in east central Wisconsin. Six of the eight schools were displaced by the dissolution of their previous conferences: three from the Little Nine Conference (Hortonville, Omro and Winneconne), two from the Little Ten Conference (Berlin and Ripon) and New London of the Mid-Eastern Conference. Former Central Wisconsin Conference members Waupaca and Weyauwega rounded out the original eight. In 1973, Weyauwega left the East Central Conference to rejoin the CWC, and Little Chute joined from the CWC as their replacement the following year. In 1979, New London exited for membership in the Bay Conference with Wautoma moving over from the CWC to maintain an eight-member conference. Aside from Waupun replacing Wautoma as a football-only member in 1995, the all-sport membership roster would remain intact for the next twenty years. In 1999, Hortonville, Little Chute and Waupaca became charter members of the Valley 8 Conference. Laconia and Markesan joined the ECC from the neighboring Flyway Conference to take the vacated members' place. For football, the two new members stayed in the Flyway Conference, with Mayville and St. Mary's Springs in Fond du Lac joining as football-only members. Two years later, the seven schools of the East Central Conference merged with the nine members of the Flyway Conference to form the East Central Flyway Conference.

=== 2015–2025 ===
Location of Original East Central Conference Members (2015)

During the realignment of several conferences within northeastern Wisconsin, eight schools (Berlin, Campbellsport, Kettle Moraine Lutheran, Kewaskum, Plymouth, Ripon, Waupun and Winneconne) joined together to form a new East Central Conference in 2015. Three of the members of the new ECC were also members of the original conference (Berlin, Ripon and Winneconne). In 2021, after a previous unsuccessful attempt two years prior, Campbellsport left the East Central Conference to join the Wisconsin Flyway Conference, leaving the ECC with seven members. That same year, Berlin and Ripon requested a move to the nearby South Central Conference due to declining enrollment and competitive disparity. Winneconne also requested a shift to the Bay Conference due to its growth and West De Pere's desire to move to the larger Fox River Classic Conference. Both requests were denied by the WIAA Task Force due to a lack of solution to move the other four schools. In December 2023, the other four schools requested an exit from the East Central Conference. Kettle Moraine Lutheran wanted to join other private schools in the Midwest Classic Conference, Kewaskum and Plymouth sought membership in the North Shore Conference and Waupun requested a shift to the Capitol Conference. After some deliberation, the decision was made to disband the East Central Conference and disperse its member schools to other conference. Berlin and Ripon joined the South Central Conference, Waupun became members of the Capitol Conference, Winneconne was accepted into the Bay Conference and the remaining three schools (Kettle Moraine Lutheran, Kewaskum and Plymouth) combined with four other schools (Port Washington, Sheboygan South, West Bend East and West Bend West) to form the Glacier Trails Conference.

=== Football-only alignment (2020-2025) ===
In February 2019, in conjunction with the Wisconsin Football Coaches Association, the WIAA released a sweeping football-only realignment for Wisconsin to commence with the 2020 football season and run on a two-year cycle. The East Central Conference retained six members for football (Berlin, Kettle Moraine Lutheran, Kewaskum, Plymouth, Ripon and Waupun) and welcomed two football-only members: Port Washington of the North Shore Conference, and Sheboygan Falls of the Eastern Wisconsin Conference. This alignment remained in place for the 2022-2023 realignment cycle. For the 2024-2025 cycle, the East Central Conference was whittled down to six members, with returnees Kettle Moraine Lutheran, Kewaskum, Plymouth and Port Washington being joined by Beaver Dam and Watertown of the Badger Conference. The East Central Conference was realigned out of existence for the 2026-2027 realignment cycle.

== Conference membership history ==
=== 1970-2001 ===
==== Final members ====
School	Location	Affiliation	Mascot	Colors	Joined	Left	Conference Joined	Current Conference
Berlin	Berlin, WI	Public	Indians		1970	2001	East Central Flyway	South Central
Laconia	Rosendale, WI	Public	Spartans		1999	2001	East Central Flyway	Wisconsin Flyway
Markesan	Markesan, WI	Public	Hornets		1999	2001	East Central Flyway	Trailways
Omro	Omro, WI	Public	Foxes		1970	2001	East Central Flyway	Wisconsin Flyway
Ripon	Ripon, WI	Public	Tigers		1970	2001	East Central Flyway	South Central
Wautoma	Wautoma, WI	Public	Hornets		1979	2001	East Central Flyway	South Central
Winneconne	Winneconne, WI	Public	Wolves		1970	2001	East Central Flyway	Bay

==== Previous members ====
School	Location	Affiliation	Mascot	Colors	Joined	Left	Conference Joined	Current Conference
Hortonville	Hortonville, WI	Public	Polar Bears		1970	1999	Valley 8	Fox Valley Association
Little Chute	Little Chute, WI	Public	Mustangs		1974	1999	Valley 8	North Eastern
New London	New London, WI	Public	Bulldogs		1970	1979	Bay	
Waupaca	Waupaca, WI	Public	Comets		1970	1999	Valley 8	North Eastern
Weyauwega	Weyauwega, WI	Public	Indians		1970	1973	Central Wisconsin	

==== Football-only members ====
School	Location	Affiliation	Mascot	Colors	Seasons	Primary Conference
Waupun	Waupun, WI	Public	Warriors		1995-2000	Wisconsin Little Ten
Mayville	Mayville, WI	Public	Cardinals		1999-2000	Flyway
St. Mary's Springs	Fond du Lac, WI	Private (Catholic)	Ledgers		1999-2000	Flyway

=== 2015-2025 ===
==== Final members ====
School	Location	Affiliation	Mascot	Colors	Joined	Left	Conference Joined	Current Conference
Berlin	Berlin, WI	Public	Indians		2015	2025	South Central	
Kettle Moraine Lutheran	Jackson, WI	Private (Lutheran, WELS)	Chargers		2015	2025	Glacier Trails	
Kewaskum	Kewaskum, WI	Public	Indians		2015	2025	Glacier Trails	
Plymouth	Plymouth, WI	Public	Panthers		2015	2025	Glacier Trails	
Ripon	Ripon, WI	Public	Tigers		2015	2025	South Central	
Waupun	Waupun, WI	Public	Warriors		2015	2025	Capitol	
Winneconne	Winneconne, WI	Public	Wolves		2015	2025	Bay	

==== Previous members ====
School	Location	Affiliation	Mascot	Colors	Joined	Left	Conference Joined	Current Conference
Campbellsport	Campbellsport, WI	Public	Cougars		2015	2021	Wisconsin Flyway	

==== Football-only members ====
School	Location	Affiliation	Mascot	Colors	Seasons	Primary Conference
Port Washington	Port Washington, WI	Public	Pirates		2020-2023	North Shore
Sheboygan Falls	Sheboygan Falls, WI	Public	Falcons		2020-2023	Eastern Wisconsin
Beaver Dam	Beaver Dam, WI	Public	Golden Beavers		2024-2025	Badger
Watertown	Watertown	Public	Goslings		2024-2025	Badger

== List of state champions ==
=== Fall sports ===
Boys Cross Country
School	Year	Division
Berlin	1978	Class B

Girls Cross Country
School	Year	Division
Winneconne	2020	Division 2

Girls Volleyball
School	Year	Division
Ripon	1998	Division 2

=== Winter sports ===
Boys Basketball
School	Year	Division
Wautoma	1980	Class B
Omro	1997	Division 3
Waupun	2016	Division 3

Girls Basketball
School	Year	Division
Waupun	2022	Division 3
Kewaskum	2023	Division 3

Boys Swimming & Diving
School	Year	Division
Berlin	2001	Division 2

=== Spring sports ===
Baseball
School	Year	Division
Hortonville	1987	Class B
Ripon	1988	Class B
Winneconne	1992	Division 2
Hortonville	1997	Division 2
Hortonville	1998	Division 2
Waupun	2018	Division 2

Girls Soccer
School	Year	Division
Plymouth	2023	Division 3
Plymouth	2024	Division 3

Softball
School	Year	Division
Hortonville	1996	Division 2
Waupun	2024	Division 2

Boys Track & Field
School	Year	Division
Berlin	1986	Class B
Wautoma	1990	Class B

== List of conference champions ==
=== Boys Basketball ===
School	Quantity	Years
Little Chute	6	1977, 1986, 1987, 1994, 1996, 1997
Omro	6	1993, 1995, 1996, 1998, 1999, 2001
Ripon	6	1971, 1972, 1984, 1993, 1999, 2017
Winneconne	6	1975, 1976, 1978, 1982, 1987, 1997
Waupaca	5	1973, 1974, 1988, 1989, 1999
Waupun	5	2016, 2018, 2019, 2024, 2025
Hortonville	4	1983, 1984, 1985, 1992
Berlin	3	1977, 1990, 1991
Kettle Moraine Lutheran	3	2018, 2022, 2023
Plymouth	3	2020, 2021, 2024
Wautoma	3	1980, 1981, 1983
New London	2	1976, 1979
Laconia	1	2000
Campbellsport	0	
Kewaskum	0	
Markesan	0	
Weyauwega	0	

=== Girls Basketball ===
School	Quantity	Years
Hortonville	7	1984, 1985, 1986, 1987, 1988, 1992, 1997
Little Chute	7	1980, 1982, 1989, 1990, 1991, 1993, 1994
Kettle Moraine Lutheran	5	2016, 2018, 2019, 2024, 2025
Waupun	5	2020, 2021, 2022, 2023, 2024
Waupaca	4	1995, 1996, 1998, 1999
Winneconne	4	1977, 1983, 1984, 2001
Omro	3	1976, 1977, 1978
Berlin	1	1988
Kewaskum	1	2023
Markesan	1	2000
New London	1	1975
Plymouth	1	2017
Ripon	1	1979
Wautoma	1	1981
Campbellsport	0	
Laconia	0	
Weyauwega	0	

=== Football ===
School	Quantity	Years
Little Chute	9	1974, 1977, 1978, 1979, 1980, 1981, 1983, 1985, 1986
Waupaca	9	1987, 1988, 1991, 1993, 1994, 1995, 1996, 1997, 1998
Berlin	7	1970, 1985, 1988, 1989, 1990, 1992, 2016
Plymouth	5	2016, 2019, 2020, 2021, 2025
Ripon	5	1972, 1973, 1975, 1976, 1984
Kewaskum	4	2015, 2016, 2017, 2022
Winneconne	4	1985, 1995, 2000, 2018
Port Washington	2	2023, 2024
St. Mary's Springs	2	1999, 2000
Beaver Dam	1	2024
Hortonville	1	1984
Mayville	1	2000
New London	1	1978
Omro	1	1971
Wautoma	1	1982
Campbellsport	0	
Kettle Moraine Lutheran	0	
Sheboygan Falls	0	
Watertown	0	
Waupun	0	
Weyauwega	0	
