= Mid-Eastern Conference (Wisconsin) =

Wisconsin high school athletic conference (1952-1970)

The Mid-Eastern Conference is a former high school athletic conference in Wisconsin, in operation from 1952 to 1970. Its membership was concentrated in northeastern Wisconsin, and all of its member schools belonged to the Wisconsin Interscholastic Athletic Association.

== History ==
Location of Mid-Eastern Conference Members (1952–1968)

The Mid-Eastern Conference was formed in 1952 by a split of the Northeastern Wisconsin Conference, an athletic organization for medium-sized schools in the Fox River Valley region. All eight members of the established conference's Western Division (Clintonville, Kaukauna, Kimberly, Menasha, Neenah, New London, Shawano and Two Rivers) seceded to form the Mid-Eastern Conference, while the Eastern Division continued play as the NEW Conference. Membership was very stable over the course of the conference's history with all eight members competing together for sixteen years of the conference's eighteen-year life span. The only school to exit the conference was Neenah, who did so in 1968 to join with larger schools in the Fox River Valley Conference. The Mid-Eastern Conference was dissolved in 1970 as part of sweeping realignment in northeastern and east central Wisconsin. The three largest schools in the conference (Kaukauna, Kimberly and Menasha) joined with four schools from the Fox River Valley Conference (Appleton East, Appleton West, Neenah and Oshkosh) to form the Fox Valley Association. The other four schools, which were all smaller in enrollment, were dispersed to other area conferences based on geography and size. Clintonville became a charter member of the Bay Conference, New London joined the new East Central Conference, Shawano entered the Wisconsin Valley Conference and Two Rivers became part of a revamped Fox River Valley Conference.

== Conference membership history ==
=== Final members ===
| School | Location | Affiliation | Mascot | Colors | Joined | Left | Conference Joined | Current Conference |
|---|---|---|---|---|---|---|---|---|
| Clintonville | Clintonville, WI | Public | Truckers | | 1952 | 1970 | Bay | North Eastern |
| Kaukauna | Kaukauna, WI | Public | Galloping Ghosts | | 1952 | 1970 | Fox Valley Association | |
| Kimberly | Kimberly, WI | Public | Papermakers | | 1952 | 1970 | Fox Valley Association | |
| Menasha | Menasha, WI | Public | Blue Jays | | 1952 | 1970 | Fox Valley Association | Bay |
| New London | New London, WI | Public | Bulldogs | | 1952 | 1970 | East Central | Bay |
| Shawano | Shawano, WI | Public | Indians | | 1952 | 1970 | Wisconsin Valley | Bay |
| Two Rivers | Two Rivers, WI | Public | Raiders | | 1952 | 1970 | Fox River Valley | Eastern Wisconsin |

=== Previous members ===
| School | Location | Affiliation | Mascot | Colors | Joined | Left | Conference Joined | Current Conference |
|---|---|---|---|---|---|---|---|---|
| Neenah | Neenah, WI | Public | Rockets | | 1952 | 1968 | Fox River Valley | Fox Valley Association |

== List of state champions ==
=== Fall sports ===
Boys Cross Country
| School | Year | Division |
|---|---|---|
| Neenah | 1963 | Medium Schools |

Boys Volleyball
| School | Year | Division |
|---|---|---|
| Kaukauna | 1967 | Single Division |
| Kaukauna | 1969 | Single Division |

=== Winter sports ===
Boys Basketball
| School | Year | Division |
|---|---|---|
| Menasha | 1953 | Single Division |
| Shawano | 1956 | Single Division |
| Shawano | 1957 | Single Division |

=== Spring sports ===
Baseball
| School | Year | Division |
|---|---|---|
| Kaukauna | 1953 | Single Division |

Boys Tennis
| School | Year | Division |
|---|---|---|
| Neenah | 1953 | Single Division |
| Neenah | 1957 | Single Division |
| Menasha | 1963 | Single Division |
| Menasha | 1964 | Single Division |
| Neenah | 1965 | Single Division |
| Menasha | 1966 | Single Division |

Boys Track & Field
| School | Year | Division |
|---|---|---|
| Kimberly | 1960 | Class B |

== List of conference champions ==
=== Boys Basketball ===
| School | Quantity | Years |
|---|---|---|
| Kimberly | 12 | 1954, 1955, 1956, 1959, 1960, 1962, 1963, 1964, 1965, 1966, 1969, 1970 |
| Menasha | 4 | 1953, 1954, 1964, 1965 |
| Neenah | 3 | 1961, 1967, 1968 |
| Shawano | 2 | 1953, 1958 |
| Two Rivers | 1 | 1957 |
| Clintonville | 0 | |
| Kaukauna | 0 | |
| New London | 0 | |

=== Football ===
| School | Quantity | Years |
|---|---|---|
| Neenah | 11 | 1952, 1954, 1956, 1957, 1959, 1962, 1963, 1964, 1965, 1966, 1967 |
| Menasha | 3 | 1952, 1953, 1958 |
| Kaukauna | 2 | 1960, 1961 |
| Kimberly | 2 | 1955, 1969 |
| Clintonville | 1 | 1959 |
| Two Rivers | 1 | 1968 |
| New London | 0 | |
| Shawano | 0 | |
