= Hortonville High School =

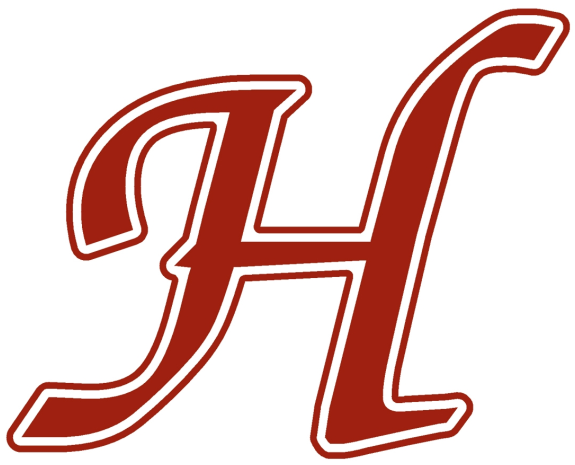

Location
- 155 Warner Street; Hortonville, Wisconsin 54942; United States; 44°20′14″N 88°38′02″W

Information
- Type: Public, Coeducational
- School district: Hortonville Area School District
- Superintendent: Todd Timm
- Principal: Tim Rietveld
- Teaching staff: 72.38 (on an FTE basis)
- Grades: 9-12
- Enrollment: 1,332 (2023–2024)
- Student to teacher ratio: 18.40
- Colors: Red & white
- Song: Washington & Lee
- Athletics: WIAA District 1
- Athletics conference: Fox Valley Association / Valley Football Association
- Mascot: "Polie" the Polar Bear
- Nickname: Polar Bears
- Accreditation: North Central Association of Colleges and Schools
- Newspaper: Bear Facts
- Yearbook: Polar Bear
- Website: Hortonville High School
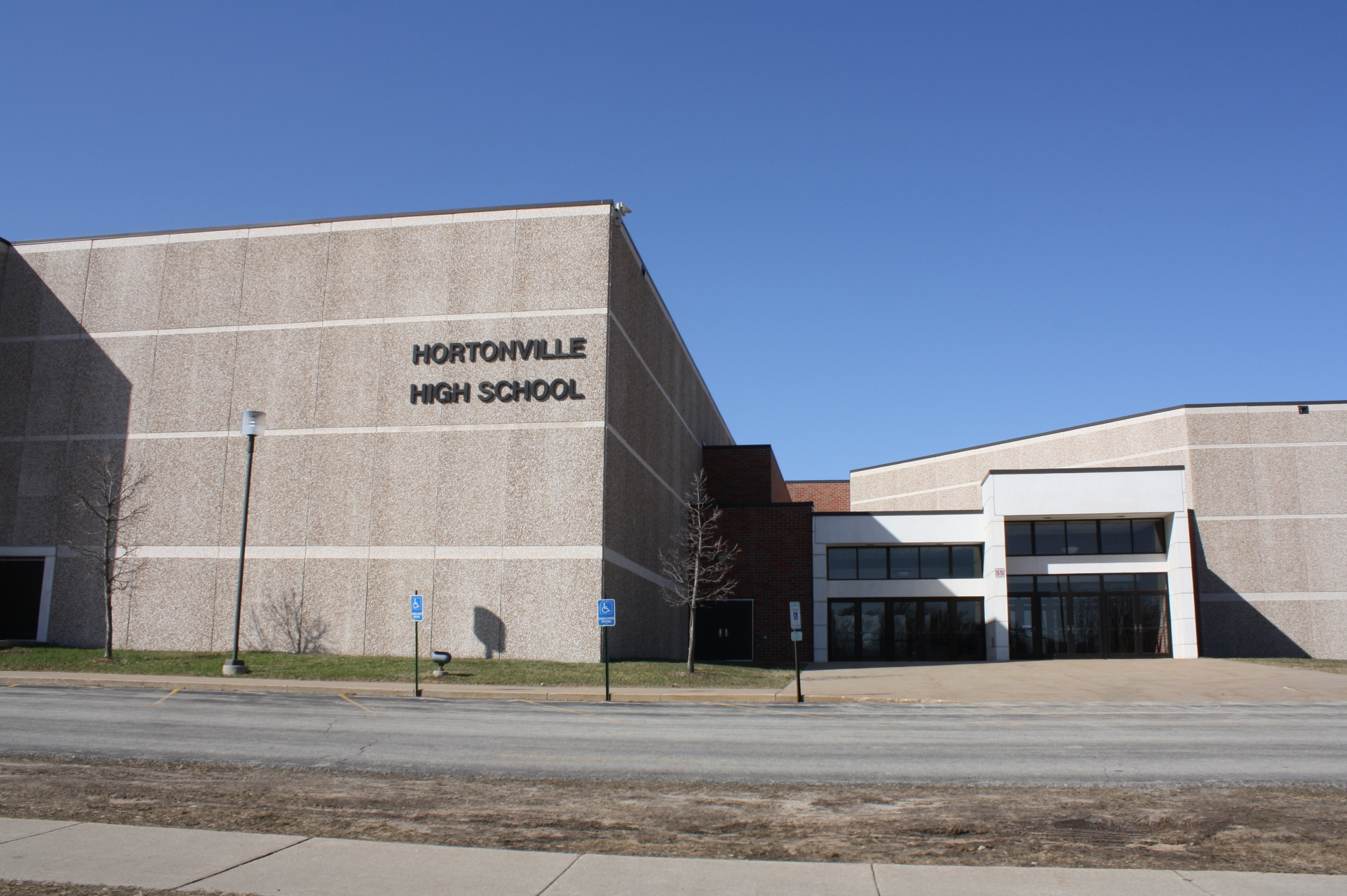

Hortonville High School is a high school in Hortonville, Wisconsin. The only high school in the Hortonville Area School District, it serves students in grades 9 to 12 from the communities of Hortonville and Greenville, and portions of Center, Dale, Ellington, Grand Chute, Hortonia, and Liberty.

== Campus ==
Hortonville High School is on a 37.5-acre campus bounded by Warner Street, Olk Street, Nash Street, and Towne Drive on the east side of the Village of Hortonville. In addition to academic areas, the building includes the school district administration offices, an 800-seat performing arts center, a field house and auxiliary gymnasium, a fitness center open to district residents, a branch of Wolf River Community Bank, and a cafeteria and commons area.

The 3,000-seat Wolf River Community Bank Stadium at Akin Field is at the northeast corner of the campus and is home to the football, soccer, and track teams. Off-campus athletic facilities include Commercial Club Park (varsity baseball), Otto Miller Athletic Complex (softball, freshman and junior varsity baseball, and soccer), Greenville Community Park (baseball and softball), Greenville Lions Park (cross country), Grandview Golf Club (golf) and Community First Champion Center (hockey).

== History ==
Construction of the first high school building in Hortonville began in 1899 near the corner of Pine and Cedar Streets, with the first classes offered in 1902. In 1906, Hortonville graduated its first senior class, which had 17 students. During this time, athletic events were held at the Hortonville Community Hall and Opera House, where due to the temperature of the facility, the teams earned the nickname "Polar Bears".

In 1953, the Hortonville Union High School District was formed, consolidating the existing school with the surrounding rural school districts. The high school moved to its current location in 1956. In 1962, an addition to the building connected the high school to the elementary and middle schools to the north, the elementary and high school districts were combined, and the high school was renamed Hortonville High School. Major additions occurred in 1965, 1976, and 1984, during which time the building housed the entire district.

Since 1991, five elementary and middle school buildings have been constructed in the district, with the vacated space in the original building converted after extensive remodeling for high school use. In 1994, the field house and performing arts center additions were completed. In 2014, a cafeteria and commons area, new administrative offices, and extensive remodeling were completed. The school's football field was renovated in 2018.

=== 1974 teachers' strike ===
During the 1974 school year, teachers belonging to the Hortonville Education Association, a teachers' union, went on strike after months of contract negotiations with the school board. At the time, strikes by teachers were against state law. The strike received national attention as the 84 striking teachers were replaced by strikebreakers and classes resumed, an unprecedented move. Thousands of union activists convened in Hortonville to join the picket lines, which led to political unrest in the community. The case ultimately went to the Supreme Court of the United States. The union claimed that the Hortonville Board of Education'a disciplinary hearings were prejudiced because of the board's role as the bargaining unit for the district. In a 6–3 decision authored by Chief Justice Warren E. Burger, the court found the board had the power to discipline the teachers.

== Academics ==
A minimum of 24 credits are required for graduation, as well as 36 hours of community service. Courses are offered in art, business, computers, marketing, English, family and consumer science, health, mathematics, music, personal finance, physical education, science, social science, manufacturing engineering and technology, world languages, and yearbook production.

Seniors who want to develop job skills in an area related to post-high school career goals can enroll in School Supervised Work Experience.

Advanced Placement classes include biology, calculus, chemistry, computer science, English literature and composition, environmental science, human geography, psychology, physics, Spanish, studio art, U.S. governmental and politics, U.S. history, and world history.

Distance learning through the K-12 Schools/College Alliance for Distance Education (KSCADE) allows students to take courses during the school day from other locations by video network.

Hortonville High School students can take classes taught at the high school through Fox Valley Technical College and receive both high school and technical college credit.

The Youth Options program enables students to leave campus to take courses during their junior and senior years at either a university or a technical college.

== Extracurricular activities ==
=== Academic activities and clubs ===
Hortonville High School offers the following academic activities and clubs: anime club, archery club, art team, debate, diversity group, environmental club, FCCLA (Future Career & Community Leaders of America), forensics, GSA (The Gay-Straight Alliance), German, H.O.P.E. (Helping Our Peers Engage), link crew, math club, math team, National Honor Society, PAWS (Peers Assisting With Students), robotics team, rocket club, school play, ski club, Spanish, Spanish Honor Society, spirit club, student council, WIHA (Wisconsin Interscholastic Horsemanship Association), and yearbook.

Band offerings include: jazz ensemble, marching band, pep band, pit orchestra, solo/ensemble and color guard/winter guard.

Choral offerings include: male choir, musical, a capella, show choir, solo/ensemble, and vocal jazz.

=== Athletics ===
Hortonville High School competes in Division 1 of the Wisconsin Interscholastic Athletic Association and is a member of the Fox Valley Association. The school offers baseball, basketball (boys and girls), cheer leading, cross country, dance, football, golf (boys and girls), soccer (boys and girls), softball, track and field, volleyball (boys and girls), and wrestling.

Hockey is offered to both boys and girls through cooperative teams with nearby high schools. Boys may join the Neenah-Hortonville-Menasha Rockets, which is fielded in conjunction with Neenah and Menasha high schools. Girls may join the Fox Cities Stars, which is fielded in conjunction with Freedom, Fox Valley Lutheran, Kaukauna, Kimberly, Little Chute, Neenah, New London, St. Mary Central, and Xavier high schools.

The Polar Bears have made 15 state tournament appearances: eight times for spring baseball, once for girls' basketball, and five times for softball. The baseball team won the state title in 1987, 1997, and 1998, with the softball team winning the title in 1996 and 2000.

Growth in enrollment at HHS has prompted several athletic conference changes over the years. Conferences the school has been a part of include the: Little Nine Conference (1928-1970), East Central Conference (1970-1999), Valley 8 Conference (1999-2007), Bay Conference (2007-2014), and Fox Valley Association/Valley Football Association (2014–Present).

== Feeder schools ==
Students entering HHS typically come from the district's three public middle schools—Fox West Academy, Greenville Middle School, and Hortonville Middle School—and from the district's three private schools: Bethlehem Lutheran, Immanuel Lutheran, and St. Mary of the Immaculate Conception Catholic.

== Recognition ==
- HHS has been a National Association for Sport and Physical Education STAR School since 2005.
- In 2009, HHS was one of only three high schools in the state to receive Gold Status in the Governor's School Health Award Initiative. The awards are given to schools in recognition of their effort to develop programs, policies and resources that support students' academic achievement and long-term physical health.
- In 2009, HHS was the third school in the nation recognized as a StormReady Supporter.
- HHS was featured on an episode of the MTV reality series Made, which aired on June 14, 2008.

== Notable alumni ==
- Lowell Bennett, racing driver
- Caleb Boushley, baseball player
- Jason Bergmann (strongman)
