= Cole Konrad =

American wrestler and mixed martial artist (born 1984)

- Born: April 2, 1984 (age 42); Appleton, Wisconsin, U.S.
- Other names: The Polar Bear
- Height: 6 ft 5 in (1.96 m)
- Weight: 265 lb (120 kg; 18 st 13 lb)
- Division: Heavyweight (265 lb)
- Stance: Orthodox
- Fighting out of: Neenah, Wisconsin, U.S.
- Team: Team DeathClutch / Minnesota Martial Arts Academy
- Trainer: Marty Morgan
- Wrestling: NCAA Division I Wrestling
- Years active: 2010–2012

Mixed martial arts record
- Total: 9
- Wins: 9
- By knockout: 1
- By submission: 3
- By decision: 5
- Losses: 0

Other information
- University: University of Minnesota
- Notable schools: Freedom High School (Wisconsin); New London High School (Wisconsin)
- Mixed martial arts record from Sherdog
Medal record
Representing the United States
Men's freestyle wrestling
Pan American Championships
Gold medal – first place	2005 Guatemala City	120 kg
World University Championships
Bronze medal – third place	2006 Ulaanbaatar	120 kg
Men's collegiate wrestling
Representing the Minnesota Golden Gophers
NCAA Division I Championships
Gold medal – first place	2006 Oklahoma City	285 lb
Gold medal – first place	2007 Auburn Hills	285 lb
Silver medal – second place	2005 St. Louis	285 lb
Big Ten Championships
Gold medal – first place	2005 Iowa City	285 lb
Gold medal – first place	2006 Bloomington	285 lb
Gold medal – first place	2007 East Lansing	285 lb

Cole Konrad (born April 2, 1984) is an American retired mixed martial arts fighter. Konrad won a gold medal at the 2005 Pan-American Championships. He won the NCAA wrestling championships in 2006 and 2007 at 285 pounds and finished third at the 2006 World University Championships at 120 kilograms. He was the first Bellator Heavyweight World Champion.

== Amateur wrestling career ==
=== High school ===
After transferring from New London High School in New London, Wisconsin to Freedom High School in Freedom, Wisconsin. Konrad compiled a 101–15 record and won the 2002 Wisconsin state championship. He was listed as a first team high school All-American at 275 pounds by both the Amateur Wrestling News and Wrestling USA Magazine. During his high school career, Konrad also excelled at freestyle and Greco-Roman wrestling. He won the 2002 Junior National Championships in both styles.

=== Collegiate ===
Konrad wrestled at the University of Minnesota where he won two NCAA titles. The first came during an undefeated junior season of 2006 and he followed that up with another undefeated, title winning performance in 2007. His overall collegiate record finished at 155–13, with 10 of those losses coming during his freshman season.

Konrad gained notoriety in wrestling through his rivalry with Steve Mocco. Mocco is a two time NCAA champion for Oklahoma State and Iowa. As Mocco attempted to win his third NCAA title during the 2006 season, Konrad beat Mocco a total of three times including a pin at the National Duals and a 5–2 victory in the NCAA title match. Konrad is the all-time Minnesota record holder for consecutive wins with 76. He recorded a pin in his final collegiate match over Penn State wrestler Aaron Anspach.

=== International ===
While concentrating on collegiate wrestling, Konrad has managed to develop a strong international record as well. In 2005 he won a gold medal at the Pan American Championships in Guatemala City, Guatemala and finished third at the U.S. World Team Trials. In 2006 he won the bronze medal for the 264.5 pounds freestyle weight class at the World University Championships in Ulaanbaatar, Mongolia.

== Mixed martial arts career ==
Konrad made his professional mixed martial arts debut on January 23, 2010, defeating Gary "Chief" Hamen on the Martial Arts Xtreme promotion's Max Fights 8 with a neck crank, which is a modified rear naked choke from half guard that his training partner, Brock Lesnar, nicknamed the "Polar Bear Choke". His second professional fight was a TKO in the first round over Joel Wyatt.

=== Bellator Fighting Championships ===
Konrad made his Bellator debut May 6, 2010 at Bellator 17, where he won a unanimous decision against Pat Bennett. He went on to win his next three fights by unanimous decision: Bellator 22 against John Orr, Bellator 25 against Rogent Lloret in the Bellator Season Three Heavyweight tournament quarter-final, and at Bellator 29 against Damian Grabowski in the Bellator Season Three Heavyweight tournament semi-final. Konrad won the Heavyweight tournament final and became the first Bellator heavyweight champion at Bellator 32 with an Americana submission in round 1 against Neil Grove.
In 2011 Konrad won a non-title decision over Paul Buentello. This fight surprised most observers, as it was contested entirely standing, unlike most Konrad matches. More than 18 months after winning the title, Konrad finally had his first official title defense, against Season Five Tournament Winner Eric Prindle, another opponent known primarily for his striking. This time, Konrad took the fight to the ground quickly and dispatched Prindle within a minute. According to his coach, Greg Nelson, Konrad trained for a single day to prepare for this fight.

Konrad retired from MMA competition on September 12, 2012 to become a full-time commodities broker.

== Championships and accomplishments ==
=== Mixed martial arts ===
- Bellator Fighting Championships
  - Bellator Heavyweight World Championship (One time; First)
  - One successful title defense
  - Bellator Season 3 Heavyweight Tournament Winner
- Fight Matrix
  - 2010 Male Rookie of the Year

=== Amateur wrestling ===
- International Federation of Associated Wrestling Styles
  - 2007 Sunkist Kids International Open Senior Greco-Roman Bronze Medalist
  - 2005 Pan American Championships Senior Freestyle Gold Medalist
- International University Sports Federation
  - 2006 FISU World University Championships Freestyle Bronze Medalist
- USA Wrestling
  - USA Senior Freestyle National Championship Runner-up (2007)
  - USA University Freestyle National Championship (2006)
  - USA University Folkstyle National Championship (2003)
  - USA Junior Freestyle National Championship (2002)
  - USA Junior Greco-Roman National Championship (2002)
  - ASICS Tiger High School All-American First Team (2002)
  - USA Junior Greco-Roman National Championship Runner-up (2001)
  - Northern Plains Junior Freestyle Regional Championship Runner-up (2001)
  - Northern Plains Junior Greco-Roman Regional Championship (2001)
  - 2004 South Regional Olympic Team Trials Qualifier Senior Greco-Roman Winner
  - 2003 FILA Junior Freestyle World Team Trials Winner
  - 2003 FILA Junior Greco-Roman World Team Trials Winner
- National Collegiate Athletic Association
  - NCAA Division I Collegiate National Championship (2006, 2007)
  - NCAA Division I Collegiate National Championship Runner-up (2005)
  - NCAA Division I All-American (2004, 2005, 2006, 2007)
  - Big Ten Conference Championship (2005, 2006, 2007)
  - Big Ten Jesse Owens Male Athlete of the Year (2007)
- Wisconsin Interscholastic Athletic Association
  - WIAA Division II High School State Championship (2002)
  - WIAA Division II All-State (2002)
  - Valley 8 Conference Championship (2002)
  - WIAA Division I All-State (2001)

== Mixed martial arts record ==
Professional record breakdown
9 matches	9 wins	0 losses
By knockout	1	0
By submission	3	0
By decision	5	0

Res.	Record	Opponent	Method	Event	Date	Round	Time	Location	Notes
Win	9–0	Eric Prindle	Submission (kimura)	Bellator 70	May 25, 2012	1	1:00	New Orleans, Louisiana, United States	Defended the Bellator Heavyweight World Championship. Later vacated title when Konrad retired from MMA.
Win	8–0	Paul Buentello	Decision (unanimous)	Bellator 48	August 20, 2011	3	5:00	Uncasville, Connecticut, United States	Non-title bout.
Win	7–0	Neil Grove	Submission (keylock)	Bellator 32	October 14, 2010	1	4:45	Kansas City, Missouri, United States	Bellator Season 3 Heavyweight Tournament Final. Won the inaugural Bellator Heavyweight World Championship.
Win	6–0	Damian Grabowski	Decision (unanimous)	Bellator 29	September 16, 2010	3	5:00	Milwaukee, Wisconsin, United States	Bellator Season 3 Heavyweight Tournament Semifinal.
Win	5–0	Rogent Lloret	Decision (unanimous)	Bellator 25	August 19, 2010	3	5:00	Chicago, Illinois, United States	Bellator Season 3 Heavyweight Tournament Quarterfinal.
Win	4–0	John Orr	Decision (unanimous)	Bellator 22	June 17, 2010	3	5:00	Kansas City, Missouri, United States	
Win	3–0	Pat Bennett	Decision (unanimous)	Bellator 17	May 6, 2010	3	5:00	Boston, Massachusetts, United States	
Win	2–0	Joel Wyatt	TKO (punches)	Matrix Fights 1	February 27, 2010	1	2:23	Philadelphia, Pennsylvania, United States	
Win	1–0	Gary Hamen	Submission (neck crank)	Max Fights 8: Elimination	January 23, 2010	1	1:13	Fargo, North Dakota, United States	

== See also ==
- List of Bellator MMA alumni
- List of undefeated mixed martial artists
- List of male mixed martial artists
- Minnesota Golden Gophers wrestling
