= Kewaskum High School =

Location
- 1540 Bilgo Lane; Kewaskum, (Washington County), Wisconsin 53040-0426; United States; 43.5247°N 88.2244°W

Information
- Established: 1955
- School district: Kewaskum School District
- Principal: Kevin Bryant
- Faculty: 37.07 (FTE)
- Grades: 9–12
- Enrollment: 594 (2023-2024)
- Student to teacher ratio: 16.02
- Colors: Forest Green and White
- Athletics conference: East Central Conference
- Nickname: Indians
- Assistant Principal: Mark Bingham
- Athletic Director: Jason Pittmann
- Website: www.kewaskumschools.org

Kewaskum High School is located in Kewaskum, Wisconsin, United States and is the lone high school in the Kewaskum School District. Kewaskum High School's instruction includes grades 9-12. As of the 2022-2023 school year, the student population is 571. The high school offers 12 Advanced Placement courses as well as numerous courses that offer technical college credits.

== Extracurricular activities and athletics ==
Kewaskum HS offers a wide variety of activities, clubs, and sports. Kewaskum High School is also a member of the WIAA for sports such as football, boys' and girls' basketball, girls' volleyball, boys' and girls' golf, cross country, summer baseball, wrestling, track and field, boys' and girls' soccer, softball boys' and girls' bowling, girls' hockey, and boys' and girls' tennis. Other clubs and activities include but are not limited to chess club, Key club, Spanish club, cribbage club, mock trial, National Honor Society, band, choir, show choir, drama, theater, musical, and more. Kewaskum is a member of the East Central Conference and is predominately known for football. Since the new conference began in 2015, Kewaskum has been back to back conference champions in 2015 and tri-conference champions in 2016 along with the Berlin High School and Plymouth High School. Kewaskum football was previously dominant in the old conference, the Eastern Wisconsin Conference. From 2005 to 2017 the Indians made the WIAA Division III playoffs 13 consecutive seasons, including once going to the Level 4 playoff game against Waupaca High School in 2008.

KHS won a state championship in boys' cross country in 1961 and a girls’ basketball state championship in 2023.

== Conference history and rivalries ==
Being in the newly made East Central Conference created in 2015, Kewaskum High School has since held multiple conference records within the East Central Conference. Prior to that, Kewaskum was members of the Eastern Wisconsin Conference from 1980 to 2015, the Scenic Moraine Conference from 1958 to 1980 and the Fox Valley Tri-County League from 1924 to 1958.

Rivalries against Campbellsport High School and Plymouth High School has persisted since the old Eastern Wisconsin Conference. Every year, the Campbellsport Cougars and Kewaskum Indians battle for the "Kettle Moraine Bowl" during the football season. The winner of the game is presented with the trophy and is currently with Kewaskum from the 2016 season.
