= Valley 8 Conference =

Wisconsin high school athletic conference (1999-2007)

The Valley 8 Conference is a former high school athletic conference comprising eight members in east central Wisconsin. The conference was in existence from 1999 to 2007, and all members belonged to the Wisconsin Interscholastic Athletic Association.

== History ==
Location of Valley 8 Conference Members

The Valley 8 Conference was formed in 1999 by eight medium-sized high schools in the Fox River Valley region in Wisconsin: Clintonville, Fox Valley Lutheran, Freedom, Hortonville, Little Chute, Oconto Falls, Waupaca and Xavier. Three of the six public school members (Hortonville, Little Chute and Waupaca) were formerly in the East Central Conference, and one each came from the Bay (Clintonville), Olympian (Freedom) and Packerland (Oconto Falls) Conferences. The two private schools (Fox Valley Lutheran and Xavier of Appleton) were both previously in the Fox Valley Christian Conference, and were in the process of joining the WIAA as part of its merger with the Wisconsin Independent Schools Athletic Association. Membership remained stable for the entirety of the conference's history, which ended in 2007 when the Valley 8 was disbanded. Six schools (Clintonville, Fox Valley Lutheran, Freedom, Little Chute, Waupaca and Xavier) became charter members of the Eastern Valley Conference, and the two other members (Hortonville and Oconto Falls) joined the Bay Conference.

== Conference membership history ==
School	Location	Affiliation	Mascot	Colors	Joined	Left	Conference Joined	Current Conference
Clintonville	Clintonville, WI	Public	Truckers		1999	2007	Eastern Valley	North Eastern
Fox Valley Lutheran	Appleton, WI	Private (Lutheran, WELS)	Foxes		1999	2007	Eastern Valley	Bay
Freedom	Freedom, WI	Public	Irish		1999	2007	Eastern Valley	North Eastern
Hortonville	Hortonville, WI	Public	Polar Bears		1999	2007	Bay	Fox Valley Association
Little Chute	Little Chute, WI	Public	Mustangs		1999	2007	Eastern Valley	North Eastern
Oconto Falls	Oconto Falls, WI	Public	Panthers		1999	2007	Bay	North Eastern
Waupaca	Waupaca, WI	Public	Comets		1999	2007	Eastern Valley	North Eastern
Xavier	Appleton, WI	Private (Catholic)	Hawks		1999	2007	Eastern Valley	Bay

== List of state champions ==
=== Fall sports ===
Girls Cross Country
School	Year	Division
Oconto Falls	1999	Division 2

Football
School	Year	Division
Fox Valley Lutheran	2001	Division 3
Waupaca	2006	Division 3

Boys Soccer
School	Year	Division
Xavier	2003	Division 2
Xavier	2004	Division 2
Xavier	2006	Division 2

=== Winter sports ===
None

=== Spring sports ===
Boys Golf
School	Year	Division
Xavier	2001	Division 2

Girls Soccer
School	Year	Division
Xavier	2004	Division 3
Xavier	2005	Division 2

Softball
School	Year	Division
Hortonville	2000	Division 2

== List of conference champions ==
=== Boys Basketball ===
School	Quantity	Years
Fox Valley Lutheran	2	2004, 2005
Little Chute	2	2002, 2006
Waupaca	2	2000, 2007
Xavier	2	2003, 2006
Clintonville	1	2001
Freedom	0	
Hortonville	0	
Oconto Falls	0	

=== Girls Basketball ===
School	Quantity	Years
Fox Valley Lutheran	6	2000, 2001, 2003, 2004, 2005, 2007
Hortonville	2	2004, 2006
Oconto Falls	1	2002
Clintonville	0	
Freedom	0	
Little Chute	0	
Waupaca	0	
Xavier	0	

=== Football ===
School	Quantity	Years
Waupaca	5	1999, 2001, 2002, 2003, 2006
Xavier	3	2002, 2004, 2005
Clintonville	1	2000
Fox Valley Lutheran	1	2000
Freedom	1	2002
Little Chute	1	2002
Hortonville	0	
Oconto Falls	0	
