= Sandy Cohen (basketball) =

American-Israeli basketball player

Sandy Cohen סנדי כהן
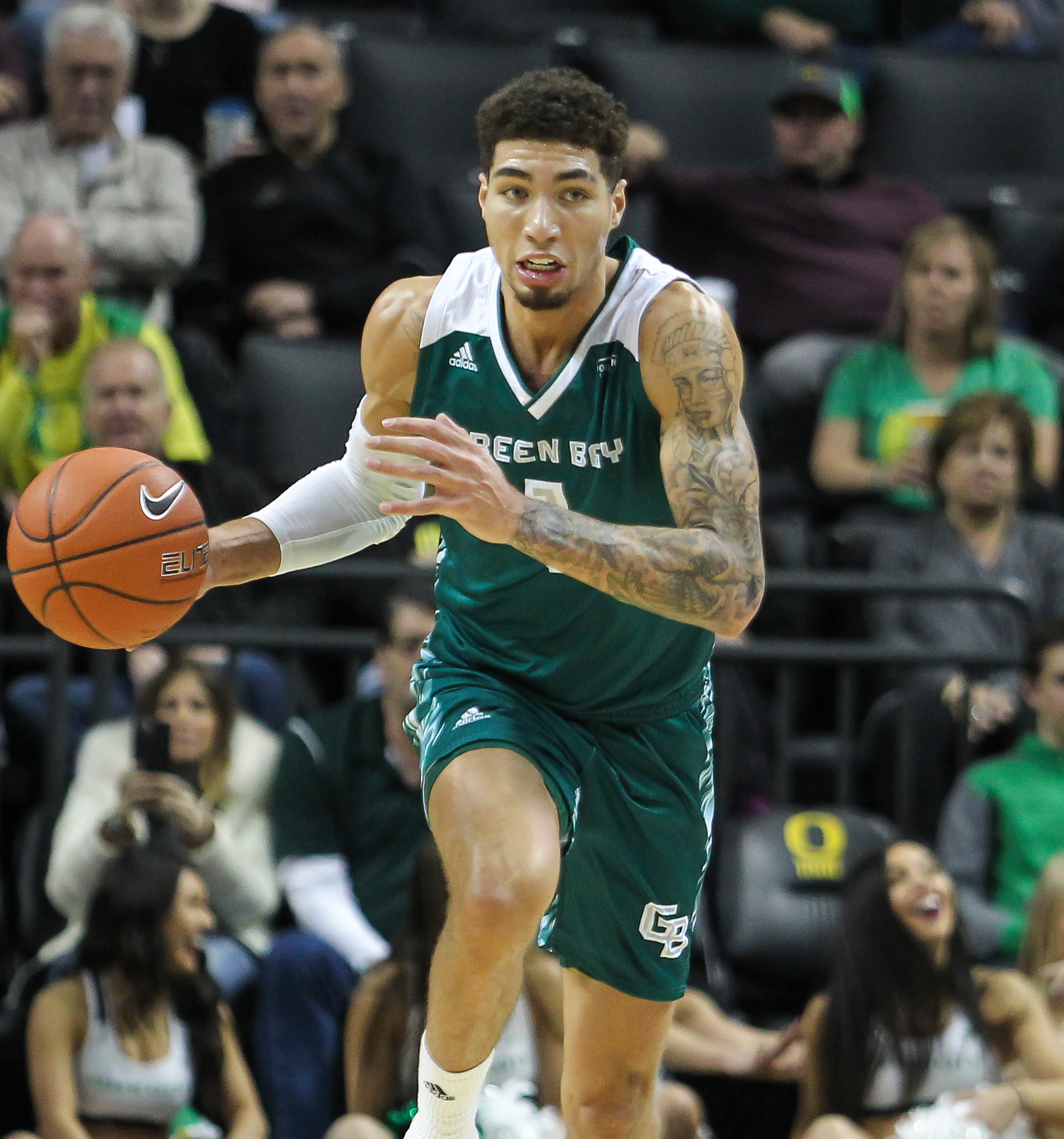

No. 5 – Maccabi Haifa
- Position: Shooting guard / small forward
- League: Liga Leumit

Personal information
- Born: September 22, 1995 (age 31) Green Bay, Wisconsin, U.S.
- Listed height: 6 ft 6 in (1.98 m)
- Listed weight: 200 lb (91 kg)

Career information
- High school: Seymour (Seymour, Wisconsin)
- College: Marquette (2014–2016); Green Bay (2017–2019)
- NBA draft: 2019: undrafted
- Playing career: 2019–present

Career history
- 2019–2022: Maccabi Tel Aviv
- 2021–2022: →Bnei Herzliya
- 2022–2024: Bnei Herzliya
- 2024–2025: Hapoel Afula
- 2025: Hapoel Tel Aviv
- 2026–present: Maccabi Haifa

Career highlights
- Israeli League champion (2020, 2021); First-team All-Horizon League (2019)

Sandy Cohen III (Hebrew: סנדי כהן; born September 22, 1995) is an American-Israeli professional basketball player for Maccabi Haifa of the Liga Leumit. A standout at Seymour Community High School, he led the team to two Bay Conference championships, and played college basketball for Marquette University and later the University of Wisconsin–Green Bay. Cohen went undrafted in the 2019 NBA draft, and signed a four-year contract with Maccabi Tel Aviv.

== Early life and high school career ==
Cohen was born in Green Bay, Wisconsin, U.S. to Linda King and Sandy Cohen, Jr. Cohen's family are members of the Oneida Nation of Wisconsin, and he is of Jewish descent through his father. Cohen has 3 siblings, including Minnesota Lynx player Natisha Hiedeman.

He attended Seymour Community High School, winning two Bay Conference championships in 2012 and 2014, and receiving First Team All-Conference honors twice. Cohen led the Bay in points per game his senior year, and was named Bay Conference Player of the Year. Cohen also received an All-State Honorable Mention from the Wisconsin Basketball Coaches Association his junior year. After his senior season, Cohen ranked as a top-100 consensus recruit (83rd by ESPN, 87th by Scout.com, and 97th by Rivals.com).

== College career ==
=== Marquette (2014–2017) ===
Cohen enrolled at Marquette University for the 2014–2015 season, coming mostly off the bench. His career highs his freshman season were 12 points, six rebounds, and 31 minutes. His sophomore season, Cohen set career records of 24 points, eight assists, and 36 minutes. Citing a desire to play more and have a larger role on the team, Cohen requested to be released from his scholarship at Marquette in November 2016 after playing three games of his junior season. He subsequently announced he would be transferring to Green Bay.

=== Green Bay (2017–2019) ===
Due to NCAA transfer rules, Cohen was to sit out the 2016–17 season and would have had only one year of eligibility remaining. In October 2017, Cohen was granted an NCAA waiver, which provided an extra year of eligibility. Cohen's first appearance with Green Bay was on December 21, 2017 against Bowling Green State University, scoring 16 points and grabbing six rebounds. His redshirt junior season in 2017–18 saw Cohen increase his career high in points to 36, receive Horizon League Player of the Week honors for the week of February 22, and lead the Horizon League in steals (1.8 SPG) while ranking sixth in scoring with 17.1 points per game.

His redshirt senior season, Cohen led the Phoenix in all statistical categories, set Green Bay's single-season scoring record at 666 points, and received multiple awards and accolades from the Horizon League and beyond.

== Professional career ==
Cohen went undrafted in the 2019 NBA draft, and played for the Cleveland Cavaliers in the NBA Summer League, while also working out with the Minnesota Timberwolves and Indiana Pacers. On August 12, 2019, Cohen signed a four-year contract with Maccabi Tel Aviv of the Israeli Premier League.

On July 14, 2021, Cohen was loaned from Maccabi Tel Aviv to Bnei Herzliya, along with guard Dori Sahar. On July 8, 2022, he signed a 1+1 contract extension with Bnei Herzliya. Cohen played with Herzliya through the 2023-24 season, and later signed with Hapoel Afula for the 2024-25 season, where he played for one season before joining Hapoel Tel Aviv.

== Personal life ==
Due to his father's Jewish background, Cohen was naturalized as an Israeli citizen in May 2020.

== Career statistics ==
Legend
GP	Games played	GS	Games started	MPG	Minutes per game
FG%	Field goal percentage	3P%	3-point field goal percentage	FT%	Free throw percentage
RPG	Rebounds per game	APG	Assists per game	SPG	Steals per game
BPG	Blocks per game	PPG	Points per game	**Bold**	Career high

=== College ===
Year	Team	GP	GS	MPG	FG%	3P%	FT%	RPG	APG	SPG	BPG	PPG
2014–15	Marquette	31	7	15.0	.371	.333	.607	1.6	.8	.5	.2	3.8
2015–16	Marquette	32	15	23.3	.439	**.355**	.741	3.2	1.8	.8	.4	5.9
2016–17	Marquette	3	0	6.3	.000	.000	.000	1.0	.3	.0	.7	.0
2017–18	Green Bay	22	20	33.0	.474	.349	.709	5.7	2.5	1.5	.6	16.1
2018–19	Green Bay	**38**	**37**	**34.1**	**.475**	.337	**.773**	**6.4**	**4.7**	**1.9**	**1.1**	**17.5**
**Career**		126	80	25.8	.457	.343	.739	4.1	2.5	1.1	.6	10.5

Source: RealGM

== Awards and honors ==
=== High school ===
- 2× Bay Conference championship (2012, 2014)
- 2× Bay Conference First Team (2013, 2014)
- Bay Conference Second Team (2012)
- Bay Conference Player of the Year (boys basketball, 2014)
- All-State Honorable Mention, Wisconsin Basketball Coaches Association (2014)
- Consensus top-100 recruit

=== College ===
- 3× Horizon League Player of the Week (men's basketball)
- First Team All-Horizon League (2019)
- Green Bay Phoenix single-season record holder in points (666)
- CollegeInsider.com Postseason Tournament All-Tournament Team (2019)
- Hugh Durham Classic MVP
