= Seymour Community High School =

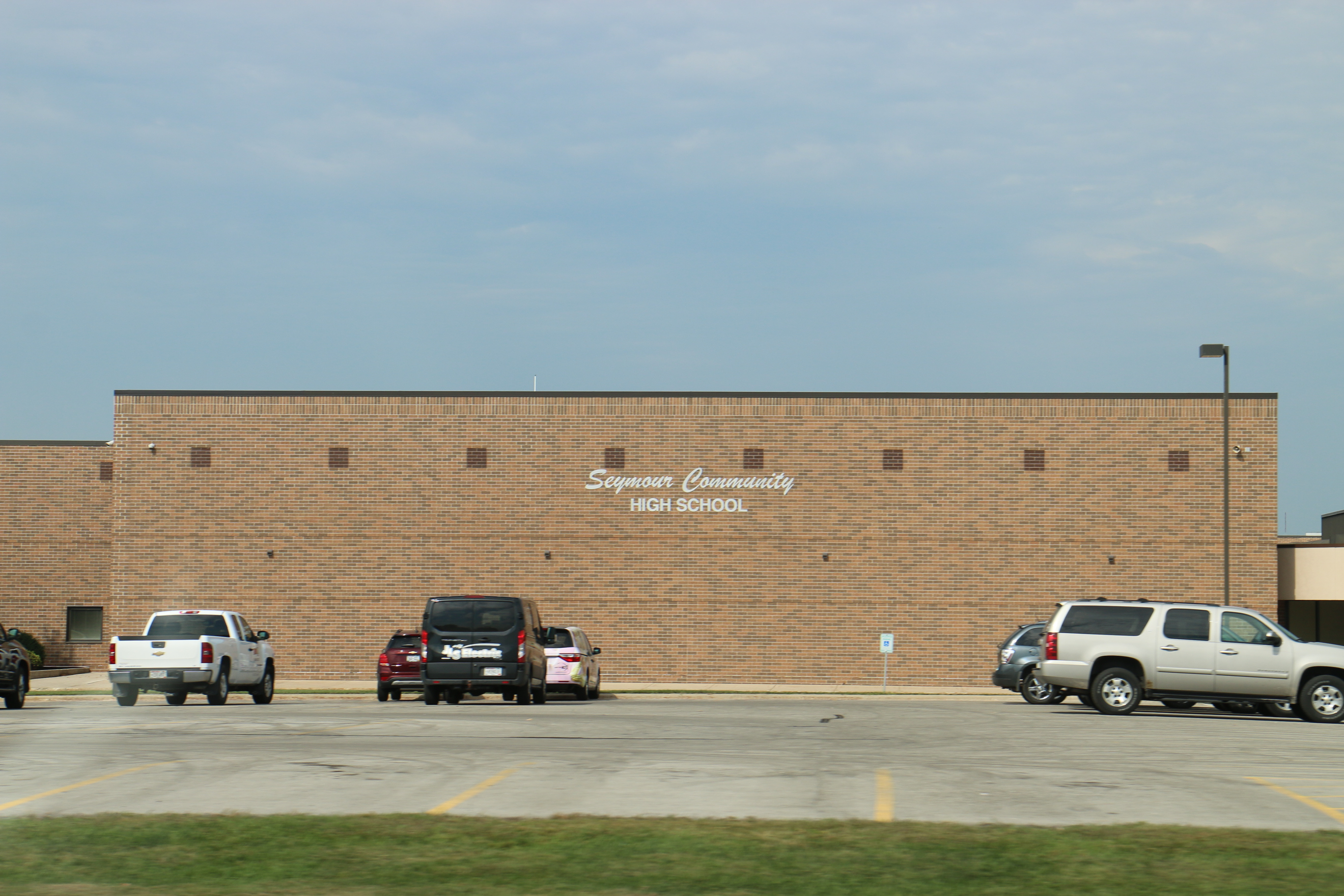
- Seymour Community High School in 2017

Location
- 10 Circle Drive; Seymour, Wisconsin; United States; 44.5020°N 88.3348°W

Information
- Type: Public
- Motto: "Welcome to Thunder Country" Pursuing Excellence, Embracing Challenge, Discovering Passion
- School district: Seymour Community
- Principal: Matt Molle
- Teaching staff: 40.55 (FTE)
- Grades: 9-12
- Gender: coed
- Enrollment: 595 (2023-2024)
- Student to teacher ratio: 14.67
- Colors: Red; White; Black
- Athletics conference: Bay Conference
- Nickname: Thunder
- Yearbook: Ripper
- Website: https://www.seymour.k12.wi.us/schools/high/

Seymour Community High School is a public high school in Seymour, Wisconsin administered by the Seymour Community School District. Its enrollment for the 2019–20 school year was 694. The school serves students from Seymour, Black Creek, Oneida, and surrounding areas.

== Extra-curricular activities ==
The football team won the state championship in Division 3 in 1985. The boys' basketball team advanced to the state Division 2 championship game from 2000 to 2007, winning the championship in 2001 and 2006. The team also won the championship in 1997.

=== Athletic conference affiliation history ===
- Little Nine Conference (1928-1950)
- Mid-Valley Conference (1946-1950)
- Northeastern Wisconsin Conference (1950-1970)
- Bay Conference (1970–present)

== Notable alumni ==
- Sandy Cohen (born 1995), American-Israeli basketball player in the Israeli Basketball Premier League
- Jon Dietzen (born 1996), American football player, University of Wisconsin, Green Bay Packers practice squad (NFL), Pittsburgh Maulers (United States Football League)
- Ty Majeski (born 1994), NASCAR driver
- Calahan Skogman (born 1993), actor, writer and college athlete
