= Wrightstown High School =

Coordinates: 44°19′02″N 88°09′17″W

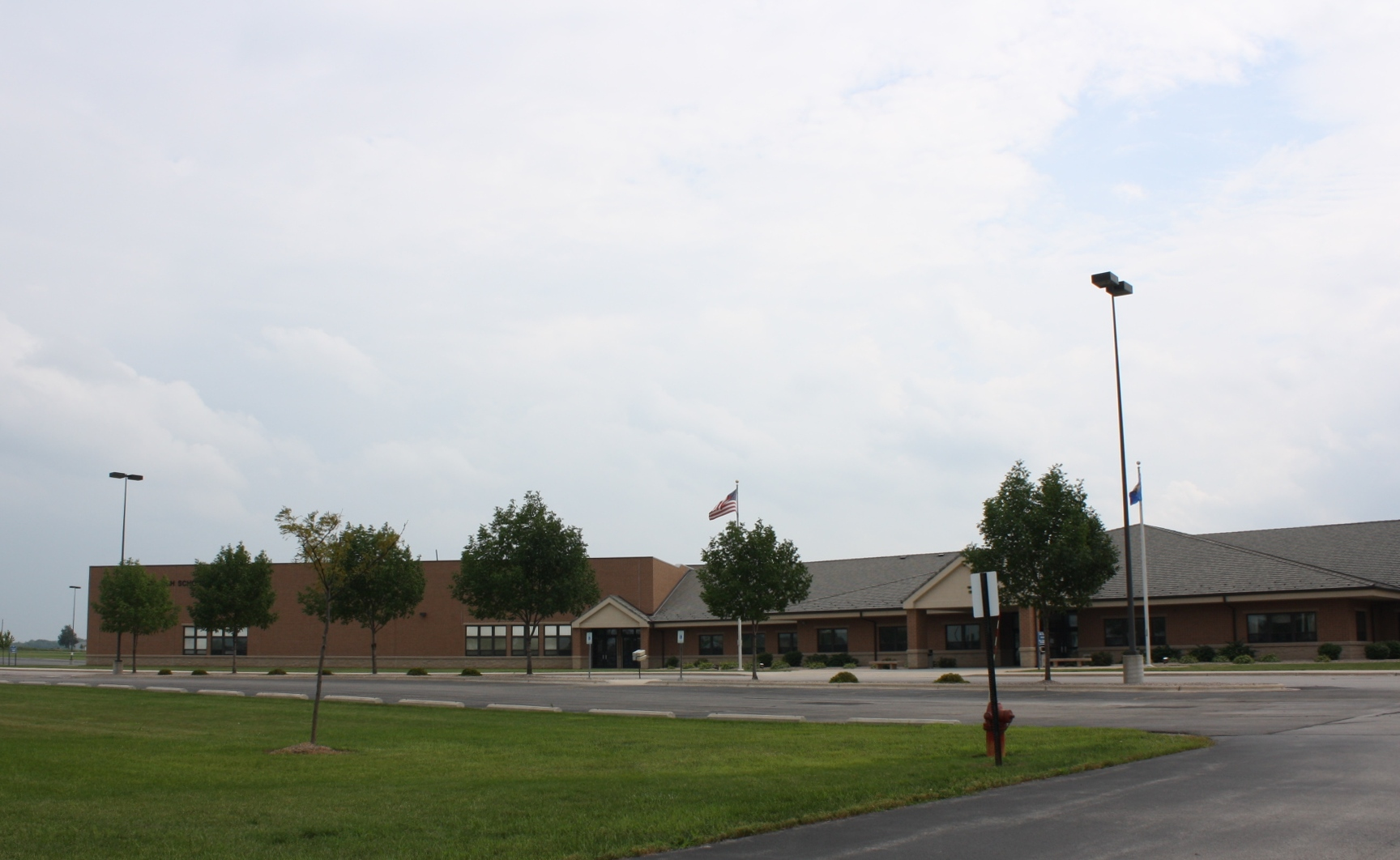

Location
- 600 High Street; Wrightstown, (Brown County), Wisconsin 54180; United States

Information
- Type: Public high school
- Principal: Scott Thompson
- Staff: 30.56 (FTE)
- Enrollment: 401 (2023-2024)
- Student to teacher ratio: 13.12
- Colors: Royal blue and white
- Fight song: "Across the Field"
- Athletics conference: North Eastern
- Nickname: Tigers

Wrightstown High School is a secondary education institution located in Wrightstown, Wisconsin. It has approximately 450 students and 27 full-time faculty. WHS falls under the authority of the Wrightstown Community School District. Its athletic teams are known as the Tigers, and play in the North Eastern Conference.

== Athletic conference affiliation history ==
- Little Nine Conference (1928-1970)
- Olympian Conference (1970-2015)
- North Eastern Conference (2015–present)
