= Denmark High School (Denmark, Wisconsin) =

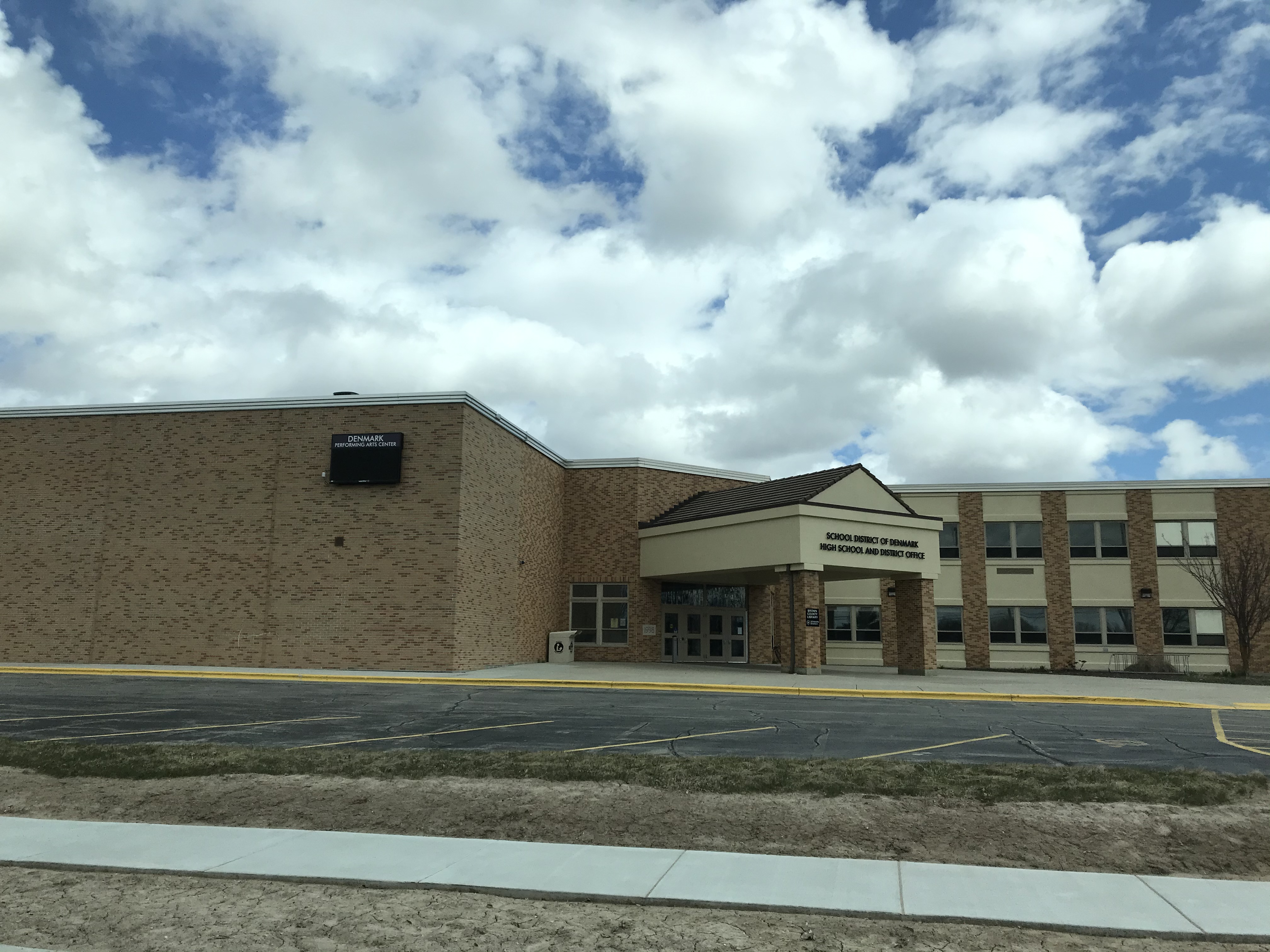
- Denmark High School in 2020

Location
- 450 N. Wall St. Denmark, Brown County, WI 54208; United States; 44.353937°N 87.824184°W

Information
- School type: Comprehensive public high school
- School district: Denmark School District
- NCES District ID: 5503660
- Superintendent: Luke Goral
- CEEB code: 500520
- NCES School ID: 550366000388
- Principal: Matt Parish
- Staff: 77
- Teaching staff: 30.87 (FTE)
- Grades: 9-12
- Enrollment: 465 (2023-2024)
- Student to teacher ratio: 15.06
- Classes offered: 129
- Language: English
- Hours in school day: 7.25
- Colors: Purple and gold
- Song: "On, Wisconsin!"
- Athletics conference: WIAA Northeastern Conference
- Mascot: Viking
- Nickname: Denmark Vikings
- Rival: Luxemburg-Casco Spartans
- Newspaper: Daily Denmark
- Website: www.denmark.k12.wi.us

Denmark High School is a public high school located in Denmark, Wisconsin, United States.

== Academics ==
In the spring of 2016, Denmark was named to the Advanced Placement honor roll for high schools for their offerings and increase in students passing.

== Demographics ==
Denmark is 90.8 percent white, 5.4 percent Hispanic, 1 percent other races, and 2.8 of students identify as a part of two or more races.

From 2000 to 2019, high school enrollment declined 13.6%.

Enrollment at Denmark High School, 2000–2019

== Athletics ==
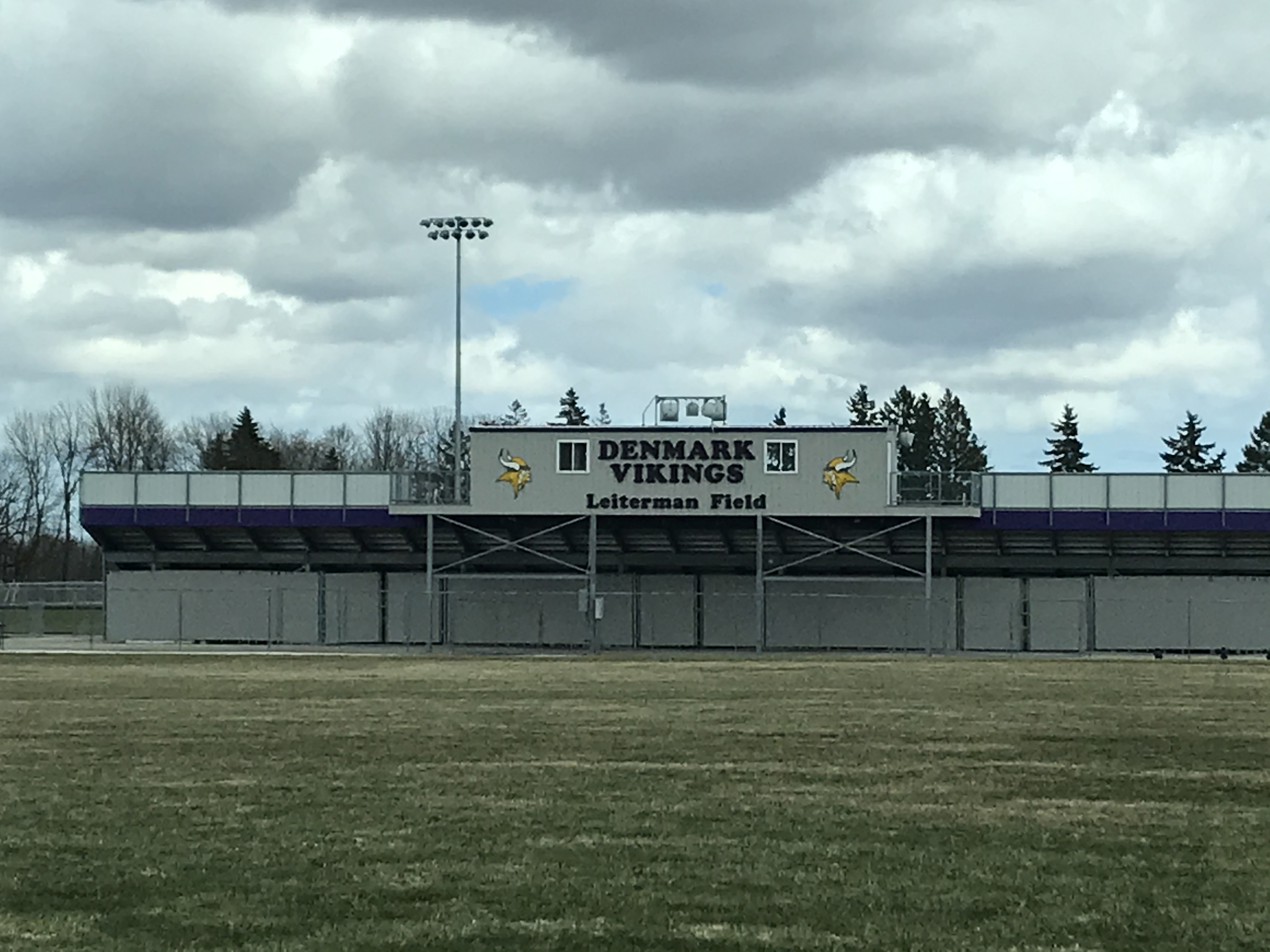
Leiterman Field, the school's football field

.

The school participates in Division 3 (formerly of Division 2) of the Wisconsin Interscholastic Athletic Association as a member of the Northeastern Conference (Wisconsin).

Denmark's trap shooting team won the 2018 and 2019 state championships. The Denmark boys' spring baseball team lost the D2 state final in 2005 against Kenosha St. Joseph in 12 innings. The team returned to the state finals in 2021 beating Jefferson 4-1 and also the following season in 2022, again beating Jefferson 6-5 to repeat as State Champions.

The boys' basketball team won the 1985 Division B state final. The team returned to state in 2019, but fell in the state semifinal to Waupun.

The softball team won state finals in 1982 (Division B), 1983 (Division B), 1991 (D2), and 1997 (D2).

=== Athletic conference affiliation history ===
- Little Nine Conference (1928-1970)
- Olympian Conference (1970-1999)
- Packerland Conference (1999-2007)
- Bay Conference (2007-2015)
- North Eastern Conference (2015–present)

== Extracurricular activities ==
Denmark High has been noted for a large agriculture presence, especially through FFA.

== Notable alumni ==
- Frank Joseph Dewane, former Bishop of Venice in Florida
