= Oconto Falls High School =

Public high school in Oconto Falls, Wisconsin, USA

Coordinates: 44.8732°N 88.1278°W

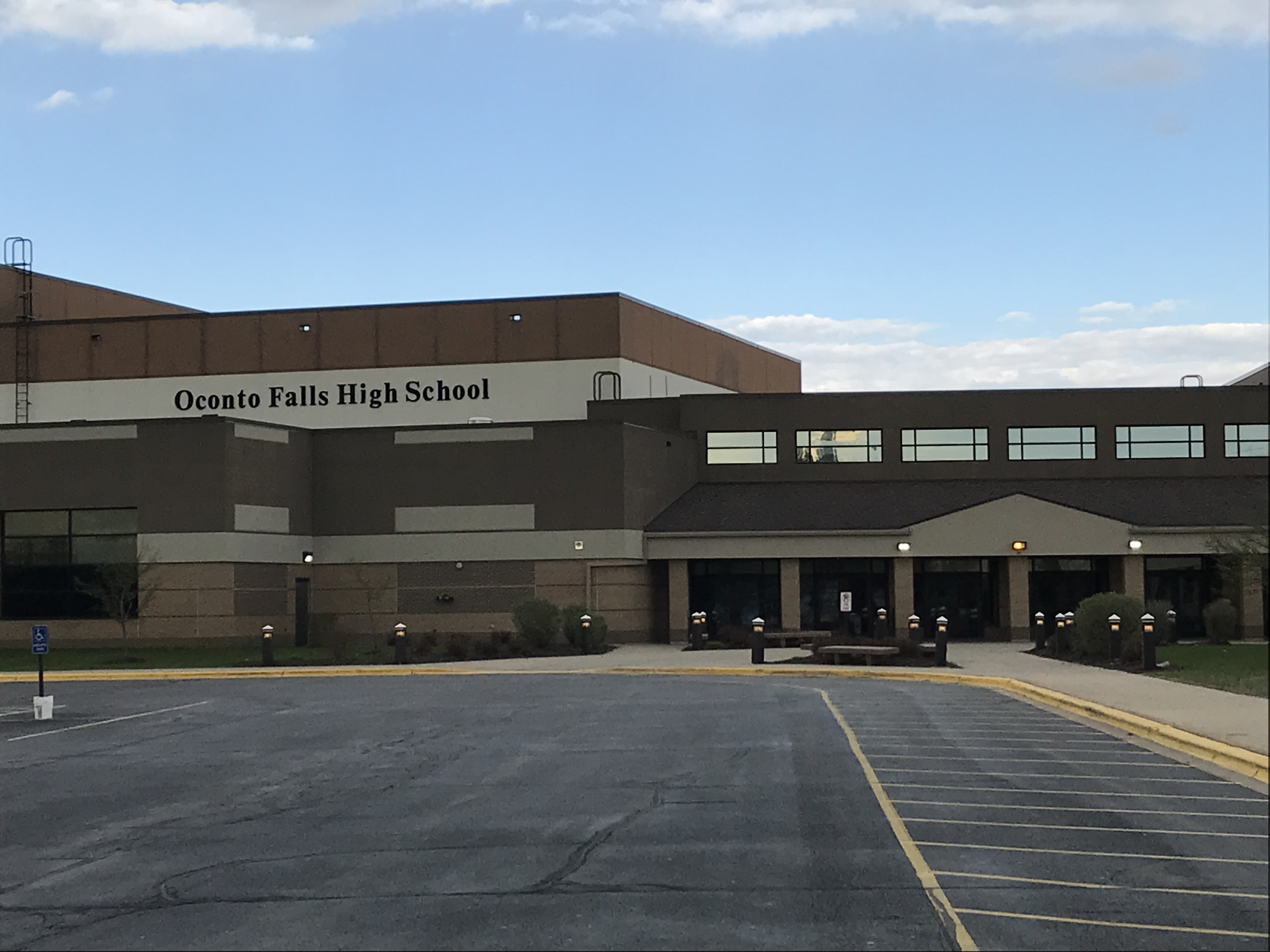

Location
- 210 N. Farm Road; Oconto Falls, Wisconsin 54154; United States

Information
- Type: Public secondary
- School district: Oconto Falls School District
- Principal: Daniel Moore
- Teaching staff: 35.90 (FTE)
- Grades: 9–12
- Enrollment: 534 (2023-2024)
- Student to teacher ratio: 14.87
- Colors: Orange and black
- Athletics conference: North Eastern Conference
- Mascot: Panther
- Nickname: Panthers
- Website: www.ofpanthers.com/schools/high

Oconto Falls High School is a public high school located in Oconto Falls, Wisconsin, United States. It is the only high school in the Oconto Falls School District, and had an enrollment of 506 for the 2016–2017 school year.

== History ==
In 1902, members of the Oconto Falls school board borrowed $10,000 from the state of Wisconsin to buy land for and build a high school, which was originally named "Washington". In 1915, a large addition was added on to accommodate the growing number of students. A spring 1957 fire destroyed most of the 1915 addition, but a new 25-classroom replacement was built by the fall. A 2001 fire damaged the roof of the school.

== Demographics ==
OFHS is 92 percent white, three percent Hispanic, three percent Native American, and two percent of students identify as a part of two or more races.

From 2000 to 2019, high school enrollment declined 24.4%.

Enrollment at Oconto Falls High School, 2000–2019

== Academics ==
Advanced Placement classes are offered at Oconto Falls. About a third of students take an AP test.

== Athletics ==
The Panthers baseball team won the Wisconsin Interscholastic Athletic Association championship in 1973 and 1978, the latter coming in Class B after the WIAA switched from one class to three for 1978. The football team won the Division III state title in 1997, and the girls' cross country team won the Division II championship in 1999. The Panthers wrestling team won the Division II team championship in 2010.

OFHS hosts the oldest track meet in Wisconsin, the Oconto Falls Invitational, each spring.

=== Athletic conference affiliation history ===
- Northeastern Wisconsin Conference (1927-1970)
- Bay Conference (1970-1979)
- Central Wisconsin Conference (1979-1984)
- Packerland Conference (1984-1999)
- Valley 8 Conference (1999-2007)
- Bay Conference (2007-2015)
- North Eastern Conference (2015–present)

== Performing arts ==
A community performing arts center, the Falls Area Performing Arts Center, is housed in OFHS. It is used by Oconto Falls students and other acts in the community.

== Notable alumni ==
- Bob Wickman (1987), baseball player, 2x MLB All-Star for the Milwaukee Brewers and Cleveland Indians
- Adam Peterson (1998), baseball player who played for the Toronto Blue Jays
- Ryan Spaude (2012), Wisconsin state legislator
