= Freedom High School (Wisconsin) =

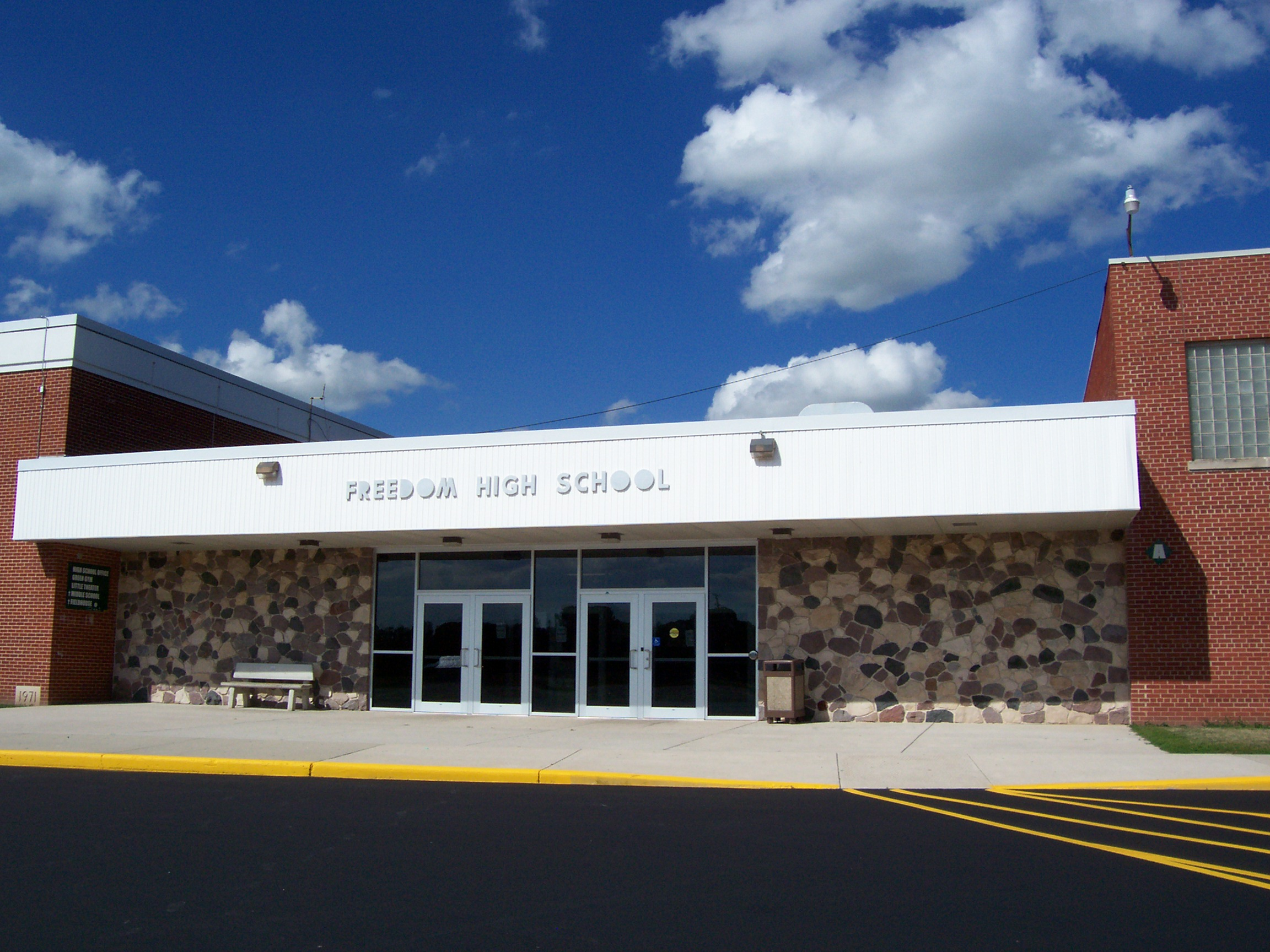
- Entrance

Location
- N4021 County Road E Freedom, Wisconsin 54130; United States
- Coordinates: 44.3841°N 88.2926°W

Information
- Other name: FHS
- Type: Public high school
- School district: Freedom Area School District
- NCES School ID: 550492000533
- Principal: Kurt Erickson
- Teaching staff: 36.64 (on an FTE basis)
- Grades: 9–12
- Enrollment: 481 (2023-2024)
- Student to teacher ratio: 13.13
- Colors: Green and Gold
- Athletics conference: North Eastern Conference
- Nickname: Irish
- Website: www.freedomschools.k12.wi.us/schools/highschool

Freedom High School (FHS) is a public high school in Freedom, Outagamie County, Wisconsin, United States. It is part of the Freedom Area School District.

== History ==
The first public school in Freedom began in 1863 in the home of early settler Nicholas July, and the first high school was built in 1905. That wooden building burned down in 1927 or 1928, and was replaced by a brick building.

With funding from the Works Progress Administration, a gymnasium was added in 1938, and other major additions were built in 1956 and 1972. Since 1972, voters have approved referendums to build more classrooms, a library, and a fieldhouse.

In November 2017, voters rejected a US$66.7 million school referendum to build a new high school. In January 2019, the school district proposed a reduced referendum for a US$55.7 million project, to be on the ballot on April 2, 2019.

== Curriculum ==
The school district has adopted Common Core State Standards in Language Arts, Disciplinary Literacy, and Math. Next Generation Science Standards are under implementation. According to the Wisconsin Department of Public Instruction, the school earned a four-star overall score, "Exceeds expectations", for "student achievement, student growth, educational equity, and preparing students for educational milestones, including college and career readiness".

== Athletics ==
Freedom's athletic teams are known as the Irish, and compete in the North Eastern Conference. The Irish have won 14 Wisconsin Interscholastic Athletic Association state championships.

State Championships
Year	Division	Sport
2024	2	Track and field (girls)
2022,2023	2	Softball
2021	2	Track and field (girls)
2020	1	Hockey (girls)*
2019	1	Hockey (girls)*
2019	2	Track and field (boys)
2019	2	Wrestling
2017	2	Cross Country (girls)
2016	2	Track and field (boys)
2015	2	Track and field (boys)
2015	2	Wrestling
1997	2	Wrestling
1990	B	Basketball (boys)
"*" denotes a co-op team championship.

=== Athletic conference affiliation history ===
- Little Nine Conference (1931-1970)
- Olympian Conference (1970-1999)
- Valley 8 Conference (1999-2007)
- Eastern Valley Conference (2007-2015)
- North Eastern Conference (2015–present)
