= Fox Valley Lutheran High School =

Private high school in Appleton, Wisconsin, United States

Location
- 5300 N. Meade Street; Appleton, Wisconsin 54913; United States; 44°18′59.88″N 88°23′40.49″W

Information
- Other names: FVLHS; FVL
- Type: Private high school
- Motto: For faith, values, and learning
- Religious affiliation: Lutheran
- Established: 1953
- Oversight: Wisconsin Evangelical Lutheran Synod
- NCES School ID: 01515493
- Principal: Alan Nolte
- Teaching staff: 39.1 (on an FTE basis)
- Grades: 9–12
- Gender: Co-educational
- Enrollment: 773 (2024–2025)
- Student to teacher ratio: 15.8
- Colors: Maroon and gray
- Athletics conference: Bay Conference
- Mascot: Rocky the Fox
- Nickname: Foxes
- Yearbook: Cross & Crown
- Website: www.fvlhs.org

Fox Valley Lutheran High School (FVLHS or FVL) is a private, Lutheran, co-educational high school in Appleton, Wisconsin, United States. It was established in 1953 and is owned by a federation of congregations of the Wisconsin Evangelical Lutheran Synod (WELS).

== History ==
In 1946, various Wisconsin Synod members in the Fox River Valley area began to discuss the possible creation of a "Valley Lutheran High School." When the school was founded in 1953, it began classes with only eight students and one full-time teacher, meeting in a school building rented from the Appleton School District. By the mid-1950s, enrollment had grown, and the school relocated to its own building at 2626 N. Oneida Street in 1957. Enrollment continued to grow during the 1960s and 1970s, requiring several additions to be made to the campus, including in 1965 and 1977.

In 2000, the school relocated to a 63-acre (250,000 m^{2}) campus on Meade Street, selling its old campus to the Appleton Catholic Education System, which renovated it to accommodate the growing St. Joseph Middle School. In the summer of 2016, FVLHS added a metals shop and began offering automotive training in partnership with Fox Valley Technical College. In September 2017, the FVL General Board approved a $5.6 million expansion that added classroom and specialty spaces including a second art studio and a biomedical lab classroom. The new addition was dedicated in October 2018. School enrollment for the 2024–25 school year is 773 students.

== Athletics ==
The school is a member of the Wisconsin Interscholastic Athletic Association (WIAA) and competes in the Bay Conference, having joined in 2025 after a decade in the North Eastern Conference. Boys sports include baseball, basketball, cross country, football, golf, hockey, lacrosse, soccer, tennis, track, and wrestling. Girls sports include basketball, cheer and dance teams, cross country, golf, hockey, lacrosse, soccer, softball, tennis, track, volleyball, and wrestling. Both boys and girls hockey and lacrosse are co-op teams.

=== Athletic conference affiliation history ===
- Badger Lutheran Conference (1961-1964)
- Midwest Prep Conference (1965-1971)
- Fox Valley Christian Conference (1971-1999)
- Valley 8 Conference (1999-2007)
- Eastern Valley Conference (2007-2015)
- North Eastern Conference (2015-2025)
- Bay Conference (2025–present)

== Cocurriculars ==
In 2024–25, eighteen different opportunities are available to students. These include American Mentor Group (American students who volunteer to mentor international students), C-Bate (Debate Club), Choraliers (swing choir), Cross & Crown (school yearbook), Esports, Forensics, Future Business Leaders of America, FVL Theatre, Jazz Ensemble, Math Club, National Honor Society, Outside the Lines (Art Club), Peer Leadership Group, Perspective (Student Diversity Club), SALT (Sound & Light Team), Student Council, Trapshooting Club, and VEX Robotics.
