= Ripon High School (Wisconsin) =

High school in Wisconsin, United States

Coordinates: 43°50′11.0″N 88°49′56.0″W

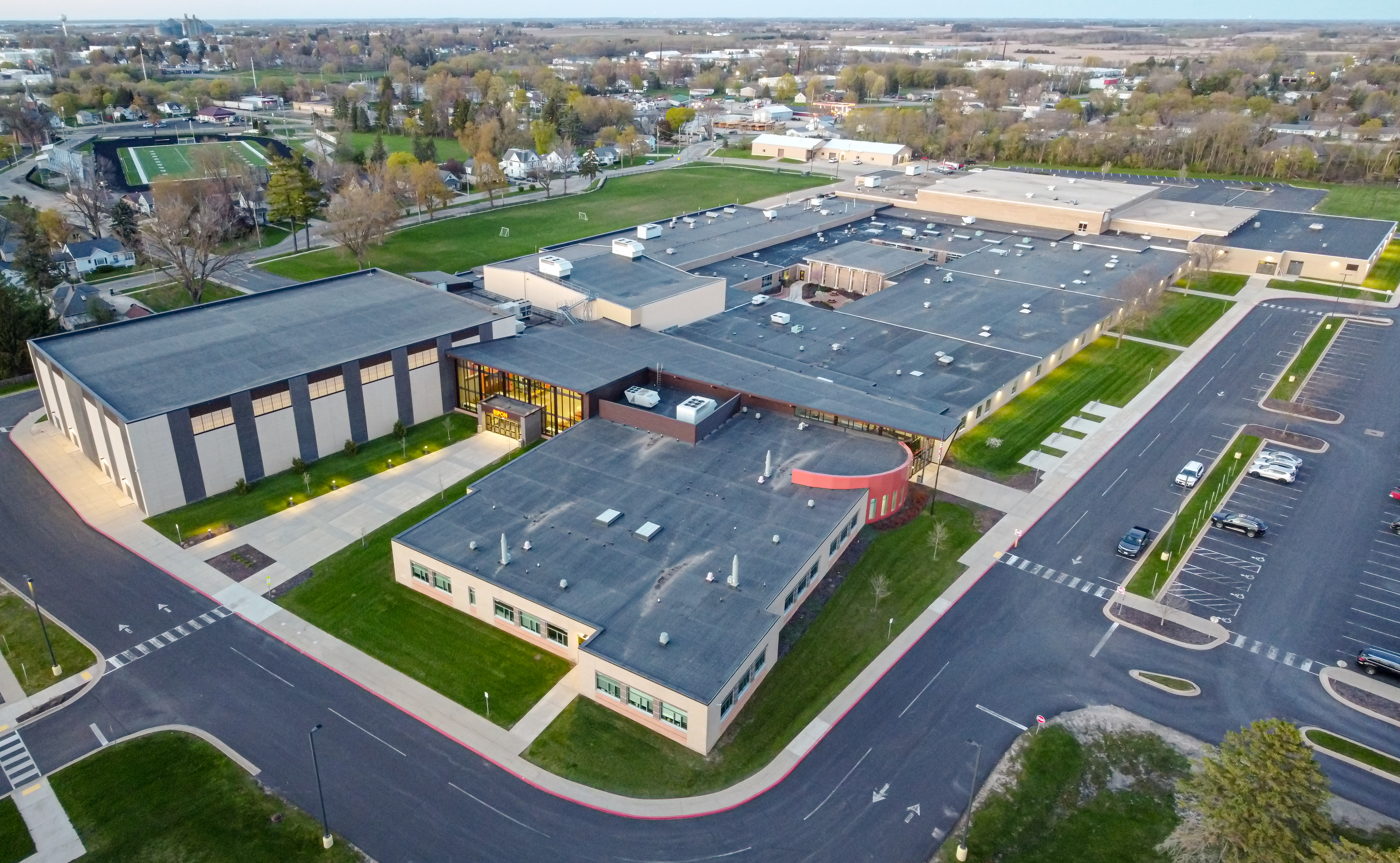
- 850 Tiger Drive; Ripon, Wisconsin 54971; United States

Information
- Type: Public
- Established: 1874
- School district: Ripon Area School District
- Principal: Bill Kinziger
- Teaching staff: 33.24 (FTE)
- Grades: 9 to 12
- Enrollment: 448 (2023-2024)
- Student to teacher ratio: 13.48
- Colors: Black and Orange
- Athletics conference: WIAA; South Central Conference
- Mascot: Tigers
- Website: www.ripon.k12.wi.us/schools/high/

Ripon High School is a public high school located in Ripon, Wisconsin. The school serves students in grades 9 through 12, and has an enrollment of about 484 students as of the 2023-2024 school year. It is the only high school in the Ripon School District.

== Sports ==
Ripon High School's mascot is the Tiger. The school has recently joined the South Central Conference after spending several years in the East Central Conference. Sports facilities include Ingalls Field. Ingalls Field has a capacity of 3500 and has FieldTurf installed on the field.

Ripon offers ten boys' varsity sports: football, soccer, cross country, basketball, wrestling, baseball, tennis, track, golf, and lacrosse and seven girls' varsity sports: tennis, volleyball, cross country, basketball, soccer, softball, and track.

Ripon's biggest rivals include the Waupun Warriors, the Mauston Golden Eagles, the Wisconsin Dells Chiefs, the Berlin Indians, and the Xavier Hawks
