= Little Chute High School =

Location
- 1402 N Freedom Road; Little Chute, Wisconsin 54140; United States; 44°17′17″N 88°18′42″W

Information
- Type: Public Secondary (High School)
- Motto: "Fostering a Community of Learners"
- Established: 1966
- School district: Little Chute Area School District
- Superintendent: David Botz
- Principal: Tony Bird
- Teaching staff: 28.17 (FTE)
- Grades: 9-12
- Gender: Co-ed
- Enrollment: 385 (2023-2024)
- Student to teacher ratio: 13.67
- Colors: Navy, columbia blue, & white
- Athletics: North Eastern Conference
- Mascot: Marty the Mustang
- Nickname: Mustangs
- Great Schools average: 5/10
- Yearbook: The Arch
- Website: LCHS Site

Little Chute High School is a public high school in Little Chute, Wisconsin.

== Extra-curricular activities and athletics ==
Little Chute's athletic teams are known as the Mustangs and compete in the North Eastern Conference.

In 2008 the Little Chute Forensics team won the Eastern Valley Conference championship, the first Forensics conference championship for the school in history.

In 2009 the Little Chute Key Club was recognized as the top club of the Wisconsin-Upper Michigan District for the ninth consecutive year.

Little Chute High School captured football conference championships in 1971, 1973, 1974, 1977, 1978, 1979, 1980, 1981, 1983, 1985, 1986 and 2002. The Little Chute High School Mustangs have also advanced to the WIAA state semi-finals on three occasions: 1977, 1980, and 1990.

In 2006 the Little Chute High School boys' basketball team took first place in the Valley 8 conference. In 2011 the team took first place in the Eastern Valley Conference and went to the state tournament for the first time in school history.

In 2006 the Little Chute Black Knights rugby team had an undefeated regular season and made a trip to state and finished runner-up. The Black Knights also finished second at state in 2011.

In 2007 the Little Chute High School girls' volleyball team won the Eastern Valley Conference championship and the WIAA regional championship.

In 2003 the Little Chute High School girls' volleyball team finished as the runner-up in the Division II State Tournament.

=== Athletic conference affiliation history ===
- Central Wisconsin Conference (1969-1974)
- East Central Conference (1974-1999)
- Valley 8 Conference (1999-2007)
- Eastern Valley Conference (2007-2015)
- North Eastern Conference (2015–present)
