= Winneconne High School =

Location
- 100 Wolf Run; Winneconne, Wisconsin 54986; United States; 44.1198°N 88.6964°W

Information
- Type: Public secondary
- School district: Winneconne Community School District
- Principal: Leah Michaud
- Teaching staff: 39.11 (on an FTE basis)
- Grades: 9-12
- Enrollment: 507 (2023-2024)
- Student to teacher ratio: 12.96
- Color
- Athletics: Bay Conference
- Nickname: Wolves
- Rival: Omro
- Website: www.hs.winneconne.k12.wi.us

Winneconne High School is a public high school in Winneconne, Wisconsin. It educates students in grades 9 through 12 and is the only high school in the Winneconne Community School District.

== History ==
A successful 2016 referendum authorized the school to build a new 600-seat auditorium as well as revamping its STEAM and business education areas.

== Academics ==
Winneconne High School offers Advanced Placement classes, which about a fifth of the student body takes.

== Demographics ==
WHS is 94 percent white, three percent Hispanic, one percent Asian and one percent black. Two percent of students identify as a part of two or more races.

== Athletics ==
The Wolves baseball team won the WIAA Division 2 title in 1992. After barely securing a playoff berth with a 4-5 record in the 2013 regular season, Winneconne won out in the playoffs and captured the Division 4 state football championship. In 2025, Winneconne again secured a Division 4 state championship for football, with a record of 13-0.

== Notable alumni ==
- Jule Berndt, politician
- Judith Klusman, politician
