= New London High School (Wisconsin) =

Location
- 1700 Klatt Road; New London, Wisconsin 54961; United States; 44°22′18.6″N 88°45′32.8″W

Information
- Type: Public
- Established: 1966
- School district: School District of New London
- Principal: Brian Yerkey
- District Administrator: Scott Bleck
- Teaching staff: 45.50 (on FTE basis)
- Grades: 9 to 12
- Enrollment: 685 (2023-2024)
- Student to teacher ratio: 15.05
- Colors: Red, black, white
- Slogan: Success for All Students
- Athletics conference: WIAA Bay Conference
- Mascot: Percy the Bulldog
- Team name: Bulldogs
- Website: https://www.newlondon.k12.wi.us/

New London High School is a public 9-12 High School Located in New London, Wisconsin. Its enrollment was estimated at 712 students for the 2023-2024 school year. NLHS moved to its current location in 1999.

== Facilities ==
A new sports stadium opened in 2009.

== Athletics ==
New London's mascot is Percy the Bulldog, and the school competes in the Bay Conference with eight other schools. New London competed in the East Central Conference from 1970 to 1979. New London competed in the Mid Eastern Conference from 1962 to 1969.

=== State championships ===
- Boys' basketball 1999 Division 2
- Girls' swimming - 2007 Division 2 200 Medley State Champions
- Girls' track and field wheelchair 2010
- Girls' basketball - 2011 Division 2
- Girls' basketball - 2012 Division 2
- Girls' softball - 2013 Division 2
- Girls' wrestling - 2021 Division 2
- Girls' wrestling - 2022 Division 2
- Girls' wrestling - 2023 Division 2

== Performing arts ==
NLHS has a competitive show choir named "Vision". Until 2017, the school hosted its own competition, the Center Stage Invitational. In 2022, the school once more began to host an annual show choir competition, renamed as the New London Singstock Festival.

== Alumni ==
- Cole Konrad, first Bellator MMA heavyweight champion in 2010
- Jack Voight, Wisconsin State Treasurer, Class of 1963
- Esther Heideman, American opera singer, Class of 1988
