= Bay Conference =

Wisconsin high school athletic conference

- Conference: WIAA
- Founded: 1970
- Commissioner: Joel Wondra
- No. of teams: 9
- Headquarters: Shawano, Wisconsin
- Website: http://www.bayconference.org/

The Bay Conference is a high school athletics conference made up of nine schools in northeastern Wisconsin, centering primarily around the Green Bay and Fox Valley metropolitan areas. The conference and its member schools are members of the Wisconsin Interscholastic Athletic Association.

== History ==
=== 1970–2007 ===
Location of Original Bay Conference Members

The Bay Conference was established in 1970 by charter members Ashwaubenon, Bay Port, Clintonville, De Pere, Marinette, Oconto, Oconto Falls, Pulaski, Seymour, and West De Pere. Eight of the original members of the Bay Conference competed previously in the Northeastern Wisconsin Conference, all with the exception of Clintonville (Mid-Eastern Conference) and Marinette (independent).1979 brought the addition of former East Central Conference member New London and former Wisconsin Valley Conference member Shawano, in exchange for Oconto and Oconto Falls, who would go to the Central Wisconsin Conference. In 1999, Clintonville left the Bay Conference to join the newly formed Valley 8 Conference. Of the ten original members, only Seymour has remained in the conference since its inception.

=== 2007–2015 ===
In 2007, realignment in the Fox Valley region by the WIAA brought major changes to the Bay Conference. Four schools (Ashwaubenon, Bay Port, De Pere and Pulaski) transferred to the Fox River Classic Conference (FRCC), where they joined the larger Green Bay, Manitowoc, and Sheboygan area high schools. Replacing the departing schools were two former members of the Packerland Conference (Denmark and Luxemburg-Casco) and two schools from the shuttered Valley 8 Conference (Hortonville and Oconto Falls). Each of these schools had increasing enrollments and had outgrown their previous conferences.

In late 2008, Hortonville petitioned the WIAA to move the growing school into the Fox Valley Association in exchange for Menasha High School, whose declining enrollment prompted them to look at other alternatives. Hortonville cited travel times and costs as well as the imbalance that existed in the Bay Conference as reasons to leave. Hortonville's enrollment was nearly twice as large as the Bay Conference's smallest school and 200 students more than the second largest school. The issue came to a vote at a Menasha School Board meeting, which resulted in Menasha's decision to remain in the FVA. In September 2011, at an WIAA area meeting held in Appleton, Green Bay West requested to leave the FRCC to join the Bay Conference, and Green Bay East asked to go if needed. West and East both cited their inability to compete in the FRCC. In a September 2012 WIAA area meeting, New London asked to leave the Bay Conference to move to the Eastern Valley Conference, and Denmark requested to leave. Green Bay East and West are still seeking to move. At a WIAA Board of Control meeting in September, the board gave first approval to swap Hortonville with FVA member Menasha before the 2014-15 school year. A final vote was taken after the 40-day appeal window and passed. In December 2013, the WIAA Board of Control gave first approval for the departure of Denmark, Luxemburg–Casco, Marinette and Oconto Falls to the Eastern Valley in Return for the FRCC's Green Bay East & West and the EVC's Xavier. Waupaca would be in the Bay for football only. A final vote was taken after the 40-day appeal window & successfully passed for implementation for the 2015–2016 school year along with several other conference realignments.

=== 2015–present ===
Starting in 2015, the conference stayed steady at eight schools. However, in September 2016, West De Pere requested to move to the FRCC, citing inadequate athletic competition in the Bay and a school size that was rapidly growing. Other reasons included rivalries against teams in the FRCC like De Pere, Ashwaubenon and Pulaski. In December 2019, as part of the realignment process, West De Pere formally filed a request to move to the FRCC. After a committee reviewed the process, West De Pere's request was denied due to their failure to provide documents showing discussions with the Northeastern Conference which was provided as a solution to fill the void leaving the Bay Conference. West De Pere chose not to appeal the rejection.

In 2018, the WIAA and Wisconsin Football Coaches Association released a realignment plan to go into effect starting in fall 2020 for football only. The proposal has Green Bay West, Green Bay East, West De Pere, and Menasha moving to the FRCC, with Fox Valley Lutheran and Marinette joining the five other remaining Bay football schools in a revamped Bay where Shawano would be the largest school in terms of enrollment. After some modifications the final Bay Conference will consist of current schools New London, Seymour, Shawano, Waupaca and Xavier, as well as football-only schools Fox Valley Lutheran and Winneconne. In 2022 A slight modification sent FVL to the Northeastern for 2 seasons setting up double crossover games between the Bay and Northeastern Conferences in Weeks 3 and 4 of the regular season, These 2 games counted in the conference standings and for playoff qualification purposes. FVL will return in 2024 and teams in the Bay and Northeastern will have 1 Crossover game to count in the conference and playoff standings. Football Only conferences run on a 2 year window to make changes.

In late 2023 West De Pere once again filed a Fast Track Request to move to the FRCC, Also Winneconne and Fox Valley Lutheran made the request to move the growing schools into the Bay Conference. The first process saw both moves with Unanimous support from the Realignment Task Force Committee to move to the next steps. This proposal became official in April 2024 with the changes taking effect in the 2025-2026 School year. In November 2025, Appleton West had formally filed a request to move the school into the Bay Conference, which was officially approved by the WIAA's Board of Control in March 2026.

== List of member schools ==
=== Current full members ===
School	Location	Affiliation	Enrollment	Mascot	Colors	Joined
Fox Valley Lutheran	Appleton, WI	Private (Lutheran, WELS)	833	Foxes		2025
Green Bay East	Green Bay, WI	Public	1,124	Red Devils		2015
Green Bay West	Green Bay, WI	Public	841	Wildcats		2015
Menasha	Menasha, WI	Public	949	Bluejays		2014
New London	New London, WI	Public	662	Bulldogs		1979
Seymour	Seymour, WI	Public	544	Thunder		1970
Shawano	Shawano, WI	Public	687	Hawks		1979
Winneconne	Winneconne, WI	Public	508	Wolves		2025
Xavier	Appleton, WI	Private (Catholic)	439	Hawks		2015

=== Current associate members ===
School	Location	Affiliation	Mascot	Colors	Primary Conference	Sport(s)
Bonduel	Bonduel, WI	Public	Bears		Central Wisconsin	Girls Golf
Clintonville	Clintonville, WI	Public	Truckers		North Eastern	Girls Swimming
Marinette	Marinette, WI	Public	Marines		North Eastern	Girls Swimming, (Note: Co-operative with Peshtigo) Girls Tennis
Oconto	Oconto, WI	Public	Blue Devils		Packerland	Girls Golf
St. Mary Catholic	Neenah, WI	Private (Catholic)	Zephyrs		Big East	Girls Golf
Sturgeon Bay	Sturgeon Bay, WI	Public	Clippers		Packerland	Girls Golf
Waupaca	Waupaca, WI	Public	Comets		North Eastern	Football
Wittenberg-Birnamwood	Wittenberg, WI	Public	Chargers		Central Wisconsin	Girls Swimming

=== Current co-operative members ===
Team	Colors	Host School	Co-operative Members	Sport(s)
Door County United		Sturgeon Bay	Sevastopol, Southern Door	Girls Swimming

=== Future full members ===
School	Location	Affiliation	Enrollment	Mascot	Colors	Joining	Former Conference
Appleton West	Appleton, WI	Public	1,405	Terrors		2027	Fox Valley Association

=== Former members ===
School	Location	Affiliation	Mascot	Colors	Joined	Left	Conference Joined	Current Conference
Ashwaubenon	Ashwaubenon, WI	Public	Jaguars		1970	2007	Fox River Classic	
Bay Port	Suamico, WI	Public	Pirates		1970	2007	Fox River Classic	
Clintonville	Clintonville, WI	Public	Truckers		1970	1999	Valley 8	North Eastern
De Pere	De Pere, WI	Public	Redbirds		1970	2007	Fox River Classic	
Denmark	Denmark, WI	Public	Vikings		2007	2015	North Eastern	
Hortonville	Hortonville, WI	Public	Polar Bears		2007	2014	Fox Valley Association	
Luxemburg-Casco	Luxemburg, WI	Public	Spartans		2007	2015	North Eastern	
Marinette	Marinette, WI	Public	Marines		1970	2015	North Eastern	
Oconto	Oconto, WI	Public	Blue Devils		1970	1979	Central Wisconsin	Packerland
Oconto Falls	Oconto Falls, WI	Public	Panthers		1970, 2007	1979, 2015	Central Wisconsin, North Eastern	North Eastern
Pulaski	Pulaski, WI	Public	Red Raiders		1970	2007	Fox River Classic	
West De Pere	De Pere, WI	Public	Phantoms		1970	2025	Fox River Classic	

== Membership map ==
Bay Conference
Location of Bay Conference full members:
1 Fox Valley Lutheran
2 Green Bay East
3 Green Bay West
4 Menasha
5 New London
6 Seymour
7 Shawano
8 Winnecone
9 ●avier

== Sponsored sports ==
	Baseball	Boys Basketball	Girls Basketball	Boys Cross Country	Girls Cross Country	Football	Boys Golf	Girls Golf	Boys Soccer	Girls Soccer	Softball	Girls Swim & Dive	Boys Tennis	Girls Tennis	Boys Track & Field	Girls Track & Field	Girls Volleyball	Boys Wrestling	Girls Wrestling
Fox Valley Lutheran	●	●	●	●	●	●	●	●	●	●	●		●	●	●	●	●	●	●
Green Bay East	● (Note: Co-operative with Green Bay West)	●	●	●	●		●		●	●			●	●	●	●	●		
Green Bay West		●	●	●	●				●	●	● (Note: Co-operative with Green Bay East)		●	●	●	●	●	● (Note: Co-operative with Green Bay East and Green Bay Southwest)	●
Menasha	●	●	●	●	●				●	●	●		●	●	●	●	●	●	●
New London	●	●	●	●	●	●	●	●	●	●	●	●		●	●	●	●	●	●
Seymour	●	●	●	●	●	●	●	●	●	●	●	● (Note: Co-operative with Freedom)			●	●	●	●	●
Shawano	●	●	●	●	●	●	●	●	●	●	●	● (Note: Co-operative with Bonduel)	●	●	●	●	●	●	●
Winneconne	●	●	●	●	●	●	●	●	●	●	●				●	●	●	●	●
Xavier	●	●	●	●	●	●	●	●	●	●	●		●	●	●	●	●	●	●

== List of state champions ==
=== Fall sports ===
Girls Cross Country
School	Year	Division
Xavier	2022	Division 2
Xavier	2023	Division 2

Football
School	Year	Division
Clintonville	1978	Division 2
Seymour	1985	Division 3
Marinette	1989	Division 2
De Pere	1992	Division 3
Ashwaubenon	1996	Division 2
Ashwaubenon	2000	Division 2
Ashwaubenon	2001	Division 2
Ashwaubenon	2005	Division 2
West De Pere	2010	Division 3
West De Pere	2011	Division 3
Menasha	2014	Division 2

Boys Soccer
School	Year	Division
De Pere	1993	Division 2

Girls Tennis
School	Year	Division
Xavier	2020	Division 2

Girls Volleyball
School	Year	Division
Seymour	1988	Class B
Shawano	1988	Class A
Xavier	2022	Division 2
Xavier	2023	Division 2

=== Winter sports ===
Boys Basketball
School	Year	Division
Clintonville	1977	Class B
Clintonville	1989	Class B
Seymour	1997	Division 2
New London	1999	Division 2
Seymour	2001	Division 2
Seymour	2006	Division 2
Xavier	2017	Division 3

Girls Basketball
School	Year	Division
De Pere	1983	Class A
De Pere	2005	Division 1
Ashwaubenon	2006	Division 1
New London	2011	Division 2
New London	2012	Division 2

Girls Gymnastics
School	Year	Division
De Pere	1986	Class B
De Pere	1987	Class B
De Pere	1988	Class B
De Pere	1989	Class B
De Pere	1990	Class B

Boys Swimming & Diving
School	Year	Division
Ashwaubenon	2002	Division 2

Boys Wrestling
School	Year	Division
Oconto Falls	2010	Division 2
Luxemburg-Casco	2012	Division 2
Luxemburg-Casco	2013	Division 2

=== Spring sports ===
Baseball
School	Year	Division
Oconto Falls	1973	Single Division
Oconto Falls	1978	Class B
West De Pere	2008	Division 2

Boys Golf
School	Year	Division
Seymour	2025	Division 2
Winneconne	2026	Division 2

Softball
School	Year	Division
Ashwaubenon	1992	Division 1
Ashwaubenon	1993	Division 1
Ashwaubenon	1994	Division 1
Shawano	2002	Division 2
Ashwaubenon	2006	Division 1
Luxemburg-Casco	2009	Division 2
Luxemburg-Casco	2010	Division 2
New London	2013	Division 2
Seymour	2019	Division 2
Fox Valley Lutheran	2026	Division 2

Boys Track & Field
School	Year	Division
Ashwaubenon	1974	Class B
Seymour	1981	Class B
Xavier	2017	Division 2
Winneconne	2026	Division 2

Girls Track & Field
School	Year	Division
Marinette	1992	Division 1
Marinette	1993	Division 1
Marinette	1994	Division 1
West De Pere	2022	Division 1

== List of conference champions ==
=== Boys Basketball ===
School	Quantity	Years
Seymour	16	1995, 1997, 1998, 1999, 2000, 2003, 2004, 2007, 2009, 2010, 2011, 2012, 2014, 2015, 2020, 2026
Pulaski	8	1972, 1984, 1987, 1990, 1991, 1992, 1994, 1996
Xavier	8	2016, 2017, 2018, 2019, 2021, 2022, 2023, 2024
Marinette	6	1977, 1979, 1985, 1987, 1988, 2008
West De Pere	6	1971, 1976, 1986, 2013, 2022, 2025
Ashwaubenon	4	1993, 1999, 2002, 2006
Bay Port	4	1981, 2001, 2002, 2003
Clintonville	4	1974, 1979, 1980, 1989
De Pere	3	1973, 1978, 2005
Oconto	3	1973, 1974, 1975
New London	1	1983
Shawano	1	1982
Denmark	0	
Fox Valley Lutheran	0	
Green Bay East	0	
Green Bay West	0	
Hortonville	0	
Luxemburg-Casco	0	
Menasha	0	
Oconto Falls	0	
Winneconne	0	

=== Girls Basketball ===
School	Quantity	Years
West De Pere	11	1977, 1979, 1981, 2015, 2016, 2017, 2019, 2020, 2021, 2023, 2025
Pulaski	10	1980, 1981, 1991, 1992, 1993, 1995, 1996, 1997, 1998, 2000
De Pere	9	1978, 1982, 1983, 1984, 1985, 1999, 2001, 2006, 2007
Bay Port	8	1982, 1983, 1986, 1987, 1990, 2002, 2003, 2004
Ashwaubenon	5	1976, 1994, 2001, 2004, 2005
New London	5	2008, 2009, 2012, 2013, 2014
Seymour	3	1978, 1991, 2018
Xavier	3	2022, 2024, 2026
Luxemburg-Casco	2	2010, 2011
Shawano	2	1988, 1989
Clintonville	1	1982
Denmark	0	
Fox Valley Lutheran	0	
Green Bay East	0	
Green Bay West	0	
Hortonville	0	
Marinette	0	
Menasha	0	
Oconto	0	
Oconto Falls	0	
Winneconne	0	

=== Football ===
School	Quantity	Years
West De Pere	19	1971, 1973, 1979, 1981, 1982, 1983, 1987, 1988, 1997, 2006, 2007, 2008, 2009, 2010, 2011, 2012, 2017, 2018, 2019
Marinette	9	1974, 1975, 1977, 1979, 1989, 1993, 1994, 1999, 2000
Ashwaubenon	7	1979, 1990, 1993, 2000, 2001, 2002, 2004
De Pere	5	1972, 1992, 1995, 2000, 2005
Xavier	5	2015, 2020, 2021, 2022, 2023
Clintonville	4	1976, 1978, 1981, 1987
Pulaski	4	1970, 1980, 1991, 1998
Seymour	4	1985, 1991, 1996, 2009
Menasha	3	2014, 2016, 2017
New London	3	1982, 1984, 2007
Winneconne	3	2024, 2025, 2026
Bay Port	2	2001, 2003
Denmark	1	2007
Oconto	1	1970
Shawano	1	2009
Fox Valley Lutheran	0	
Green Bay East	0	
Green Bay West	0	
Hortonville	1	2013
Luxemburg-Casco	0	
Oconto Falls	0	
Waupaca	0	
