= Omro High School =

Location
- 455 Fox Trail; Omro, Wisconsin 54963; United States
- Coordinates: 44.046371°N 88.739555°W

Information
- School type: public
- Established: c. 1872
- School district: Omro School District
- CEEB code: 501695
- Principal: Kathy Cady
- Teaching staff: 22.81 (on an FTE basis)
- Grades: 9-12
- Gender: coeducational
- Enrollment: 331 (2023-2024)
- Student to teacher ratio: 14.51
- Colours: Maroon and gold
- Song: Washington and Lee Swing
- Athletics: WIAA District 4
- Athletics conference: Wisconsin Flyway Conference
- Mascot: Fox
- Nickname: Fighting Foxes
- Rival: Winneconne
- Newspaper: Fox Tale, Omro Herald

Omro High School is a public high school in Omro, Wisconsin.

== Campus ==
A new school was built in 1963. The middle school was added to the building in 1983, and a large addition to the high school was built in 2000.

== Extracurricular activities ==
Student groups and activities include academic bowl, art club, audiovisual club, Badger Boys/Badger Girls, forensics, FBLA, FFA, history club, Key Club, math team, National Honor Society, O-Club (Varsity letter recipients), Students Against Destructive Decisions, ski club, Spanish club, and student council.

=== Athletics ===
The Omro Foxes compete in the Wisconsin Flyway Conference. They formerly belonged to the Eastern Valley Conference and before that the East Central Flyway Conference. Omro High School fields teams in soccer, baseball, basketball, cheerleading, cross country, dance, football, golf, powerlifting, softball, track & field, volleyball, and wrestling. An equestrian club/team began competition in fall 2008.

Every fall the Omro Foxes football team competes against the Winneconne Wolves for the China Bull Trophy, one of the oldest football rivalries in the state of Wisconsin.

While in the ECC, the boys' basketball team won 12 conference titles over a 15-year span. Their two state appearances also came during this 15-year span. In 2007, the Foxes track team won its first ECFC conference title and first WIAA sectional championship. In the fall of 2008, the Foxes boys' soccer team won the school's first Wisconsin Interscholastic Athletic Association (WIAA) regional championship. The soccer team broke its three-year regional title match losing streak by winning 1-0. In 2010 the powerlifting team captured its first state title. In the fall of 2010 the Foxes football team made its return to the state playoffs after a 12-year drought. The team lost in the second round of the playoffs.

==== State championships ====
- 1997 Division 3 state basketball champions
- 1999 Division 3 state basketball runner-up
- 2007 Boys' Division 2 300m hurdle state champion (Patrick Plank)
- 2008 Boys' Division 2 state 4x200m relay runner-up
- 2009 Girls' Division 2 state 4x200m relay champions
- 2009 Division 2 state powerlifting runner-up
- 2010 Division 2 state powerlifting champions
- 2010 Division C equestrian team reserve state champions

== Notable alumni ==
- Gordon R. Bradley, Wisconsin State Assembly
- Fred L. Holmes, Wisconsin State Assembly
- Andy Jorgensen (1986), Wisconsin State Assembly
- Olin B. Lewis (1879), Minnesota politician
