= Waupaca High School =

High school in Waupaca, Wisconsin

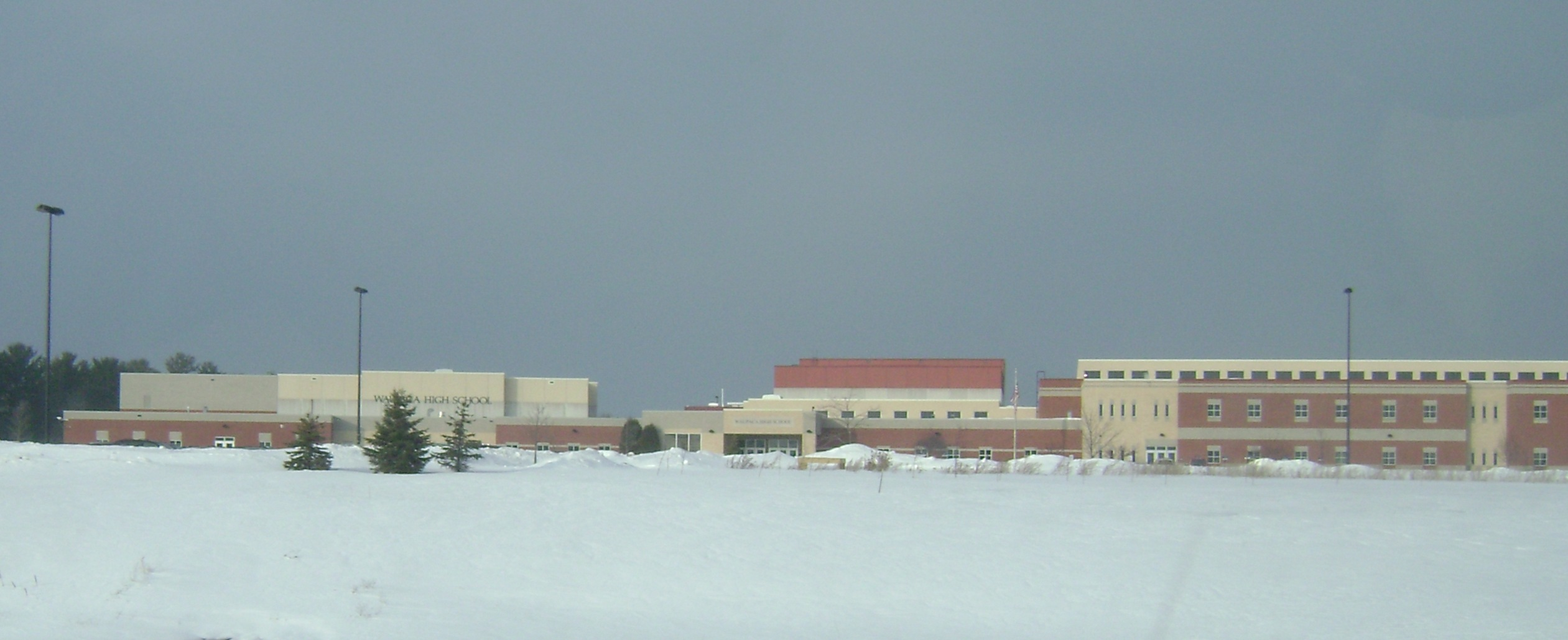
- Waupaca Comets

Location
- E 2325 King Road; Waupaca, Wisconsin 54981; United States
- Coordinates: 44°20′10″N 89°06′39″W

Information
- Type: Public
- School district: School District of Waupaca
- Principal: Michael Werbowsky
- Staff: 43.95 (FTE)
- Grades: 9 to 12
- Enrollment: 605 (2023–2024)
- Student to teacher ratio: 13.77
- Colors: Navy Blue and White
- Slogan: Building foundations for responsible citizenship and lifelong learning.
- Athletics conference: North Eastern Conference; Bay Conference (football only)
- Sports: football, basketball, baseball, volleyball, wrestling, cross country, softball, dance, track and field, hockey, golf, soccer
- Nickname: Comets
- Team name: Comets
- Website: https://www.waupaca.k12.wi.us/schools/high/

Waupaca High School is a public high school located in Waupaca, Wisconsin. The school educates about 600 students in grades 9 to 12.

== History ==
Waupaca High School moved to its current location in 2000 with the completion of a new facility. Waupaca Middle School occupies the former high school building.

== Academics ==
Waupaca High School's academic offerings include core mathematics, English, social sciences, and pure and applied sciences.

== Extracurricular activities ==
Waupaca High School offers extracurricular activities that include chess, forensics, dance, a math team, debating, solo and ensemble instrumental music, drama, solo and ensemble vocal music, FFA, an art club, SADD, Beat the Heat, a Spanish club, STARS, a German club, student council, VICA, Key Club, National Honor Society, yearbook, robotics, and a pep club.

The Waupaca High School Chess Team won the Division 1 state Scholastic Chess Championship in 2022. They are the smallest and most northern school to ever win the title.

== Enrollment ==
From 2000 to 2019, high school enrollment declined 28.0%.

Enrollment at Waupaca High School, 2000–2019

== Athletics ==
Waupaca's athletic teams are known as the Comets, and compete primarily in the North Eastern Conference except for football, where they compete in the Bay Conference. The Comets have won seven WIAA state championships.

State Championships
Year	Division/Class	Sport
2016	2	Baseball
2008	3	Football
2006	3	Football
1969	N/A	Curling
1965	N/A	Curling
1962	S	Cross country (boys)
1961	N/A	Curling
