= Clintonville High School =

Public secondary school in Wisconsin, US

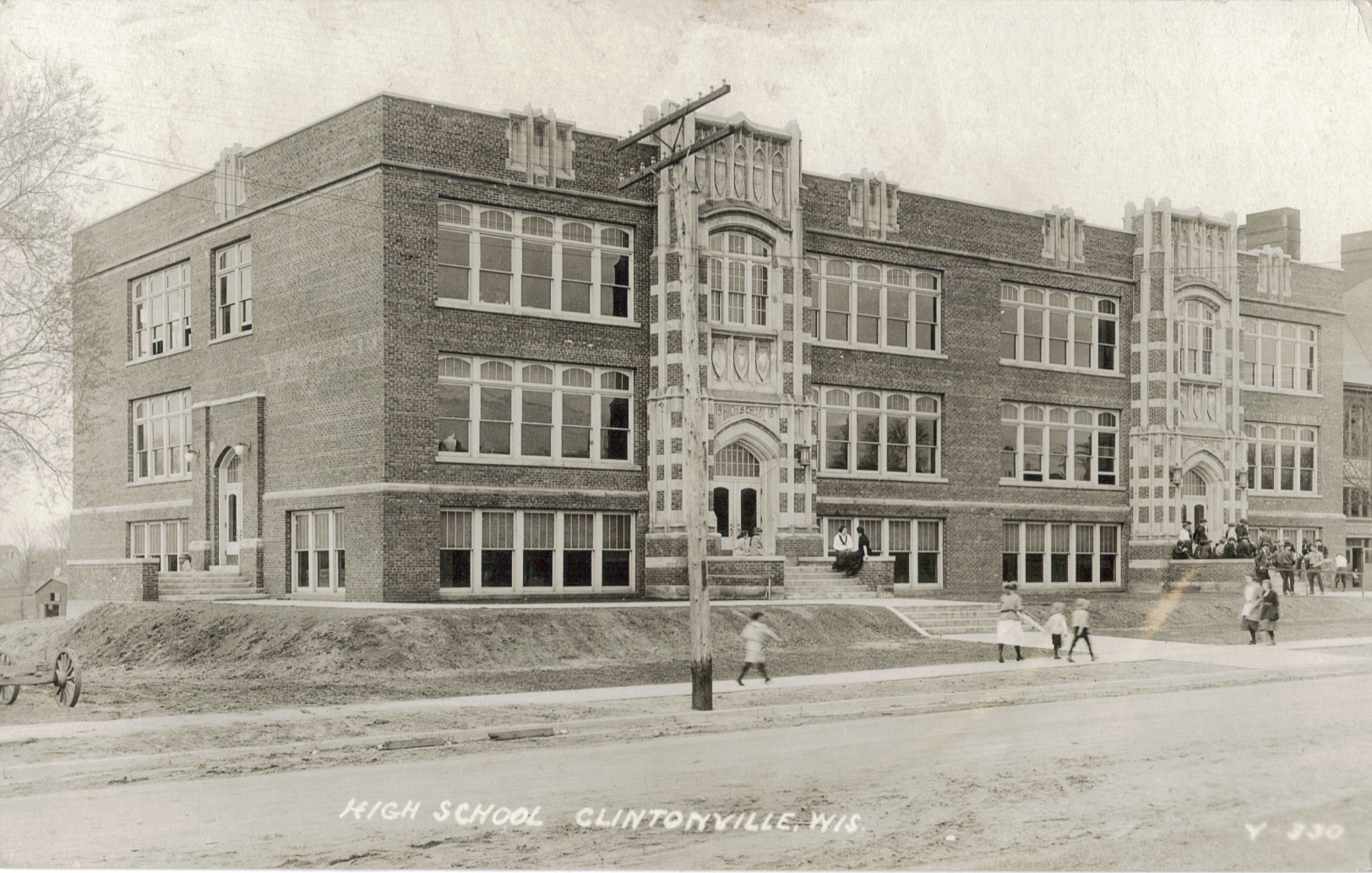

Location
- 64 W Green Tree Rd; Clintonville, Wisconsin 54929; United States; 44.6366°N 88.7555°W

Information
- School type: Public High School
- Established: 2003
- School district: Clintonville Public School District
- Principal: James Blashe
- Teaching staff: 34.56 (FTE)
- Grades: 9 through 12
- Enrollment: 397 (2023-2024)
- Student to teacher ratio: 11.49
- Color
- Athletics conference: North Eastern Conference; Bay Conference (affiliated member)
- Mascot: Trucker

Clintonville High School is a public high school in Clintonville, Wisconsin, that serves the town of Clintonville, as well as the neighboring villages of Embarrass and Bear Creek. It has occupied its current building since 2003.

== Athletics ==
Clintonville's athletic teams are known as the Truckers. They compete in the Northeastern Conference, and are affiliated with the Bay Conference.

== Enrollment ==
From 2000 to 2019, high school enrollment declined 22.8%.

Enrollment at Clintonville High School, 2000–2019

View source data.
