= North Eastern Conference (Wisconsin) =

Wisconsin high school athletic conference

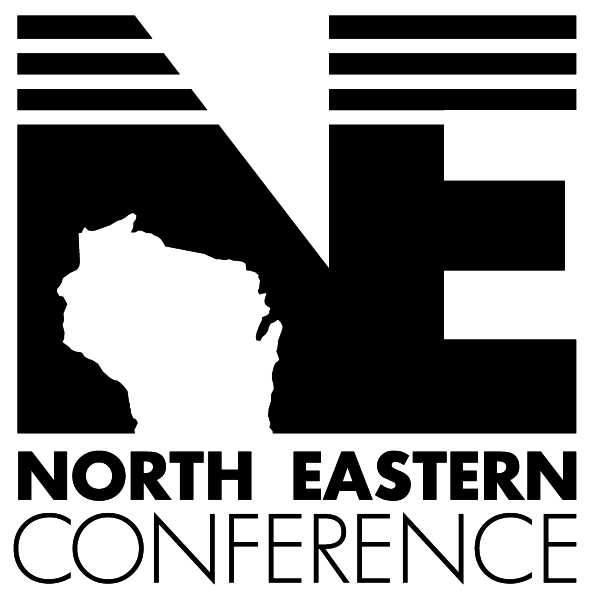

The North Eastern Conference is a high school athletic conference based in northeastern Wisconsin. Founded in 2015, the conference and its member schools are affiliated with the Wisconsin Interscholastic Athletic Association.

== History ==
The North Eastern Conference was founded in 2015 by ten medium-sized high schools in northeastern Wisconsin. Half of the conference's membership roster came from the disbanded Eastern Valley Conference (Clintonville, Fox Valley Lutheran, Freedom, Little Chute and Waupaca), four members were formerly in the Bay Conference (Denmark, Luxemburg-Casco, Marinette and Oconto Falls) and Wrightstown joined after the Olympian Conference ceased operations. There were no changes to conference membership for its first ten seasons, until it was announced that Fox Valley Lutheran will be joining with larger schools in the Bay Conference for the 2025–26 school year.

=== Football-only alignment ===
Football has been sponsored by the North Eastern Conference for its entire history, with nine of the original ten members participating. Waupaca belonged to the Bay Conference as an associate member for football when the North Eastern Conference was formed and has not competed in its football alignment to date. In February 2019, the WIAA and Wisconsin Football Coaches Association unveiled a comprehensive realignment plan for Wisconsin high school football, subject to realignment every two years. The North Eastern Conference's football alignment under this plan kept six member schools (Denmark, Freedom, Little Chute, Luxemburg-Casco, Marinette and Wrightstown) with Clintonville and Oconto Falls becoming members of the MONLPC Football Conference and Fox Valley Lutheran joining the Bay Conference. Menominee High School, located just across the Menominee River from Marinette in the upper peninsula of Michigan, joined as its seventh member. Kingsford High School in Michigan joined as an eighth member for the 2021 season, before the realignment of the 2022-2023 competition cycle placed them back into Michigan-based conferences. Marinette was moved to the Packerland Conference, and was replaced by full members Fox Valley Lutheran, who were previously football-only members in the Bay Conference. Since the North Eastern Conference was now down to six members for football, they entered into a double-crossover scheduling partnership with the Bay Conference, who also stood at six participants. In 2024, Fox Valley Lutheran made their return to the Bay Conference as a football member (before joining as full members in 2025), coupled with Sheboygan Falls and Two Rivers moving over from the Eastern Wisconsin Conference. With both conferences now standing at seven members, the scheduling alliance with the Bay Conference continued as a mandatory single-crossover game for each school. For the 2026-2027 realignment cycle, Two Rivers will be exiting to rejoin the Eastern Wisconsin, exchanging affiliations with the Kohler/Sheboygan Christian/Sheboygan Lutheran football cooperative.

== List of conference members ==
=== Current full members ===
School	Location	Affiliation	Enrollment	Mascot	Colors	Joined
Clintonville	Clintonville, WI	Public	387	Truckers		2015
Denmark	Denmark, WI	Public	491	Vikings		2015
Freedom	Freedom, WI	Public	495	Irish		2015
Little Chute	Little Chute, WI	Public	478	Mustangs		2015
Luxemburg-Casco	Luxemburg, WI	Public	664	Spartans		2015
Marinette	Marinette, WI	Public	576	Marines		2015
Oconto Falls	Oconto Falls, WI	Public	500	Panthers		2015
Waupaca	Waupaca, WI	Public	635	Comets		2015
Wrightstown	Wrightstown, WI	Public	426	Tigers		2015

=== Current associate members ===
School	Location	Affiliation	Mascot	Colors	Primary Conference	Sport(s)
Kohler	Kohler, WI	Public	Blue Bombers		Big East	Football (Note: Co-operative with Sheboygan Christian and Sheboygan Lutheran)
Sheboygan Falls	Sheboygan Falls, WI	Public	Falcons		Eastern Wisconsin	Football

=== Former full members ===
School	Location	Affiliation	Mascot	Colors	Joined	Left	Conference Joined	Current Conference
Fox Valley Lutheran	Appleton, WI	Private (Lutheran, WELS)	Foxes		2015	2025	Bay	

=== Former football-only members ===
School	Location	Affiliation	Mascot	Colors	Seasons	Primary Conference
Kingsford	Kingsford, MI	Public	Flivvers		2021	Great Northern U.P.
Menominee	Menominee, MI	Public	Maroons		2020-2021	Great Northern U.P.
Two Rivers	Two Rivers, WI	Public	Purple Raiders		2024-2025	Eastern Wisconsin

== Membership map ==
North Eastern Conference
Location of North Eastern Conference full members:
1 Clintonville
2 Denmark
3 Freedom
4 Little Chute
5 Luxemburg-Casco
6 Marinette
7 Oconto Falls
8 Waupaca
9 Wrightstown

== Sponsored sports ==
	Baseball	Boys Basketball	Girls Basketball	Boys Cross Country	Girls Cross Country	Football	Boys Golf	Girls Golf	Boys Soccer	Girls Soccer	Softball	Boys Track & Field	Girls Track & Field	Girls Volleyball	Boys Wrestling	Girls Wrestling
Clintonville	●	●	●	●	●		●		●	●	●	●	●	●	●	●
Denmark	●	●	●	●	●	●	●	●	●	●	●	●	●	●	●	●
Freedom	●	●	●	●	●	●	●	●	●	●	●	●	●	●	●	●
Little Chute	●	●	●	●	●	●	●	●	●	●	●	●	●	●	●	●
Luxemburg-Casco	●	●	●	●	●	●	●	●	●	●	●	●	●	●	●	●
Marinette	●	●	●	●	●		●	●	●	●	●	●	●	●	●	●
Oconto Falls	●	●	●	●	●		●	●			●	●	●	●	●	●
Waupaca	●	●	●	●	●		●	●	●	●	●	●	●	●	●	●
Wrightstown	●	●	●	●	●	●	●	●	●	●	●	●	●	●	●	●

== List of state champions ==
=== Fall sports ===
Girls Cross Country
School	Year	Division
Freedom	2017	Division 2

Girls Volleyball
School	Year	Division
Luxemburg-Casco	2019	Division 2
Luxemburg-Casco	2020	Division 2
Luxemburg-Casco	2021	Division 2

=== Winter sports ===
Boys Wrestling
School	Year	Division
Luxemburg-Casco	2018	Division 2
Freedom	2019	Division 2
Wrightstown	2020	Division 2
Luxemburg-Casco	2023	Division 2
Luxemburg-Casco	2024	Division 2

=== Spring sports ===
Baseball
School	Year	Division
Waupaca	2016	Division 2
Denmark	2021	Division 2
Denmark	2022	Division 2
Denmark	2023	Division 3

Softball
School	Year	Division
Freedom	2022	Division 2
Freedom	2023	Division 2

Boys Track & Field
School	Year	Division
Freedom	2016	Division 2
Freedom	2019	Division 2

Girls Track & Field
School	Year	Division
Freedom	2021	Division 2
Freedom	2024	Division 2

== List of conference champions ==
=== Boys Basketball ===
School	Quantity	Years
Wrightstown	5	2016, 2018, 2019, 2020, 2021
Freedom	4	2019, 2021, 2025, 2026
Fox Valley Lutheran	3	2022, 2023, 2024
Luxemburg-Casco	2	2016, 2017
Denmark	1	2019
Little Chute	1	2023
Clintonville	0	
Marinette	0	
Oconto Falls	0	
Waupaca	0	

=== Girls Basketball ===
School	Quantity	Years
Freedom	6	2016, 2019, 2020, 2021, 2022, 2023
Wrightstown	4	2017, 2018, 2019, 2020
Marinette	2	2024, 2025
Denmark	1	2026
Luxemburg-Casco	1	2019
Clintonville	0	
Fox Valley Lutheran	0	
Little Chute	0	
Oconto Falls	0	
Waupaca	0	

=== Football ===
School	Quantity	Years
Freedom	5	2015, 2019, 2020, 2024, 2026
Little Chute	3	2018, 2022, 2025
Luxemburg-Casco	3	2016, 2021, 2023
Wrightstown	1	2017
Clintonville	0	
Denmark	0	
Fox Valley Lutheran	0	
Kingsford (MI)	0	
KLC Football	0	
Marinette	0	
Menominee (MI)	0	
Oconto Falls	0	
Sheboygan Falls	0	
Two Rivers	0	
