= Addy van den Krommenacker =

Dutch fashion designer

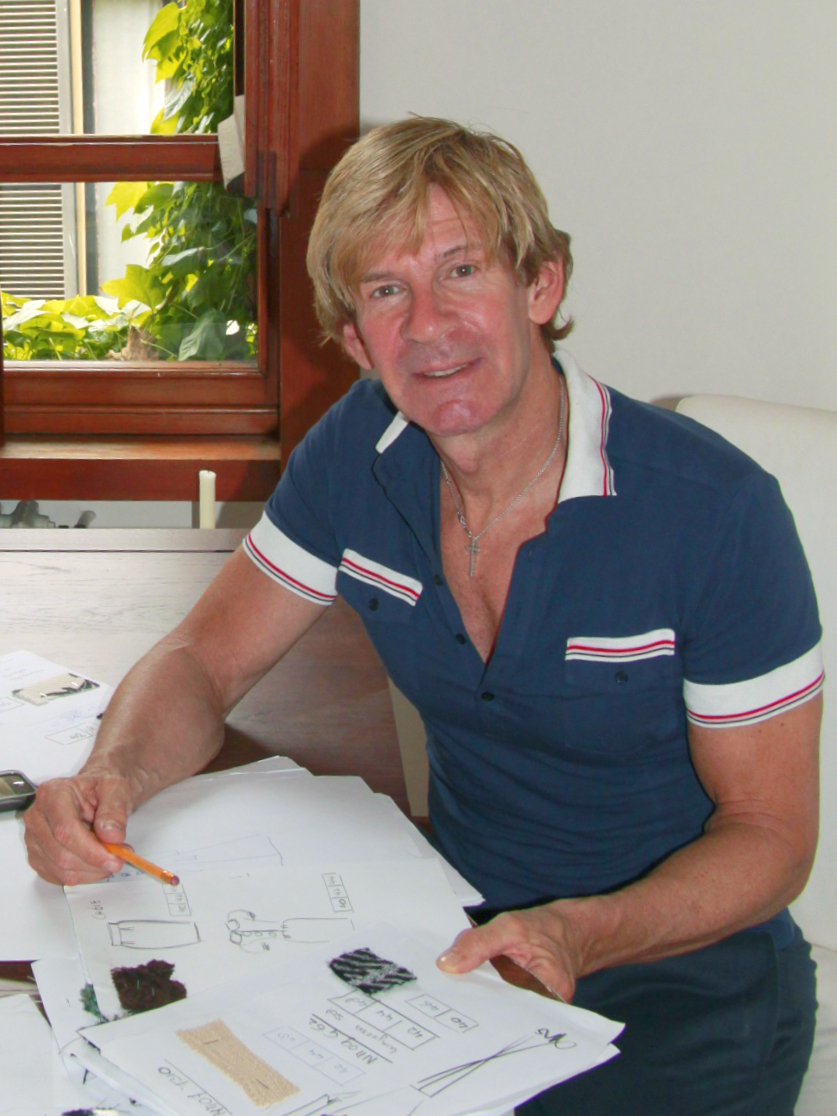
Addy van den Krommenacker (2009)

Addy van den Krommenacker (Uden 8 April 1950) is a Dutch fashion designer. His designs are also worn by celebrities and royals and have appeared on red carpets and fashion shots all over the world and were published in magazines like Vogue, Harper's Bazaar and TV shows like America's Next Top Model.

== Biography ==
He launched his first own designs in 2002, during the Beaumonde Fashion Awards. This was followed by his own couture collection the year after. From then on, presenting his own couture collection has become an annual event. Bespoke dresses have been worn by Dutch and international celebrities, like Yolanthe Sneijder, Glennis Grace, Carly Steel and several princesses of the Dutch royal family at state occasions.

In 2007, Addy was invited to show his collection during the Altamoda Haute Couture Fashion Week in Rome, Italy. In September 2007 he presented his first Prêt a Porter collection in his showroom at Via Visconti di Modrone in Milan, Italy.

His special collection inspired by the paintings of Jheronimus Bosch, travelled with the designer to several countries. All the way from New York to Hongkong for shows.

== Celebrities ==
Addy van den Krommenacker is well known in The Netherlands for his evening gowns for red carpets, but after he had shown in several countries, also international celebrities found their way to Van den Krommenacker. In 2017, Laura Pausini chose the designer for her video clip recordings. In 2008, his collection was shown during the final runway show for the popular television show America's Next Top Model, which was aired in 130 countries all over the world. He also designed a dress for TV host Tyra Banks. He also created the Eurovision song contest dress for Dutch contestant Glennis Grace. In 2010 LPGA Pro golfer and model Anna Rawson wore a sequin dress on the cover of 'Golf Magazine for her' in the USA. Later that year he dressed Hollywood TV reporter April Sutton for the Oscars and the wife of Lost actor Henry Ian Cusick for the 62nd Prime Time Emmy Awards. Several international stars like Malika Sherawat and Carly Steel were wearing his dresses during the Academy Awards. He also dressed Courtney Love and Lady Victoria Hervey for the Cannes Film Festival. Also Susan Blakely and Sofia Milos are celebrities who have worn Addy's creations on the red carpet. His designs are worn during televised gala's in The Netherlands, like award shows.

== Wedding Dresses ==
Addy van den Krommenacker is known for his wedding dresses: his style is feminine with often delicate lace work and embroideries. Yolanthe Cabau van Kasbergen, the wife of footballer Wesley Sneijder, was wearing a salmon Addy dress covered with sequins on the evening of her wedding. In 2007, Addy designed a wedding dress for Truus van Gaal, wife of soccer trainer Louis van Gaal. Addy also designed the wedding dress for Stephanie Rijkaard, wife of footballer Frank Rijkaard. Addy's wedding dresses for television and musical star Chantal Janzen and Bettina Bakkum-Holwerda were included in the top 10 wedding dresses by the Dutch magazine Jan.

== Royal honours ==
Addy had been appointed by Queen Beatrix as Knight in the Order of Orange-Nassau.

After several designs for Princess Irene of the Netherlands, Princess Mabel of Orange-Nassau and Princess Aimée van Oranje and other members of the Dutch royal family, Addy had been asked to design the wedding gown for Princess Carolina of Bourbon-Parma, for which he was allowed to use the lace of the original wedding dress of her mother, Princess Irene, worn on her wedding day some 50 years ago. Carolina's grandmother, Queen Juliana of the Netherlands gave her that lace, of which Balmain created a wedding dress.

During the inauguration of King Willem-Alexander of the Netherlands on 30 April 2013, he designed dresses for Princess Margriet, Princess Irene, Princess Aimeé, Princess Annette and Princess Magarita of Bourbon-Parma.

== Awards ==
- 1988: Styling Best Dressed women of the Year, Sandra Reemer
- 2007: Look of the Year Award, Sicily
- 2008: Best International Designer, Rome
- 2009: Award Premio Posidone D'argento, Sicily
- 2011: Knight in the Order of Orange-Nassau
- 2015: Award of Excellence, Romania
- 2017: Excellence in Fashion, Novi Sad
- 2017: Premio Speciale Moda, Città Dei Sassi
- 2018: International Couture Award, Moda Movie, Calabria
