= Masters M60 5000 metres world record progression =

This is the progression of world record improvements of the 5000 metres M60 division of Masters athletics.

Key

Incomplete information Pending

| Hand | Auto | Athlete | Nationality | Birthdate | Age | Location | Date |
|---|---|---|---|---|---|---|---|
| 15:52.9 | | Steve Moneghetti | Australia | 26 September 1962 | 60 years, 86 days | Melbourne | 21 December 2022 |
| | 15:56.41 | Yoshitsugu Iwanaga | Japan | 19 July 1960 | 60 years, 118 days | Saga | 14 November 2020 |
| | 16:12.57 | Adriaan Heijdens | Netherlands | 17 November 1938 | 60 years, 228 days | Uden | 3 July 1999 |
| 16:24.0 | | Stephen James | Great Britain | 10 March 1938 | 60 years, 88 days | Ormskirk | 6 June 1998 |
| 16:31.2 | | Willem Ravensbergen | Netherlands | 26 June 1929 | 60 years, 94 days | | 28 September 1989 |
| 16:33.3 | | John Gilmour | Australia | 3 May 1919 | 61 years, 97 days | Helsinki | 8 August 1980 |
| 17:01.6 | | George McGrath | Australia | 1 December 1919 | 60 years, 127 days | Adelaide | 6 April 1980 |
