= Theodore J. van den Broek =

Dutch missionary (1783–1851)

Theodore J. van den Broek (5 November 1783 – 5 November 1851) was a Dutch Dominican Order missionary to the United States. He was known for his capacity for foreign languages, his community building efforts, and extensive work among several American Indian ethnic groups primarily in Wisconsin, amongst whom he was a missionary and physician. Though initially he worked alone, in the late 1840s he advertised work opportunities in for his Dutch countrymen in the Dutch Catholic newspaper De Tijd.

As a result of these advertisements, he is responsible for leading a group of 900 Dutch settlers, primarily Catholics from the vicinity of Uden to the Fox River canal in Wisconsin, where they settled a prosperous Dutch community in the area of Little Chute. He died in 1851 having spent 19 years in the United States.

== Life ==
The second child of Abraham van den Broek and Elisabeth de Meijne, he was born in Amsterdam, Netherlands in June 1784. His paternal grandparents were Abraham van den Broek and Alida Verhaar from Uden, North Brabant, Netherlands. He apparently spent time there as a youth. His parents were known to be wealthy, he was highly educated and he was fluent in six languages. He made his studies in Holland, was ordained in Germany in 1809, and was received into the Dominican Order in 1817. In 1819 he was appointed to Alkmaar, where he published "Sermons for all Sundays and Holidays".

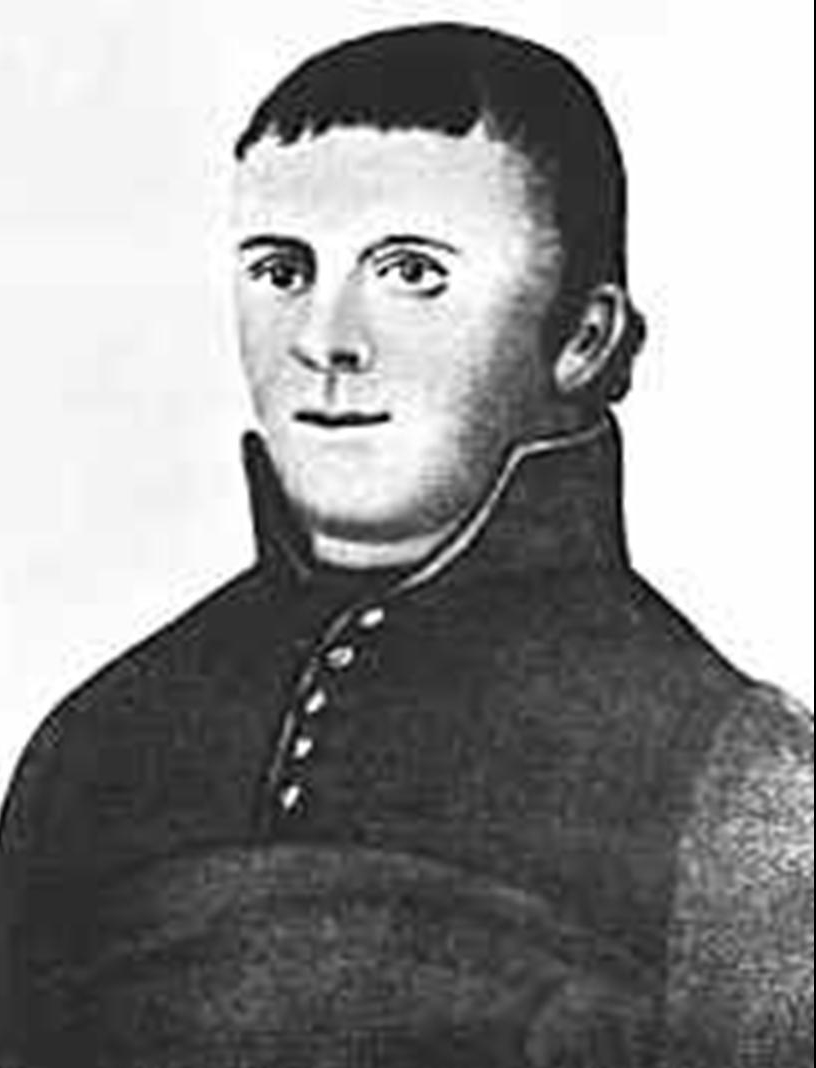
Theodore Van den Broek, before 1848

On 15 August 1832, with seven other missionaries, he arrived in Baltimore, and thence went to Cincinnati. He was 49 years old. The missionaries were sent to different places, and van den Broek eventually went to the convent of St. Rose in Kentucky. After a short stay at St. Rose he was removed to Somerset, Ohio.

While at Somerset, he met a member of the Grignon family, who were established near Green Bay. Hearing of the condition of the Native Americans in Michigan (now Wisconsin), he obtained permission from John Baptist Purcell, Archbishop of the Roman Catholic Archdiocese of Cincinnati to go to them, and arrived at Green Bay on 4 July 1834. He found there only ten Catholic families. He completed the church and priest's house begun by Samuel Charles Mazzuchelli, and devoted himself to the Indians during an epidemic of cholera, aided by two Sisters Clara and Theresa Bourdalou.

In Green Bay he again met with the Grignons, and probably through this contact he went to La Petite Chute in 1836. There he built the first church for the Menominee Indians, St. John Nepomucene, one of several he would establish in the area. In 1836, at the request of the Native Americans of Little Chute, he took up his residence with them. He taught them the alphabet and to read Frederic Baraga's prayer-books and catechisms. The following year he built a log church thirty by twenty-two feet and in 1839 he built an addition thereto of twenty feet.

He had no income outside of his own resources; he built his first church himself, with the aid of Native Americans. He was both priest and physician at Butte des Morts, Fort Winnebago, Fond du Lac, Prairie du Chien, Lake Poygan, Calumet, and the Native American village on the Milwaukee River. He taught the use of tools and agriculture, and with Native American help he built a church seventy feet long, which he dedicated to St. John Nepomucene.

As the mission at Green Bay was for some time without a resident priest, van den Broek frequently said Mass on Sundays at each place, walking the intervening distance of twenty-two miles. He made journeys of two hundred miles, to minister to Menominee and Ho-Chunk tribes. In Green Bay van den Broek also met Morgan Lewis Martin, who was in charge of the local canal project. There van den Broek purchased land, which he later hoped to sell. In that same year, 1836, the Menominees signed the "Treaty of the Cedars" which required them to give up title to the local land and move beyond the Wolf River to the west. This deprived him of most of his constituents at Little Chute.

Between 1836 and 1844 he converted and baptized over eight hundred Native Americans. He also began to write letters about the area to groups in the Netherlands. The letters appeared in the Roman Catholic paper, De Tijd (The Times) beginning in 1843.

A drawing of St. John Nepomucene about 1851. The church was soon razed for the present structure.

In 1847 his parents died, and van den Broek went back to the Netherlands to settle his parents' estate. After having obtained a priest to temporarily replace him, he sailed for Europe, arriving at Amsterdam on 13 August 1847. The estate settlement was not very beneficial and he found himself nearly destitute. As St. John Nepomucene parishioners were significantly reduced after the Treaty of the Cedars, he used the trip as an opportunity to again write in De Tijd, advertising the mission, the land at La Petite Chute and employment opportunities associated with the Fox River Canal, which included free passage to America for workers. The results were immediate and, by 1848, three wooden sailing vessels left for America carrying van den Broek and about 900 Dutch settlers.

On November 5, 1851, van den Broek died at age 68, leaving behind a prospering Dutch community at Little Chute. He is buried in the present St. John Nepomucene Church.
