= Little Chute, Wisconsin =

- Village
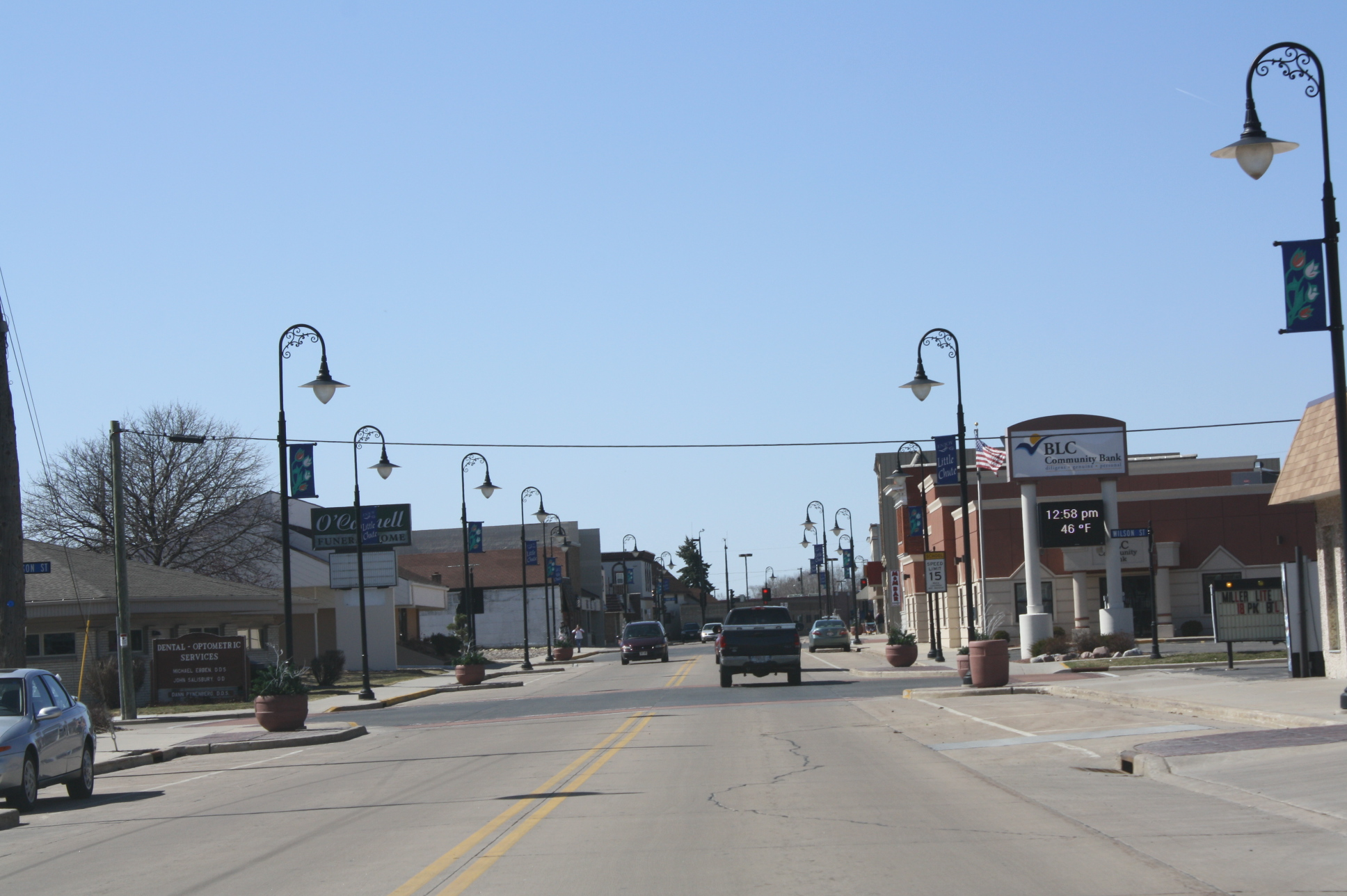
- Downtown Little Chute

- Location of Little Chute in Outagamie County, Wisconsin
- Coordinates: 44°17′3″N 88°18′49″W
- Country: United States
- State: Wisconsin
- County: Outagamie
- Established: February 1, 1899

Area
  - Total: 6.78 sq mi (17.56 km^{2})
  - Land: 6.45 sq mi (16.71 km^{2})
  - Water: 0.33 sq mi (0.85 km^{2})
- Elevation: 732 ft (223 m)

Population (2020)
  - Total: 11,619
  - Density: 1,801/sq mi (695.3/km^{2})
- Time zone: UTC-6 (Central (CST))
  - Summer (DST): UTC-5 (CDT)
- ZIP code: 54140
- Area code: 920
- FIPS code: 55-44950
- GNIS feature ID: 1568226
- Website: www.littlechutewi.org

Little Chute is a village in Outagamie County, Wisconsin, United States. The population was 11,619 at the 2020 census; the Census Bureau estimated it at 11,800 as of July 1, 2025. It is immediately east of the city of Appleton and runs along the Fox River. It is a part of the Appleton, Wisconsin Metropolitan Statistical Area.

The town was originally established as a trading post by French explorers who called it "La Petite Chute" (Little Chute). In the mid-19th century, it was settled by Dutch Catholic immigrants from North Brabant, led initially by the Dominican Missionary Theodore J. van den Broek from Uden. The town became an outpost of Dutch Catholic immigrants in the Midwest. Little Chute is home to a full-scale Dutch-style working windmill, which has become a tourist attraction.

Prior to European exploration it is likely the Mississippian culture tribe, the Oneota lived in the area. The Oneota are believed to be the ancestors of the Winnebago or Ho-Chunk tribe. A historical marker near Little Chute commemorates the Treaty of the Cedars, a treaty which ceded 4 million acres of Native American land to the US government.

== History ==
While sharing in the history of northeast Wisconsin, Little Chute has been influenced by two unique factors: the rapids and portages along the Fox River and the coming of Dutch-Catholic settlers in 1848. Prior to and during the early European settlement, the Fox-Wisconsin Waterway to the Mississippi River system was one of the most heavily traveled routes between the Great Lakes and the Mississippi River. Afterward canals and locks were built to circumvent these rapids. The actual construction of these features provided employment to settlers, the Dutch among them, although the canal system never proved to be a great success. In 1836, the Treaty of the Cedars was signed near Little Chute by the Menominee Indians, which ceded to The United States "Four million acres between the Fox, Wolf and Menominee Rivers".

=== Native Americans ===
There is little evidence today of the earliest Native American communities in the area. Prior to the European exploration it is likely the Mississippian culture tribe, the Oneota, lived in the area. The Oneota are believed to be the ancestors of the Winnebago or Ho-Chunk people; this has yet to be conclusively demonstrated. Regardless, the Ho-Chunk dominated the area just as the French were first appearing in the St Lawrence area far to the east. The Illinois tribe was generally far to the south; the Menominee tribe was just to the north. The Ho-Chunk maintained reasonably good relations with both tribes, although there were several battles with the Illinois. While the French had yet to settle in the area, their presence to the east started a chain reaction of tribal migration. The Huron, Ottawa, Potawatomi, and other eastern tribes all had encounters with the Ho-Chunk. The Sauk and Meskwaki peoples, originally in the St. Lawrence Valley, migrated first to southeastern Michigan. The Meskwaki (Renard in French) called themselves the Meshkwahkihaki and were also known as the Outagamie by the French. The Sac and Meskwaki were uprooted again by eastern tribes and began to arrive in the Fox River Valley in the late 17th century. The Sac and Fox eventually drove most of the Ho-Chunk from the area. When the first French settlers appeared, they named the river after the Fox. The county which today includes Little Chute was to be named Outagamie.

Painting of the Little Chute Lock and Dam in 1856 commissioned by Morgan L. Martin. Drawn by Samuel M. Brookes and Thomas H. Stevenson, it was part of a group of paintings of river town sites and locks for the Fox-Wisconsin River Improvement Co. The view is approximately from the present day Doyle Park. The first St. John Nepomucene Church and School is on the extreme right.

The series of rapids along the Fox River near Little Chute necessitated canoe portages. By the time the French settlement started in the early 18th century, the Sac had essentially set up toll stations along the Fox-Wisconsin Waterway, including the rapids at Little Chute. The French, outraged at the impact on trade, launched a series of attacks on the Sac, culminating in the Fox Wars, which drove them out of the area by 1742. The power vacuum created by the departure of most of the Ho-Chunk, the Sac and the Fox allowed the Menominee to briefly dominate the area. The Menominee set up a village, Ookicitiming (“causeway” in Menominee) near present-day Little Chute.

=== First European settlement ===
The first Europeans to the area were the French. Jean Nicolet reached the Fox River at Green Bay in 1634 and set up a trading post. Explorers Father Jacques Marquette and Louis Joliet passed through the area in 1673, following the canoe route to the Mississippi. As early as 1760, the families of Augustin and Charles Grignon, French Canadian Métis, established a fur trade post along the rapids. While French influence waned, it can still be seen in local place names, particularly waterways. Locally the three major rapids on the Fox were named “La Grand Kauklin” (near Grignon's trading post at present day Kaukauna), “La Petite Chute” (present day Little Chute) and “La Grand Chute” (still the name of the adjoining township).

The French maintained a presence in the area until the end of the French and Indian War in 1763. The area switched to British control until the end of the Revolutionary War in 1781. The Americans nominally controlled the area although the British continued to maintain a presence until the end of the War of 1812 in 1814. In 1787, the area became part of the American Northwest Territory. In succession the area became part of Indiana, Illinois, Michigan, and finally, in 1836, Wisconsin Territories. Statehood was reached in 1848.

=== Father Van den Broek and the first Dutch settlers ===
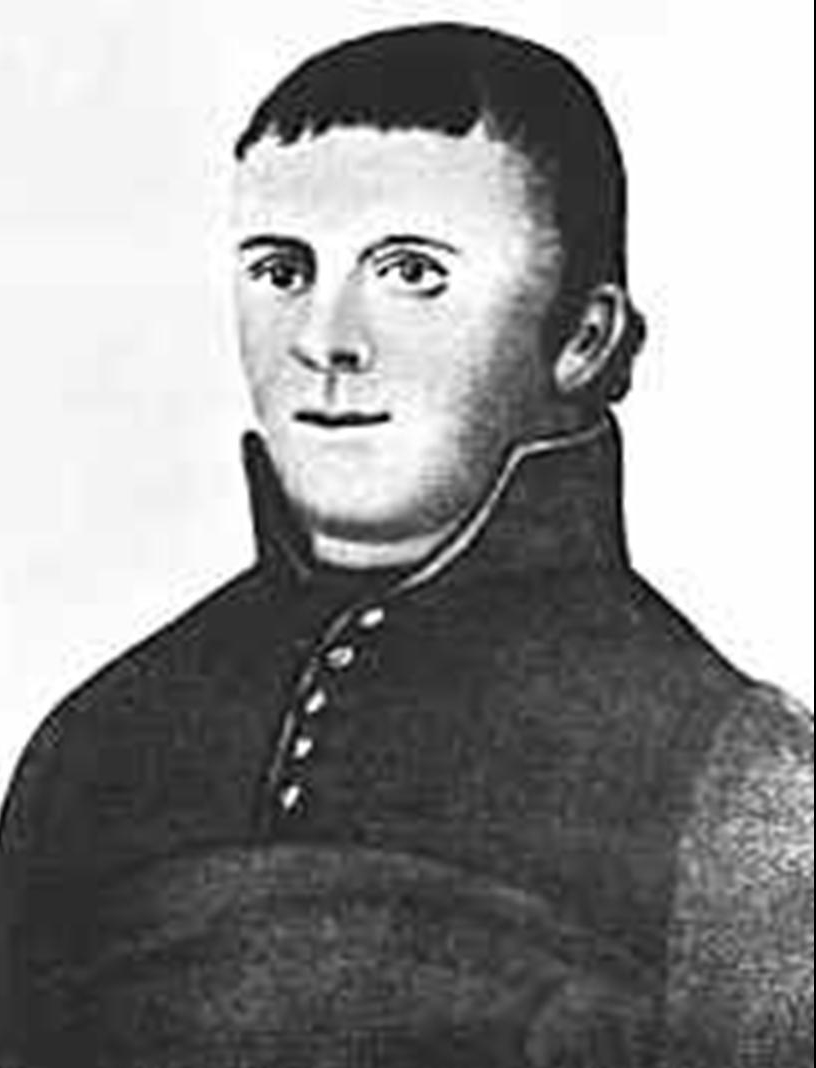
Father Theodore Van den Broek, before 1848

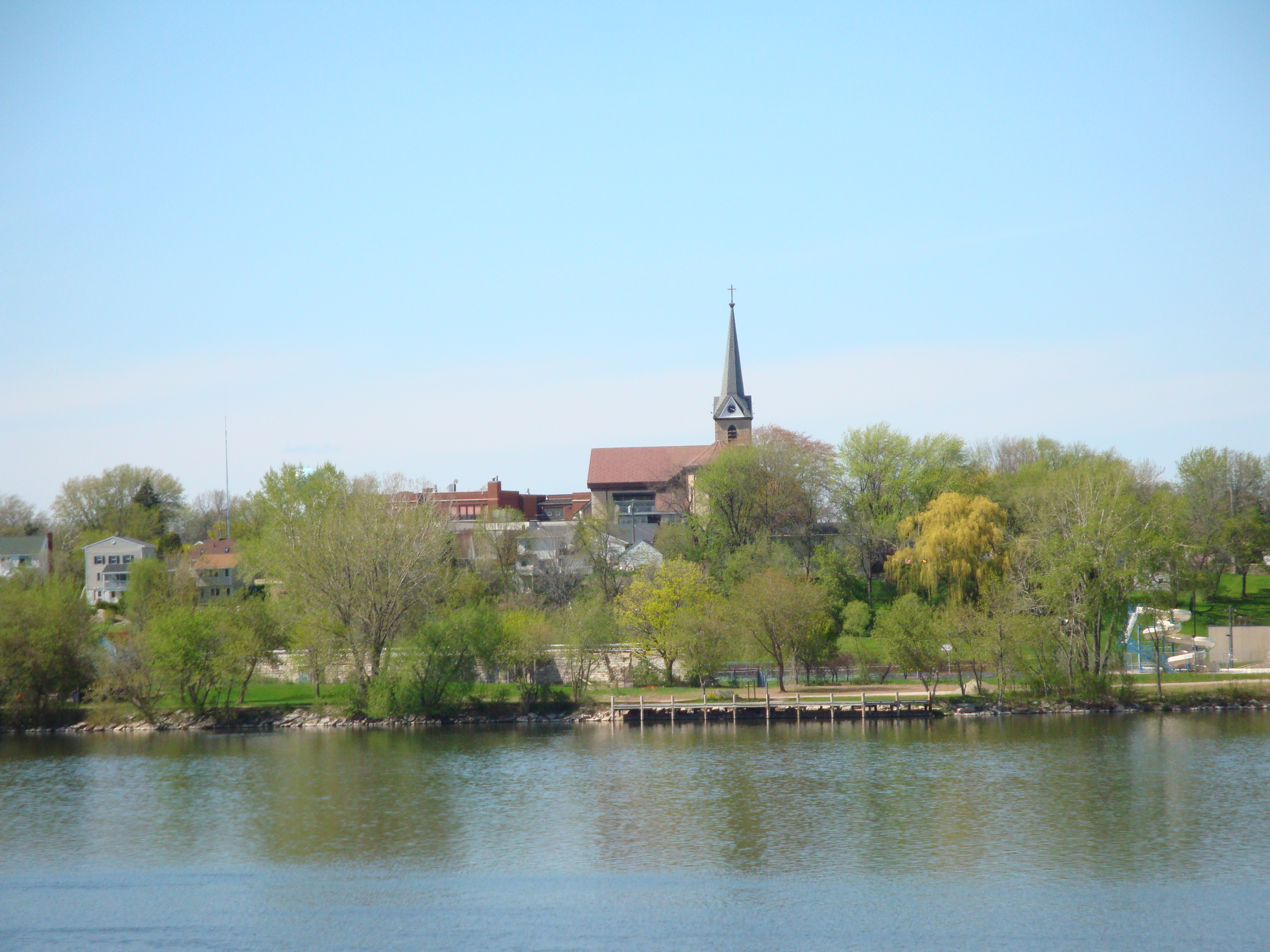
Saint John Catholic Church

The singular person in the establishment of Little Chute as a Catholic Dutch-American community was a Dominican missionary: Father Theodore J. van den Broek. Born to wealthy parents in Amsterdam, Netherlands in June 1784, he had relatives in Uden, North Brabant, Netherlands and apparently spent time there as a youth. He was highly educated and fluent in six languages. He was ordained a priest in 1808 and joined the Dominican Order in 1817. After a period as a pastor in the Netherlands, he left in 1832 at the age of 49 to join other missionary priests at Cincinnati, Ohio. In 1834 he was ordered to Green Bay to an established Dominican mission. In Green Bay he met the Grignon family, and probably through this contact he went to La Petite Chute in 1836. There he built the first church for the Menominee Indians, St. John Nepomucene, one of several he would establish in the area. Father Van den Broek also met Morgan Lewis Martin, who was in charge of the local canal project. Father Van den Broek purchased land in the area which he later hoped to sell. In that same year, 1836, the Menominees signed the “Treaty of the Cedars” which required them to give up title to the local land and move beyond the Wolf River to the west.

Father Van den Broek began to write letters about the area to groups in the Netherlands. The letters appeared in the Roman Catholic paper, De Tijd (The Times) beginning in 1843. In the summer of 1847 Father Van den Broek went back to the Netherlands to settle his parents’ estate. The settlement was not very beneficial and he found himself nearly destitute. As St. John Nepomucene parishioners were significantly reduced after the Treaty of the Cedars, he used the trip as an opportunity to again write in De Tijd, advertising the mission, the land at La Petite Chute and employment opportunities associated with the Fox River Canal, which included free passage to America for workers. The results were immediate and, by 1848, three wooden sailing vessels called "barks" or "barque" (small three-masted sailing ships), the Libra, the Maria Magdalena and the America, had been booked for passage to the east coast of the United States. Approximately 918 Dutch Catholic immigrants were on the three boats. Most of the early emigrants were from villages near Uden, including Zeeland, Boekel, Mill, Oploo and Gemert. The Dutch economy of the era was stagnant and much of the motivation to emigrate was economic. The emigrants were not poor, as the cost of passage, expenses and land purchase in Wisconsin would have been substantial. They were not, however, affluent and many would have been risking most of their wealth on the chance of economic improvement. There were also political pressures at the time that favored mass emigrations of Catholics.

Typical passage to La Petite Chute included crossing the Atlantic from Rotterdam to New York City, a train trip from there to Albany, a train or Erie Canal-barge trip across New York state to Buffalo, steamship travel through the Great Lakes and Green Bay to the head of the Fox River at Green Bay and finally a 30-mile, ox-cart trip to the mission at La Petite Chute. The first group from Rotterdam arrived on May 22, 1848, led by a Franciscan missionary, Fr Adrianus D. Godthard. Father Van den Broek's group, held up by an ice jam on Lake Michigan, arrived on June 10, 1848. The emigrants discovered not plowed fields and a village but forested land, being somewhat misled by wording of the De Tijd advertisements: the word “acres” was translated as akkers, meaning cultivated land. There was also not enough good land in Father Van den Broek's holdings for all the emigrants. There was a resort to drawing straws, with the winners naturally picking the best lots. Many of the others—led by Cornelis van de Heij, a farmer from Zeeland, and Father Godthard—left to form the village of Holland (usually referred to locally as “Hollandtown”) rather than buying the remainder of Father Van den Broek's land. There were other Europeans, mainly French and Irish emigrants, already established at La Petite Chute, now also known by its semi-anglicized name of “Little Chute.” A few Native Americans still lived in the area.

=== Later Dutch immigration ===
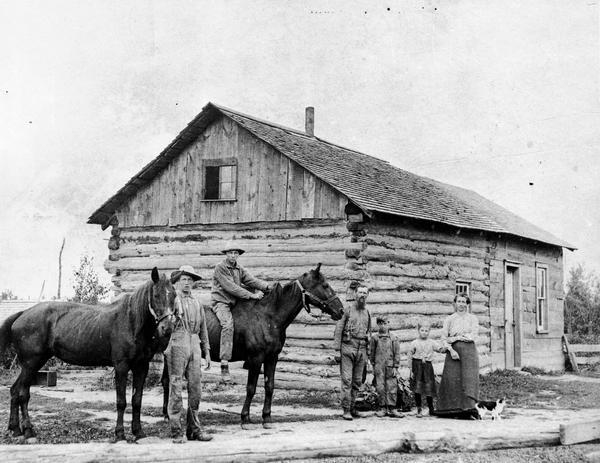
Typical Dutch homestead, c. 1855

Despite the hardships, including the death of Father Van den Broek in 1851, the village prospered. Waves of Catholic Dutch emigrants followed from all over the Netherlands, with whole families and neighborhoods moving to join family and friends already established in Little Chute, Hollandtown, and the outlying farming communities. It is estimated that, by 1927, as many as 40,000 Dutch Roman Catholics had immigrated to the United States—an average rate of 10 per week for 80 years. While many headed for cities or individual farms across the country, Little Chute and the surrounding area represented the largest concentration of Catholic immigrants.

From the start, St. John Nepomucene Church served as a focal point, although other churches would soon spring up in the other communities. The first settlers would have devoted all energies to clearing land, planting, building small homes and barns, fencing and raising livestock. The private Fox River Canal was a failure. The State "Fox and Wisconsin Improvement Company" took over operations in 1850 and finished the canal and adjoining dam by 1856. Railways approached from the south and steamship lines were established on Lakes Michigan and Winnebago. The 16 feet of water head at La Petite Chute and other falls was used for mills, a practice that continues. Little Chute post office was established in 1849. In 1898 the fiftieth anniversary of the founding was commemorated and the surviving "48'ers" recognized. In 1898, residents of La Petite Chute petitioned the State of Wisconsin for incorporation as the Village of Little Chute, which was formally granted on March 8, 1899.

While there are several other Dutch American cities—Oostburg, Wisconsin; Pella, Iowa; Orange City, Iowa; and Holland, Michigan—these were largely settled by Protestants. Little Chute and some surrounding area was largely settled by Catholics. By the early twentieth century it was the largest Catholic Dutch community in the United States. Little Chute remained a Dutch-speaking community—known locally as "speaking Hollander"—into the twentieth century. As late as 1898, church sermons and event announcements were in Dutch. Dutch newspapers continued in the area—mainly in De Pere by Catholic clergymen—were published up until World War I. Speaking Dutch as a first language was common in the area among second and third generation even as late as World War II. The Dutch festival of Sinterklaas was celebrated as "St Nick’s Day" (December 6). This practice continues in many households today. St. John Nepomucene was the primary educational institution with the local public high school not opening until 1966.

=== Present day ===
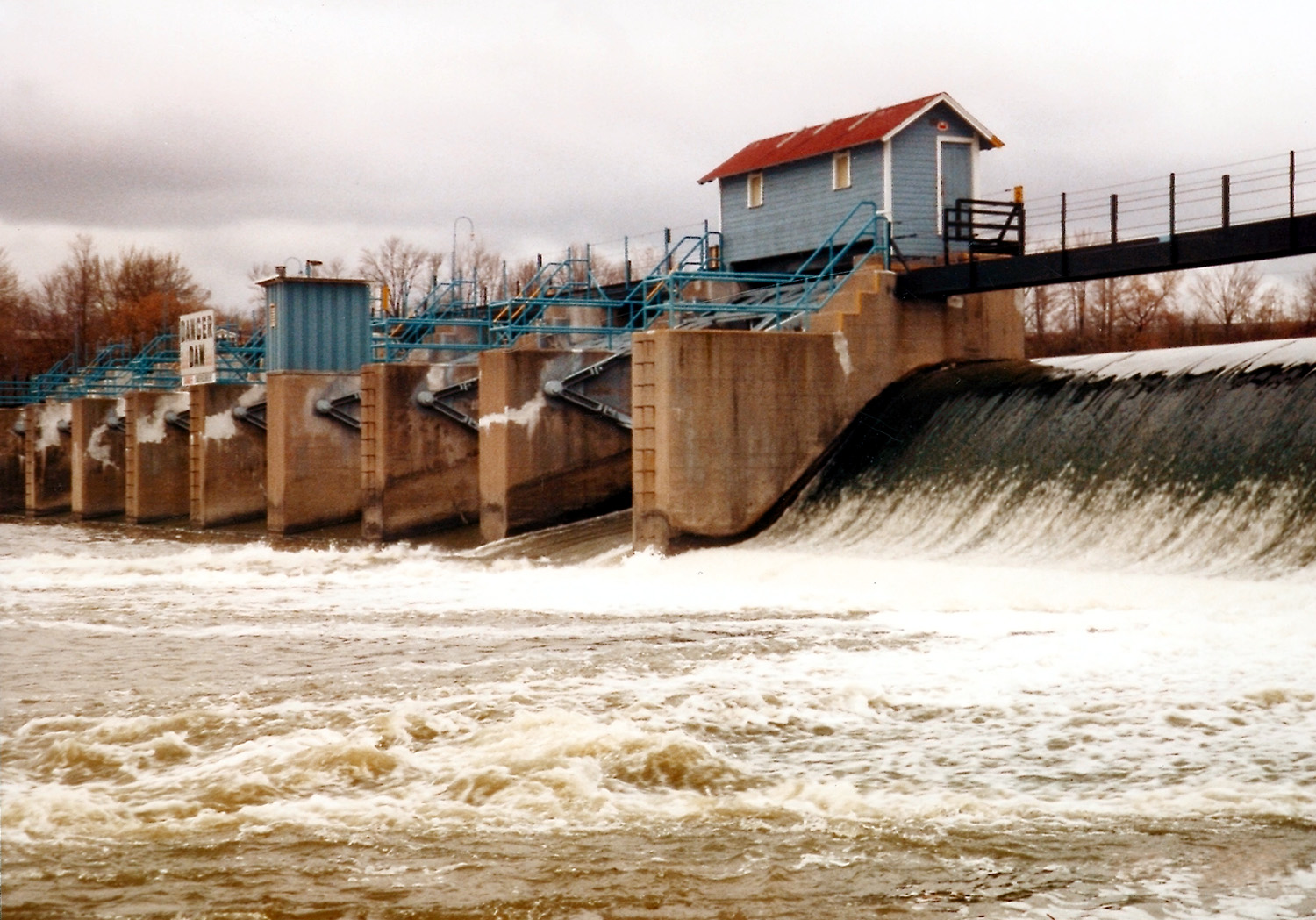
One of four dams on the Fox River in Little Chute

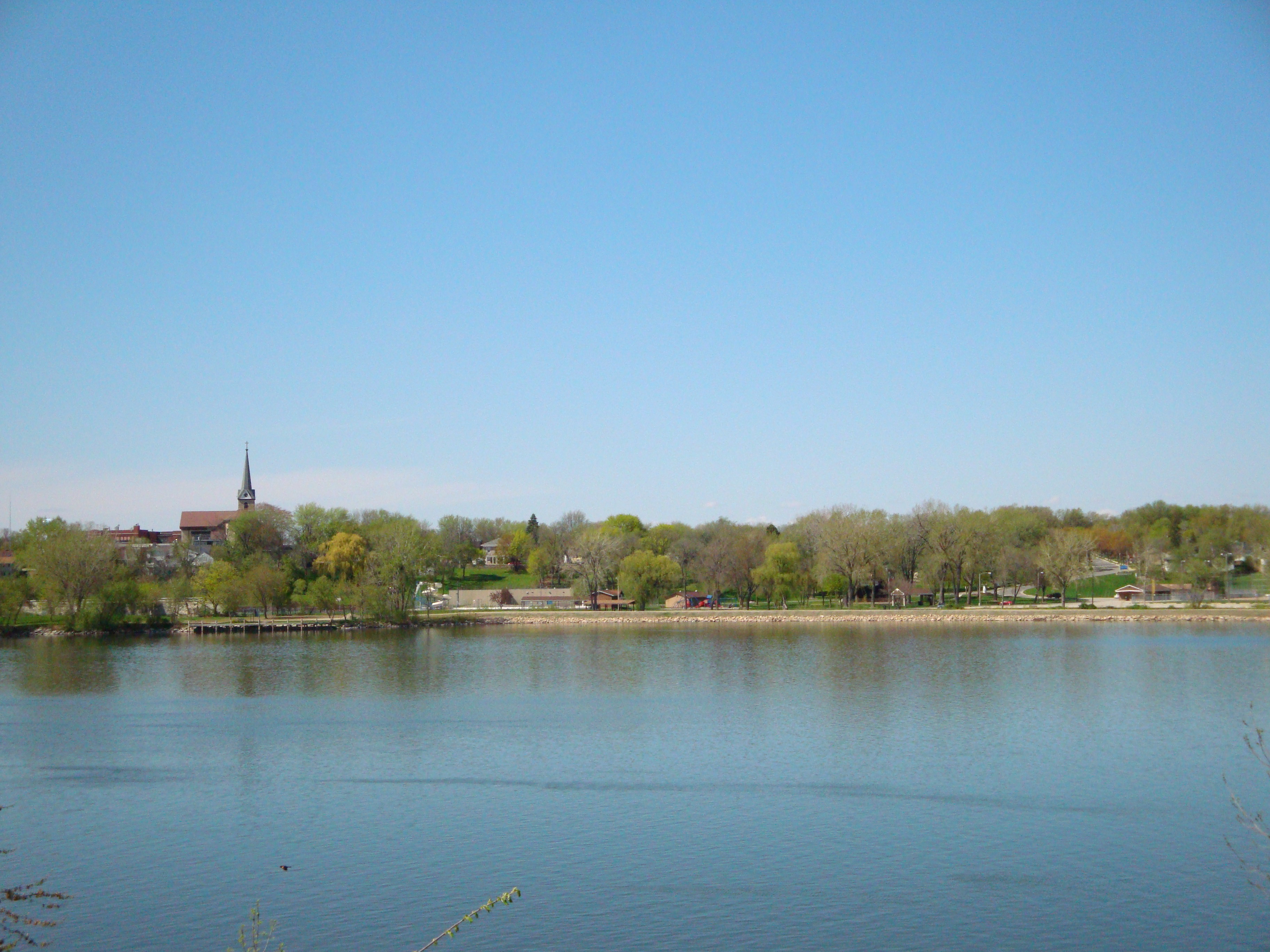
Doyle and Island parks in Little Chute, as seen from the Fox River

Little Chute celebrated the Dutch festival of Kermis annually from 1981 until 2015. The festival was reinstituted in 1981 after a long hiatus dating back to the early twentieth century, and is possibly the only such named event in the United States. St. John Nepomucene is a thriving parish with recent additions to the church and elementary school.

Little Chute has a full-scale authentic working Dutch windmill operated by Little Chute Windmill, a non-profit organization. The Little Chute Windmill and Van Asten Visitor Center, completed in 2013, serves as a museum and tourist attraction that promotes the history and Dutch heritage of the community.

The Fox River Navigational System Authority restored and operates the system of Lower Fox River locks between Lake Winnebago and Green Bay, including the locks at Little Chute in Doyle Park. The authority announced in 2015 that its ten-year, $14.5 million restoration of the system's locks was complete, and it lists the Little Chute guard lock and lock as open to navigation since 2016.

While some homes are decorated with windmills and other symbols of Dutch culture, the use of the Dutch language and day-to-day culture has all but discontinued. A tradition from North Brabant, that happens every year in Little Chute is "De Schut" and is a copy of "Koningsschieten" in the province North Brabant in the Netherlands.

The non-profit organization Fox-Wisconsin Heritage Parkway is rehabilitating the Little Chute Lock Tender's House with volunteer labor and private donations. It will be restored to its 1930s character and will become a vacation rental. The house is on the National Register of Historic Places.

== Geography ==
Little Chute is located at 44°17′03″N 88°18′49″W (44.284087, −88.313629).

According to the United States Census Bureau, the village has a total area of 6.78 square miles (17.56 km^{2}), of which 6.45 square miles (16.71 km^{2}) is land and 0.33 square miles (0.85 km^{2}) is water.

Little Chute is the largest village in Outagamie County.

== Demographics ==
Historical population
Census	Pop.	Note	%±
1890	380		—
1900	944		148.4%
1910	1,354		43.4%
1920	2,017		49.0%
1930	2,833		40.5%
1940	3,360		18.6%
1950	4,152		23.6%
1960	5,099		22.8%
1970	5,522		8.3%
1980	7,907		43.2%
1990	9,207		16.4%
2000	10,476		13.8%
2010	10,449		−0.3%
2020	11,619		11.2%
U.S. Decennial Census

=== Recent estimates ===
The Census Bureau estimated the village's population at 11,800 as of July 1, 2025, a 1.4% increase from the 2020 estimates base.

According to American Community Survey estimates for 2020–2024, there were 4,997 households with an average of 2.34 persons per household. The median household income was $87,538 and the per capita income was $47,249 (in 2024 dollars); 5.7% of the population was below the poverty line. The owner-occupied housing rate was 58.3%, the median value of owner-occupied homes was $245,800, and the median gross rent was $1,150. Among residents aged 25 and over, 94.1% were high school graduates and 28.2% held a bachelor's degree or higher. About 2.2% of residents were foreign-born, and 5.6% of those aged five and over spoke a language other than English at home.

=== 2020 census ===
As of the 2020 census, Little Chute had a population of 11,619. The median age was 36.3 years. 22.2% of residents were under the age of 18 and 15.2% of residents were 65 years of age or older. For every 100 females, there were 98.5 males, and for every 100 females age 18 and over, there were 97.1 males age 18 and over.

99.9% of residents lived in urban areas, while 0.1% lived in rural areas.

There were 4,944 households in Little Chute, of which 27.5% had children under the age of 18 living in them. Of all households, 47.0% were married-couple households, 19.4% were households with a male householder and no spouse or partner present, and 24.1% were households with a female householder and no spouse or partner present. About 29.1% of all households were made up of individuals, and 10.0% had someone living alone who was 65 years of age or older.

There were 5,130 housing units, of which 3.6% were vacant. The homeowner vacancy rate was 1.0% and the rental vacancy rate was 3.7%.

Racial composition as of the 2020 census
Race	Number	Percent
White	10,421	89.7%
Black or African American	118	1.0%
American Indian and Alaska Native	98	0.8%
Asian	226	1.9%
Native Hawaiian and Other Pacific Islander	3	0.0%
Some other race	208	1.8%
Two or more races	545	4.7%
Hispanic or Latino (of any race)	545	4.7%

=== 2010 census ===
As of the census of 2010, there were 10,449 people, 4,207 households, and 2,848 families residing in the village. The population density was 2,025.0 inhabitants per square mile (781.9/km^{2}). There were 4,376 housing units at an average density of 848.1 per square mile (327.5/km^{2}). The racial makeup of the village was 94.8% White, 0.7% African American, 0.7% Native American, 0.9% Asian, 1.5% from other races, and 1.3% from two or more races. Hispanic or Latino people of any race were 3.1% of the population.

There were 4,207 households, of which 32.5% had children under the age of 18 living with them, 53.1% were married couples living together, 10.5% had a female householder with no husband present, 4.1% had a male householder with no wife present, and 32.3% were non-families. 25.5% of all households were made up of individuals, and 8.4% had someone living alone who was 65 years of age or older. The average household size was 2.46 and the average family size was 2.97.

The median age in the village was 37 years. 24.5% of residents were under the age of 18; 8.7% were between the ages of 18 and 24; 27.5% were from 25 to 44; 27% were from 45 to 64; and 12.3% were 65 years of age or older. The gender makeup of the village was 49.6% male and 50.4% female.

=== 2000 census ===
As of the census of 2000, there were 10,476 people, 3,878 households, and 2,803 families residing in the village. The population density was 2,538.0 per square mile (979.9/km^{2}). There were 3,956 housing units at an average density of 958.4 per square mile (370.0/km^{2}). The racial makeup of the village was 96.96% White, 0.10% African American, 0.54% Native American, 0.77% Asian, 0.03% Pacific Islander, 0.85% from other races, and 0.74% from two or more races. Hispanic or Latino people of any race were 1.67% of the population.

There were 3,878 households, out of which 38.3% had children under the age of 18 living with them, 59.7% were married couples living together, 9.2% had a female householder with no husband present, and 27.7% were non-families. 22.1% of all households were made up of individuals, and 7.7% had someone living alone who was 65 years of age or older. The average household size was 2.68 and the average family size was 3.17.

In the village, the population was spread out, with 29.1% under the age of 18, 8.6% from 18 to 24, 32.1% from 25 to 44, 19.8% from 45 to 64, and 10.4% who were 65 years of age or older. The median age was 33 years. For every 100 females, there were 95.9 males. For every 100 females age 18 and over, there were 93.2 males.

The median income for a household in the village was $49,500, and the median income for a family was $57,090. Males had a median income of $39,019 versus $24,579 for females. The per capita income for the village was $21,181. About 5.0% of families and 6.0% of the population were below the poverty line, including 11.3% of those under age 18 and 3.6% of those age 65 or over.

== Transportation ==
The Tri-County Expressway (Wisconsin Highway 441) runs on the west side of the village. Interstate 41 runs on the north side and links the village with Green Bay to the north and Appleton, Oshkosh, and Milwaukee to the south. Bus service is operated by Valley Transit. Appleton International Airport provides air service for Little Chute.

The village of Little Chute is responsible for the maintenance of just over 53 miles of roadway.

== Education ==
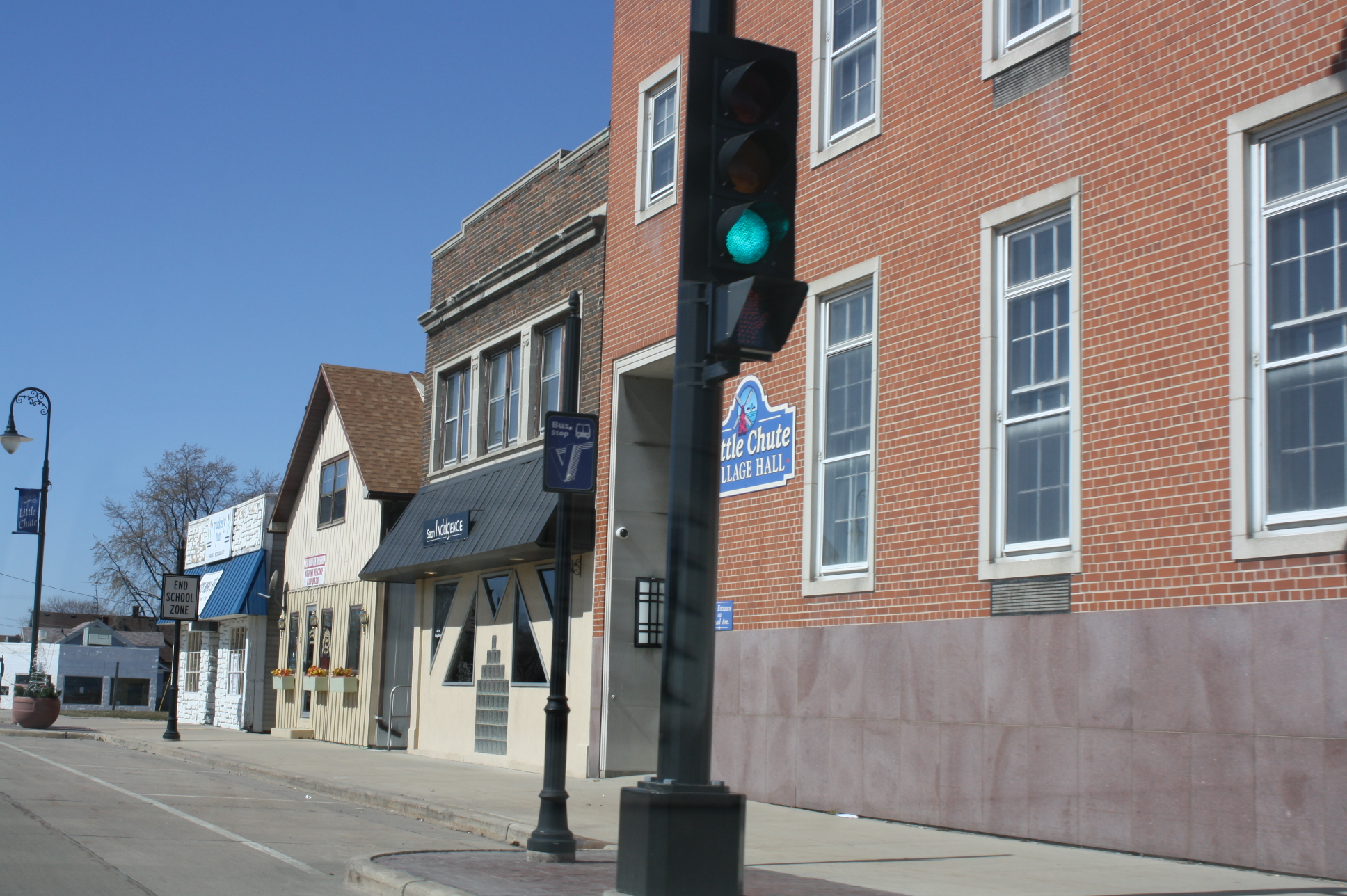
Village hall

Little Chute has both a public and private school system: St. John's serves grades K–8, and public schools serve K–12. The superintendent of the Little Chute School District is Heidi Schmidt. Grades 5–12 of the public school (Little Chute High School) are located in separate areas of the same building.

== Religion ==
St. Luke Lutheran Church, affiliated with the Wisconsin Evangelical Lutheran Synod (WELS), is in Little Chute.

== Notable people ==
- Clarence Currie, baseball player
- Johnny Van Cuyk, baseball player
- William N. Vander Loop, Wisconsin State Representative
- J. H. M. Wigman, mayor of Green Bay, Wisconsin

=== Fictional characters ===
- Amanda Ripley, fictional protagonist of Alien: Isolation. Little Chute is also the final resting place of Amanda and her mother, Alien film series protagonist Ellen Ripley.
- Mike Nelson, main character played by actor and comedian Michael J. Nelson in the American television series Mystery Science Theater 3000 1993–1999
