= Kobus van der Schlossen =

Dutch thief (??–1695)

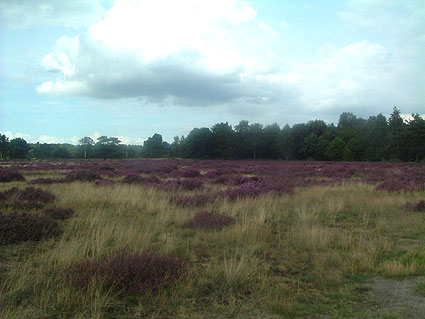
Slabroek

Kobus (or Jacobus) van der Schlossen (died 1695) was a late-seventeenth century Dutch thief who features prominently in folktales from the North Brabant region. After serving as a soldier in the many wars which left the Netherlands in turmoil, he joined a gang of ex-soldiers called de zwartmakers (lit. 'the detractors'). With his robber band De Zwarte Bende he made his home in the vast and impenetrable Slabroek forests near Uden. Eventually he was captured in Uden and imprisoned in Ravenstein Castle (since demolished). He was hanged in 1695 at the gallows of the Lordship of Ravenstein in Velp. Allegedly, 20,000 spectators came to witness the execution.

Stories were told about his miraculous escapes from the forces of law. De Brobbelbies, an area of Slabroek which still exists, received its name from one of these stories. One day, as the story goes, Kobus accidentally ran into some law-officers in the woods. When he found he could not outrun them he jumped into a pond and hid by morphing into a bulrush (called Bies in Dutch). Because of the magical transformation the water started bubbling (brobbelen; hence Brobbelbies).

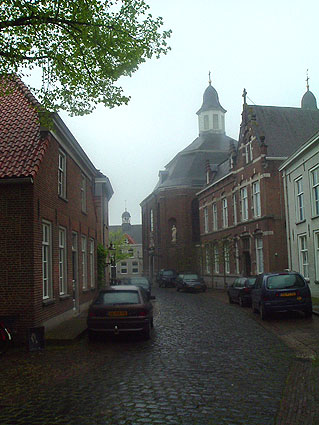
Ravenstein

== Sources ==
- Reggie Naus, Zwartmakerij in het land van Ravenstein: de Geschiedenis van Jacobus van der Schlossen, 2006.
