= Carly Steel =

British television presenter, actress and producer

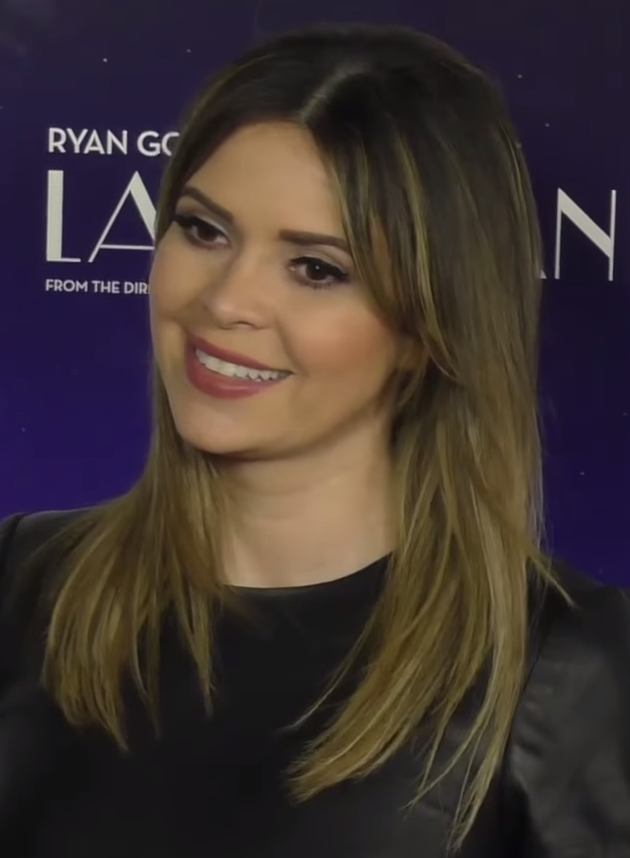
- Steel in 2016
- Born: Lanark, United Kingdom
- Known for: Entertainment Tonight, The Insider, The Bold and the Beautiful, The Brits Are Coming

Carly Steel is a British television presenter, actress and producer.

Steel hosts CBS's Entertainment Tonight, The Insider and TV Guide Network. She has appeared in several feature films including Unstoppable and Mortdecai, and has made television appearances such as on ABC's Castle, CBS's We Are Men, The Exes, Hand of God and The Bold and the Beautiful.

== Early life and education ==
Steel was born in Lanarkshire, Scotland, attended Hutchesons' Grammar School in Glasgow, and pursued her law degree at Durham University, earning a First Class Honors degree.

Steel graduated from Durham at the age of 20 and moved to New York to work at Vogue. She then relocated to Los Angeles to work in television.

== Career ==
=== Reporting ===
Carly Steel mainly conducts celebrity interviews, having begun her on-air reporting for TV Guide Network (now TVGN) in 2008, alongside The Bachelor host Chris Harrison. Her interview with Adam Lambert was featured on ABC's 20/20. She hosted TV Guide Network and KTLA's coverage of the wedding of Prince William and Catherine Middleton, and contributed to Good Morning America. She has since covered events such as the Academy Awards, Golden Globe Awards, Grammy Awards, SAG Awards, Daytime Emmy Awards as well as the Cannes Film Festival and Sundance Film Festival.

In 2011 Steel hosted the American Music Awards pre-show on ABC for Dick Clark Productions with former NSYNC member Lance Bass, and again the following four years.

Steel also began anchoring live red carpet shows from high-profile movie premieres with Yahoo! Movies and NowLive.com. She has also presented at the Prism Awards which airs on FX and hosted the Entertainment Industry Council's annual Washington DC Showcase. She hosted the Hollyshorts Film Festival opening night gala at Grauman's Chinese Theatre in Hollywood and was the official red carpet host of the Hollywood Film Awards for Dick Clark Productions. In 2013 Steel began working as a special correspondent for The Insider on CBS.

In 2014, Steel began working as a correspondent for Entertainment Tonight on CBS. For said show, she hosted the premiere of Mission: Impossible – Rogue Nation, during which Times Square was closed to the public.

=== Acting ===
Steel made her feature film debut in He's Just Not That Into You, and had a recurring role on CBS's The Bold and the Beautiful between 2008 and 2009.

In 2010 Steel appeared in Unstoppable as the helicopter news reporter. In 2015 she appeared in the Hallmark Channel film Romantically Speaking. Steel has also guest starred on ABC's Castle, CBS's We Are Men and Extant, and starred in the feature films Mortdecai, Dumbbells, The Brits Are Coming and Zoe Gone, released on Lifetime.

== Filmography ==
=== Films ===
- 2009 - He's Just Not That Into You as Party Girl #2
- 2010 - Unstoppable as Female Reporter in Helicopter
- 2012- Stripped as Elena Fox
- 2012 - Two Jacks as Madeline
- 2013 - The Adventures of Don Juan and Don Tu as Henchwoman Sandra (short film)
- 2013 - Malibu Horror Story as News Reporter
- 2014 - Dumbbells as Reporter
- 2014 - Zoe Gone as Mary Montgomery
- 2014 - Mortdecai as Mrs. Krampf
- 2014 - Romantically Speaking as Bethany
- 2018 - The Con is On

=== Television ===
- 2014 - Hit the Floor as Reporter
- 2008-2013 - Hollywood 411 as Host
- 2008 - The Fashion Team as Correspondent
- 2009-2012 - TV Guide Countdown to the Academy Awards as Host
- 2009-2013 - TV Guide Network Academy Awards Red Carpet as Host
- 2008 – 2009 - The Bold and the Beautiful as Reporter (#1.5677, #1.5464, #1.5252)
- 2009 - Hollyscoop as Correspondent
- 2010 - Private Chefs of Beverly Hills as herself
- 2011 - HBR as Reporter
- 2011 - Nail Files as herself
- 2011 - Culture Click as Correspondent (Make-up, Best of Culture Click)
- 2011 - Good Morning America as Contributor
- 2011 - KTLA Morning News as Correspondent
- 2011 – 2013 - American Music Awards as Red Carpet Host
- 2012-2013 - Annual PRISM Showcase as herself/Presenter
- 2013 - The Rachel Zoe Project as herself (Season 5, episode 4, Zoe Much to Do, Zoe Little Time)
- 2013 - We Are Men as British Nurse ("We Are Wingmen" season 1, episode 5)
- 2013 - Castle as TV Reporter (season 6, episode 11)
- 2013 - Showbiz Tonight as herself
- 2013-2014 - The Insider as a Correspondent
- 2014 - Anger Management as Fiona
