= Uden =

- Town and former municipality
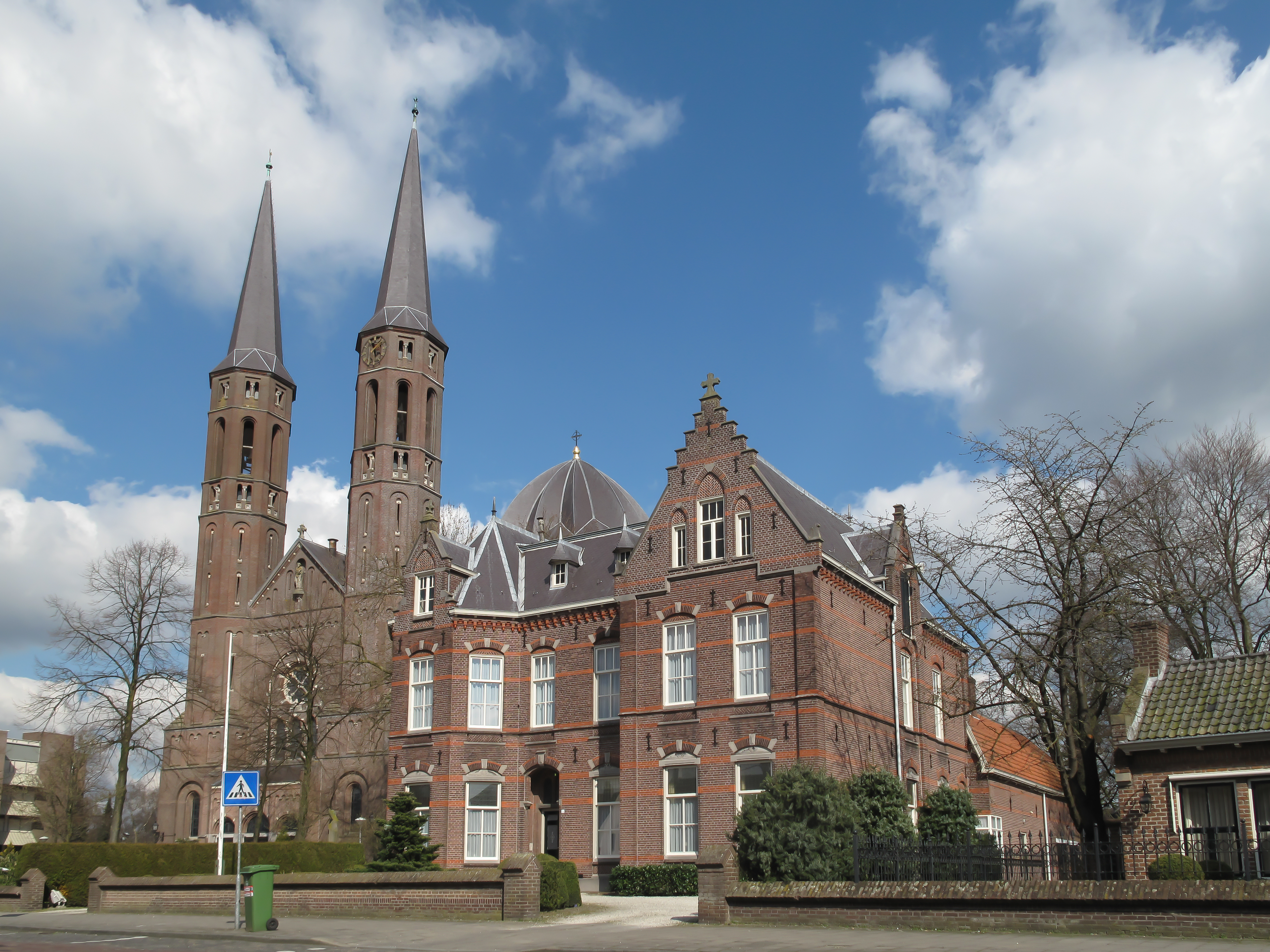
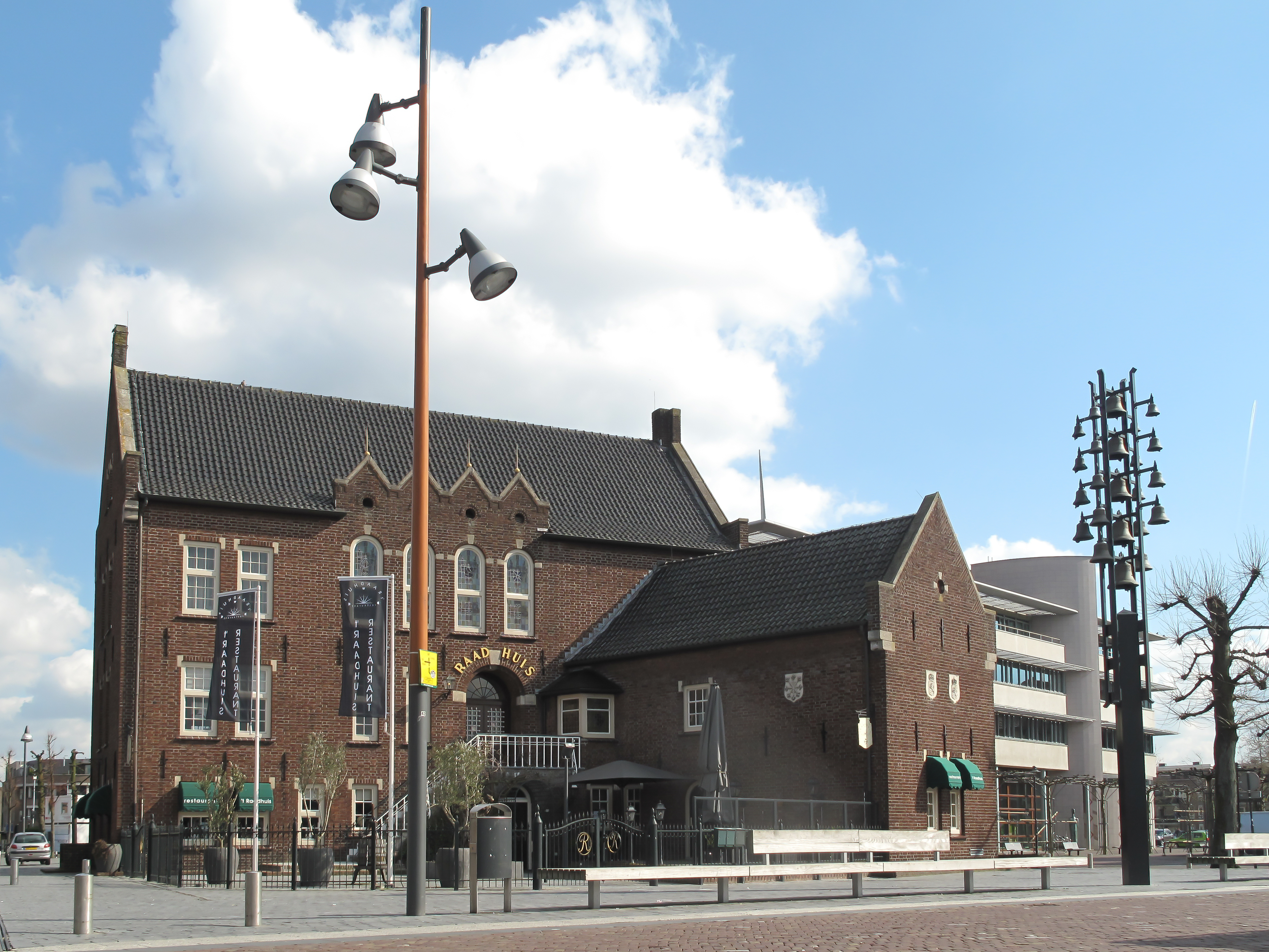
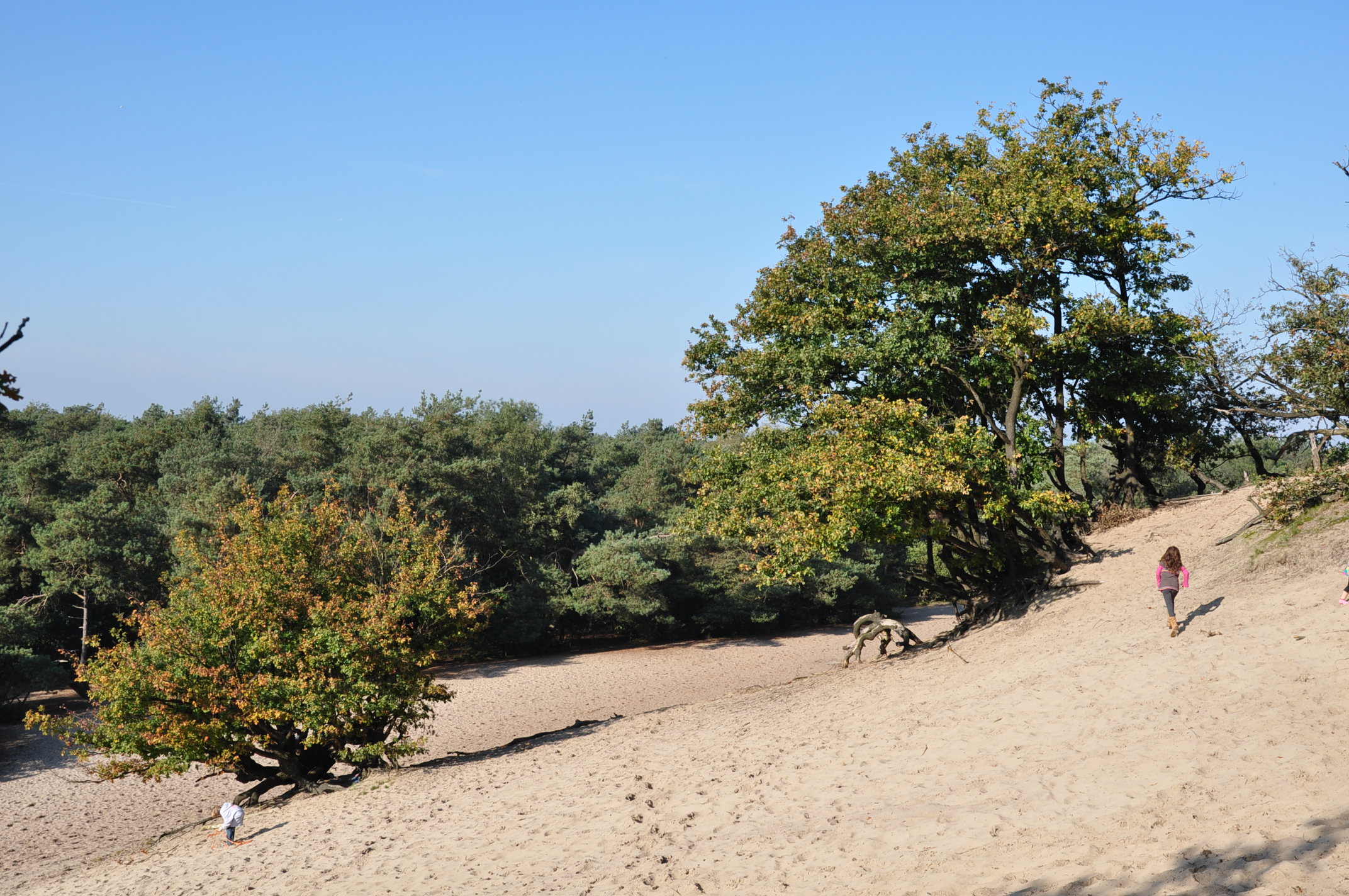
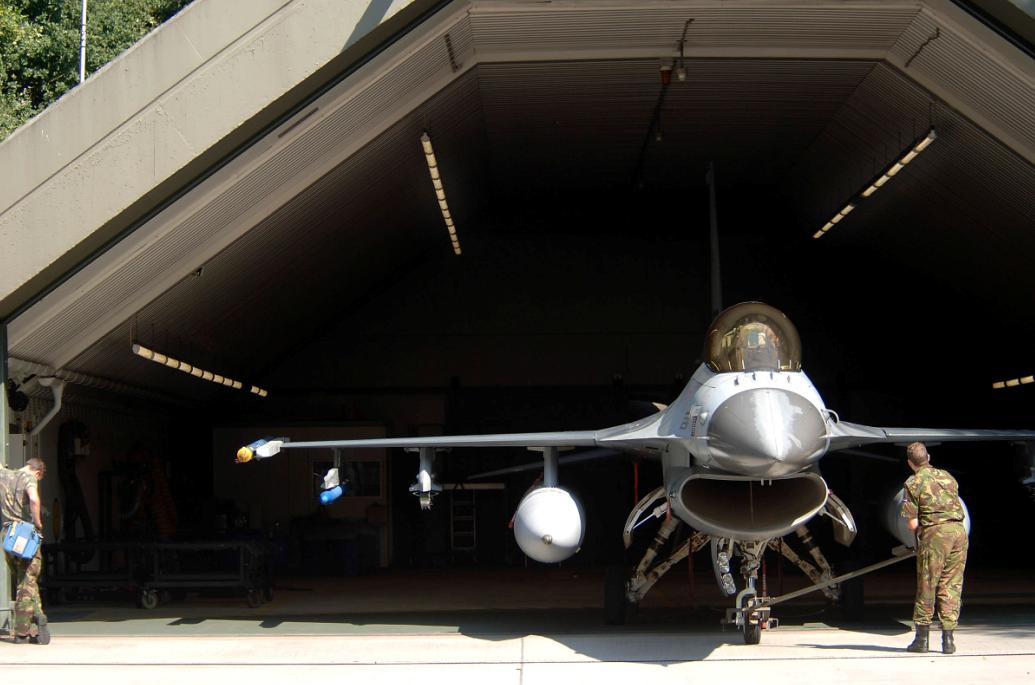
- Top left: Church of St. Peter, top right: Former town hall Bottom left: Bedaf Dunes, bottom right: Volkel Air Base

- Flag Coat of arms

- Location in the province of North Brabant in the Netherlands Uden (Netherlands)
- Coordinates: 51°39′N 5°37′E
- Country: Netherlands
- Province: North Brabant
- Municipality: Maashorst

Area
  - Town: 36.57 km^{2} (14.12 sq mi)
- Elevation: 16 m (52 ft)

Population (2021)
  - Town: 59,700
  - Density: 1,630/km^{2} (4,230/sq mi)
- Time zone: UTC+1 (CET)
  - Summer (DST): UTC+2 (CEST)
- Postcode: 5400–5406
- Area code: 0413
- Website: www.uden.nl

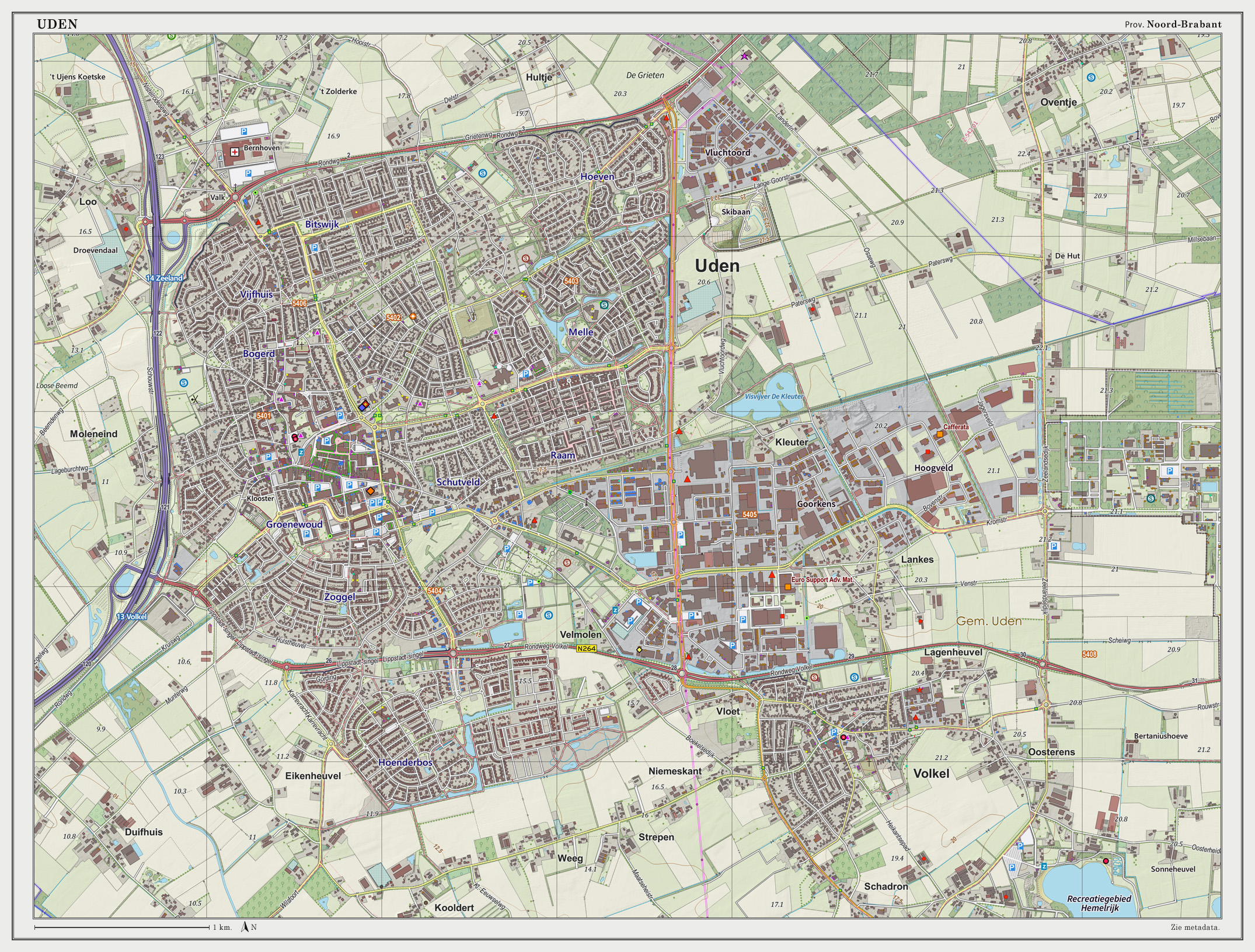
Map of Uden (town), 2014.

Uden (Dutch pronunciation: [ˈydə(n)]) is a town and former municipality in the province of North Brabant, in the Netherlands. Since 2022, it has been part of the new municipality of Maashorst.

== History ==
Uden was first recorded around 1190 as "Uthen". However, earlier settlements have been found in the areas of modern-day Moleneind, Vorstenburg and Bitswijk and evidence of Ice Age settlements has been found near the hamlet of Slabroek. From 1324 Uden was ruled by the Valkenburg house and became a part of the Land van Ravenstein. After 1397 it became a part of the German duchy of Cleves.

Uden was hardly affected by the Eighty Years' War and gained religious freedom in 1631. A result of this was the establishment in the municipality of the Crosiers, who fled from Protestant Dutch oppression in 's-Hertogenbosch in 1638. After the peace of Munster in 1648, Uden remained outside the Dutch republic and was a haven of religious tolerance, and Catholics from the nearby towns of Veghel, Nistelrode and Erp were able to build churches at the municipality's boundaries. The period of 1648–1795 saw an increase in prosperity due to the weekly markets, however, the town was almost destroyed by a fire in 1746. The Dutch folk-hero Kobus van der Schlossen was locally active at this time.

In 1795, Uden was taken by French troops and incorporated into the Dutch republic and has been a part of the Kingdom of the Netherlands since 1810. After that time Uden's wealth diminished, mainly due to competition from the neighbouring Brabant towns, resulting in immigration to the Midwestern United States.

In 1848, The Dominican Catholic missionary Father Theodore J. van den Broek led a group of Dutch Catholics from Uden to Little Chute, Wisconsin, beginning a pattern of immigration to northeast Wisconsin that would last until the early twentieth century. That region of Wisconsin remains largely populated by descendants of Dutch Catholic immigrants from the Uden area. The Midwest was selected for its fairly similar landscape, which allowed the East Dutch immigrants, who were primarily farmers, to continue the same agricultural practices in the United States.

On 12 June 1840, a meteorite weighing approximately 720 grams fell into a field just outside Uden. It narrowly missed a group of laborers digging for peat nearby.

In 1855, the village of Volkel founded its own parish.

Uden began to specialise in the growth of cherries from 1860 onwards. In 1886, the old Petrus-church was demolished by fire and replaced by a new larger one.

During World War I (in which the Netherlands stayed neutral) North Brabant had many Belgian refugees. A refugee camp was erected at Vluchtoord in Uden, which housed several thousand Flemish refugees until 1918.

In the 1920s, people started to cultivate the extensive heathlands in the eastern part of the municipality, called "De Peel". In 1922, a new village was built, called Terraveen and later renamed Odiliapeel.

After Uden was struck by a devastating cyclone in 1925, it was visited by Wilhelmina, queen of the Netherlands.

Since the 1950s, Uden has become a regional centre of development, providing much needed economic growth. Due to its growth, very little is left of the old town's character.

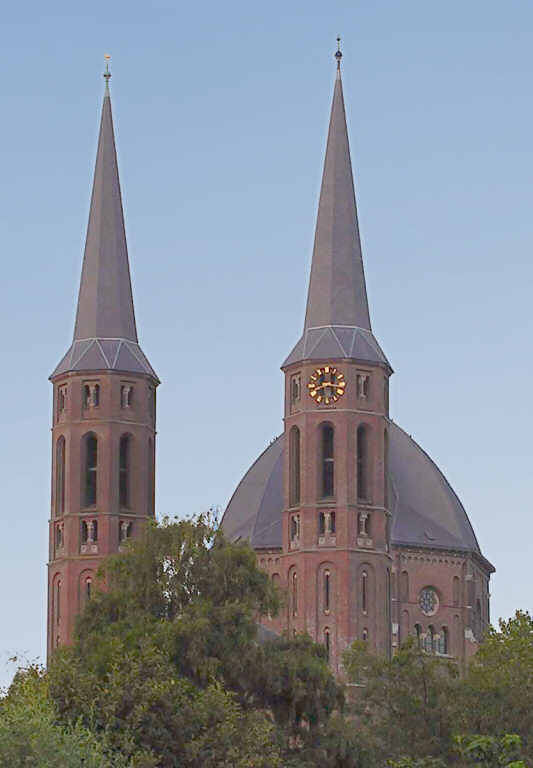
Church of Sint-Petrus

== Population centres ==
- Odiliapeel
- Uden
- Volkel

== Places of interest ==
- Brigitinesse abbey of Mary's Refuge
- Church of Saint Peter's Chair
- Chapel of the Crosiers
- Mill of Jettens
- Monastery of the Crosiers
- Monastery of the Ursulines
- Volkel Air Base
- World War II cemetery

== Notable people ==
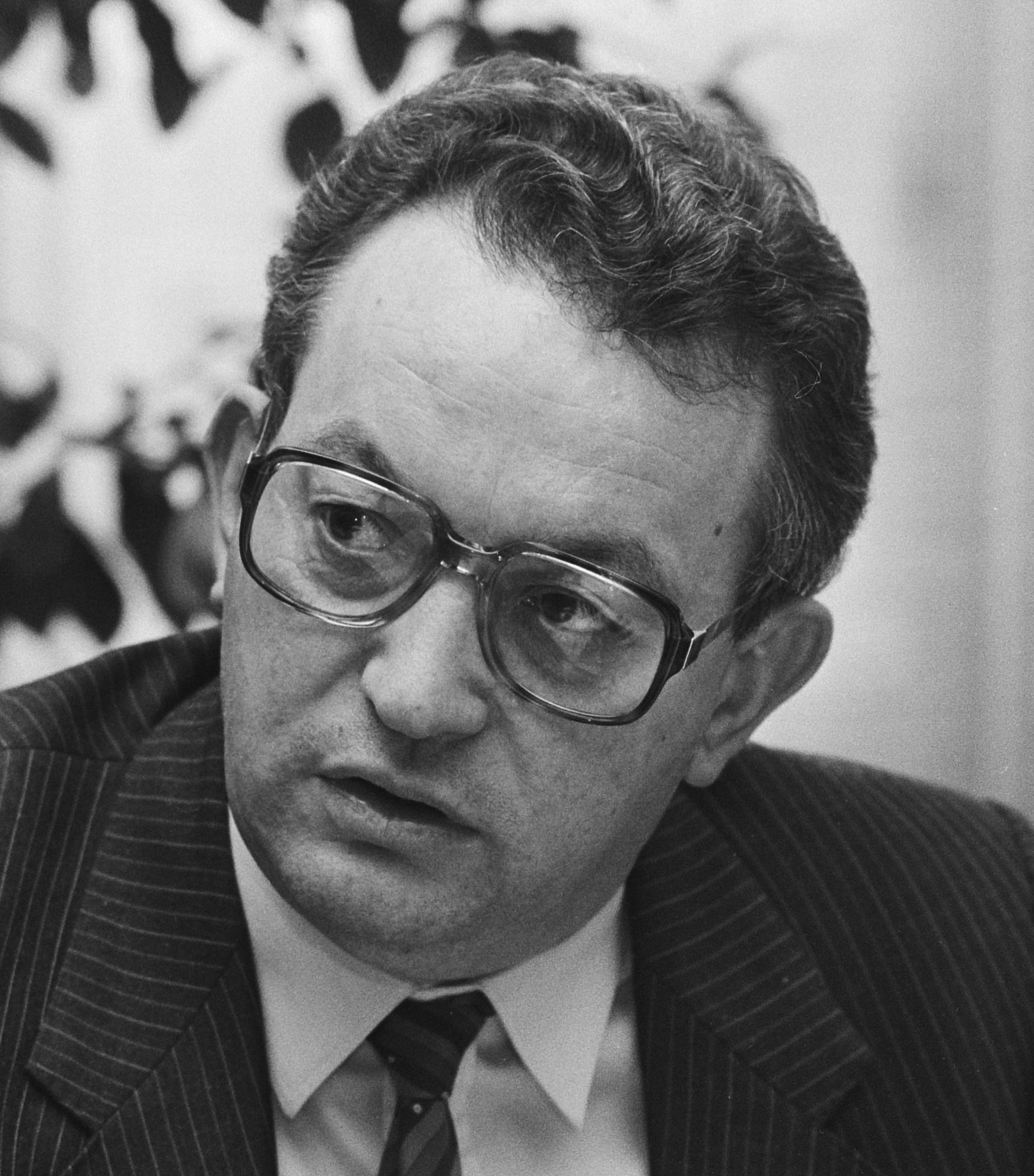
Gerrit Braks, 1984

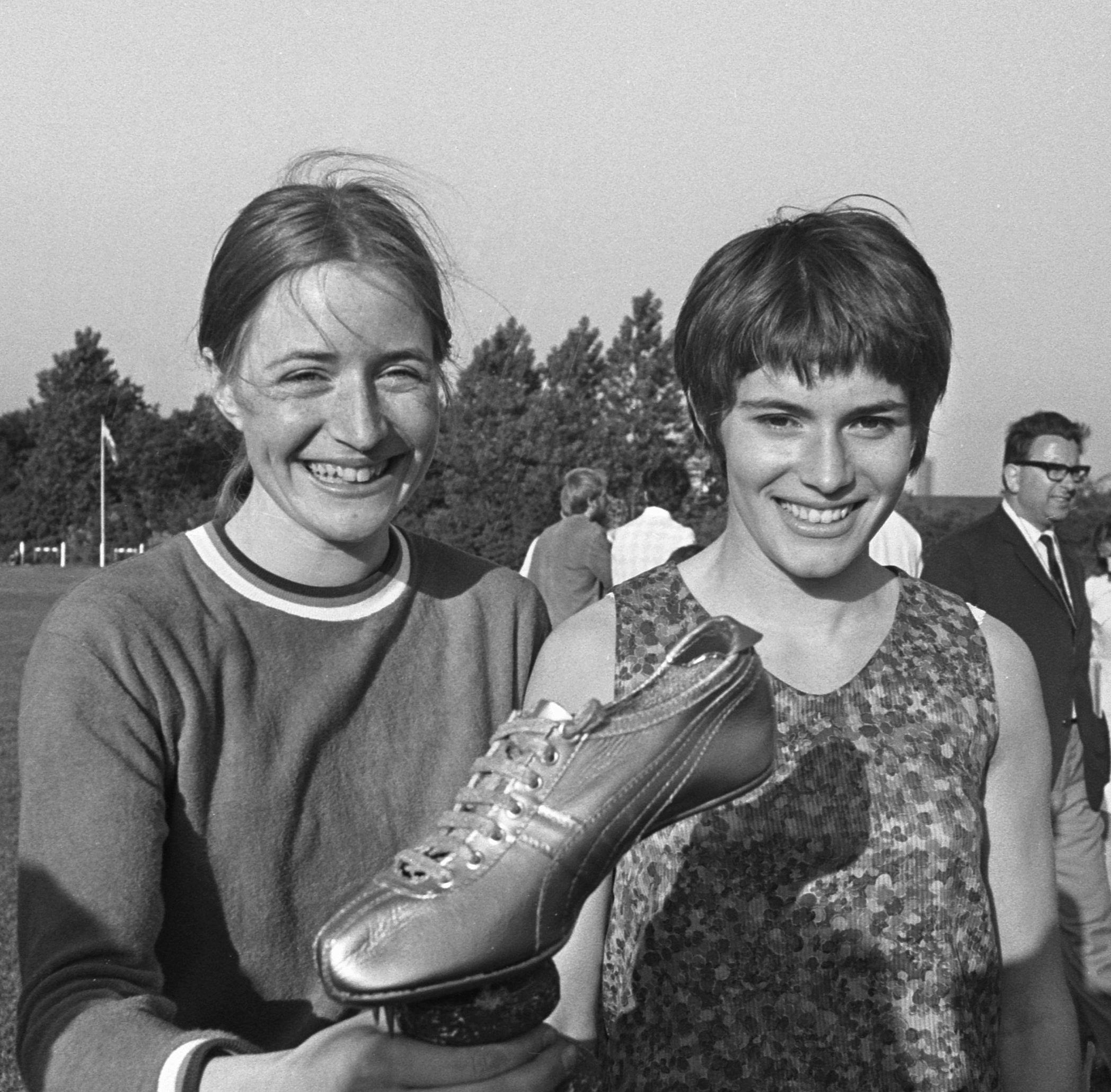
Wilma and Riet van den Berg, 1970

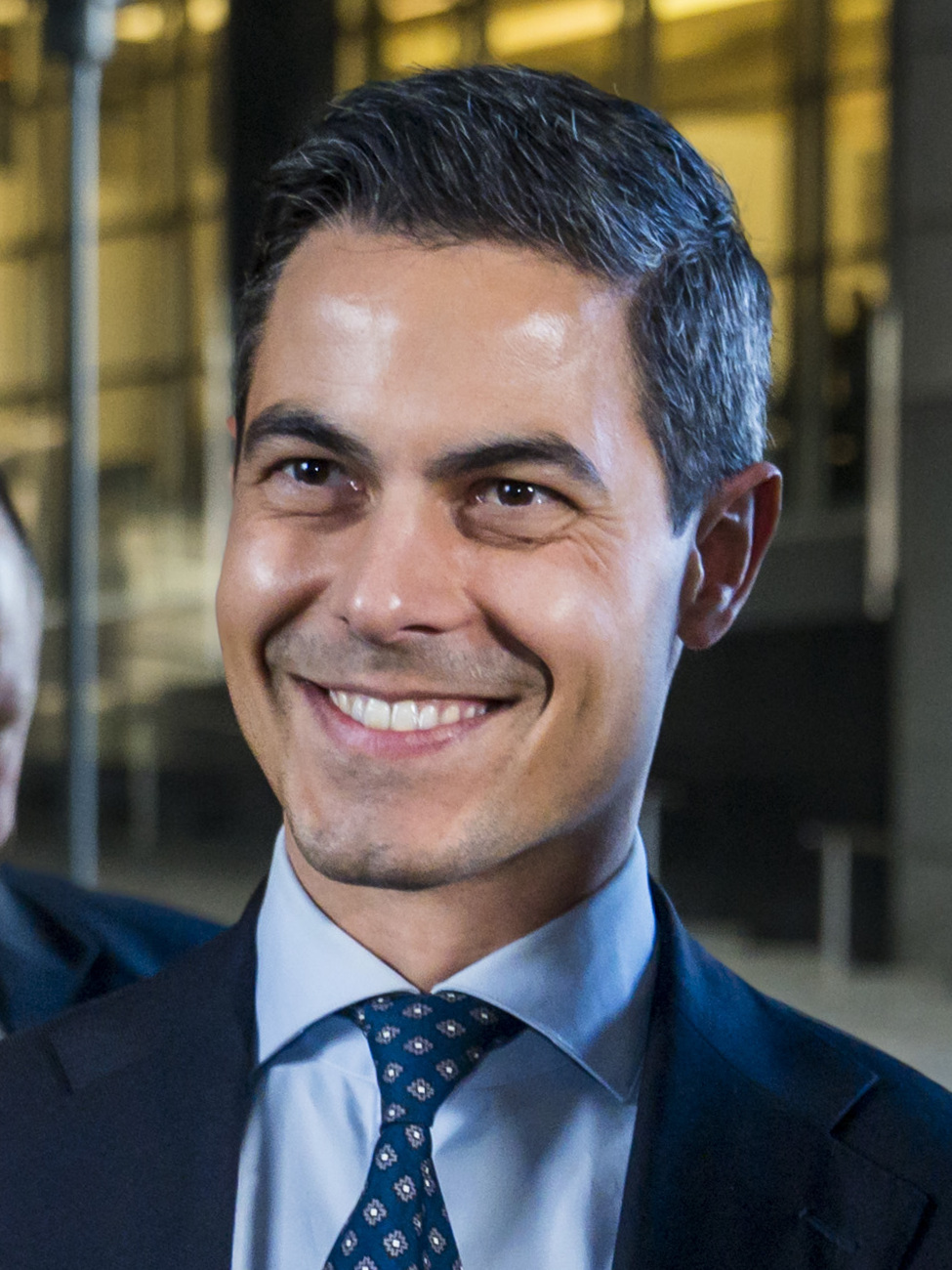
Rob Jetten, 2026

- Theodorus Verhoeven (1907–1990), missionary and archaeologist
- Gerrit Braks (1933–2017), politician and agronomist
- Theodore J. van den Broek, Dominican Catholic Missionary who led a wave of Dutch emigration to the American Midwest, primarily Wisconsin.
- Gerrit van Dijk (1938–2012), animator, filmmaker, actor, and painter
- Cilia van Dijk (1941–2023)), film producer
- Addy van den Krommenacker (born 1950), fashion designer
- Sultan Günal-Gezer (born 1961), politician, municipal councillor and alderman of Uden
- Martin van Drunen (born 1966), death metal vocalist
- Nikkie de Jager (born 1994), makeup artist and beauty vlogger
- Rob Jetten (born 1987), politician, prime minister of the Netherlands since 2026

=== Sport ===
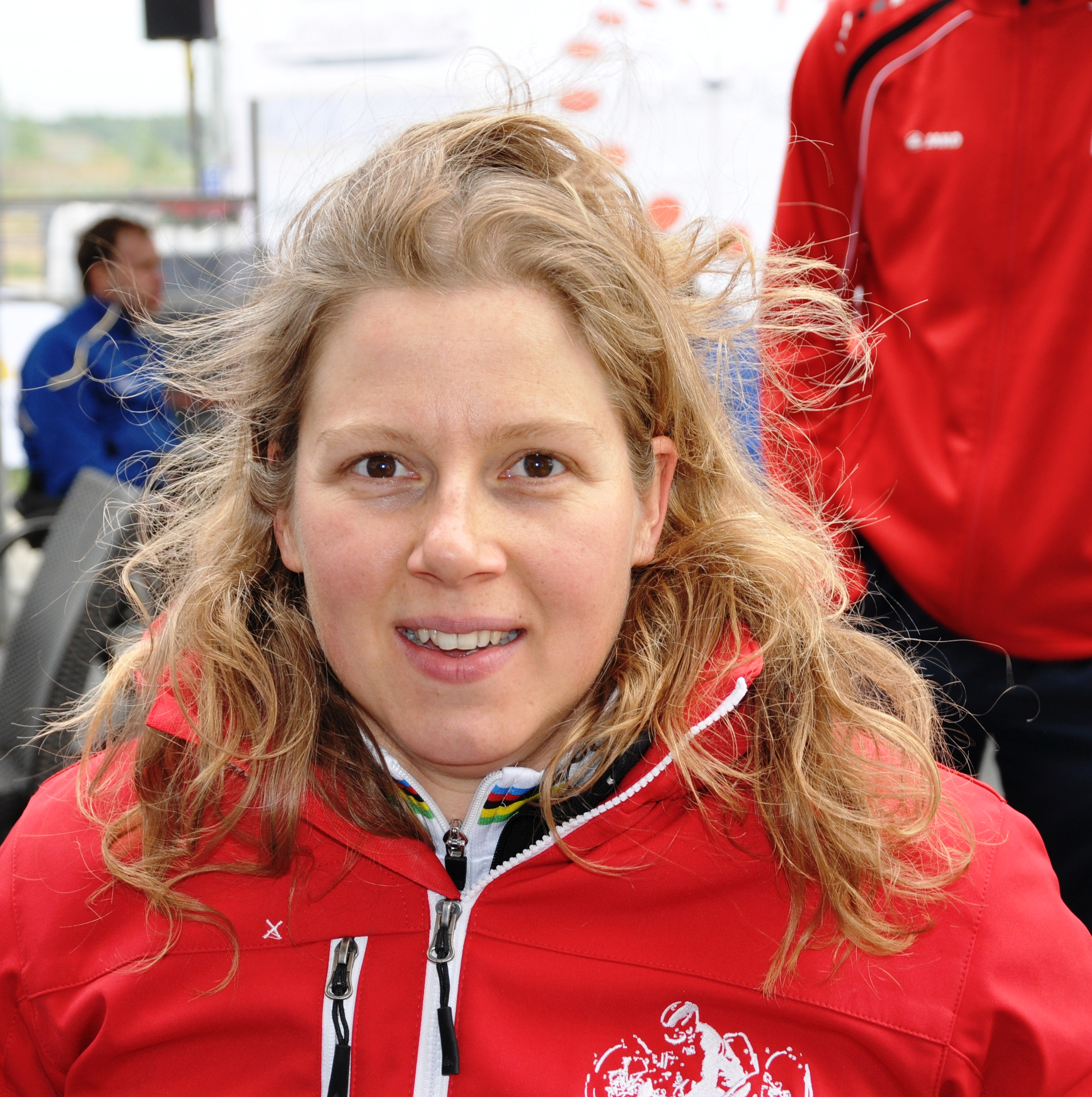
Laura de Vaan, 2016

- Theo Willems (1891–1960), archer, team gold medallist at the 1920 Summer Olympics
- Wilma van den Berg (born 1947), sprinter, competed at the 1968 and 1972 Summer Olympics (which she left in the middle, in sympathy with the Israelis after the Munich Massacre)
- Earnie Stewart (born 1969), American retired soccer player
- Laura de Vaan (born 1980), Paralympian who competes in handcycle events
- Cheryl Maas (born 1984), snowboarder, competed at three Winter Olympics
- Maud van der Meer (born 1992), swimmer, competed at the 2016 Summer Olympics

== International relations ==
Uden is twinned with

- Lippstadt, Germany

== See also ==
- Volkel Air Base

== Gallery ==
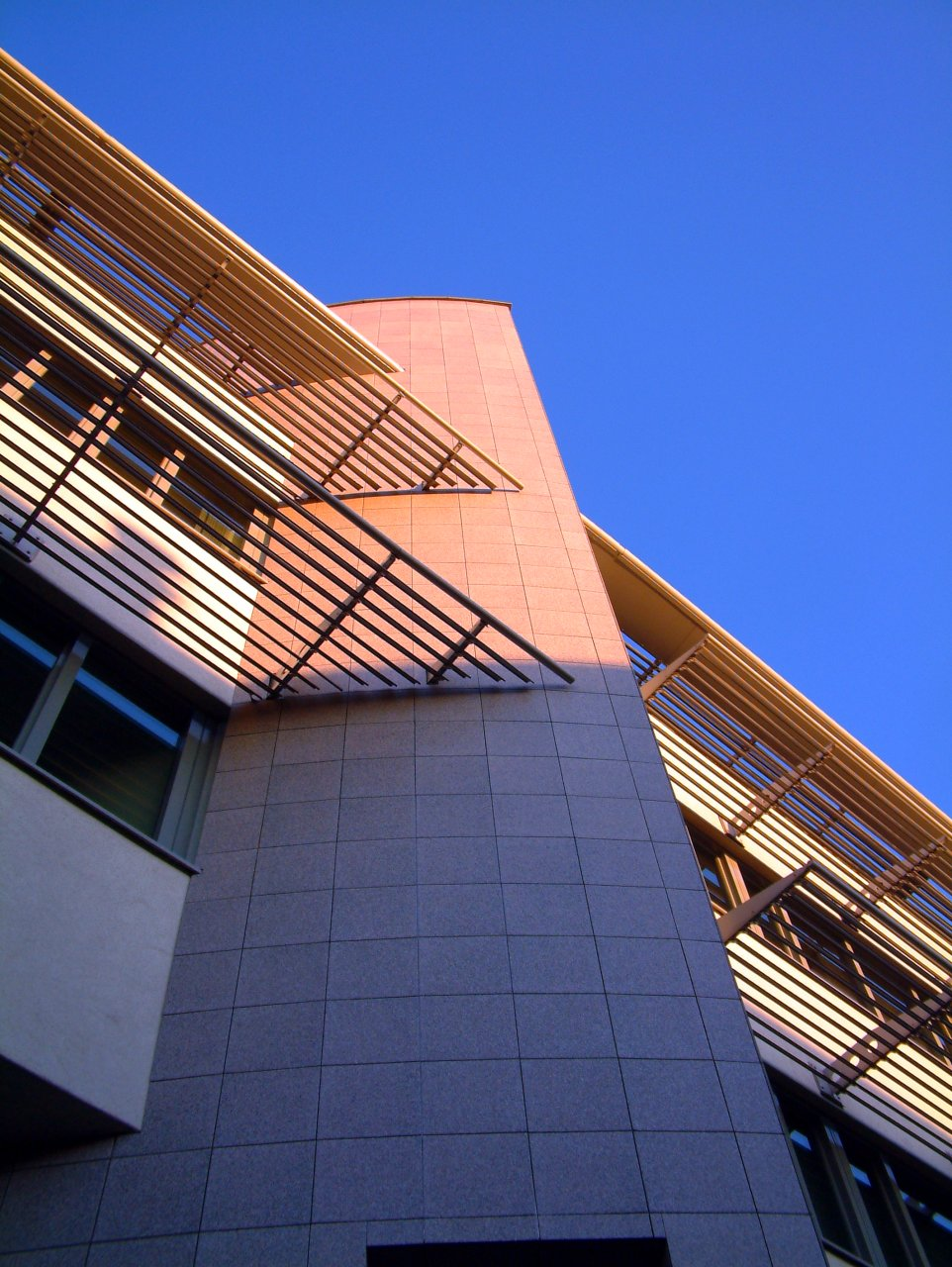
Uden-City Hall

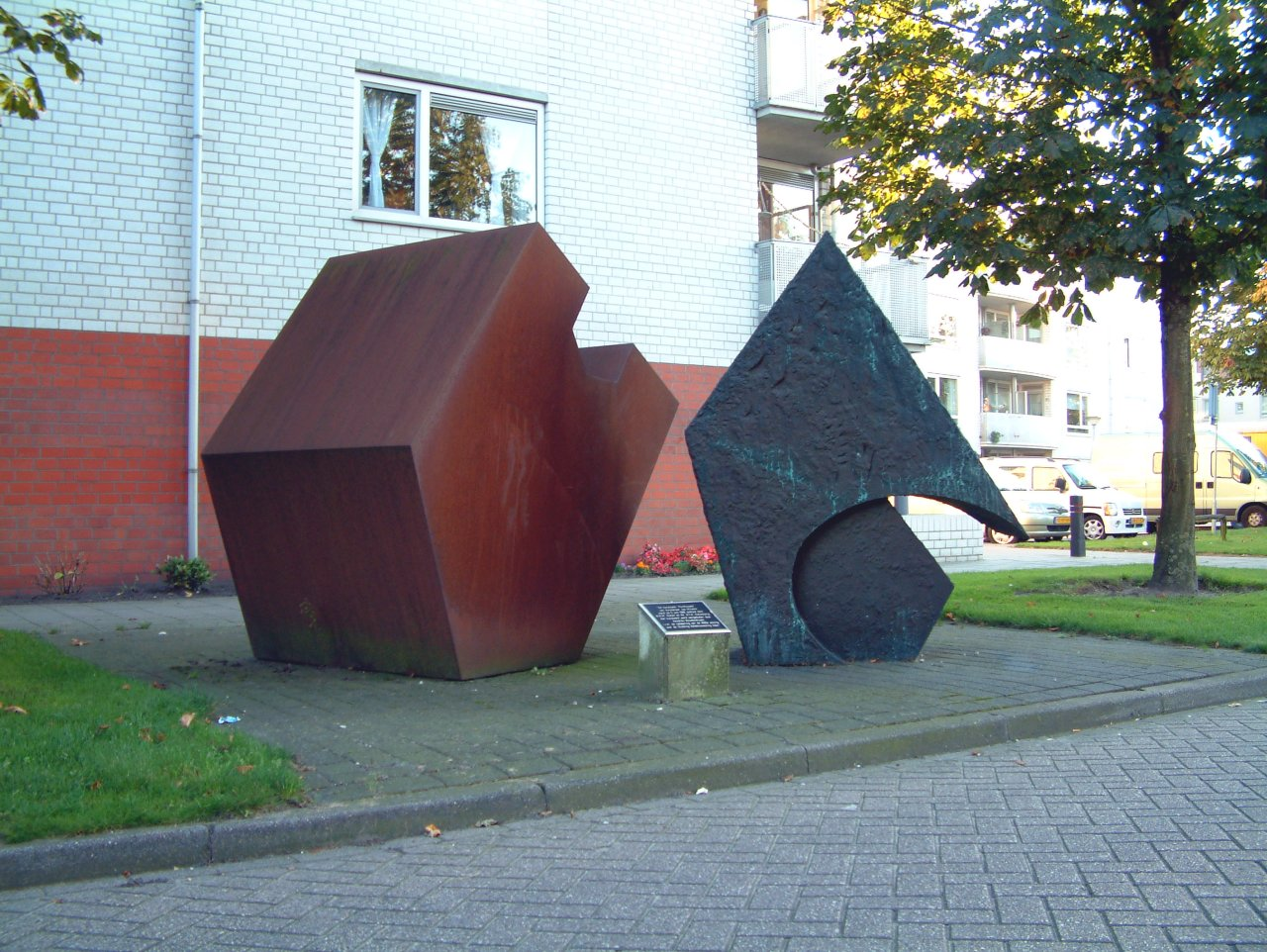
Uden-Urban Art-Penthouses

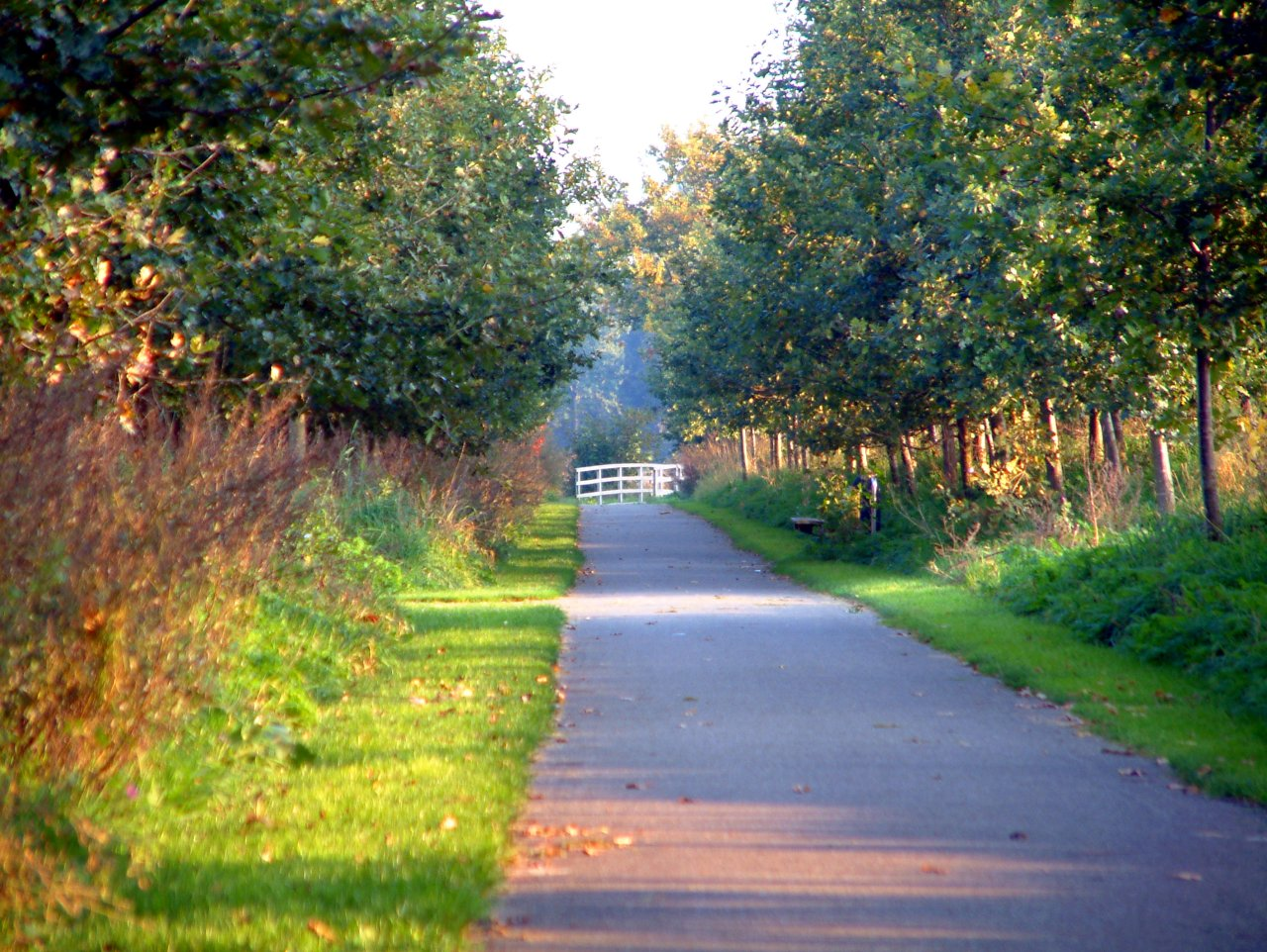
Uden-Zuid-Groen op zuid-cycle path

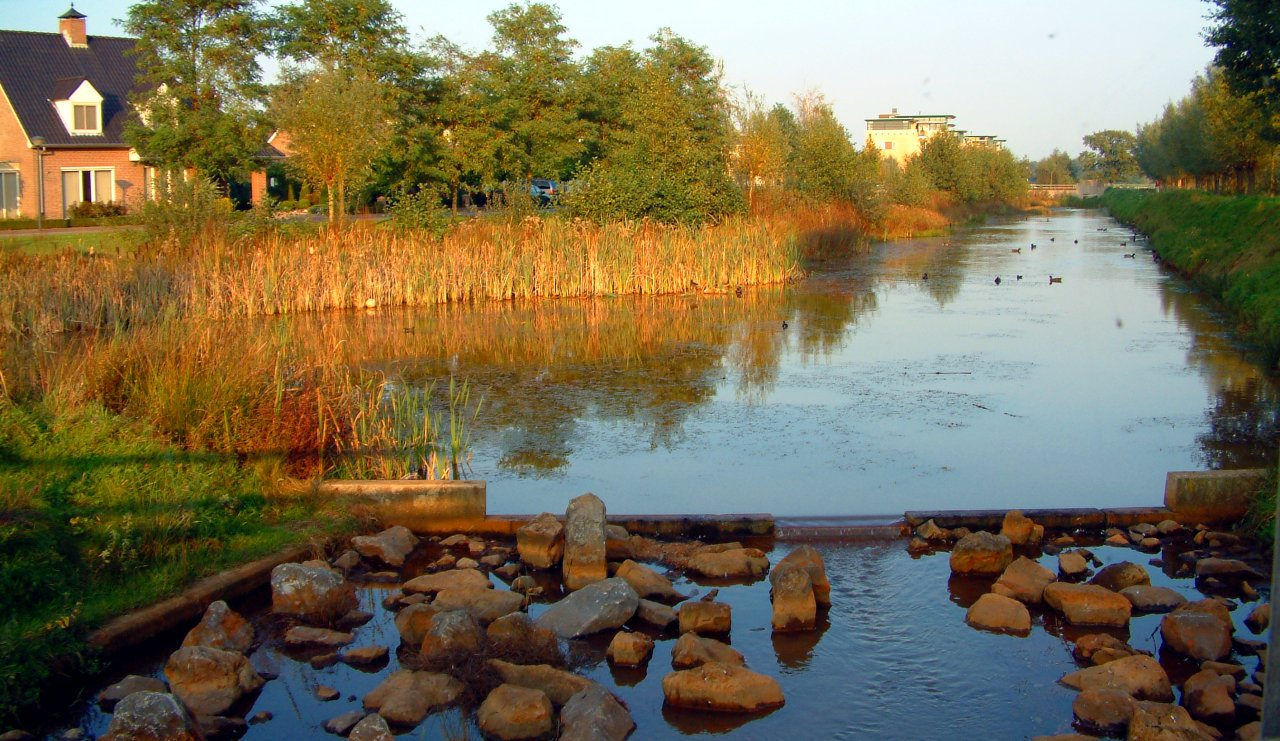
Uden-Zuid-Riviertje
