= Appleton High School =

Appleton High School is the name of several high schools in Appleton, Wisconsin:

- Appleton East High School (est. 1967)
- Appleton North High School (est. 1995)
- Appleton West High School (est. 1915)
