= ANHS =

ANHS may refer to:

- Aliso Niguel High School, Aliso Viejo, California
- Antelope High School, Antelope, California
- Appleton North High School, Appleton, Wisconsin
