= Valley Transit (Wisconsin) =

Bus service serving Appleton, Wisconsin/Fox Cities

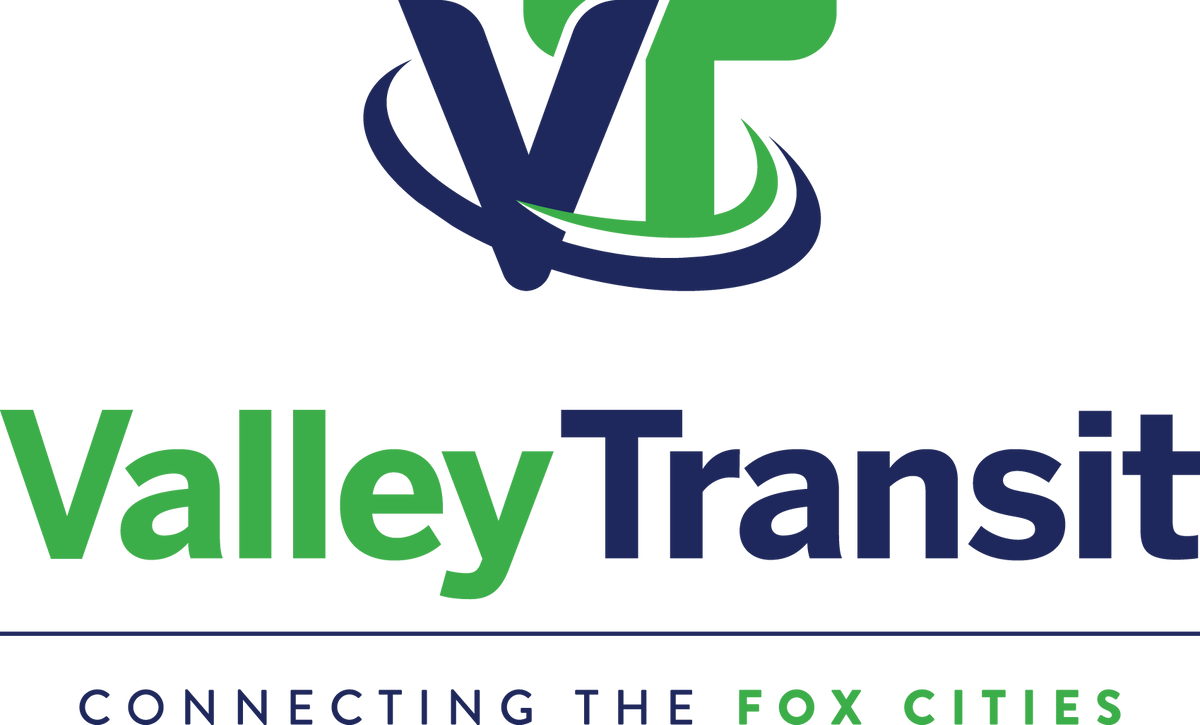

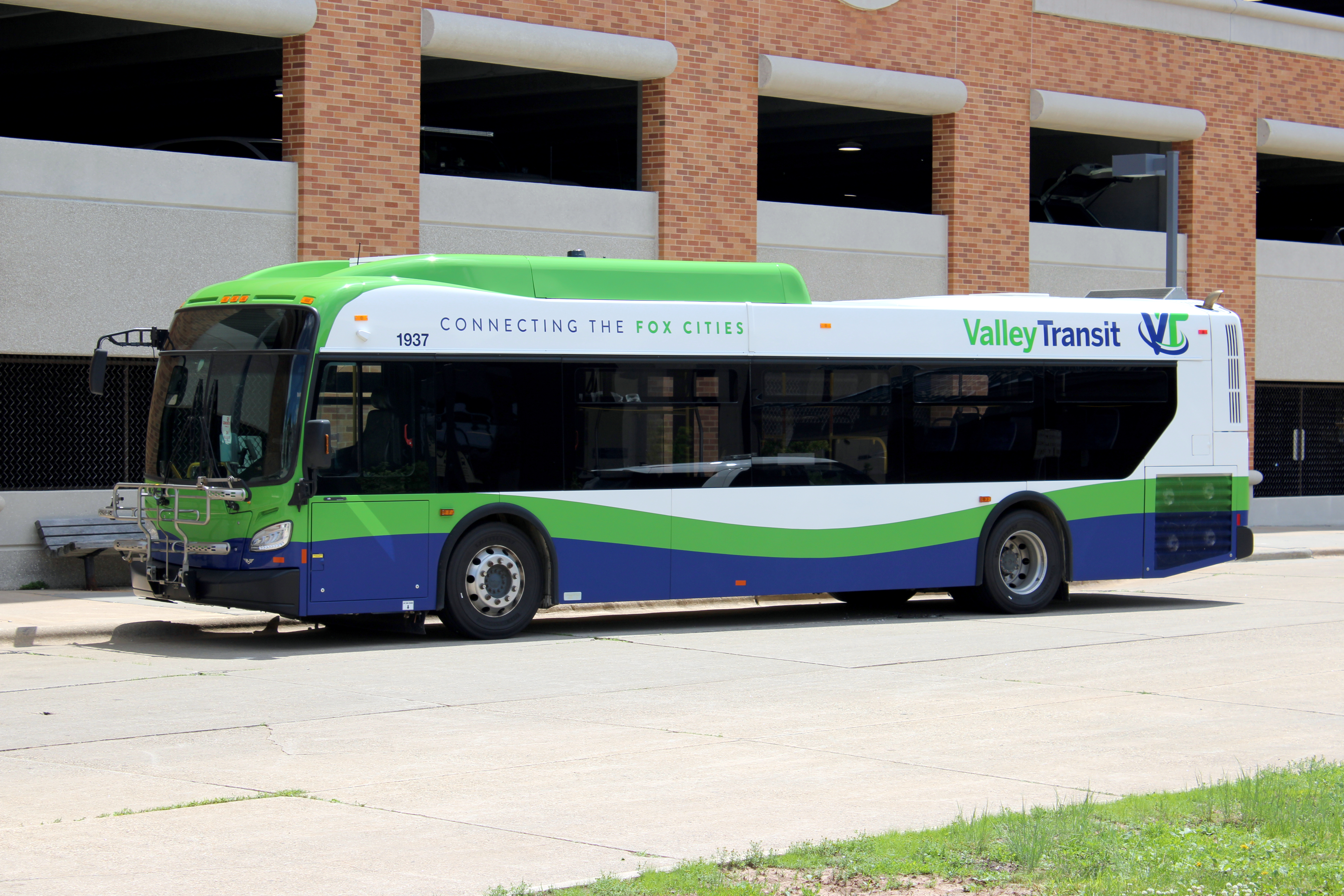
- A Valley Transit bus
- Parent: City of Appleton
- Commenced operation: 1930; 96 years ago
- Headquarters: 801 S. Whitman Ave, Appleton, Wisconsin
- Locale: Appleton/Fox Cities
- Service type: Bus & paratransit
- Routes: 20
- Stations: 3: Appleton Transit Center; Neenah Transit Center; North Transfer Point
- Depots: 1
- Fleet: 33
- Daily ridership: 3,326 (2020)
- Annual ridership: 737,910 (2022)
- Website: myvalleytransit.com

Valley Transit is a city bus and paratransit commission operated by the city government of Appleton, Wisconsin. It has operated as a bus system since 1930, and has been fully operated by the city since 1978.

The system operates across the Fox Cities and serves the cities of Appleton, Kaukauna, Menasha, and Neenah, as well as the towns of Buchanan and Grand Chute; and the villages of Fox Crossing, Darboy, Kimberly, and Little Chute. Through an agreement with the Appleton Area School District, Valley Transit allows all students enrolled in an AASD middle/high school to ride the bus for free during the school year.

== History ==
Public transportation in the area originated with streetcar systems, which operated from 1886 to 1930 when they were completely replaced by buses operated by a company called Fox River Bus Lines. Toward the end of the 1960s, the city began to subsidize the company, until it bought and took over operations on New Year's Day 1978.

== Routes ==
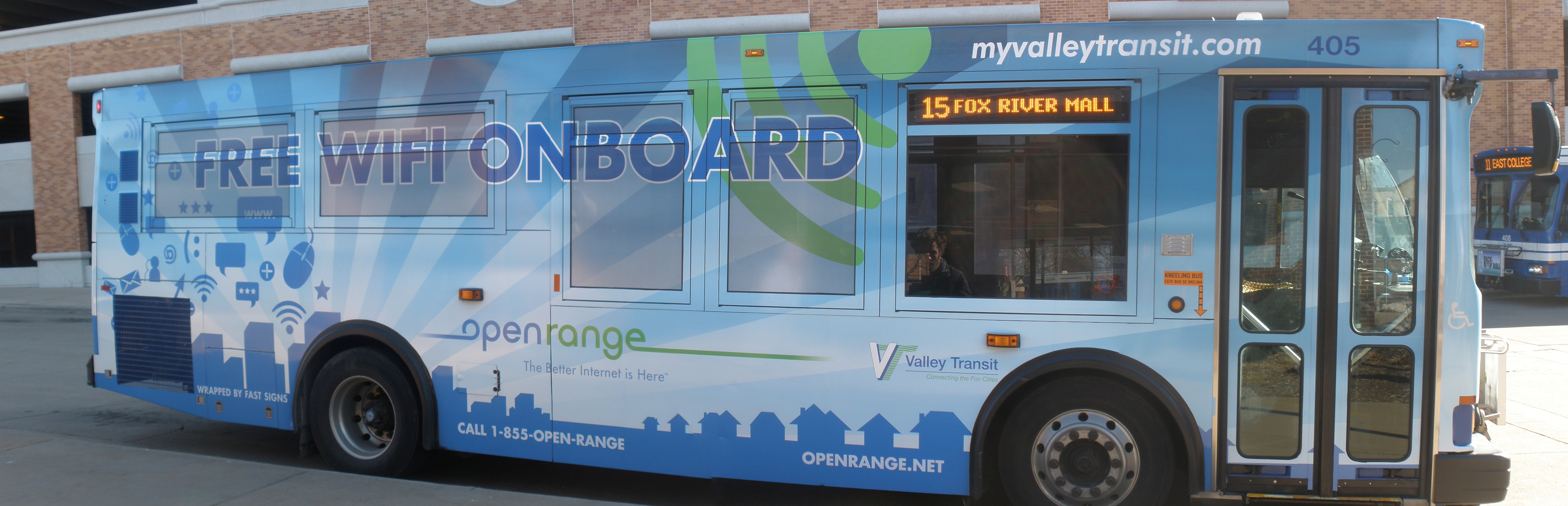
Route 15 bus wrapped in an advertisement in 2011.

Valley Transit's operations consist of 18 fixed bus routes, meaning they begin and end at the same place. In addition, they operate multiple seasonal (Tripper) routes which typically only run a limited number of times daily to connect most of the AASD middle/high schools to the Appleton Transit Center. Valley Transit also operates a paratransit service (contracted out to a local bus company), which shuttles elderly passengers from their homes to regular-route bus stops and functions much as a taxi service for disabled passengers. The company provides service on Weekdays and Saturdays, with no service on Sundays.

Number	Name	Notes	Map
1	Midway	—	Map
2	Prospect	—	Map
3	Mason	—	Map
4	Richmond	—	Map
5	North Oneida	—	Map
6	Meade	Saturdays	Map
8	Telulah	No Saturday Service	Map
9	The Link		Map
11	East College/Buchanan	No Saturday Service	Map
12	Fox Valley Tech	—	Map
15	West College	—	Map
16	Northeast	No Saturday Service	Map
19	Southeast	Saturdays	Map
20	Heart of the Valley	—	Map
30	Neenah/Menasha	—	Map
31	East Neenah	—	Map
32	West Neenah	—	Map
41	West Fox Valley	—	Map

== Facilities ==
=== Terminals ===
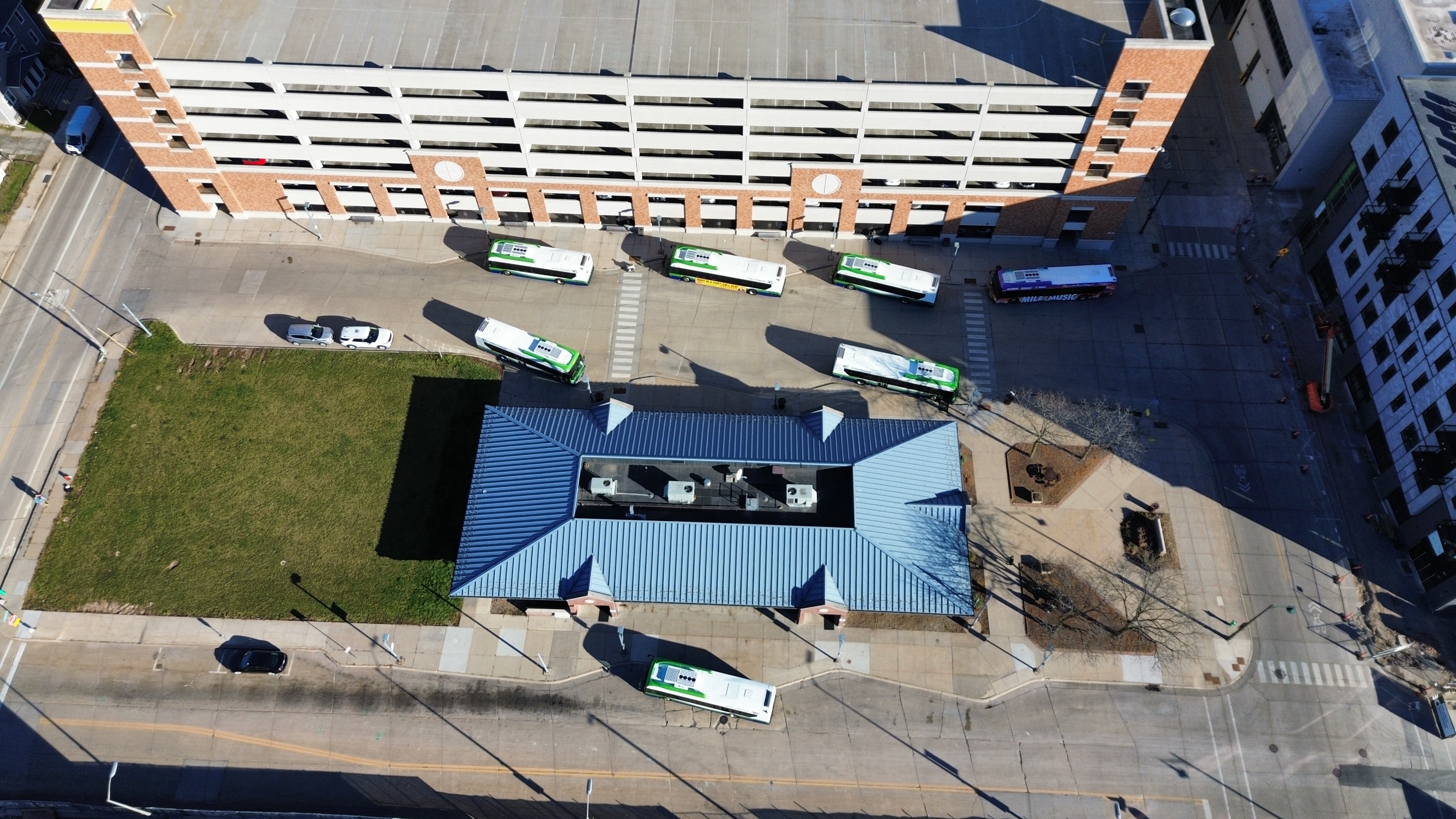
Appleton Transit Center from above looking east

- Appleton Transit Center - 100 E Washington St, Appleton, WI 54911 (Contains an indoor climate controlled waiting area with public washrooms. All routes except 10, 31, and 32 start/end here)
- North Transfer Point - Located behind the Northland Ave. Piggly Wiggly (Routes 5, 6, and 16 offer service)
- Neenah Transit Center - Doty Avenue in front of Neenah City Hall. Routes 31, 32 start and end here, with connections to routes 30 and 41.

=== Storage ===
- Valley Transit Operations Facility - 801 S Whitman Ave, Appleton, WI 54914 is a bus garage and maintenance facility. Valley Transit holds their offices/operations center here.

== Fleet ==
Announced in 2018, the older buses were planned to be phased out as new buses are purchased, and as of late 2023, the Valley Transit fleet included at least one New Flyer Xcelsior Clean Diesel bus for each route. As of the last transport development plan released in 2020, Valley Transit operated a total fleet of 33 buses:

Year	Bus type	Fleet
1994	Orion V	2
2003	Orion VII	5
2004	Orion VII	15
2005	Orion VII	4
2017	New Flyer Xcelsior	3
2018	New Flyer Xcelsior	1

== The Connector ==
A shared-ride taxi service operates Monday through Saturday that connects public transit users with their destinations. This service requires advance reservations but allows users in remote or newly developed areas of the Fox Cities transit access.

== Ridership ==
	Ridership	Change over previous year
2013	1,274,139	n/a
2014	1,271,282	▼0.22%
2015	1,249,880	▼1.68%
2016	1,191,766	▼4.65%
2017	1,146,834	▼3.77%
2018	1,159,526	▲1.11%
2019	1,112,264	▼4.08%
2020	640,194	▼42.44%
2021	658,366	▲2.84%
2022	737,910	▲12.08%
2023	777,302	▲5.34%

== See also ==
- GO Transit (Wisconsin) Bus service serving Oshkosh, Wisconsin
- Green Bay Metro Bus service serving the Green Bay, Wisconsin Area
- Appleton Transit Center
- List of bus transit systems in the United States
