= Valley New School =

Coordinates: 44°15′44.2″N 88°24′21.4″W

- Appleton, Wisconsin; United States

Information
- Type: Public secondary
- Established: 2003
- Oversight: Appleton Area School District
- Grades: 7–12
- Enrollment: 66 (2023–2024)
- Colors: Blue and White
- Mascot: Flytrap
- Newspaper: Valley New School Times
- Website: vns.aasd.k12.wi.us

Valley New School (VNS) is a charter school in Appleton, Wisconsin operated by the Appleton Area School District. It has a capacity of 68 students in grades 7 through 12. The school operates through a project-based learning model, with the philosophy that 21st century skills and the process of learning is more important than learning a standard curriculum.

== History ==
Valley New School opened in fall 2003 after several years of development. In its first year the school served students in seventh through tenth grade, but in the next two years it expanded one grade each year to serve students in seventh through twelfth grade. The original intention of the school was to expand each year to eventually serve upwards of two hundred students. However, it has remained small in keeping with its mission of creating a community.

== Facility ==
Valley New School is located in downtown, Appleton, Wisconsin, on the second floor of the City Center. When the site of Valley New School was selected, it was decided that a location surrounded by the businesses, organizations and opportunities of downtown would be optimal. The City Center is near the bus station, which creates access to transportation in the Fox Valley. It is also situated near the Appleton Public Library. Pairs of students share computers located at their workstations. The school also has a music room, study room, woodshop, kitchen, library, science lab, an area dedicated to creating art and pottery.

== Advisors ==
The teachers of Valley New School are referred to as advisors because they serve as coaches and mentors for the students. Advisors coach students in academics, projects and personal issues. The student advisor ratio is limited to 17:1. Each student receives individual time with his or her advisor weekly, along with daily interactions. Advisors also make up the Site Management Committee, which governs the daily operation of Valley New School.

== Project process ==
Valley New School students use research projects aligning with their interests to gain school credit and cover state-issued learning standards. Although projects range across a wide variety of topics, each follows the same basic process. The process has five phases: proposal, research, planning, production and evaluation. In the proposal phase, students choose a topic and perform preliminary research to further understand what the topic is about. After that, they create a rationale detailing their interests in the project topic and a list of questions they plan to answer in the course of the project. The proposal phase ends when students meet with two advisors in a proposal meeting and discuss the plan for the project. Then students begin the research phase, during which they takes notes from a variety of sources. After students answers the questions they set out to resolve, they start the planning phase. In this phase, students meet with their advisors and decide how to represent their research in a product. Students then creates their products and written products in the production phase. In the evaluation phase, student write an analysis evaluating their progress over the course of the project as well as their learning and level of thinking. Finally, students meet with their advisors and discuss their performance and what they learned. Students earn school credit based on the time spent (typically 1 credit per 100 hours) and the quality of the project.

=== Math and reading ===
Because of Valley New School's lack of a formal class structure, math and reading are studied at an individual pace. Students learn math with an online program called ALEKS math and each student is required to spend an allotted half-hour each morning using the program. Reading is completed using a modified project process. Students create plans for a reading study, proposing their projects with their advisors. At the end of the year, students create a product that reflects what they read for the year.

=== Service learning ===
Valley New School requires each student to have a yearly service learning project, which use a modified project process. Student chooses a social issue within the community that interests them, find an organization in the area that addresses those issues, and perform service for them in effort to help solve the problem. Throughout the project, students document their experiences in time logs and produce an analysis document at the end of the project.

== Awards and recognition ==
Valley New School is recognized as a lab school for the EdVisions organization, a national project-based schools cooperative. It received its first dissemination grant in 2008 and used the money to hire an alumnus for the development of a website and videos describing the school's structure and philosophy. It also used the grant money to develop promotional brochures and DVDs and to fund workshops to help teachers, administrators and board members in the creation of charter schools in other areas. Valley New School received a distinguished merit for Charter School Innovator of the Year in 2009 and a Silver Charter School of the Year in 2008, both by the Wisconsin Charter School Association (WCSA). The school was nominated for School of the Year for the WCSA Annual Awards Gala in 2010. For achievements in service learning, Valley New School received the Youth Alliance 2010 group award from the Volunteer Center of East Central Wisconsin.
