= Appleton Transit Center =

Bus station in Appleton, Wisconsin

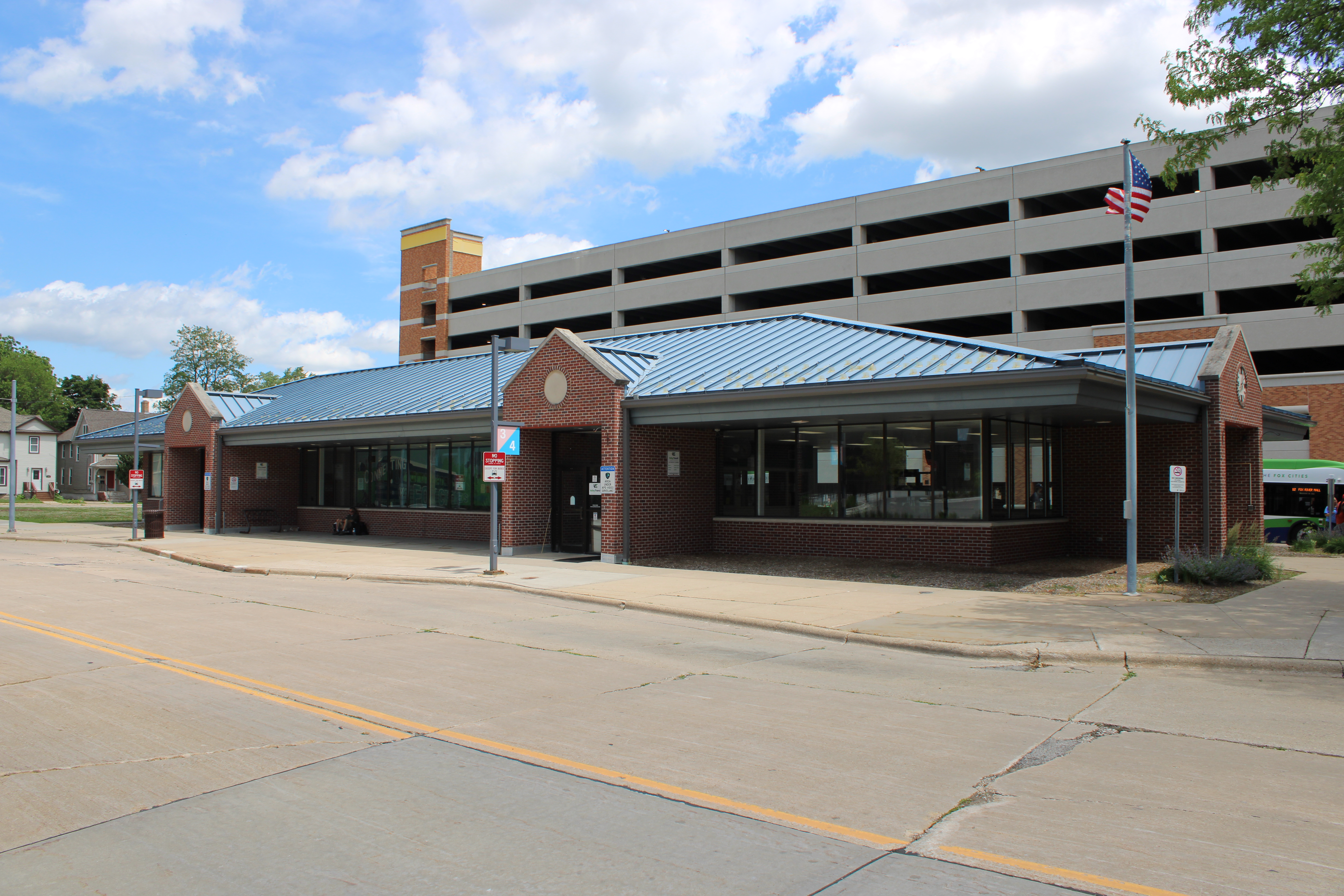
- The Appleton Transit Center in Appleton, WI (2026)

General information
- Location: United States of America
- Coordinates: 44.2634°N 88.40571°W
- Owner: City of Appleton
- Bus routes: 15
- Bus operators: Valley Transit; Greyhound Lines; Amtrak Thruway; Lamers Bus Lines

Construction
- Structure type: At-grade
- Parking: 1 Adjacent parking ramp; 1 Adjacent parking lot
- Cycle facilities: Bike racks around station

Other information
- Station code: APP

History
- Opened: March 1, 1990
Location

The Appleton Transit Center is a bus terminus in downtown Appleton, Wisconsin, located at 100 East Washington Street (on the corner of Washington Street and Oneida Street).

== History ==
The transit center had been hoped to have been completed by fall 1986. On August 1, 1986 the Appleton mayor proposed a design with a rooftop parking lot. The current standalone building was first proposed in April 1989 as a cheaper alternative to plans to renovate and use an existing building. The design included a convenience store, the attendant from which would be responsible for securing the building. This would reduce staffing costs for Valley Transit.

Construction on the center by Valley Transit began on September 12, 1989, and service began on March 1, 1990. 80% of the construction cost was funded by the Urban Mass Transportation Administration. It was the first transit center built in Appleton.

The transit center is planned to be replaced in the mid-2020s with a new facility, which would also contain a mixed-use development, similar to Grand River Station in La Crosse.

== Facilities ==
It has climate-controlled waiting rooms, public washrooms, a payphone with free direct line telephones to Valley Transit, and vending machines. The north side of the building is the location of the Greyhound Lines office. Additional benches are outside, where there are designated bus boarding bays in a traffic-free transfer area. The entire grounds are non-smoking.

== Service ==
The Appleton Transit Center is the center of the Valley Transit system, as most bus routes terminate there. The northwest corner of the property was formerly the boarding place for Greyhound buses, travelling between Green Bay, Wisconsin, and Milwaukee, Wisconsin. This service was withdrawn in 2018. The center also sees service from Lamers Bus Lines. Through ticketing is available from Amtrak; the Amtrak station code for the center is APP.

== Gallery ==
Appleton Transit Station gallery photos
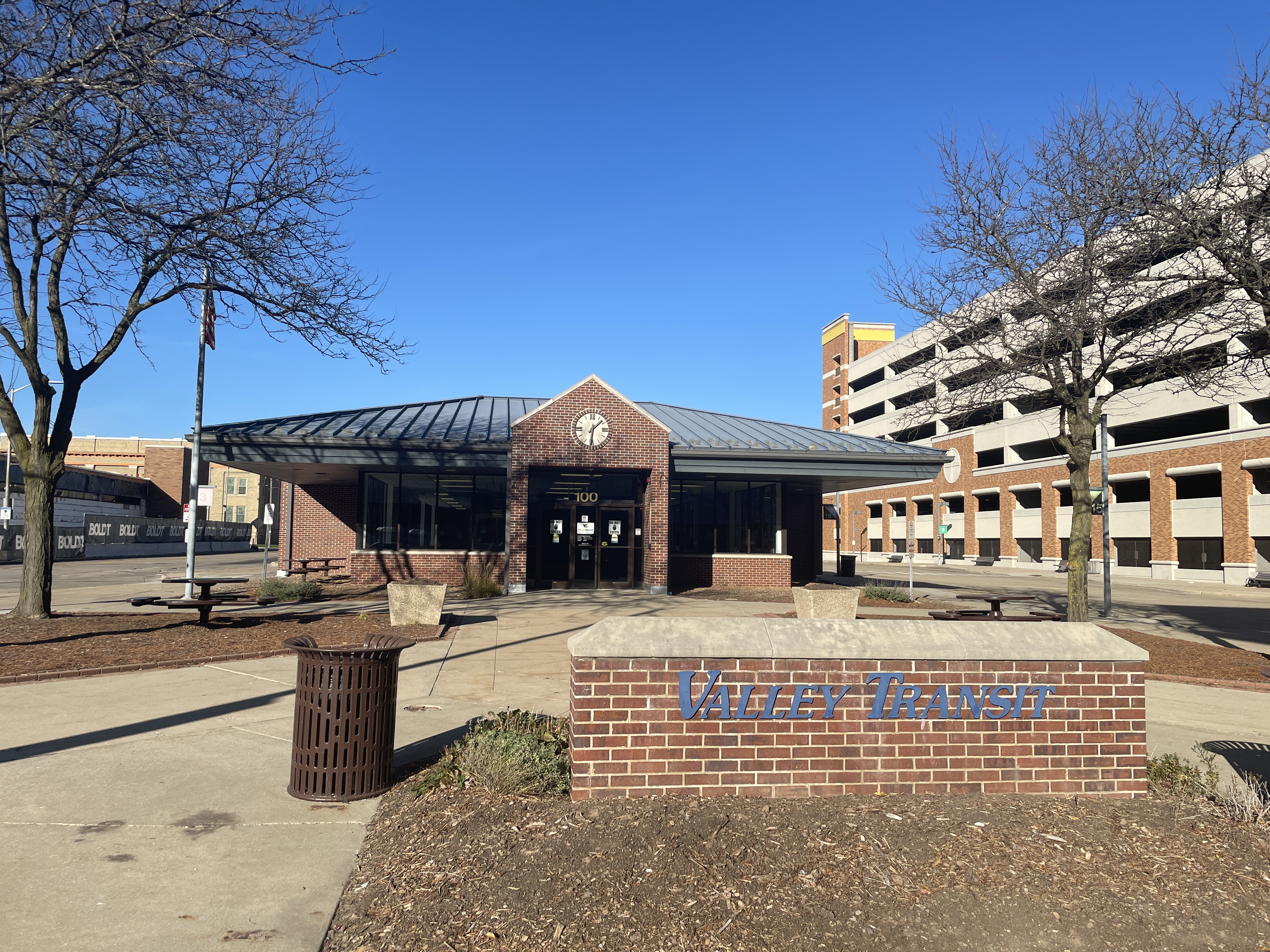
Appleton Transit Center with sign for Valley Transit in downtown Appleton

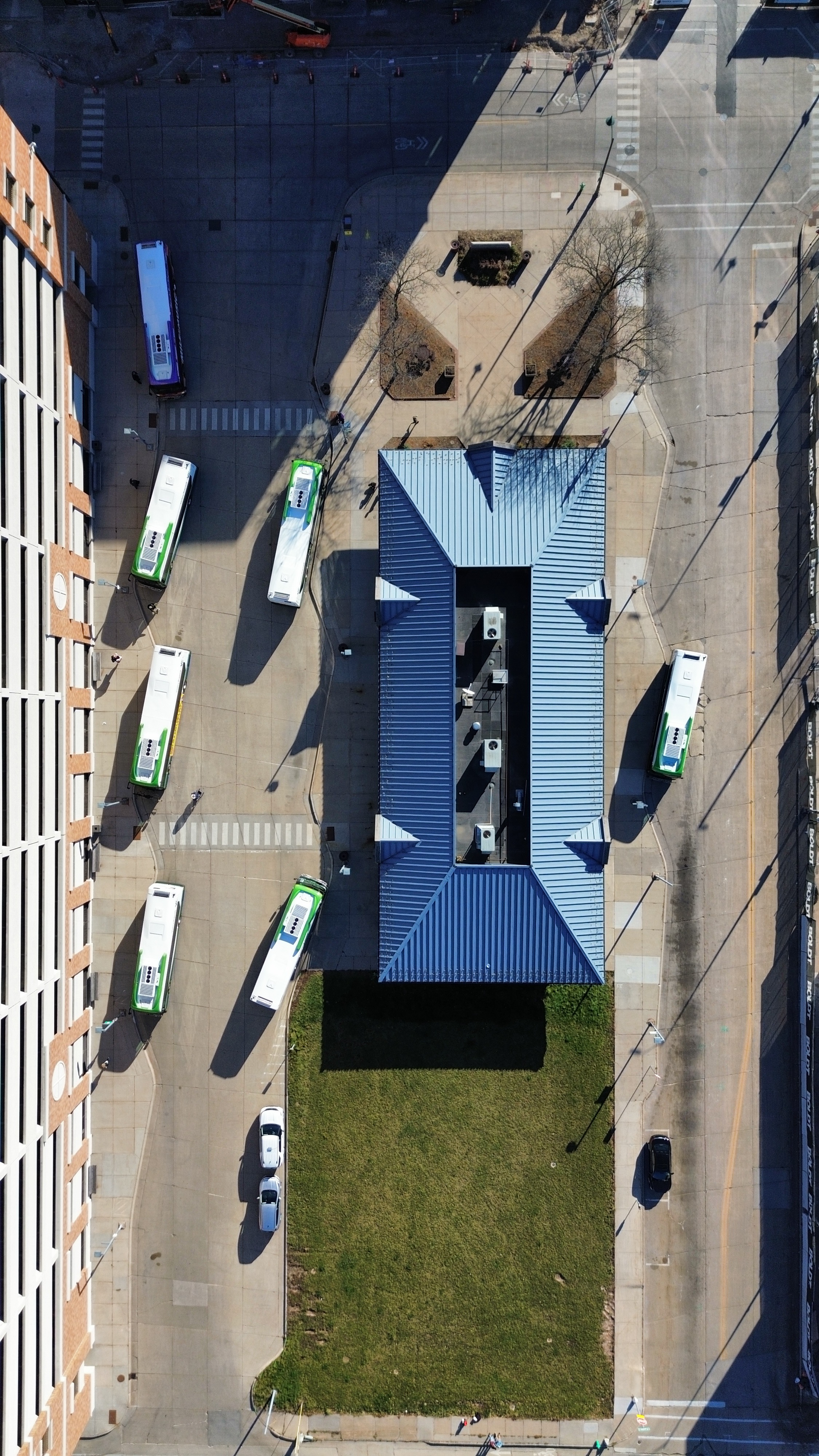
A view from above of the Appleton Transit Center with buses meeting during the hourly pulse period.

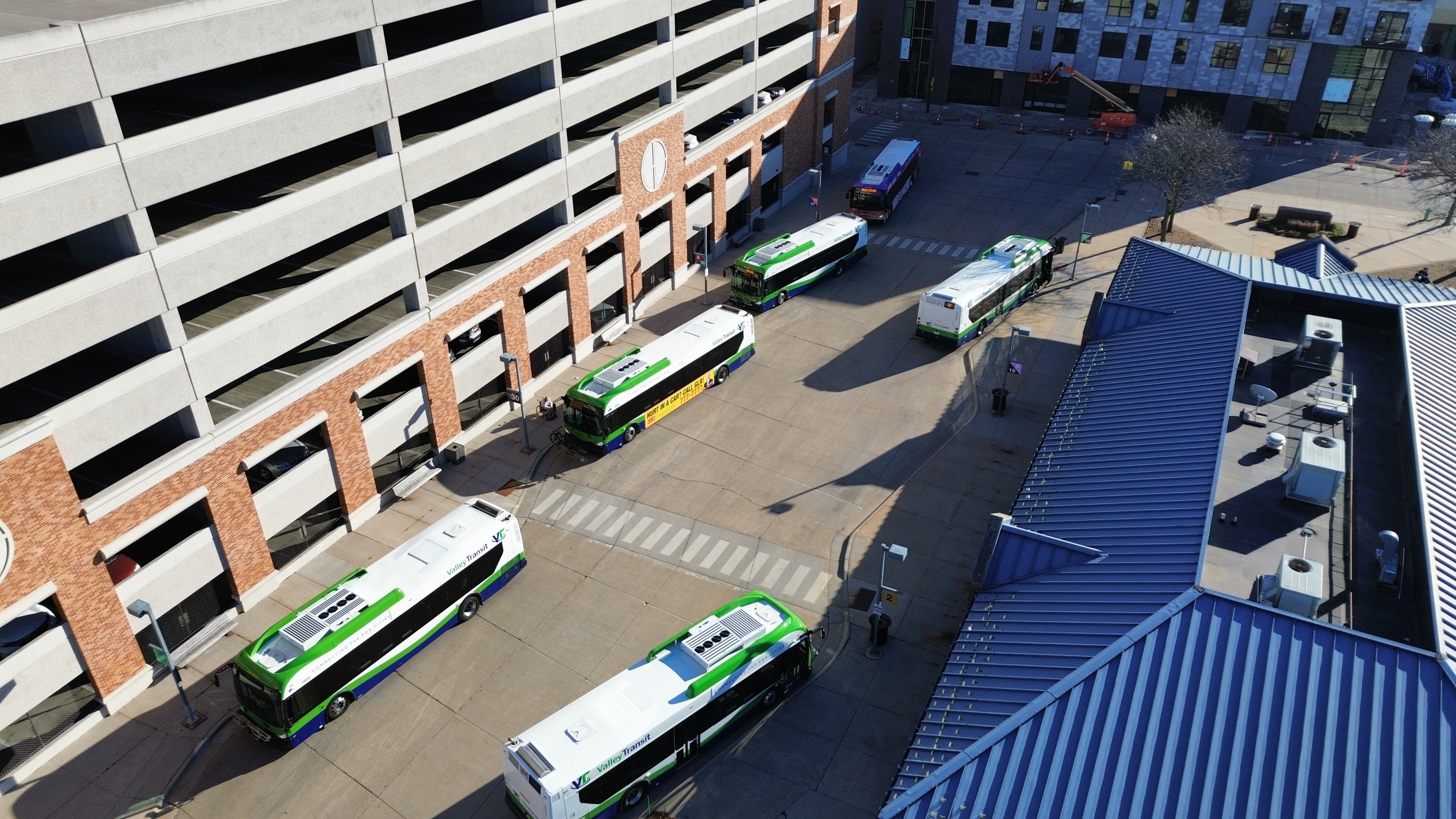
Valley Transit buses laying over at Appleton Transit Center

== See also ==
- Valley Transit
