= Evan Beerntsen =

American football player (born 2000)

No. 64 – Philadelphia Eagles
- Position: Guard
- Roster status: Practice squad

Personal information
- Born: September 19, 2000 (age 26); Green Bay, Wisconsin, U.S.
- Listed height: 6 ft 3 in (1.91 m)
- Listed weight: 302 lb (137 kg)

Career information
- High school: Appleton North (Appleton, Wisconsin)
- College: South Dakota State (2019–2024); Northwestern (2025)
- NFL draft: 2026: 7th round, 253rd overall pick

Career history
- Baltimore Ravens (2026)*; Seattle Seahawks (2026)*; Philadelphia Eagles (2026–present)*
- * Offseason or practice squad member only
- Stats at Pro Football Reference

Evan Beerntsen (born September 19, 2000) is an American professional football guard for the Philadelphia Eagles of the National Football League (NFL). He played college football for the South Dakota State Jackrabbits and the Northwestern Wildcats and he was selected by the Baltimore Ravens in the seventh round of the 2026 NFL draft.

== Early life ==
Beerntsen attended Appleton North High School. As a senior, he earned first-team all-Valley Football Association honors. Beerntsen was considered a zero-star recruit and had no Division 1 FBS offers.

== College career ==
Beerntsen spent six seasons at South Dakota State and redshirted a year due to a shoulder injury. He was a starter on FCS national championship teams in 2022 and 2023. In 2024, he earned First Team All-MVFC honors. After the NCAA granted an additional year of eligibility, Beerntsen transferred to the Northwestern Wildcats. He started 13 games and allowed no sacks and quarterback hits. Beerntsen was named Honorable Mention All-Big Ten.

== Professional career ==
Pre-draft measurables
Height	Weight	Arm length	Hand span	Wingspan	40-yard dash	10-yard split	20-yard split	20-yard shuttle	Three-cone drill	Vertical jump	Broad jump	Bench press
6 ft 3 1/2 in (1.92 m)	301 lb (137 kg)	32 1/8 in (0.82 m)	9 3/8 in (0.24 m)	6 ft 6 7/8 in (2.00 m)	5.25 s	1.82 s	3.03 s	4.80 s	7.65 s	32.5 in (0.83 m)	8 ft 9 in (2.67 m)	22 reps
All values from NFL Combine/Pro Day

=== Baltimore Ravens ===
Beerntsen was selected in the seventh round of the 2026 NFL draft with the 253rd-overall pick by the Baltimore Ravens. On August 30, Beerntsen was waived by the Ravens.

=== Seattle Seahawks ===
On September 14, 2026, Beerntsen signed with the Seattle Seahawks' practice squad. He was released on October 21.

=== Philadelphia Eagles ===
On October 28, 2026, Beerntsen signed with the Philadelphia Eagles practice squad.
