= William Beverly Murphy =

American food businessman

William Beverly Murphy (June 17, 1907 – May 29, 1994) was an American food businessman. He was the president and CEO of Campbell Soup Company between 1953 and 1972. From 1942 to 1945 he was on leave from Campbell's Soup to the War Production Board. Prior to joining Campbell's Soup he was at the A.C. Nielsen Company (1928–1938) where he is credited with conceiving the idea for the Nielsen Food Index and Nielsen Drug Index Services. Murphy was also a life member emeritus of the MIT Corporation (Massachusetts Institute of Technology).

== Life ==
Murphy was born in Appleton, Wisconsin, and received a Bachelor of Science in chemical engineering from the University of Wisconsin in 1928. He subsequently joined the A.C. Nielsen Company of Chicago and rose to the position of executive vice president. He joined Campbell Soup in 1938 as Assistant to General Manager. Murphy was elected executive vice president of Campbell Soup in 1949 and was president and CEO from 1953 to 1972. Murphy died May 29, 1994, at the age of 86 of pneumonia in a convalescent home in Bryn Mawr, Pennsylvania.

While at Campbell's Soup Company he took the corporation public and increased its brand portfolio to include Pepperidge Farm breads, cookies, and crackers, Franco-American gravies and pastas, V8 juice (vegetable), Swanson broths, and Godiva (chocolatier).

Murphy was a special term member of the MIT Corporation from 1961–65 and a life member from 1965–82. He served on several MIT standing committees, including the Auditing Committee (1984–86), the Executive Committee (1966–72 and 1976–82), and the Membership Committee (1964–67). He was a member of the visiting committees for the Department of Applied Biological Sciences (1985–88), the Department of Nutrition and Food Science (1980–85 and 1974–80 as chairman), the MIT Sloan School of Management (1972–76 and 1965–66, and 1964–65 as chairman), and the School of Industrial Management (1961–63, 1963–64 as chairman and 1959–61 as a presidential nominee).

As head of Campbell Soup, Murphy's managerial style, which prioritized lean manufacturing, fostered conflict with his workers who contested his high production targets. The climax of this conflict occurred in 1968, when the AFL-CIO affiliated locals at the Campbell plants attempted to coordinate their contracts. Murphy firmly opposed the coordinated bargaining across his plants; divisions between the different locals limited their gains, and his managerial vision prevailed.

In 1980, former president and chairman of the MIT Corporation Paul Gray presented Murphy with the Henry Laurence Gantt Memorial Medal. It is awarded jointly by the American Management Associations and the American Society of Mechanical Engineers for "distinguished achievement in management as a service to the community."

In addition to serving on several government advisory panels, Murphy was a director of companies including AT&T, Merck & Co., Inc., and International Paper. He also served as national chairman of Radio Free Europe in 1960–61 and as chairman of the board of trustees of the Nutrition Foundation in 1964–65.

== Employment ==
- A.C. Nielsen Company (ACNielsen), Chicago, Illinois, 1928–1938
  - Executive Vice President, 1935–1938
- Campbell Soup Company, Camden, New Jersey, 1938–1980
  - Assistant to General Manager, 1938–1941
  - On leave to War Production Board, 1942–1945
  - Executive Assistant to President, 1946–1948
  - Executive Vice President, 1949–1953
  - President and Chief Executive Officer, March 1953 – June 1972
  - Director, 1950–1980
- War Production Board, 1942–1945
  - Director, Facilities Division

== Education ==
- Grade School — First Ward School, Appleton, Wisconsin, 1913–1920
- High School — Appleton West High School, 1920–1924
- College — University of Wisconsin, 1924–1928
  - B.S. in Chemical Engineering
  - Tau Beta Pi (honorary scholastic engineering society)
  - Iron Cross (honorary senior activities society)
  - Delta Upsilon (social fraternity)
  - "W" Club (Major letter winner in track)

== Directorships ==
- American Telephone & Telegraph Company (AT&T), 1961–1978
- Merck & Co., Inc., 1959–1980
- International Paper, 1969–1980

== Charitable and civic activities ==
- Wisconsin Alumni Research Foundation
  - Trustee, 1958–?
  - President, 1982–1986
- Bryn Mawr Presbyterian Church
  - Trustee, 1959–1961
  - Elder, 1964–1966
  - Advance Gifts Chairman, Every member Canvass, 1963–1964
  - Co-Chairman, Expanding Ministries and Building Fund Drive, 1964–1965
- Massachusetts Institute of Technology
  - Life Member, 1961–1982
  - Executive Committee, 1966–1972; 1976–1984
  - Chairman, Visiting Committee for School of Nutrition and Food Science, 1975–1976
  - Vice Chairman, Development Committee, 1976–1981
- Academy of Natural Sciences
  - Trustee, 1968–1976
  - Honorary Trustee, 1976–?
  - Chairman, Executive Committee, 1974–1976
  - Chairman, Search Committee, 1975–1976
- Philadelphia Museum of Art
  - Trustee, 1972–?
  - Chairman, Capital Development Drive, 1971–1974
- First United Fund Campaign of Camden
  - Chairman, 1958
- Greater Camden Movement
  - Co-Chairman, 1968–1971
- Blue Hill Memorial Hospital, Blue Hill, Maine
  - Member, Investment Committee, 1980–?
- Philadelphia Society for Promoting Agriculture
  - President, 1985–1986
- Greater Philadelphia Movement
  - Chairman, Committee on Public School Education, 1973–1975
- Greater Philadelphia Partnership, 1976–?
- Afro-American Historical and Cultural Museum, Board of Directors, 1977

== Honorary degrees and awards ==
- U.S. Presidential Medal for Merit by President Harry S. Truman on recommendation of the Secretary of the Air Force, 1946
- Lawrence University, LLD, 1954
- Widener College (Widener University), LLD, 1960
- University of Wisconsin, LLD, 1963
- St. Joseph's College, LLD 1965
- Ursinus College, Sc.D., 1970
- Drexel University, Sc.D., 1970
- Rutgers University, LHD, 1973
- Fellow — American Association for the Advancement of Science, 1963
- Poor Richard Club Gold Medalist, 1966
- Herbert Hoover Award of National-American Wholesalers Grocers Association, 1966
- Pennsylvania Society Annual Award, 1967
- Supermarket Institute — William H. Albers Award, 1967
- Business Week Citizens Award, 1971
- Distinguished Service Citation College of Engineering, University of Wisconsin, 1957

== National organizations ==
- Business Council, 1960–?
  - Chairman, 1965–1966
- Nutrition Foundation, 1953–1972
  - Chairman, 1963–1964
  - Chairman, Committee on Program and Staffing, 1970–1971
- Business Roundtable, 1971–1973
  - Organized, 1971
  - Chairman, 1971–1973
- United Nations University, American Council, 1975–1976

== Other activities ==
- Radio Free Europe Fund, Chairman, 1960–1961
- Mexican-American Panel on Rural Development — panelist, 1965, sponsored by the National University of Mexico and The Advertising Council (Ad Council)
- National Advisory Commission on Rural Areas Development, 1966
- Colloque Franco-American Delegate, 1966–1967
- President's Advisory Committee on Labor-Management Policy, 1966–1968
- National Advisory Commission on Food and Fiber, 1966–1968
- President's Commission on Postal Organization, 1967–1968
- White House Conference on Food, Nutrition and Health, Chairman, Panel on Traditional Food, 1969
- President's Public Advisory Committee on Trade Policy, 1968–1969
- Member United Nations Association (UNA) — USA National Policy Panel on World Population, 1969
- U.S. Environmental Protection Agency, Hazardous Materials Advisory Committee, 1971–1972
- Woodrow Wilson National Fellowship Foundation, 1973–1974
- National Science Foundation — Northeast Region, Member, Planning Committee, 1978

== Family ==
- Parents-Stephen Waite and Hilma Anderson Murphy
- Wife-Helen Huston Brennan
- Children-Robert Blair Murphy, Ann M. Zabel, John H. Murphy, Eric S. Murphy
