= Appleton West High School =

Public high school in Appleton, Wisconsin

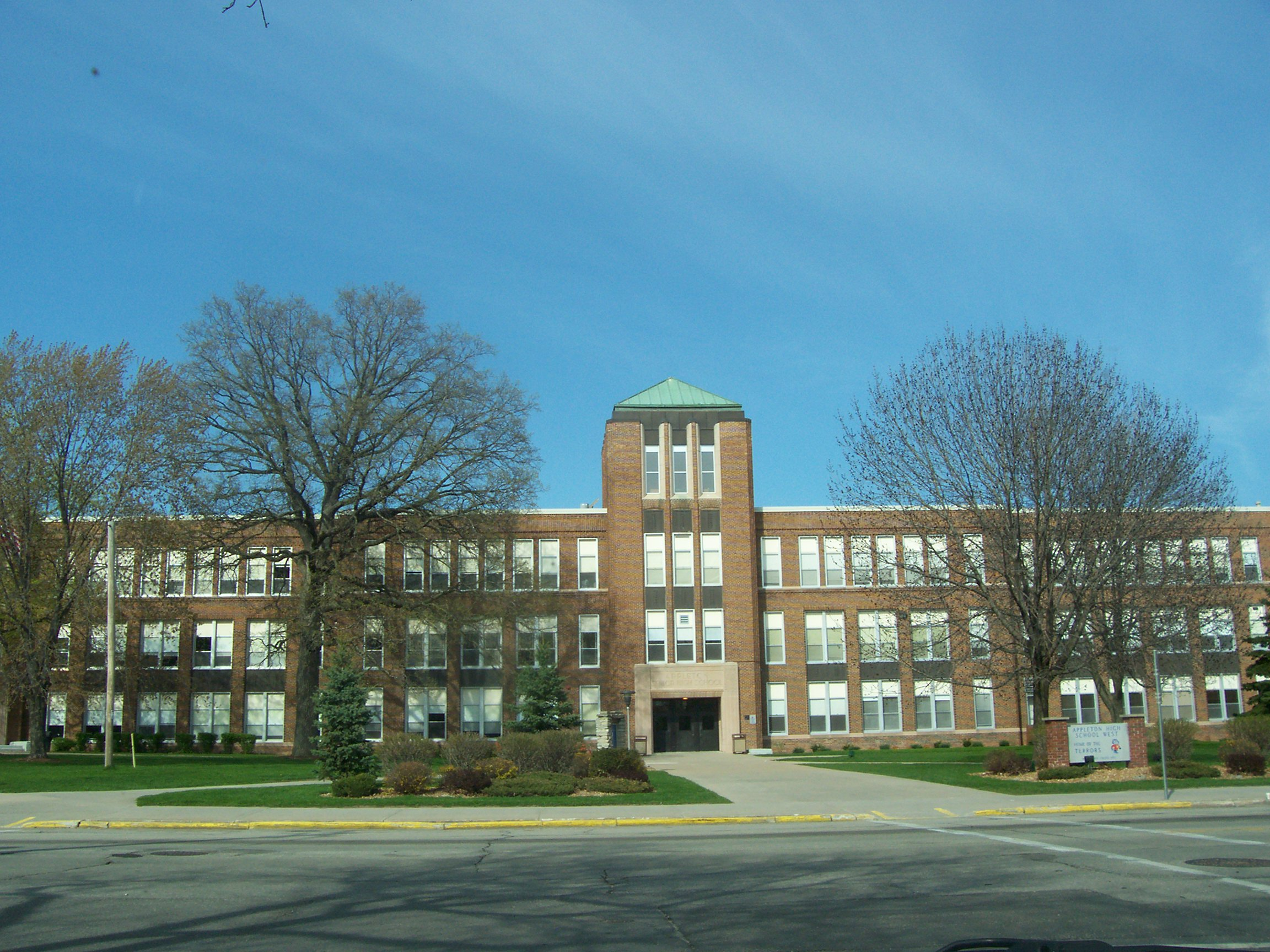

Location
- 610 North Badger Avenue; Appleton, Wisconsin 54914; United States; 44°16′6″N 88°25′43″W

Information
- Former name: Appleton Senior High
- Type: Public secondary
- Motto: Home of the Terrors
- Established: 1915 (relocated in 1938)
- School district: Appleton Area School District
- Principal: Joshua Chudacoff
- Teaching staff: 78.53 (on an FTE basis)
- Employees: 152
- Grades: 9–12
- Enrollment: 1,118 (2023–2024)
- Student to teacher ratio: 14.24
- Colors: Orange and Blue
- Slogan: West is Best
- Athletics conference: Fox Valley Association
- Mascot: The Terror
- Newspaper: The Talisman
- Yearbook: The Clarion
- Feeder schools: Einstein Middle School, Wilson Middle School, and Kaleidoscope Academy
- Website: west.aasd.k12.wi.us

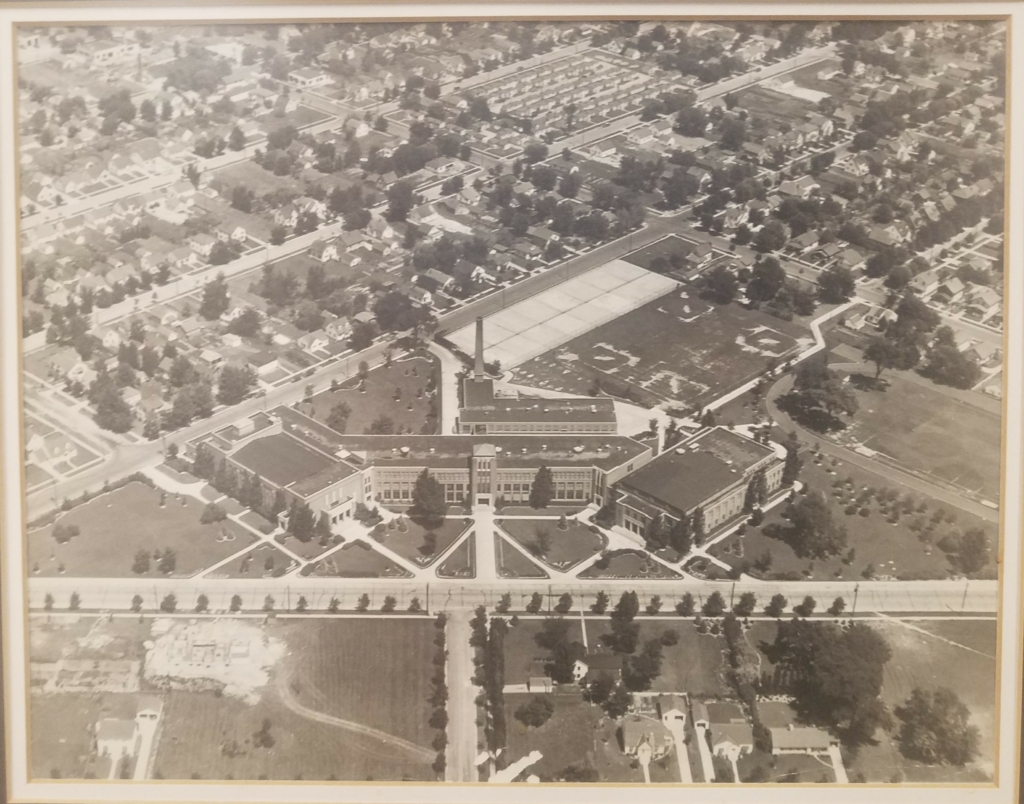
Aerial view of Appleton West High School taken January 12, 1937.

Appleton West High School (or AWHS, formerly known as Appleton Senior High School or Appleton High School) is a comprehensive public secondary school located in Appleton, Wisconsin that serves students in the ninth through twelfth grades. The school was founded in 1915 under the name Appleton Senior High School, but the current facility was constructed in 1938, and the name was changed to West High in 1967 following the construction of Appleton East High School. The current principal is Joshua Chudacoff.

One of the three public four-year high schools in the Appleton Area School District (AASD), West High also offers two charter academies: Appleton Technical Academy (A-TECH) and the Renaissance School of the Arts (RSA). These institutions are fully accredited by the Wisconsin Department of Public Instruction. Appleton West is also a member of the Fox Valley Association athletic conference.

Appleton West received the Wisconsin RtI Center School of Distinction Award for three years in a row from 2014 to 2016; as of the 2019–20 school year, they remain recognized for behavior and merit. According to the Fox Valley Association, 40 students of West High have been given a "Student-Athlete Spotlight" for excellent performance since the 2014–15 school year.

As of the 2019–20 school year, West High had an enrollment of 1,336 students and 69.51 classroom teachers (on an FTE basis) for a student-teacher ratio of 19.22. There were 420 students (31.44% of students) eligible for free lunch and 86 (6.44% of students) eligible for reduced-cost lunch.

== History ==
In 1881, Ryan High School was constructed following the decision to unify Appleton into one school district (44.265262°N 88.405135°W). On January 26, 1904, Ryan High School was destroyed in a fire and rebuilt as Union High School in the same year, at the cost of $92,000 (~$2,690,700 today). In 1938, students were relocated to the newly built Appleton High School so that Union High School could become the Carrie E. Morgan Elementary School. In 1967, construction on Appleton East High School was completed, and Appleton High School would become West High as a result. In the same year, following the death of Carrie E. Morgan, the elementary school in her name would be converted into the Morgan Administration Building and, as of today, remains as such.

On March 13, 1970, an arson fire caused by a Molotov cocktail would set Appleton West ablaze, damaging one classroom and a faculty room as a result. Although a perpetrator was never caught, some believe that it had to do with a rise in political climate at the time, supported by similar happenings from radical activist movements such as the Weather Underground Organization and the Student Strike of 1970.

West High's mascot is the 'Terror', a fictional animal representing a genetic hybrid between a wolf and a fox, as the school is situated in between the Wolf and Fox Rivers. This mascot would be depicted for the first time in 1944 as an orange canine on a blue background, but would receive multiple redesigns in 1969, 1982, 1989, 1991, and 1993 until finally deciding on a minimalist design of a Terror head and the letters 'AW' in a vibrant orange and blue.

In August 2014, a new football stadium was built on school grounds, but lacked the proper seating requirements issued by the FVA. Home games were played at Lawrence University's Banta Bowl, as well as Neinhaus Field, Appleton North, Appleton East, and Einstein Middle School until the seating requirement was satisfied.

== Structure ==
=== Schedule ===
As of the 2024–25 school year, Appleton West has a school day that lasts from 7:55 AM to 3:30 PM. This period is cut into 9 45-minute-long periods, with 5-minute breaks between each period. The third block (from 9:37 to 10:24 AM) is reserved for individual student support, and students can sign up to meet with individual teachers during this time. Lunch is served from periods 3 to 6, and students' lunch hours vary based on their other classes.

=== Credit requirements ===
Following AASD standards and Wisconsin State Statute 118.33, students must earn 23 high school credits. This includes:

- English Language Arts (ELA) - 4.0 Credits
  - 1.0 ELA 9 or *ELA 9
  - 1.0 ELA 10 or *ELA 10
  - 1.0 ELA 11 Course Option
  - 1.0 ELA 12 Course Option
- Science - 3.0 Credits
  - 1.0 Physical Science
  - 1.0 Life Science
  - 1.0 Science Course Elective
- Social Studies - 3.0 Credits
  - 1.0 Civics
  - 1.0 World Studies
  - 1.0 U.S. History
- Mathematics - 3.0 Credits
- Physical Education - 1.5 Credits
  - 0.5 Freshman Physical Education
- Fine Arts - 1.0 Credit
  - "To include art, music, theatre, or humanities when not used for social studies."
- Health - 0.5 Credit
  - 0.5 Health
- Financial Literacy - 0.5 Credit
- Electives - 6.5 Credits

Students enrolled in A-TECH or RSA are provided methods to obtain credits in necessary fields. For students who are failing, at-risk, or unable to complete these standards in the required time, West High provides an alternative education program that allows students to gain credits through Edgenuity courses and independent/directed study programs.

== Extracurricular activities ==
=== Athletics ===
Appleton West currently provides football, baseball, basketball, tennis, golf, soccer, softball, swimming and diving, track and field, volleyball, wrestling and lacrosse as options for student athletes. It is typical for students to maintain a high GPA before being able to participate in athletic tryouts, practices, and events.

==== Football ====
In 1992, the varsity football team won the Division 1 State Championship.

==== Baseball ====
The baseball team has won the state title seven times (1975, 1976, 1982, 1988, 1991, 1995, and 2004).

==== Basketball ====
In the 1969–70 school year, the Appleton West Terrors, led by coach Richard Emanuel, won the WIAA Boys Basketball Tournament undefeated.

==== Lacrosse ====
Independent from the FVA, members of Appleton United Lacrosse are recruited from all three AASD high schools.

==== Athletic conference affiliation history ====
- Fox River Valley Conference (1923-1970)
- Fox Valley Association (1970–present)

=== Clubs ===
As of the 2019–20 school year, AWHS had over 35 clubs.

=== Fine Arts ===
The Appleton West Theatre, an all-student group, perform live shows to be presented in the West auditorium. Each year, a stage play is presented in the Fall, and a musical is presented in the Spring; students are invited to audition to perform or work as backstage crew members. As well as hosting daily rehearsals after school hours, the Appleton West Theatre constructs and paints their own sets from scratch over the weekends leading up to the opening day. All proceeds from ticket sales and concessions go back into the group budget for future events.

Appleton West Theatre Productions
| Year | Fall Show | Spring Show |
|---|---|---|
| 2025 - 26 | Fahrenheit 451 | Bye Bye Birdie |
| 2024 - 25 | Radium Girls | Something Rotten |
| 2023 - 24 | She Kills Monsters | Mean Girls |
| 2022 - 23 | The Play That Goes Wrong | We Will Rock You |
| 2021 - 22 | Puffs | How I Became a Pirate |
| 2020 - 21 | All shows canceled due to the COVID-19 pandemic | |
| 2019 - 20 | Arsenic and Old Lace | All Shook Up |
| 2018 - 19 | Night of the Living Dead | The Wizard of Oz |
| 2017 - 18 | 12 Angry Jurors | Seussical: The Musical |
| 2016 - 17 | Nineteen Eighty-Four | Once on this Island |
| 2015 - 16 | | Urinetown: The Musical |
| 2014 - 15 | | Pippin: The Musical |
| 2013 - 14 | | Little Shop of Horrors |

On February 4, 1978, the Appleton West Choral Department took first place at the St. Norbert Swing Choir Carnival.

== Notable alumni ==
- John Bradley, a United States Navy Hospital Corpsman and recipient of the Navy Cross, Purple Heart Medal, and Combat Action Ribbon for raising the first U.S. flag at Iwo Jima during World War II.
- Brian Butch, current radio color commentator for the Wisconsin Herd of the NBA G League and former professional basketball player for the 2003 McDonald's All-American Basketball Team.
- Donald Dafoe, current Chief of Transplantation Surgery at the University of California Irvine Medical Center, former Director of the Kidney and Pancreas Transplant Center, Director of Surgical Education, holder of the Eris M. Field Endowed Chair in Diabetes Research at the Cedars-Sinai Medical Center, and former medical director of the California Transplant Donor Network.
- John Francis Doerfler, current Bishop of the Roman Catholic Diocese of Marquette.
- Catherine Ebert-Gray, former United States Ambassador to Papua New Guinea, Vanuatu, and the Solomon Islands.
- Matt Erickson, professional baseball player for the Milwaukee Brewers.
- Daniel John Felton, current Bishop of the Roman Catholic Diocese of Duluth.
- Harold Vernon Froehlich, former Chief Judge of the Wisconsin Circuit Court, 66th Speaker of the Wisconsin State Assembly, Vice Chair of the Wisconsin Government Accountability Board, U.S. Congressman, and member of the House Judiciary Committee.
- Danny Jansen, professional baseball player for the Toronto Blue Jays.
- Josh Martinez, Singer & Song Writer, Likefinewine, Battlecoc
- William Beverly Murphy, former CEO of the Campbell's.
- David Prosser, Jr., former Justice of the Wisconsin Supreme Court.
- Kathi Seifert, former Executive Vice President of Kimberly-Clark.
- Brad Smith, current President and Chief Legal Officer of Microsoft.
- Brian Webber, Guitarist, Song Writer, Onus, Likefinewine, Vital Remains (Touring Guitarist).
