= Appleton Technical Academy =

Manufacturing based charter school located with-in Appleton West High School

- A-Tech

Location
- 610 North Badger Avenue; Appleton, Wisconsin 54914; United States
- 44°16′7″N 88°25′41″W

Information
- Type: Manufacturing Charter
- Established: 2013
- Founder: Jared Bailin and Greg Harjes
- School district: Appleton Area School District
- President: Ryan Scherer
- Principal: Josh Chudacoff
- Head teacher: Paul Endter
- Faculty: 5: 1 Full-Time; 4 Part-Time
- Grades: 9-12
- Enrollment: 84 (2021-2022 School Year)
- Hours in school day: Grade 9; 2 Hours; Grade 10; 4 Hours; Grades 11 and 12; 7 Hours; (The remaining hours are spent at Appleton West High School)
- Classrooms: 6
- Campus: Appleton West High School
- Feeder to: Fox Valley Technical College
- Website: appletontech.org

Appleton Technical Academy, more commonly known as ATECH, is a public charter school with a focus on developing the skills necessary for successful entry into the modern advanced manufacturing workforce. The school was created as a result of the growing number of manufacturing jobs that need to be filled in Wisconsin, as baby boomers retire. The school was established at the end of 2013 and the first day of classes was on September 2, 2014. In the first three years of operation the school reported giving out over 250 college credits.

The school gives students the ability to earn up to 24 college credits at the nearby Fox Valley Technical College which can be transferred to a 4-year college. This results in the student saving money on tuition as well as completing the first 8 months of most programs while still being in high school.

ATECH is a part-time school for ninth and tenth graders and a full-time school for 11th and 12th graders. 11th and 12th graders pick a focus area depending on their interests, including welding, machining, automated manufacturing, and mechanical design.

== History ==
The idea of the school came when Jared Bailin, the president of Eagle Plastics came to Greg Hartjes with the concern that there was a need for people to fill jobs, but also develop the skills needed to successfully work in the shop environment daily; a planning board was formed shortly after. The board was given a grant shortly after its formation to plan the school by the WDPI.

=== Shop renovation ===
In the summer of 2014, a referendum was passed by the Appleton Area School District, providing funding to renovate many of their buildings with much of this being contributed to remodeling the shops at Appleton West High School. As part of the renovations, the whole Tech-Ed wing was gutted completely and rebuilt. New equipment was purchased that resembles the equipment widely found out in the workforce.

In Fall 2024, The Lab sponsored by Amcor, was opened. The first of its kind lab in the area focuses on automation and manufacturing. Students can earn certifications and skills in AC/DC electrical systems, electrical relays, FANCU robotics, pneumatics, drive systems, and Programmable Logical Controls (PLCs).

== Typical schedule ==
The typical day at ATech consists of nine periods, the amount of time spent in the charter depends on grade level.

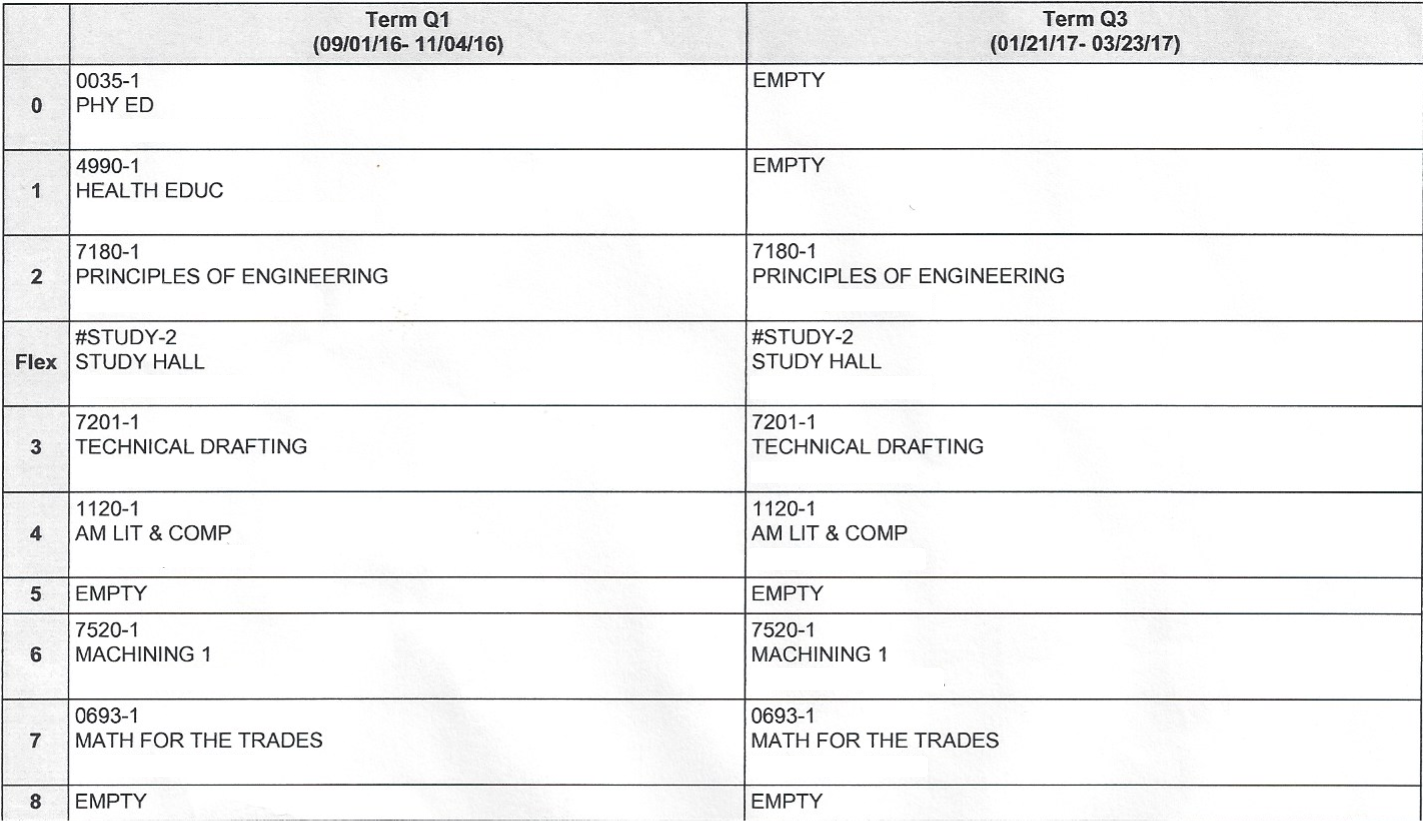
Digital copy of paper schedule given to a student

== Awards ==
On October 21, 2015, the school was presented the "Brighter Image" Award by the NEW Manufacturing Alliance. The Brighter Image is presented for excellence in manufacturing/K12 partnerships.
