= Appleton East High School =

Public high school in Wisconsin

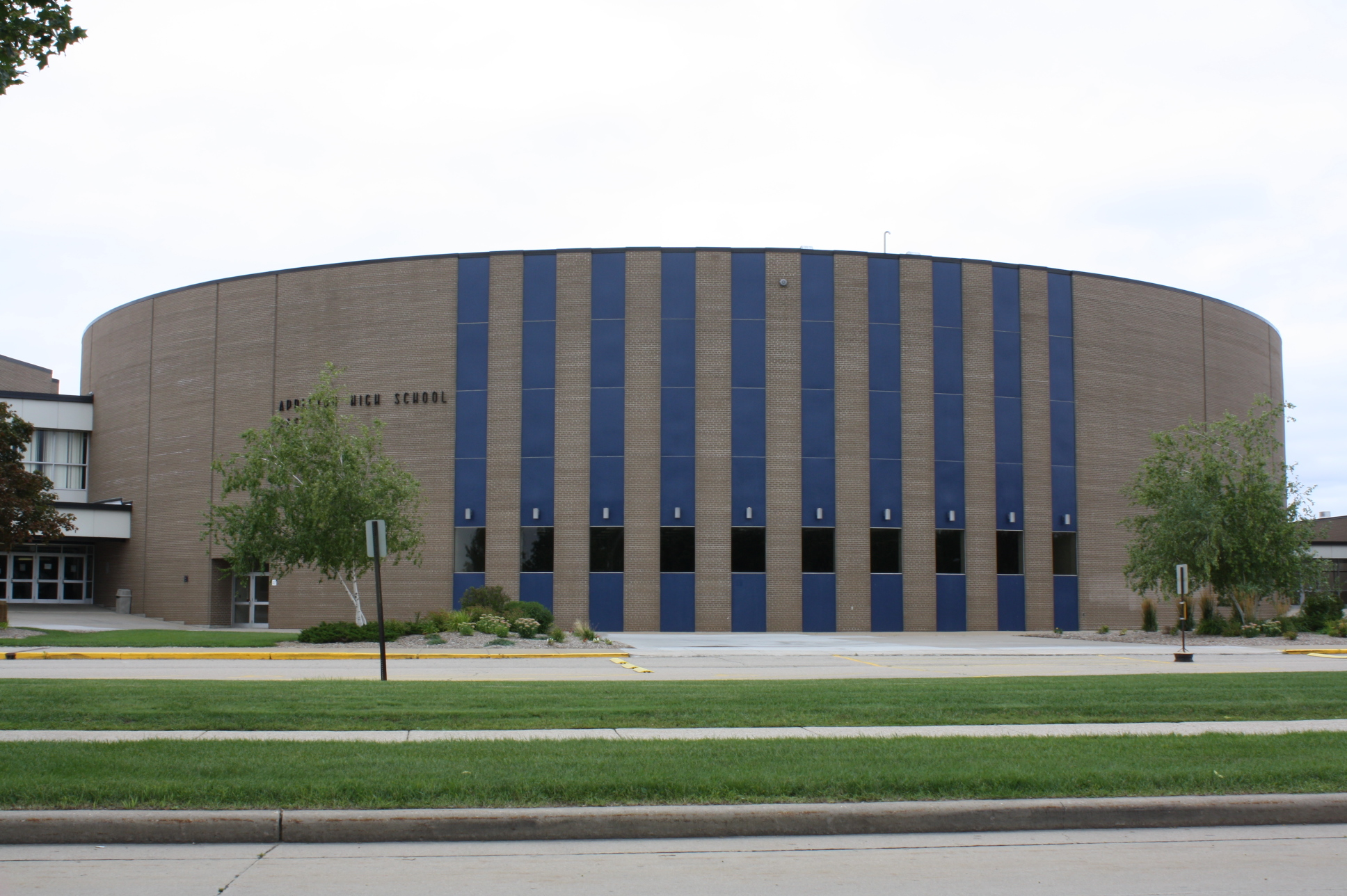

Location
- Appleton, Wisconsin; United States; 44.24758°N 88.37356°W

Information
- Type: Public secondary
- Motto: Learn Today, Create Our Tomorrow
- Established: 1958
- School district: Appleton Area School District
- Principal: Jaquline Smedberg
- Teaching staff: 85.87 (FTE)
- Grades: 9–12
- Enrollment: 1,327 (2023-2024)
- Student to teacher ratio: 15.45
- Color
- Mascot: Patriots
- Newspaper: The Courier
- Yearbook: The Lantern
- Feeder schools: Madison Middle School
- Website: east.aasd.k12.wi.us

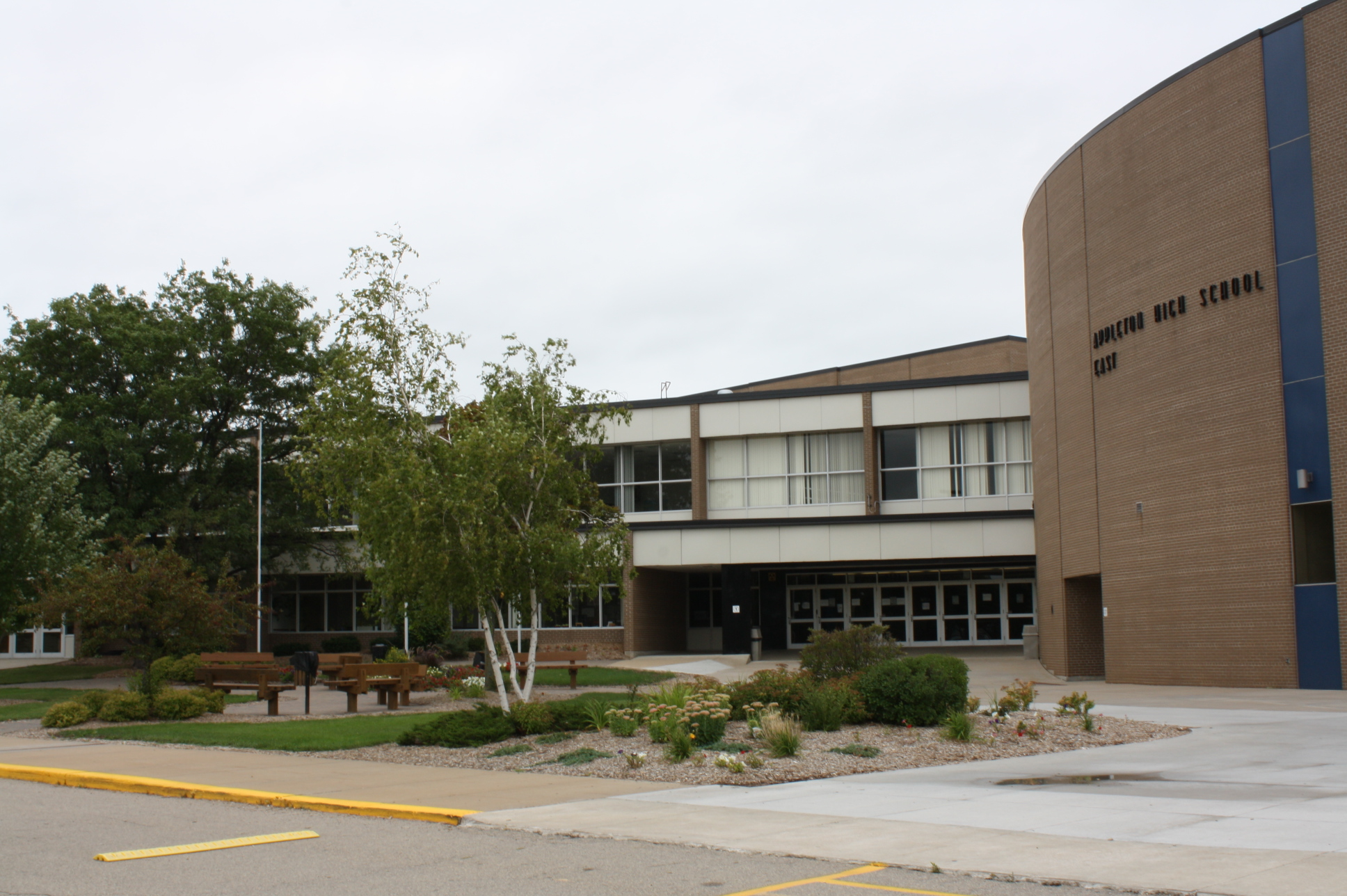
Pedestrian mall

Appleton East High School is a comprehensive secondary school located in Appleton, Wisconsin. Part of the Appleton Area School District, the school is one of three public four-year high schools in the city. It is accredited by the North Central Association of Colleges and Secondary Schools and by the Wisconsin Department of Public Education. The school calendar consists of two 18-week semesters. The school is in the Fox Valley Association sports conference.

== Architecture ==
East High School is constructed around a three-story circular "silo".

=== Charters At East ===
Tesla Engineering Charter School.

== Extracurricular activities ==
=== Athletics ===
==== Boys' basketball ====
The boys' basketball team had winning seasons in three consecutive years during the mid-2000s: 2005, 2006, and 2007. In 2010, the team defeated De Pere High School, and went to the state tournament for the first time since 1996. In the 2010–2011 season, the Patriots went undefeated in the regular season, ranked number one and became sectional champions by defeating Germantown. They went on to state, earning 3rd, ending the year with an overall record of 26–1.

==== Cross country and track and field ====
Appleton East won a state championship in boys cross country in 1972.

Appleton East cross country and track and field coach Joe Perez was inducted into the Wisconsin Cross Country Coaches Hall of Fame in 1998.

==== Conference affiliation history ====
- Fox River Valley Conference (1967-1970)
- Fox Valley Association (1970-present)

=== Debate ===
The Appleton East debate team won the state championship in policy debate and Congressional debate in the 2012–2013 season. Appleton East also had a teams in the semifinals and the quarterfinals of the WDCA state tournament in the 2012–2013 season. Appleton East is also the only team ever in WDCA history to have teams in all 3 divisions of debate in elimination rounds at the state tournament. In the 2011–2012 season they were the runner up in policy debate. In the 2018–2019 season and the 2019–2020 season, the Appleton East debate team won the state tournament in Lincoln Douglas debate.

=== DECA ===
The Appleton East DECA Chapter is responsible for beginning the Big Apple Classic in November 2009. The Classic is an annual two-day basketball charity event held over Thanksgiving break.

=== FIRST Robotics ===
Appleton East is home to NEW Apple Corps Robotics (FIRST Robotics Competition Team 93), which is composed of students from Appleton East, Appleton North and Appleton West High Schools. Any student from an Appleton Area School District high school, charter school, or home school is eligible to join.

=== Forensics ===
Appleton East Forensics team won state titles from 1992 through 1997, and in 1999. It won the Wisconsin state championship in the Wisconsin Forensics Coaches Association Tournament of 2005 and 2013, and the co-championship with James Madison Memorial High School in 2006. The Appleton East Forensics and Debate programs won the Bruno E. Jacobs award at the 2012 National Forensic League National Tournament in Indianapolis.

== Notable alumni ==
- Gary Arndt - travel writer and photographer
- Christine Boskoff - mountaineer
- Nate Cote - Business Professional
- Willem Dafoe - American film and stage actor; attended but did not graduate
- Steven Hyden - music critic
- Erik Jensen - professional football player
- Steve Kagen - Former U.S. Congressman (D-WI 08)
- Hayden Knight - professional soccer player
- Michael Patrick McGill - actor
- Reid Ribble - Former U.S. Congressman (R-WI 08)
- Erik M. Ross - U.S. Navy admiral
- David Schutter - Attorney and activist
- Don Werner - professional baseball player
