= Kathi Seifert =

American businesswoman

Kathi P. Seifert is an American businesswoman. Both Forbes magazine and Fortune magazine have included her in their lists of the most powerful women in business.

== Biography ==
Seifert completed her bachelor's degree in marketing and management at Valparaiso University in Indiana in 1971. Following her graduation, she worked for Procter & Gamble doing marketing research. She took on a marketing job with Fort Howard Paper. On March 27, 1978, she was approached by Kimberly Clark and she began her career with the company by selling paper goods to motels and other businesses. Two years later she began marketing consumer products for the company, and in 1991 she became the executive vice president for Kimberly Clark, one of the highest paid officers in the company. She managed Kimberly Clark's global personal care business. Seifert retired from Kimberly Clark in 2004.

Since 2004, Seifert has been the chairwoman of the consulting firm Pinnacle Perspectives, LLC. She has been a Director of Revlon Inc. since 2006. Seifert serves on the board of directors for SuperValu, as a member of the Executive Personnel and Compensation Committee and the Audit Committee. She also serves on the board of directors for Eli Lilly and Company, on the Audit and Public Policy and Compliance committees.

Seifert received an honorary Doctorate from the University of Wisconsin-Oshkosh in 2014.
