= Roy Purdy =

American entertainer

- Born: 1998 (age 27–28); Appleton, Wisconsin, U.S.
- Genres: Hip hop; trap
- Years active: 2016–present

Roy Purdy (born 1998) is an American rapper, dancer, YouTuber, and skateboarder. Purdy's first viral video was a 2016 Running Man Challenge set in his high school. He has released several singles, including Walk It out! and Oh Wow. Purdy is known for his pink and green sunglasses and overall use of 1980s fashion. Purdy's YouTube channel has 2.99 million subscribers as of May 2025.

== Career ==
Purdy's first viral release was a Running Man Challenge video posted on his YouTube channel in May 2016. One month afterwards, his video "when u graduated af" went viral, featuring Purdy dabbing during his high school graduation ceremony.

Since his debut, Purdy has released a number of music videos through his YouTube channel and other platforms, including SoundCloud and Spotify. His style has been described as "smooth" and "Asher Roth-like."

Purdy toured with Yung Gravy in April 2018 and was signed in 2017 by inArtists & by CAA in 2018.

== Discography ==
=== Singles ===
Title	Year
"When We Were Just Kids"	2015
"Guacamole"	2016
"Pink and Green"	2017
"Livin These Days"	2017
"Walk It out!"	2018
"Oh Wow"	2018
"Money On You" (with The Americanos)	2018
"Soda Pop"	2019
"DirtyVansFreestyle" (with IshDARR)	2024
"OneThisYear"	2024
"Brain Vacation"	2025
"Lyrical Miracle One Take"	2025
"Let The Party Begin"	2025
"Blueberry Bracelet"	2025
"Back Again"	2025
"Angels At Play"	2026
"DirtyVans DirtyMix"	2026
"LastCall"	2026
"Good Day"	2026
"Count It uP!"	2026
"Get This Shit Poppin"	2026
"Japan!"	2026
"Take a Trip!"	2026
"Off Rip!"	2026
