= Appleton North High School =

Public high school in Appleton, Wisconsin

Location
- 5000 North Ballard Road; Appleton, Wisconsin 54913; United States; 44.31383°N 88.3733°W

Information
- Type: Public secondary
- Established: 1995
- Oversight: Appleton Area School District
- Principal: Nathan Werner
- Teaching staff: 90.72 (FTE)
- Grades: 9-12
- Enrollment: 1,612 (2023–2024)
- Student to teacher ratio: 17.77
- Colors: Navy and Gold
- Fight song: Across the Field
- Athletics conference: Fox Valley Association
- Mascot: Lightning
- Newspaper: The Noctiluca
- Yearbook: The Almanack
- Feeder schools: Einstein Middle School and Kaleidoscope Academy
- Website: north.aasd.k12.wi.us

Appleton North High School is a comprehensive secondary school in Appleton, Wisconsin that is part of the Appleton Area School District. Opened in August 1995, it is the most recently built of the three four-year public high schools in the district. The school has 1,780 students. The school colors are gold, silver and navy blue. The school's nickname is the Lightning.

== Extracurricular activities ==
=== Theater ===
Appleton North High School Theatre has received wide recognition for its productions. In 2025, the department's one-act production of Arabian Nights received the Critic's Choice award at the Wisconsin High School Theatre Festival state finals, marking the 26th consecutive year that Appleton North's theater program received this accolade. In 2012, the program was named the best high school theater program in the midwest by Stage Directions magazine. Program director Ron Parker was inducted into the Wisconsin High School Theatre Hall of Fame in 2011.

=== Choir ===
Appleton North has six choirs. North Choir, an auditioned ensemble, tours internationally, and all choirs perform several concerts a year, including a benefit concert and the popular holiday program Wintersong. Under the direction of James Heiks, the Varsity Women's (now Varsity Treble) choir premiered Stephen Hatfield's arrangement of "Barb'ry Ellen" and was selected to appear on the album Best of High School A Cappella 2003.

=== Newspaper ===
The Noctiluca is Appleton North's award-winning student newspaper, in publication since 1995. Approximately 40 students contribute to the monthly publication.

== Athletics ==
During the 2004 football season Appleton North went undefeated in the regular season until losing to Marshfield in the postseason. The class of 2006 was the first class in history to defeat Appleton East and West all four years in football. During the 2009-2010 football regular season, Appleton North went undefeated. They were the first team in school history to go 12–1. During the 2011-2012 football season, the Lightning were the FVA champions, advancing to the playoffs, where they lost to DC Everest. In the 2021 football season, Appleton North completed their regular season with a record of 7–2 before advancing to the playoffs where they defeated Kimberly and lost to Franklin High School in the semi-final game. These were the two teams they lost to during the regular season.

=== Hockey ===
The Appleton United hockey teams are composed of students from North, East and West.

In the 2007–08 season, the boys' team went to the state tournament for the first time, before losing to Edgewood High School of the Sacred Heart in the semifinals. In the 2015–16 season, Appleton United won the state championship.

During its 2006-2007 inaugural season, the Appleton United Women's hockey team won sectionals and went to the state tournament, eventually defeating Chippewa Falls 4–2 in the championship game.

=== Performance team ===
In 2009, the performance team won first place in the National Dance Association's Medium Poms division. In 2016, the team won first place in their division at the Wisconsin State Cheer Championships.

=== Girls' basketball ===
The Lightning captured their first WIAA Division 1 state title in the 2016–17 season, when they beat De Pere to complete an undefeated season. Their second state victory came in the 2017–2018 season, against Kimberly High School.

=== Girls' soccer ===
During the 2008 soccer season, the varsity team went to the state tournament, where they lost to Divine Savior Holy Angels High School.

=== Boys' bowling ===
The Appleton North bowling team has been the reigning district 8A conference champ since 2013. In the 2016–2017 season, the team had two individual qualifiers for the singles portion, and three for the 2017–2018 season.

=== Boys' volleyball ===
The team completed a perfect season in 2012 (34-0) by defeating Burlington to claim their first boys' volleyball state championship.

=== Athletic conference affiliationhistory ===
- Fox Valley Association (1995–present)

== Notable alumni ==
- Evan Beerntsen, NFL guard for the Seattle Seahawks
- Cory Chisel, musician and founder of Mile of Music
- Sarah Hagen, soccer player
- Joe Hietpas, Major League Baseball player
- Roy Purdy, rapper, dancer, YouTuber, and skateboarder
- Amanda Stuck, Wisconsin State Representative
- Travis VanderZanden, founder of Bird Rides
