= Appleton Area School District =

Public school district for Appleton, Wisconsin

Address
- 131 E. Washington St. Suite 1A Appleton, Wisconsin, 54911; United States
- Coordinates: 44.26261°N 88.404793°W

District information
- Type: Public
- Motto: Success for Every Student, Every Day
- Grades: PK - 12
- President: Kay Eggert
- Vice-president: Kris Sauter
- Superintendent: Greg Hartjes
- Asst. superintendent(s): Steve Harrison; Nan Bunnow; Ebony Grice; Mike Hernandez; Sheree Garvey; Laura Jackson; Amy Steiner
- Schools: Elementary 15; Middle 3 High 3 Charter 14
- Budget: $231.8 million (2021-2022)
- NCES District ID: 5500390

Students and staff
- Students: 16,081
- Teachers: 1,047
- Staff: 1,671
- Student–teacher ratio: ~27:1
- Athletic conference: Fox Valley Association

Other information
- Schedule: M-F except state holidays
- Website: www.aasd.k12.wi.us

The Appleton Area School District, also known as AASD, is a school district that serves Appleton and Grand Chute, Wisconsin. Situated in the heart of the Fox River Valley of northeast Wisconsin, the AASD serves the city of Appleton and its nearly 75,000 residents. The Superintendent of Schools is Greg Hartjes and the current board president is Kay S. Eggert.

The Appleton Area School District serves 16,281 students in 15 elementary schools, 3 middle schools, 3 high schools and 14 recognized charter schools. The district spends $9,403 per pupil and has 16 students for every full-time equivalent teacher. It has a grades 9-12 dropout rate of 2.1% as of 2016.

== High schools (Grades 9-12) ==
- Appleton East High School
- Appleton North High School
- Appleton West High School

== Middle schools (Grades 6-8) ==
- Einstein Middle School
- Kaleidoscope Academy
- Madison Middle School
- Wilson Middle School

== Elementary schools (Grades 4K-5) ==
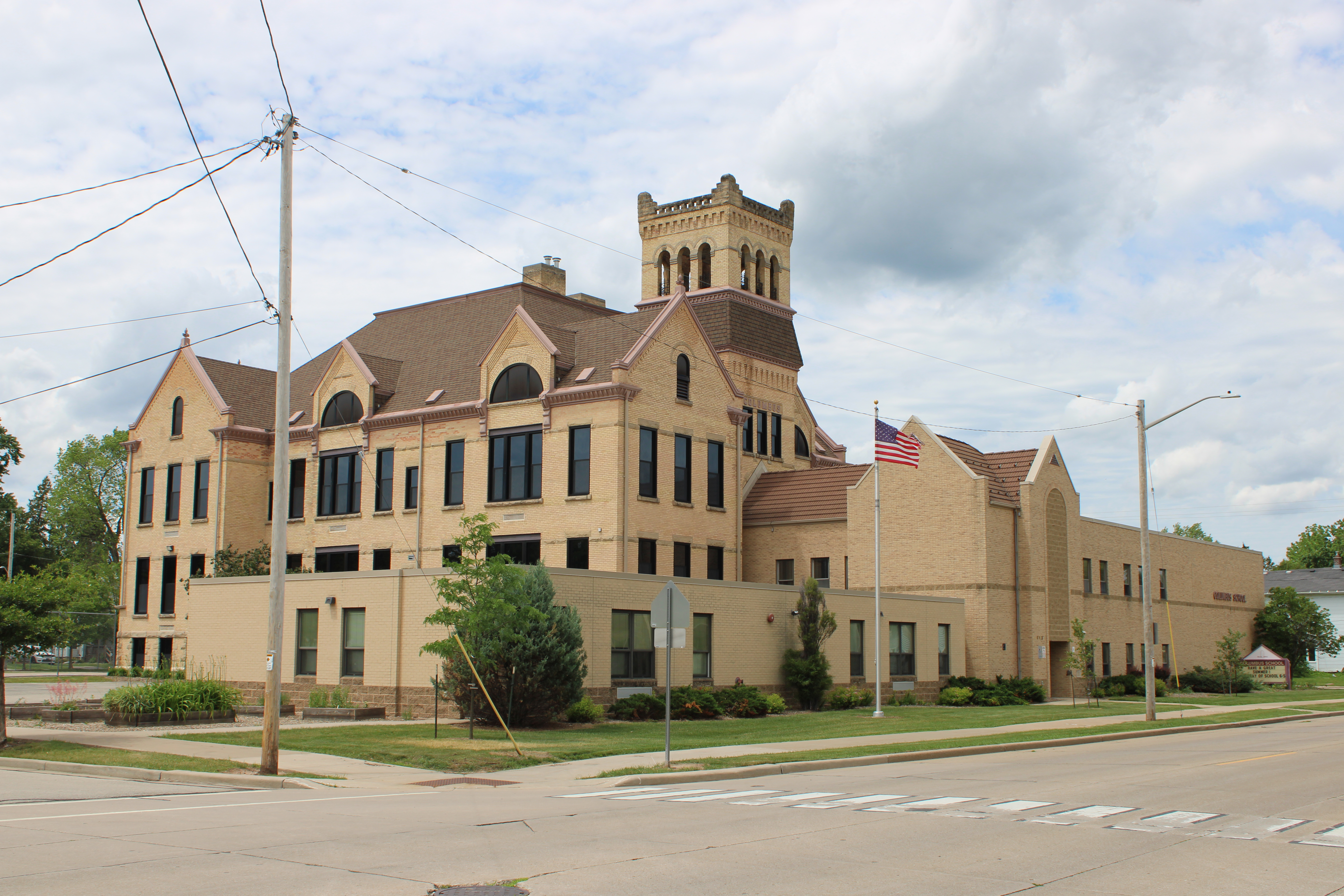
Columbus Elementary School

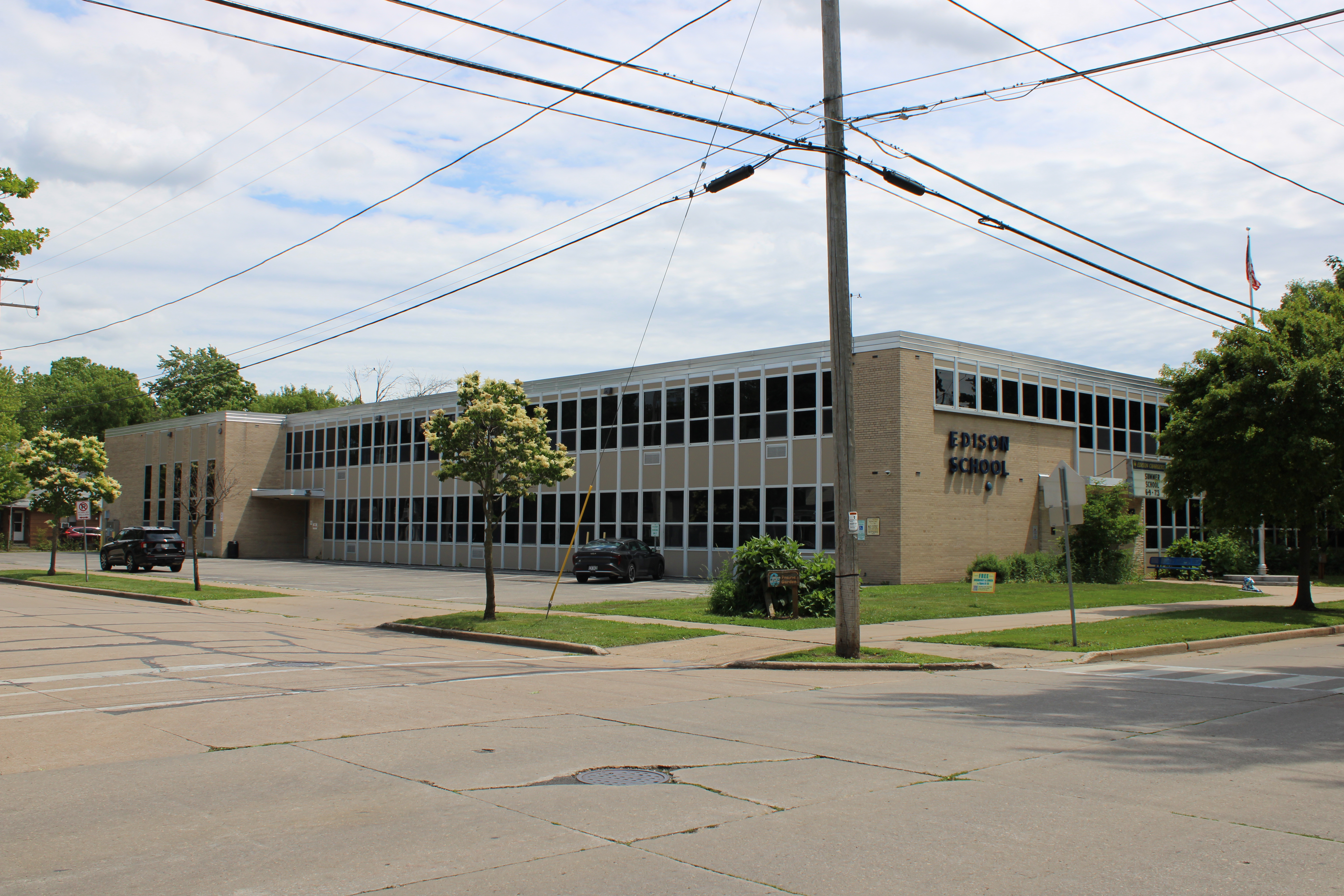
Edison Elementary School

- Appleton Community 4K
- Badger Elementary School
- Berry Elementary School
- Columbus Elementary School
- Edison Elementary School
- Ferber Elementary School
- Franklin Elementary School (1952)
- Highlands Elementary School
- Horizons Elementary School
- Houdini Elementary School (1988)
- Huntley Elementary School
- Jefferson Elementary School
- Johnston Elementary School
- Margaret Thatcher Elementary School
- McKinley Elementary School
- Richmond Elementary School
- Ronald C. Dunlap Elementary School, (originally Lincoln Elementary School) (1953)
- Sandy Slope Elementary
- Odyssey Elementary School (Magnets to Magellan Middle School)

== Charter schools ==
- Appleton Bilingual School
- Appleton eSchool (9-12)
- Appleton Public Montessori (4K-6)
- Appleton Technical Academy (9-12)
- Classical School (K-8)
- Fox Cities Leadership Academy
- Fox River Academy (K-8)
- Kaleidoscope Academy
- Renaissance School for the Arts (9-12)
- Stephen Foster Elementary Charter
- Tesla Engineering Charter School (9-12)
- Valley New School (7-12)
- Wisconsin Connections Academy (K-8)
- The Omolade Academy (K-6)

== Magnet schools ==
- Odyssey–Magellan Charter School (2-8)
  - Odyssey is at Highlands, Magellan is at Wilson, no official building for just these schools.

== Historical schools ==
- "First School" (College & N. Oneida, 1851–1855) Destroyed by fire and replaced by Hercules School.
  - Hercules School (south east cor Appleton and Fisk (Franklin St.), 1856–1896) Demolished and replaced by Lincoln School
  - Lincoln School (225 N. Oneida St.,1897–ca. 1938), sometimes referred to as "Second Ward – Lincoln School". Repurposed as Appleton City Hall in 1938. The Appleton Public Library now stands where this school did.
- First Ward School (?-1857) Fire in February 1857. New school completed in 1860 - ?
  - First Ward School (East side Meade bet Franklin and Eldorado, 1883–1961), renamed Edison Elementary School in 1932. Demolished in 1967, replaced on the same site by (modern day) Edison Elementary School.
- Second Ward School (1856 - ?) Building used as a high school during the winter 1859-1860.
  - Second Ward School (April 1883-?)
- Third Ward School (Lawrence and Elm, 1852-ca. 1868), Building purchased and moved and remodeled to serve as St. Joseph's first church and school.
  - Third Ward School (north east cor. 5th and Locust, ca.1868-?) became Third Ward High School/Free High School of Dist. No. 3 from 1891–1904. When high school students from this high school moved to Union High School.
  - Third Ward School (1884–ca. 1952), Later renamed Jefferson School. Demolished, and current Jefferson School built on the same site.
- Fourth Ward School (West side of Jackson bet Lincoln and Main, ca.1866-1879) Fire in September 1879 burned the school building to the ground. Rebuilt in ?
- Richmond School (1441 E John St., 1886–1952), named for the mayor of Appleton at the time, G. N. Richmond. Replaced at the same site by current Richmond Elementary School, opened 1953.
- Fifth Ward School (west side Locust betw Loraine and Elsie, 1876–1895), burned in October 1895. Replaced at the same site by Fifth Ward School.
  - Fifth Ward School (819 W. Elsie St., 1895–1967, 1969–1976), renamed Washington School in 1925. Still standing as Washington Plaza Apartments.
- Sixth Ward
  - Amicus School (east side of Appleton, bet Winnebago and Commercial,?-ca.1894 ) Replaced by the Columbian School. Dedicated in January 1894. At some point the name of the school changed to Columbus Elementary
- High School (Formally established in 1876 in 2 front rooms on the 2nd floor of the Hercules School.) First graduating class 1878.
  - Ryan High School (120 E. Harris St., 1881–January 26, 1904), completely destroyed by fire. Replaced on the same site by Union High School.
  - Union High School (1904–1938), moved its students to Appleton High School, then renamed to 'Carrie E. Morgan School, and used to house several schools, including a school for the deaf. Still used today as the Morgan Administration Building.
- Franklin School (218 E. Randall St., 1906–1952, 1953–1972). Renamed Jackson School in 1954 when it was forced to be re-opened by overcrowding (and because Franklin Elementary School had just been built to its north, completed in 1952). Demolished after its final closure in September 1977.

=== 1961-1962 Appleton School District merger ===
A 1959 Wisconsin state law required that all school districts have an attached high school in their district. In practice this meant that school districts without a high school either had to merge with districts that did, or build their own by a July 1962 deadline. Appleton School District ended up absorbing several schools and/or school districts to comply with the mandate.

In 1961 the Red Star School District was attached to the Appleton School District, after a vote to attach failed in 1959. At that time a new larger school was proposed by the school district, but building this never came to fruition, and the 1961 vote to attach succeeded.

- Red Star School (approx. 1915?–1965). A two room school, with one dedicated room for a kindergarten and the other a one-room schoolhouse format.

More schools were merged into the Appleton School District on April 25, 1962:

- Badger Elementary School (?–current)
- Elmdale School (approximate location 44.294019°N 88.353848°W, 1956–1962) A one room school north of Appleton, closed immediately after attachment to the Appleton School District. Used as district office space until 1964.
- Speel School (approximate location 44.253447°N 88.344014°W, 1928–1962) One room school closed immediately after attachment to the Appleton School District.
- Triangle School (approximate location 44.273465°N 88.470124°W, 1930–1962) One room school closed immediately after attachment to the Appleton School district, with pupils sent to Twin Willows or Badger.
- Twin Willows School (3335 N. Lynndale Dr., 1931–1988). Closed when Houdini Elementary School was opened.
- Woodlawn School (4300 N. Richmond St., 1927–1977).

=== Historical Select Schools ===
- Miss H A Carroll School (Washington and Union 1859-?) Started as the First Ward did not have a school house after the fire.
- Mary Pratt (December 1870-?)
- M Burroughs (Edgarton House, 1870-?) Summer School
- Brooks High School (Presbyterian Hall, 1853-?)
