= Gary Arndt =

American blogger and photographer

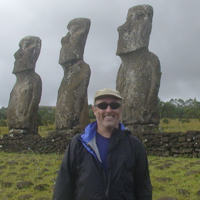
- Gary Arndt on Easter Island, 2007
- Born: 1969 (age 56–57); Appleton, Wisconsin, U.S.
- Education: Macalester College
- Occupations: Travel Blogger, Photographer, Speaker, Podcaster
- Website: https://everything-everywhere.com/everything-everywhere-daily-podcast/

Gary Arndt (born 1969) is an American blogger and photographer. He is the author of the travel blog Everything Everywhere and a former Minneapolis entrepreneur.

== Early life ==
Arndt was born in Appleton, Wisconsin. He attended Macalester College in the early 1990s, where he was a competitive debater, making it to the late rounds of the Cross Examination Debate Association National Tournament in 1990 and 1991.

== Business ownership ==
Arndt was a business owner in Minneapolis, Minnesota before he became a writer. He owned the web design firm, Creative Internet Solutions, which he sold in 1999 to Control Data Corporation. There, he developed the idea to open a video-game-playing facility while watching his employees play computer games after work. He owned the videogame salon The Stomping Grounds, with a location in Minneapolis and a second location that opened in 2002. The salon, one of the original PC-gaming rooms in the United States, was founded from the profits Arndt received from a gaming news website he bought in the late 1990s called Stomped.com. The business received about $1 million in revenue during its first year.

== Travelling career ==
In March 2007, Arndt sold his house in Eden Prairie, Minnesota in order to travel the world. The initial plan was to travel for about a year and a half, however, Arndt decided to continue his travels indefinitely. Since 2007, he has traveled to about 140 countries and all seven continents. Arndt does not maintain a personal residence, living only in temporary locations.

He chronicles his journey on his travel blog, Everything Everywhere, which has approximately 100,000 readers monthly. The blog includes both comments on the places he has traveled and photography. He also co-hosts the podcast This Week in Travel and has contributed articles and photography to websites including The Atlantic and HuffPost, and The Four Hour Work Week.

== Podcast ==
Since July 2020, Arndt has produced and hosted the Everything Everywhere Daily podcast, which, by 2025, had been downloaded over 14 million times.

== Recognition ==
Arndt has won awards from the Society of American Travel Writers and other organizations. In 2010, he was one of 25 selections for Time magazine's best blog list.
