= Gymnasium Theodorianum =

Coordinates: 51.7163°N 8.7546°E

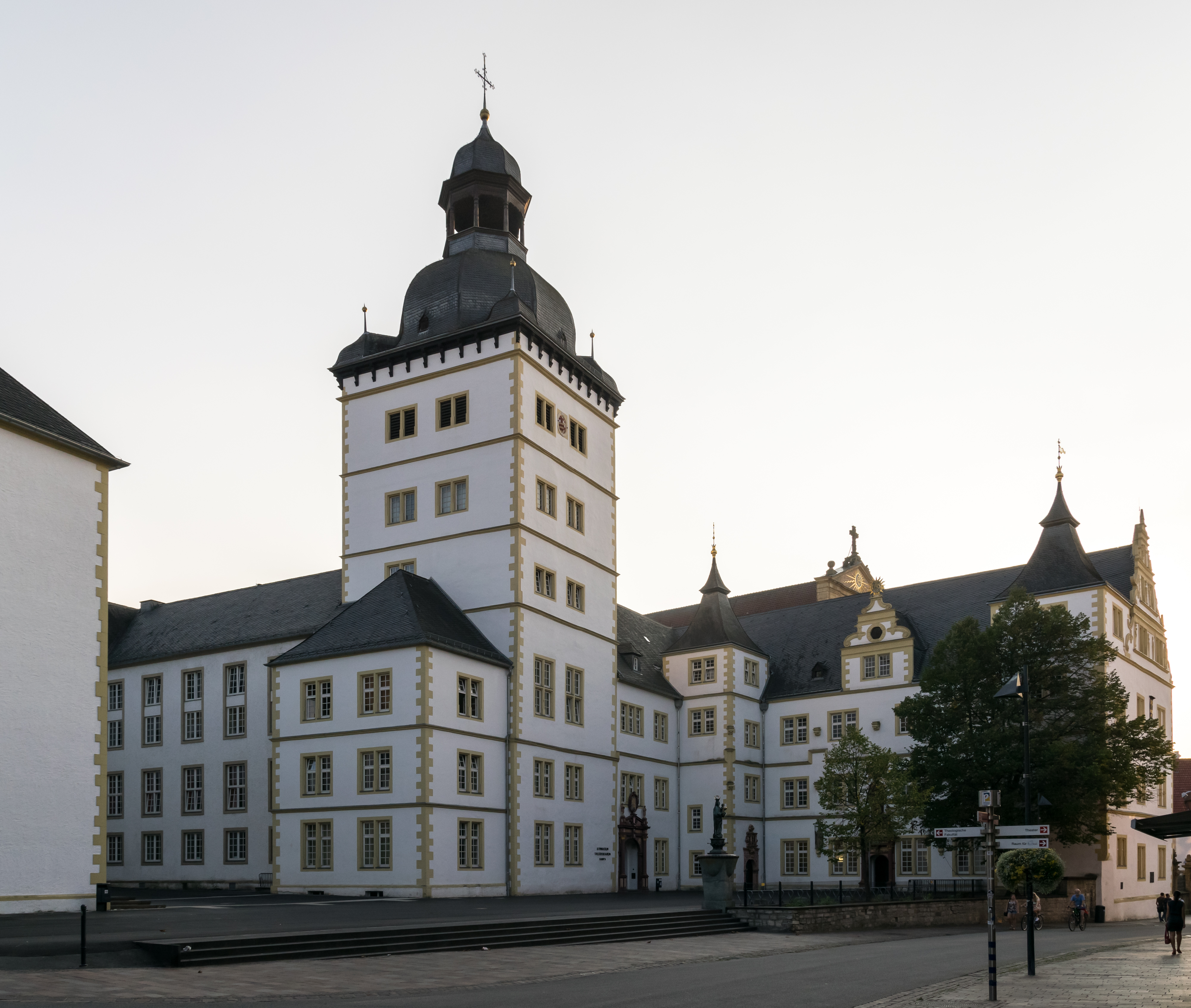

Location
- Kamp 4 Paderborn, North Rhine Westphalia, 33098; Germany

Information
- Type: Gymnasium
- Established: 799 (current building: 1612)
- Founder: Not documented, likely Charlemagne
- Headmaster: Nicole Michaelis
- Staff: 70
- Gender: Mixed (since 1971)
- Age: 10 to 18
- Enrolment: 723
- Website: https://www.theodorianum.de/

The Gymnasium Theodorianum is a grammar school situated in the historic centre of Paderborn, Germany. Succeeding in the tradition of the cathedral school founded in 799, it is among the ten oldest schools in the world. It continues in the ideals of Renaissance humanism, with Latin taught as the primary foreign language and Ancient Greek offered as an additional subject. The school has produced several leading German political, scientific, religious and military figures. It is known locally simply as the “Theo”.

== History ==
=== Medieval Cathedral School ===
The exact founding year cannot be established definitively. It is however directly linked to the construction of the Paderborn Cathedral in 777, along with a monastery in 780. On the occasion of Pope Leo III’s visit to Paderborn in 799, Charlemagne made a donation to the monastery, which likely included the cathedral school. This date is therefore widely considered the original founding date. The location of the school changed a number of times over subsequent years, within the immediate vicinity of the cathedral. Altmann, Bishop of Passau (1015-1091) is the first documented headmaster of the school. Further early headmasters included Reinher of Paderborn (1140-1190), who found a better method for calculating the Easter date, and crusader Cardinal Thomas Olivier (1170-1227).

=== Gymnasium Salentinianum and Growth under the Prince-Bishops ===
Following a period of decline during the 14th century, in competition with the appearance of universities, the school experienced a renewal under the rule of Bishop Salentin of Isenburg and headmaster Hermann von Kerssenbroch in the 1500s. The influence of renaissance humanism from this period is still a distinctive presence in the school ethos and curriculum. The school became Lutheran soon thereafter, like most of the citizenry of Paderborn, until the efforts of the Jesuits gradually led to a return of the school to Catholicism, marking the beginning of the Counter Reformation in the region. Under the Prince-bishop of Paderborn, Theodor von Fürstenberg, the forceful submission of Lutheranism in Paderborn was complete by 1604.

During this time the school also gradually moved to its current location, away from the immediate vicinity of the cathedral, with the current school buildings completed in 1612 and the church completed in 1692. The church, with a significant baroque altar, is used for school services to this day. The name Theodorianum also stems from this time.

Following the devastation of the Thirty Years War the school and wider region experienced a period of baroque bloom, at times numbered among the largest schools in Westphalia with up to 1000 pupils. A notable alumnus from this time is the important baroque architect and general Johann Conrad Schlaun, responsible for such buildings as Schloss Münster and the Erbdrostenhof.

=== New Humanism under Prussian Rule ===
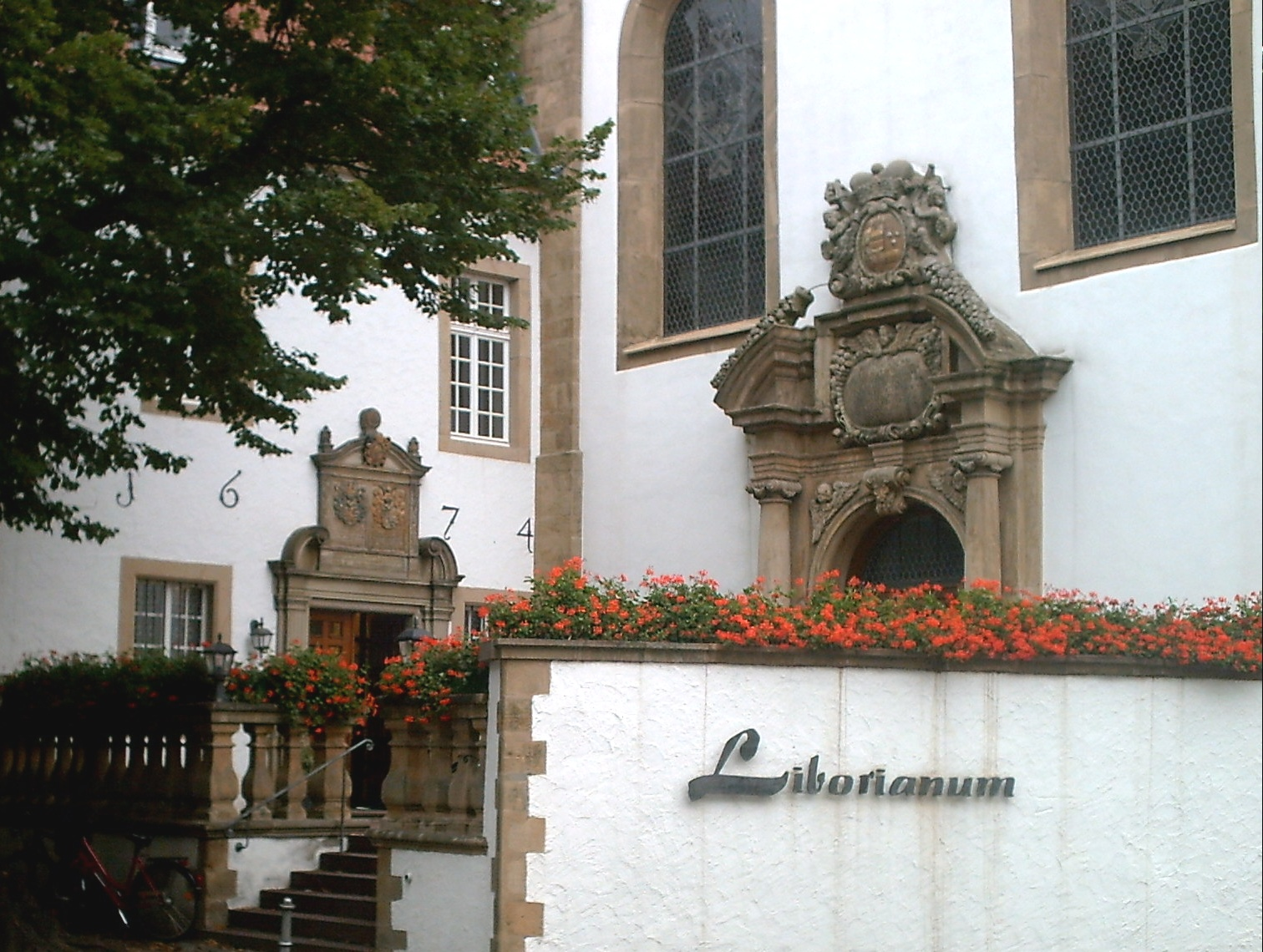
Liborianum

The annexation of the region by Prussia in 1802 resulted in the development of the school along the lines of German new humanism. Protestant and Jewish pupils were now admitted and the curriculum modernised according to the Humboldtian model of higher education under Friedrich Kohlrausch. In 1874 the school was officially secularised, ending its overt association with the Catholic Church, with its last clerical headmaster leaving in 1884. A rapid growth in student numbers at this time necessitated the expansion of the school buildings, completed in 1893.

From 1847 to 1979 a minor seminary was established by the Archdiocese in the nearby Liborianum for boys considering the priesthood. The majority of their education was provided by the Theodorianum.

Notable pupils from this period were the German Chancellor Wilhelm Cuno, the “father of modern analysis” Karl Weierstrass, the anatomist Heinrich Wilhelm Waldeyer, the composer Engelbert Humperdinck, and the resistance fighter Paul Lejeune-Jung.

== The school today ==
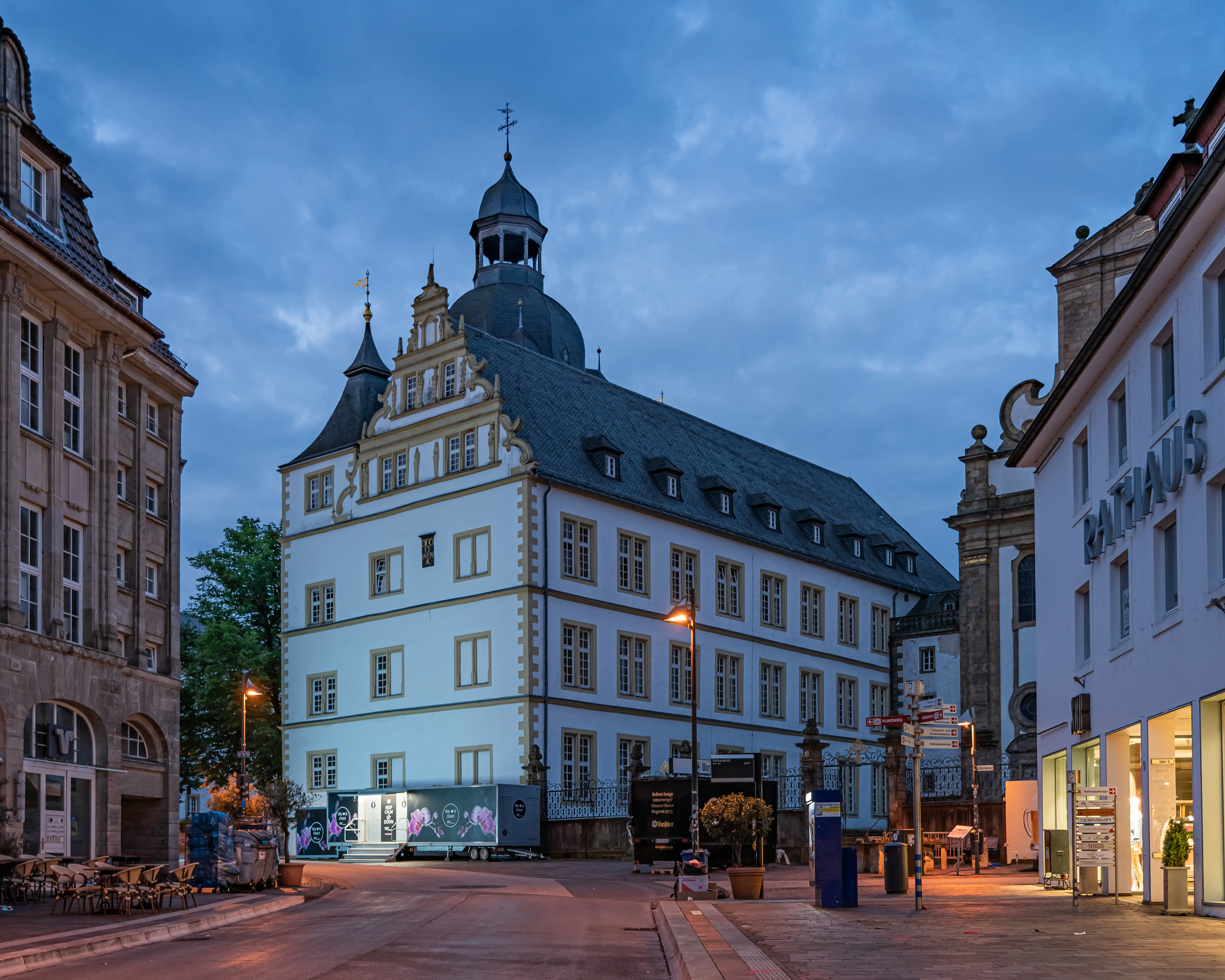
School within the historic town center

Between January and March 1945 the school was severely damaged by bombing, including the complete destruction of its library of 14,000 books. Reconstruction of the school was largely completed by 1954, with the main spire finished in 1975 and the church's baroque altar in 2004. From 1971 the school began to accept girls, though a boys’ class remained into the 1990s.

From 2013 to 2014 the school worked in partnership with the Mildenhall College Academy, Suffolk to create a monument commemorating the Christmas Truce. The monument is thought to be the first of its kind in Europe. It is located in the Peace Village of Mesen, Belgium.

=== Languages ===
Latin remains compulsory in Years 5-10 (approximately ages 10–16), being optional thereafter. English is also compulsory as a foreign language, though secondary to Latin. In Year 8 (age 14), either French or Ancient Greek are chosen as additional languages. From Year 10 (age 16), Spanish is also optionally available.

== Notable alumni ==
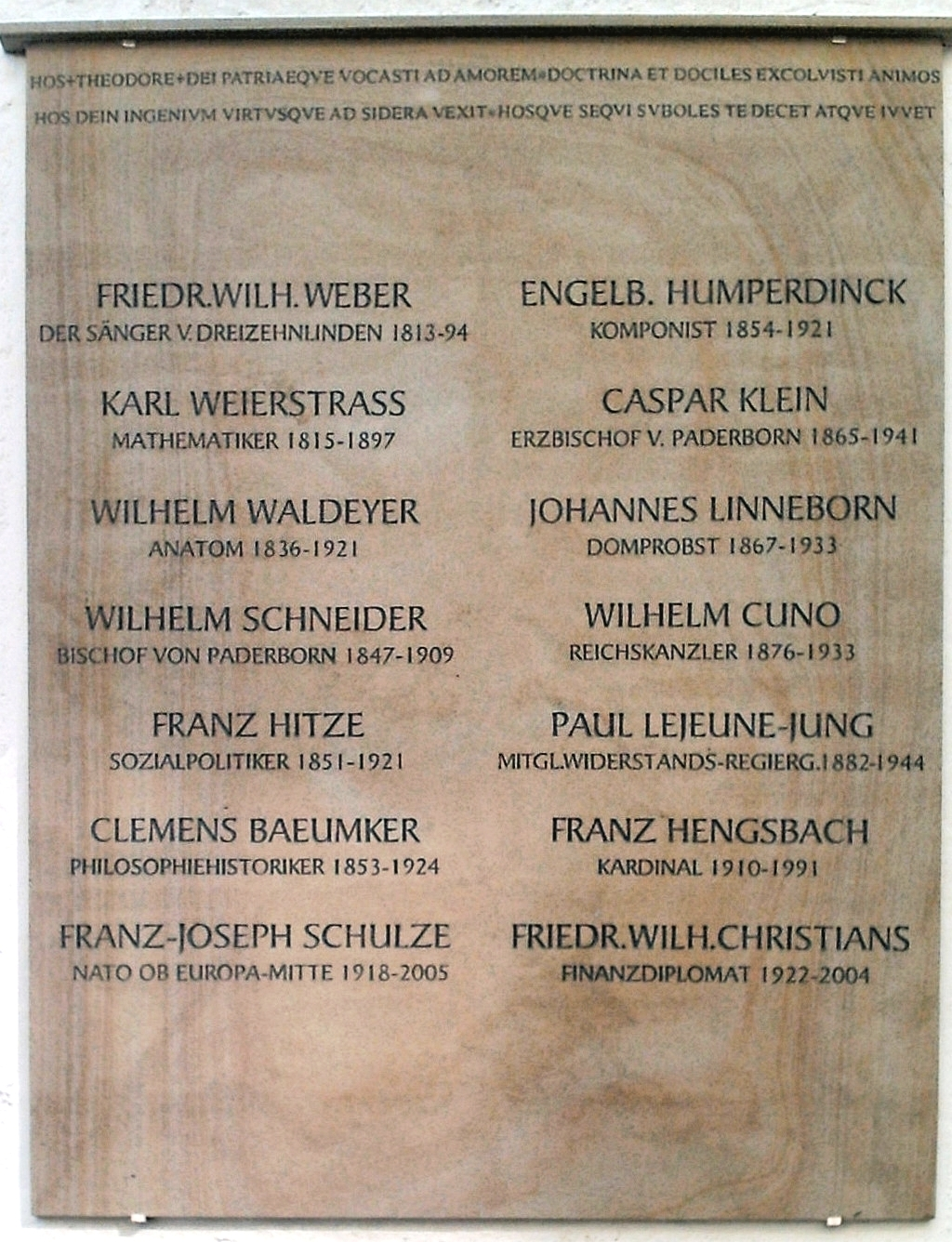

- Altmann von Passau († 1105), Bishop of Passau
- Saint Vicelinus (1090–1154), Bishop of Oldenburg in Holstein
- Athanasius Kircher (1602-1680), Jesuit polymath, "Master of a Hundred Arts"
- Vitus Georg Tönnemann (1659-1740), confessor to Emperor Charles VI
- Johann Conrad Schlaun (1695–1773), Baroque architect and soldier
- Karl Becker (philologist) (1775–1849), physician, educationalist, and philologist
- Friedrich Wilhelm Weber (1813–1894), poet and member of Prussian Assembly
- Karl Weierstrass (1815–1897), Mathematician, “father of modern analysis”
- Wilhelm Wilmers (1817–1899), Jesuit
- Franz von Löher (1818–1892), historian, jurist, and activist in the German revolutions of 1848–1849
- August Potthast (1824–1898), historian and librarian of the Reichstag
- Bonaventure Lüthen (1846-1911), priest and founding member of the Society of the Divine Savior
- Heinrich Wilhelm Waldeyer (1836–1921), anatomist, known for summarizing neuron theory and for naming the chromosome
- Clemens Bäumker (1853–1924), historian of philosophy
- Engelbert Humperdinck (1854–1921), composer, best known for the opera Hansel and Gretel
- Caspar Klein (1865–1941), Archbishop of Paderborn and opponent of Nazism
- Wilhelm Cuno (1876–1933), Chancellor of Germany
- Paul Lejeune-Jung (1882–1944), member of the Reichstag, and resistance fighter against Adolf Hitler's Third Reich
- Hugo Aufderbeck (1909-1981), theologian, Bishop and Apostolic Administrator in Erfurt-Meiningen.
- Franz Hengsbach (1910–1991), Cardinal of the Roman Catholic Church and Bishop of Essen
- Franz-Joseph Schulze (1918–2005), General, NATO Commander in Chief, Allied Forces Central Europe (CINCENT). Recipient of the Knight's Cross of the Iron Cross during World War II
- Friedrich Wilhelm Christians (1922–2004), chairman of the supervisory board of Deutsche Bank and president of the Association of German Banks
- Werner Franke (1940–2022), molecular biologist
- Elmar Brok (* 1946), Member of the European Parliament (MEP) from 1980 until 2019, best known for his role as chairman of the European Parliament Committee on Foreign Affairs
- Franz-Josef Bode (* 1951), Bishop of Osnabrück, Deputy Chairman of the German Bishops' Conference
- Gerhard Jorch (* 1951), pediatrician
- Burkhard Blienert (* 1966), Commissioner on Narcotic Drugs at the Federal Ministry of Health; former Member of the Bundestag
- Claudia Buch (* 1966), economist, Chair of the European Central Bank Supervisory Board
- Bernd Hüttemann (* 1970), Vice President of the European Movement International

== Literature ==
- Conrad Bade: Das Theodorianische Gymnasium von 1609–1773 und die spätern Verhältnisse desselben bis zu seiner Reorganisation durch die Preußische Regierung 1819. In: Zeitschrift für vaterländische Geschichte und Altertumskunde, Vol 10 (1847), p. 60–114 (Google Books, Sonderdruck: ULB Münster)
- Festschrift zur Feier des dreihundertjährigen Jubiläums des königlichen Gymnasiums Theodorianum in Paderborn 1912. Verlag: Junfermannsche Buchdruckerei.
- Das Paderborner Gymnasium Theodorianum und seine Baugeschichte; Segin, Leppelmann, Mensing, 1954.
- Festschrift des Gymnasiums Theodorianum in Paderborn zur 350. Wiederkehr der Grundsteinlegung des Schulgebäudes 1962. Eds.: F.-J. Weber, F. Ostermann, E. Nitsche. Verlag: Westfalen Druckerei GmbH.
- Von der Domschule zum Theodorianum Paderborn, Klemens Honselmann, Verein für Altertumskunde Westfalens Abteilung Paderborn, Band 3, Bonifacius Druckerei Paderborn, 1962.
- Fachschaft Geschichte des Gymnasium Theodorianum in Paderborn, ed. (1987), Gymnasium Theodorianum Paderborn 799-1612-1987: 375 Jahre Schulgebäude am Kamp (in German), Paderborn: Eigenverlag
- Butterwegge, Hubert: Viri illustres aus Paderborn: eine Tafel als Visitenkarte des altehrwürdigen Gymnasium Theodorianum. In: Jahrbuch Westfalen 48.1994 (1993) S. 35–38: Ill.

== See also ==
- List of Jesuit educational institutions
