= Bonaventure Lüthen =

Servant of God Bonaventure Lüthen, S.D.S.
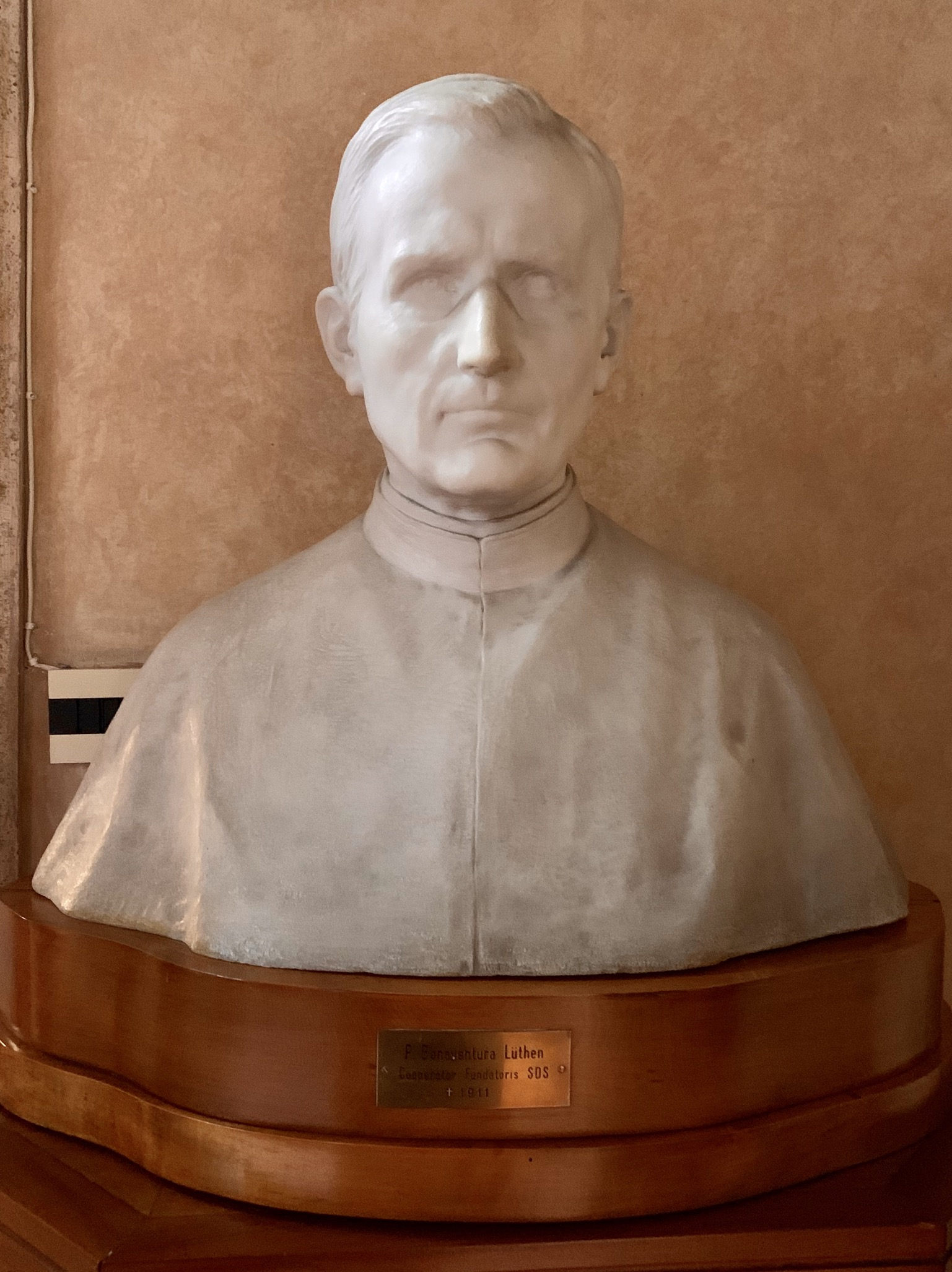
- A bust of Father Bonaventure Lüthen in the motherhouse of the Society of the Divine Savior, Rome

Priest and religious venerated in Catholic Church (Society of the Divine Savior)
- Born: May 5, 1846; Paderborn, Germany
- Died: December 10, 1911 (aged 65); Rome, Italy
- Major shrine: Salvatorian Motherhouse, Rome, Italy

Bonaventure Lüthen, S.D.S. (5 May 1846 - 10 December 1911), was a founding member of the Society of the Divine Savior, commonly called the Salvatorians, and a close collaborator of Venerable Francis Mary of the Cross Jordan. The cause for his beatification was introduced in 1943.

== Life ==
=== Early life and ministry ===
Bernard Lüthen was born in Paderborn, Germany, to Henry and Theresia Luthen. As a young man, Bernard decided to follow his older brother, Karl, into the local diocesan seminary. After completing secondary studies in a local, Jesuit-run school, he entered the archdiocesan seminary in Paderborn. He was ordained a priest on 15 May 1872, in the Paderborn Cathedral.

Because of chronic ill health and the limitations placed on the Catholic Church by the Kulturkampf, a parish assignment was not possible. Father Bernard was assigned to serve as the private chaplain to the family of Baron von Brenken of Wewer. He dutifully served the family and household staff, gradually extending his pastoral care to include Christian mothers, for whom he created a magazine entitled Monica.

In 1877, he traveled to Donauwörth in Bavaria to begin work with Ludwig Auer, a lay Catholic who ran an institute and publishing house known as the Cassianeum. Here, Father Bernard worked as editor of a publication for priests called the Ambrosius. He believed that the disintegration caused by the Kulturkampf could be undone by quality Catholic publications and by forming holy priests. To help achieve this goal, he encouraged the readers of Ambrosius to practice the traditional devotions of Eucharistic adoration, meditation, and penance. He imagined a renewed priesthood, based on a more fraternal way of life, that would help restore what had been lost in the life of the church.

=== The Salvatorians ===
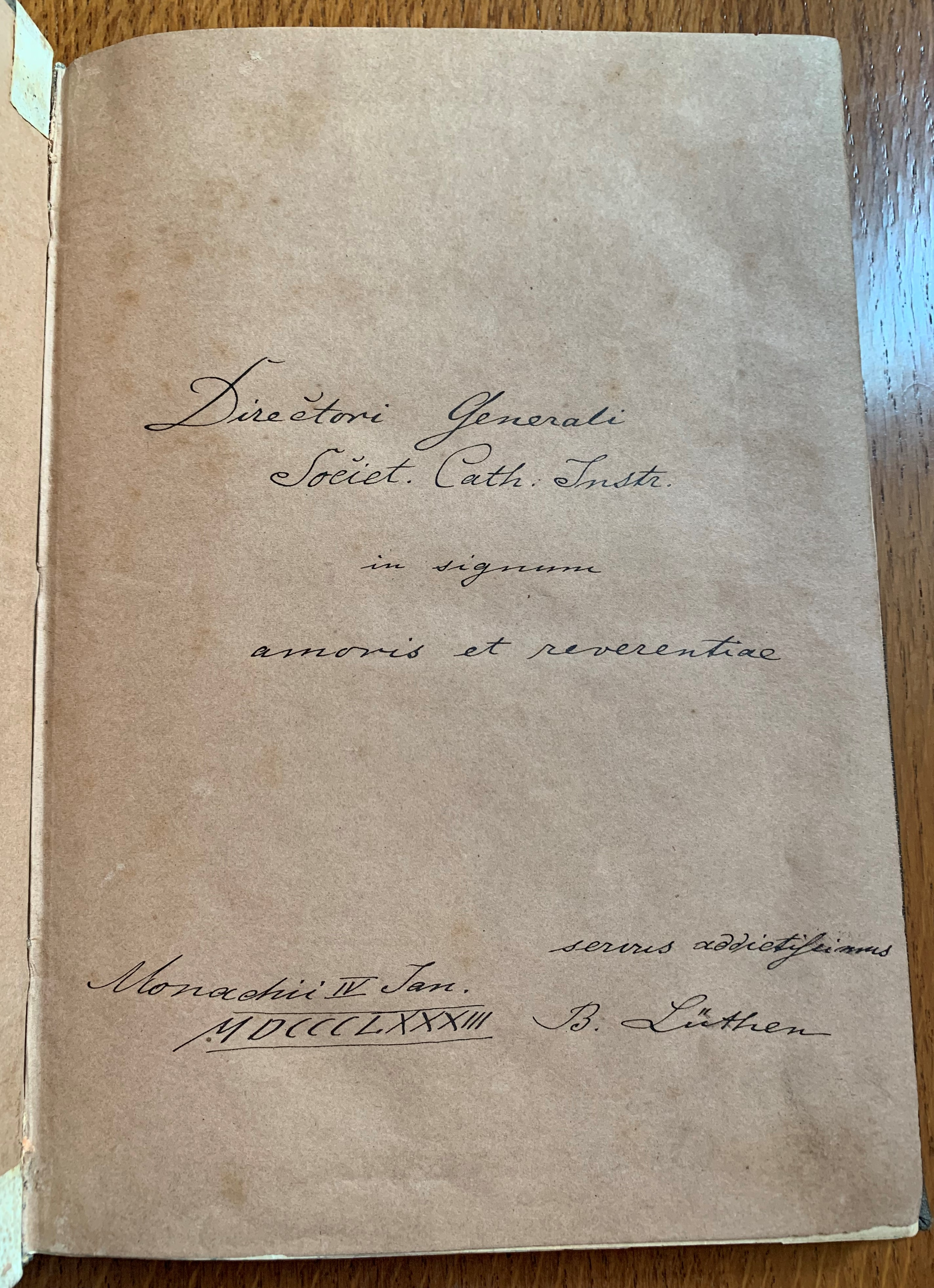
An inscription written by Father Lüthen in a bound edition of Der Missionär (1883)

In 1881, Father Bernard met Father John Baptist Jordan, a priest who dreamed of establishing a new movement of priests, professed religious, and lay men and women of different parts of society who could "give Christ back to the people." Although he did not initially feel drawn to Jordan's movement, he came to see that his vocation was to become part of what would become the Apostolic Teaching Society and, later, the Society of the Divine Savior. A few months after meeting Father Jordan, Father Bernard prepared the first edition of Der Missionär, a magazine for priests and lay Catholics.

On December 8 of that year, Father Jordan, along with Father Bernard and another priest, Father von Leonhardi, professed private vows as the first members of Father Jordan's Apostolic Teaching Society in the chapel of Saint Bridget of Sweden (the monastery in Rome's Piazza Farnese where Father Jordan was renting rooms). This new society did not have the formal character of a religious congregation and Father Bernard returned to his work in Germany.

In 1882, the Baroness Maria Therese von Wüllenweber (now known as Blessed Mary of the Apostles) expressed her desire to join in the work of Father Jordan and his Apostolic Teaching Society. Father Bernard, who was largely responsible for handling Father Jordan's correspondence, helped Wüllenweber fulfill her desire, which eventually led to formation of the Sisters of the Divine Savior.

The following year, following the directives of the Holy See, Father Jordan professed public vows, which transformed his society into a religious congregation. At this time, he began to wear the religious habit and took the religious name "Francis Mary of the Cross." Ten days later, Father Bernard received the religious habit and was given the name "Bonaventure."

In 1894, as part of Father Jordan's efforts to receive papal approbation for his society, the community of priests and brothers received a new name: The Society of the Divine Savior (or "The Salvatorians"); the sisters would be known as the "Sisters of the Divine Savior". The Salvatorians soon established foundations in a number of countries and Father Bonaventure became a support for Father Jordan and Mother Mary of the Apostles. Father Bonaventure served as novice master and director of students for the Society, helping make Father Jordan's vision for the Salvatorians a reality and leaving his own indelible mark on the first generation of priests and brothers.

=== Later life and death ===
After several years of serving as Father Jordan's secretary and mouthpiece, Father Bonaventure was replaced as the "vicar" of the Salvatorian Fathers and Brothers. He remained personal advisor and counselor to Father Jordan for the remainder of his life.

In the final years of Father Bonaventure's life, as he suffered from declining health, common prayer and celebrating Mass became more and more difficult for him. He died on 10 December 1911, after spending time with the community in recreation. Father Bonaventure's passing prompted Father Jordan to repeat the words of Job: "The Lord has given. The Lord has taken away. Blessed be the name of the Lord."

Father Bonaventure Lüthen was buried in the Salvatorians' plot in Rome's Campo Verano.

== See also ==
- Catholic Church in Germany
- Catholic religious order
