= Angel of Rome =

Angel of Rome may refer to:

- Samael, guardian angel of the city of Rome
- Alessandro Moreschi, Italian castrato singer
- Pankratius Pfeiffer, Catholic priest and rescuer of Jews during the Nazi occupation of Rome
- The Angel of Rome, 1992 BBC radio play based on Moreschi's life
- The Angel of Rome: And Other Stories, 2021 short story collection by Jess Walter
