= Sisters of the Sorrowful Mother =

Roman Catholic female congregation from Italy

The Sisters of the Sorrowful Mother are a Catholic congregation of Franciscan religious sisters founded in Rome, Italy, in 1883, who serve worldwide, particularly in the field of healthcare.

== Foundations ==
The congregation was founded at the initiative of Father Francis Mary of the Cross Jordan, founder of what was to become the Society of the Divine Savior, commonly known as the Salvatorians, as the female branch of the society. Jordan invited a young woman, Amalia Streitel (1844-1911), who had already been a sister of a Franciscan congregation, to move to Rome to lead this effort. She left Germany for Italy, where she made her vows, received the religious habit of the new congregation and the religious name Maria Franziska of the Cross on 16 February 1883. She arrived to find that the housing Jordan had procured for her was an apartment lacking furniture and cooking utensils. As she was joined by other women, the sisters took in orphans of the city, caring for them in their own rooms.

Differences in vision arose between the two and in 1885, the sisters separated from the Salvatorians. The 36 women who formed the community then went under the authority of the Diocese of Rome and were given the name by which they are now known. The congregation took the Rule of the Third Order Regular of St. Francis at that time, combining a life of service with that of contemplation. To support themselves, the sisters provided home nursing care and worked in the sacristy of the Church of Santa Maria della Pietà in Camposanto dei Teutonici, the German national church of Rome.

In 1890 Streitel arrived in the United States at the request of Bishop of Wichita, John Joseph Hennessy, that the congregation take over St. Francis hospital which was faltering. From there they expanded to Wisconsin, where they founded Mercy Medical Center (Oshkosh, Wisconsin), and many other Hospitals in the US and Caribbean. A health resort was later opened in Denville, New Jersey, and a mission was opened in Oklahoma.

Final approval of the congregation was received on 6 March 1911 by Pope Pius X, the same day that Streitel died in Castel Sant'Elia, Italy.

== Current status ==
At present the sisters of the Sorrowful Mother serve in Italy, Austria, Brazil, the Dominican Republic, Germany, the United States, Grenada, St. Lucia, Tanzania and Trinidad and Tobago. The Generalate is in Rome. The motherhouse of the Saint Clare of Assisi provicialate is in Oshkosh, Wisconsin.
