= Madeleine Sophie Barat =

French Roman Catholic saint

Saint Madeleine Sophie Barat RSCJ
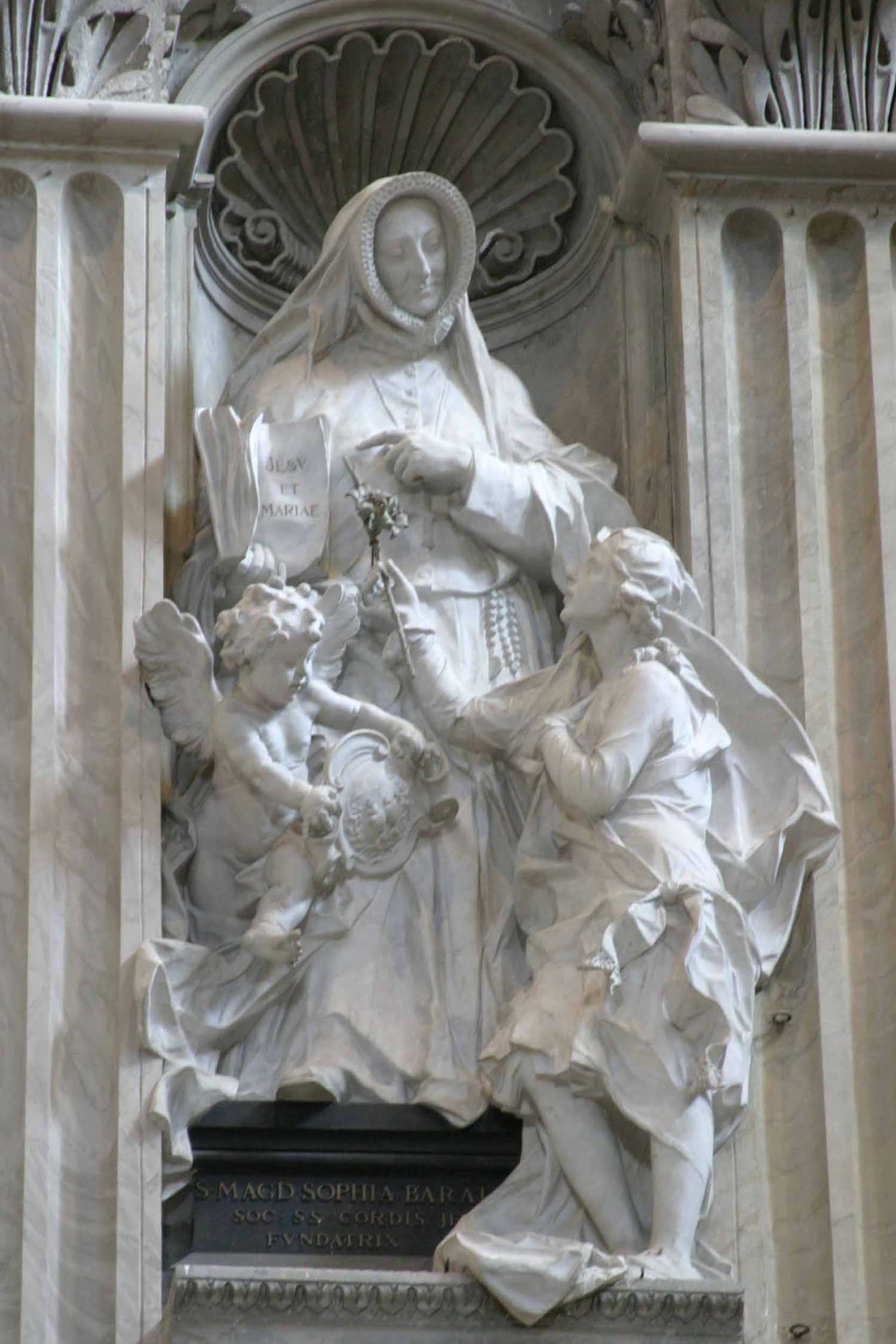
- Statue of St. Sophie Barat in St. Peter's Basilica

Virgin
- Born: 12 December 1779; Joigny, Champagne, Kingdom of France
- Died: 25 May 1865 (aged 85); Paris, France
- Venerated in: Catholic Church
- Beatified: 24 May 1908, Saint Peter's Basilica by Pope Pius X
- Canonized: 24 May 1925, Saint Peter's Basilica by Pope Pius XI
- Major shrine: St Francis Xavier Church, Paris, France
- Feast: 25 May

Madeleine Sophie Barat, RSCJ, (12 December 1779 – 25 May 1865), was a French religious sister who founded the Society of the Sacred Heart, a worldwide religious institute of educators. Pope Pius XI canonised her in 1925.

== Early life and family ==
Barat was born on the night of 12 December 1779, in Joigny, France, next door to a house fire at a neighbour’s home. The stress and the terror of the fire caused Sophie's mother, Madeleine Fouffé Barat (1740–1822), then pregnant with her third child, to go into labour. Born two months premature, Madeleine Sophie was considered so fragile that she was baptised early the next morning in Sainy Thibault Church, just a few yards from the Barat family home. Although her parents had arranged godparents in advance, there was no time to call them to the church and so at five o'clock on the morning of 13 December 1779, Louise-Sophie Cédor, a local woman on her way to early Mass, and Sophie's older brother, Louis, stood in as her godparents.

Barat was born into a financially-comfortable family whose ancestors had lived in Joigny for generations and were proud of their roots in the region. Her father, Jacques Barat (1742–1809), was a cooper and vine-grower. Both professions were respected trades, with centuries of French culture behind them. The Barats were Jansenist Catholics, which is said to have shaped Sophie's spirituality profoundly. She was always willing to help people in need and to pray for others.

== Education ==
Barat's older brother Louis was a serious boy and a brilliant student. Their parents encouraged his interest in studies and employed a tutor for him at home. Shortly after entering the Collège Saint-Jacques in Joigny at the age of nine, Louis decided to become a Catholic priest. In 1784, at the age of 16, Louis left Joigny to begin his studies for the priesthood at the seminary at Sens. Louis was ordained a deacon, but because he was too young to be ordained, he was obliged to return home until he was 21. Louis became a teacher of mathematics at his old school and decided to take on Sophie's education. He taught her Latin, Greek, history, natural science, Spanish, and Italian providing Sophie with an education that was rarely available to young women and girls at the time.

== French Revolution ==
In 1789, Louis Barat became involved in the debate surrounding the pending Civil Constitution of the Clergy, which required all priests to swear allegiance to the new revolutionary state. Louis took the oath of loyalty in January 1791, but on learning that the pope had condemned the Constitution, he renounced his oath in May 1792. That renunciation had immediate consequences. Louis first tried to hide in his family's attic but soon fled to Paris, for the danger had become too great both for himself and his family. In Paris, he was arrested in May 1793, imprisoned there for two years and escaped the guillotine only through the brave intervention of a friend.

After her brother was released in 1795, he briefly returned home to Joigny. Louis then went back to Paris to seek ordination and exercise his ministry in secret. He brought sixteen-year-old Sophie with him to further her education. After arriving in Paris, Sophie and Louis lived in a safe house belonging to one Madame Duval. Sophie worked as a seamstress and became an excellent embroidress. Louis continued to say Mass and teach Sophie the Fathers of the Church, mathematics, Latin, and the Scriptures. While living in Paris, at about the age of 18, Sophie decided to become a Carmelite nun. That would be impossible, however, for the Carmelites had, along with many other religious communities, been abolished in 1790. For five years, she lived in Paris a life of prayer and study and taught catechism in secret to the children of The Marais quarter. In 1800, Sophie briefly returned home to help her family with the vine harvest.

== Founding of Society of the Sacred Heart ==
When Barat returned to Paris, she was introduced to Joseph Varin. He wanted to found a religious order of women devoted to the Sacred Heart of Jesus and involved in the education of young women that would complement the work of the Fathers of the Faith. On 21 November 1800, at the age of 20, she abandoned her dream of becoming a Carmelite and, along with three other women living in the Paris safe-house, took her vows as one of the first members of this new religious congregation, marking the foundation of the Society of the Sacred Heart. However, because the French authorities had prohibited devotion to the Sacred Heart of Jesus, the society was initially known as Dames de la Foi ("Ladies of the Faith") or de l’Instruction chrétienne (" ...of Christian instruction").

The first school was opened in Amiens in northern France in September 1801 and Sophie traveled to the provincial city in order to teach. She made her vows, 7 June 1802. The new community and school grew quickly. A school giving classes to the poor of the town was opened. In December 1802, at the age of twenty-three, Sophie became Superior of the Society of the Sacred Heart.

== Expansion ==
In November 1804, Barat traveled to Sainte-Marie-d’en-Haut, near Grenoble, in southeastern France, to receive a community of Visitation nuns into the Society. Among them was Philippine Duchesne, who would later introduce the Society to America and was canonized in 1988. A second school was then established at Grenoble, followed by a third at Poitiers in western France. Varin envisioned an entire network of such schools and, after the first establishments in France, foundations were established in North America (1818), Italy (1828), Switzerland (1830), Belgium (1834), Algiers (1841), England (1842), Ireland (1842), Spain (1846), Holland (1848), Germany (1851), South America (1853), Austria (1853) and Poland (1857).

Sophie Barat is credited with the twofold gift of intuition in the choice of persons fitted for office and trust of those in responsible posts. New foundations were always entrusted to other hands.

In January 1806, Barat was elected Superior General of the Society of the Sacred Heart. In 1820, she called all of the superiors together in a council at Paris to establish a uniform course of studies for the quickly expanding network of Sacred Heart schools. The studies were to be serious, to cultivate the mind, and to create young women who would be devoted to the Sacred Heart of Jesus and perform good deeds in God's name. As foundations continued to multiply, Sophie saw the need for a greater degree of unity and sought the approval of the Vatican in Rome. By 1826, the Society of the Sacred Heart had received its decree of approbation from Rome.

In 1818 she founded Children of Mary of the Sacred Heart in Paris. She established another chapter of the same group in 1832 Lyons, with the alternate name "Congregation of the Children of Mary."

In 1840, Barat averted a potential schism between the Vatican and the Archbishop of Paris. All of her sisters pressured her to choose sides, Sophie refused to do so and was able to heal the breach. Over the course of her 65 years as the superior general, Sophie and her Society survived the regime of Napoleon, saw France undergo two more revolutions, and witnessed Italy's struggle to become a full-fledged nation.

The Sacred Heart schools quickly earned an excellent reputation. She dreamed of educating all children regardless of their parents' financial means. For almost every new school established, a corresponding “free” school was opened to provide the poorer children of the area with a high-quality education, which they would not otherwise have received.

== Death ==
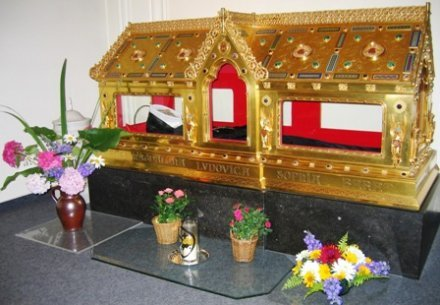

During her 65-year leadership, the Society of the Sacred Heart grew to include more than 3,500 members educating women in Europe, North Africa, North and South America. Barat died at the general motherhouse in Paris on Ascension Day, May 25, 1865. In 1879, she was declared venerable and was beatified on May 24, 1908. On May 24, 1925, she was canonized by Pope Pius XI.

Barat's mortal remains are located in an ornate reliquary in the Church of Saint-François-Xavier, Paris.

Barat was known to refuse to have her photograph or portrait taken, and it had been believed that no portrait of her existed from her lifetime, but there is photograph of her on her deathbed. In 1992, a portrait was discovered during a restoration at the convent of Sante Rufina e Seconda in Rome by the Sisters of the Immaculate Conception of Ivrea. It is believed to have been painted prior to her beatification and sent from Italy to the Mother House in Paris in 1879. It currently hangs in the General Archives of the Society of the Sacred Heart.

One of Barat's earliest biographers was Louis Baunard, who wrote Histoire de la vénérable Mère Madeleine-Sophie Barat, fondatrice de la Société du Sacré-Cœur de Jésus.

== Quotes ==
“We don’t live with angels; we have to put up with human nature and forgive it.”

“Before making any change take counsel ... Prudence and a wise slowness are necessary in the beginning.”

“More is gained by indulgence than by severity.”

"Be humble, be simple, bring joy to others."

"For the sake of one child, I would have founded the Society."

"Your example, even more than your words, will be an eloquent lesson to the world."

"Give only good example to the children; never correct them when out of humor or impatient. We must win them by an appeal to their piety and to their hearts. Soften your reprimands with kind words; encourage and reward them. That is, in short, our way of educating."

"Let us leave acts, not words. Nobody will have time to read us."

=== About her ===
“It was her way to think well of people until forced to do otherwise.”

“She loved people through their faults to the core of their best selves.”

== Legacy ==
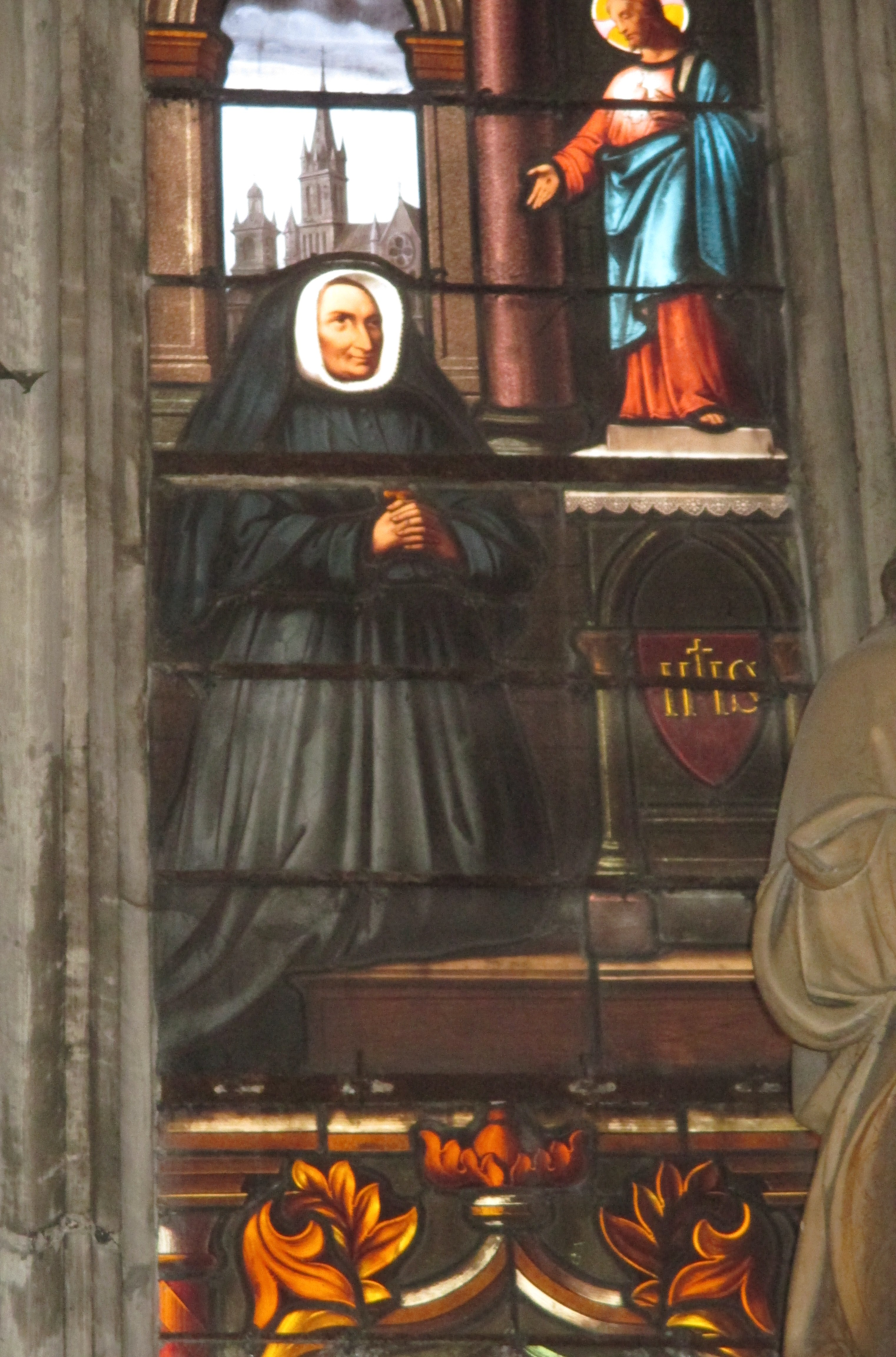
Stained glass window in Saint Thibault Church, in Joigny, where Barat was baptized in 1779.

A number of Barat's students founded their own religious congregations. Eugénie Smet, a pupil of Lille, founded the Society of the Helpers of the Holy Souls. Anne de Meeûs, a pupil in Paris, wrote the constitutions of her congregation of Religious of Perpetual Adoration at the little Château in Jette. Henriette d'Osseville, a pupil in Paris, founded the Sisters of Our Lady of Fidelity.

The legacy of Barat can be found in the more than 100 schools operated by her Society of the Sacred Heart, institutions known for the quality of the education made available to the young. She founded the Society of the Sacred Heart, which would focus on schools for the poor as well as boarding schools for young women of means. Today, co-educational Sacred Heart schools can be found as well as schools exclusively for boys.

The Sophie Barat School in Hamburg, Germany, an independent non-fee-paying co-educational grammar school, is run by the Society of the Sacred Heart.

Barat College, in Lake Forest, Illinois, the descendant of the Academy of the Sacred Heart, was founded on Wabash Avenue in 1858 and relocated to Lake Forest in 1904. It received its charter from the State of Illinois in 1918. Barat College merged with DePaul University in 2001 and was closed in 2005.

The Barat Education Foundation, an independent nonprofit organization, was established in 2000 prior to the sale of Barat College to DePaul University. At the time, the foundation was charged with the development and support of innovative educational programs and services that reflected the values and educational tradition of Barat College. When DePaul University closed Barat College in June 2005, the board of directors voted to perpetuate and build upon the Barat legacy of education, leadership and advocacy. Today, the Barat Education Foundation is committed to continuing and adapting the heritage and legacy of Barat College to the 21st-century world.

The "Saint Madeleine Sophie Barat Tribute and Memorial Scholarship" is available annually to two new or returning students attending Oak Hill School in St. Louis, Missouri. The scholarship is funded by tribute and memorial contributions, and the amount of assistance varies each year.

== In popular culture ==
Sophie the Giraffe, a French children's toy, is indirectly named after Madeleine Sophie Barat, because the first toy went into production on May 25, 1961, St. Sophie's day.
