= Regina Coeli (prison) =

Prison in Rome, Italy

Coordinates: 41°53′43″N 12°27′52″E

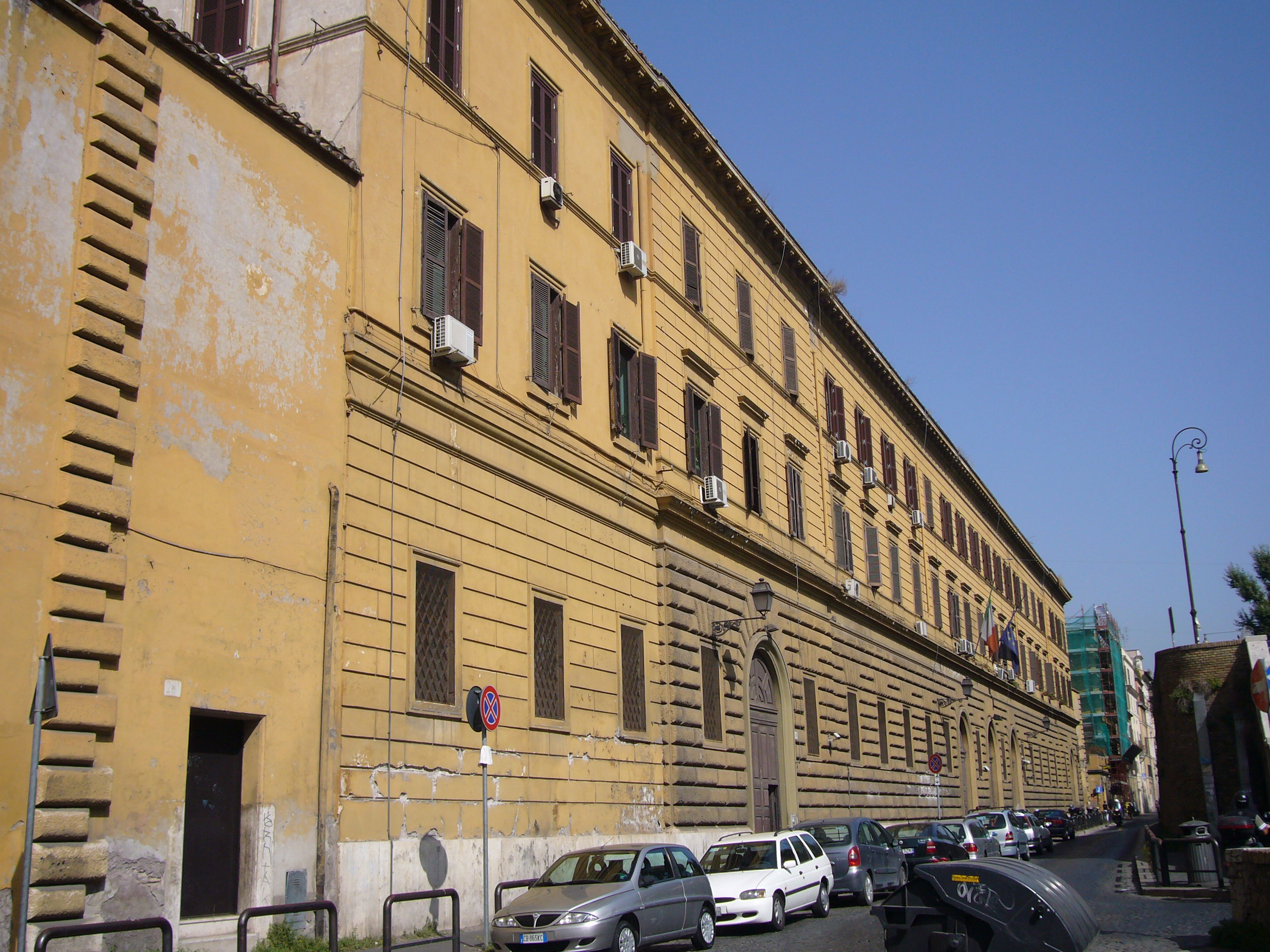
Lungara street façade of the Regina Coeli prison

Regina Coeli (Latin for 'Queen of Heaven'; Italian: Carcere di Regina Coeli [ˈkartʃere di reˈdʒiːna ˈtʃɛːli]) is a prison in the city of Rome. It was formerly a Catholic convent and became a prison in 1881.

== History ==
The prison was originally a Catholic convent (hence the name), built in 1654 in the rione of Trastevere. The construction was started by Pope Urban VIII in 1642, but his death stopped the works and the complex remained unfinished. Between 1810 and 1814 the former Catholic convent was confiscated by Napoleonic French forces, who suppressed all religious orders in territories under French control during the Napoleonic Wars. While the complex was returned to Carmelite nuns shortly afterwards, they abandoned the convent in 1873.

The newly established Kingdom of Italy confiscated the complex and decided to turn it into a prison in 1881. The refurbishing was carried out by Carlo Morgini and was completed only in 1900. A new complex housing a prison for women, dubbed "Le Mantellate" was erected nearby on a place also formerly occupied by a Catholic convent. Regina Coeli replaced the Carceri Nuove as Rome's primary jail.

While serving as a prison and jail, since 1902 the Regina Coeli also served as a police academy and one of the first schools in Italy to focus on forensics and criminal anthropology. During the times of Fascist Italy the prison served for detention of political prisoners. Erich Priebke took part in the Ardeatine Massacre of 24 March 1944. Many of the 335 victims were prisoners taken from Regina Coeli and from the Via Tasso prison. The killings were a reprisal for a partisan attack that killed 33 German soldiers the day before, and ten Italians were killed for each German.

Pankratius Pfeiffer, Superior General of the Salvatorians and "the Angel of Rome", is said to have visited the prisons of Regina Coeli and Via Tasso everyday during the Nazi occupation of Rome in 1943 and 1944, returning with a freed prisoner, since he acted as an intermediary between Pope Pius XII and the German authorities. In this capacity, he rescued hundreds of Jews and others in Rome from execution by the Nazis. He also persuaded the Nazis to spare several Italian cities from destruction during their retreat from Italy.

On December 26, 1958, Pope John XXIII visited the prison, washing the feet of several prisoners. This act was repeated by Pope Paul VI in 1964, Pope John Paul II in 2000, and Pope Francis in 2018.

In 1979, the prison was bombed by the Movimento Rivoluzionario Popolare, a neo-fascist organisation.

During the theft of the Santo Bambino of Aracoeli on 1 February 1994, inmates at the Regina Coeli prison wrote a petition to their anonymous "colleagues", asking for its return.

In modern times the prison complex can house up to 900 detainees.

== Notable prisoners ==
=== Pre-Fascist Italy ===
- Amerigo Dumini, American-born Italian fascist hitman who led the group responsible for the 1924 assassination of Unitary Socialist Party (PSU) leader Giacomo Matteotti, which led to the Aventine Secession (20th century). He was arrested on July 12, 1924, at the Roma Termini railway station, as he was preparing to leave for the north of Italy and was brought to the Regina Coeli prison. He was sentenced to a five-year prison sentence, of which he only served eleven months, benefiting from an amnesty ordered by Mussolini.

=== Under Fascist Italy and German occupation ===
- Massimo Mila, Italian musicologist, music critic, intellectual and anti-fascist. He was imprisoned for the first time in 1929 for anti-fascist activities. He joined the Turin group of "Justice and Freedom" (Giustizia e Libertà) and, on 15 May 1935, following a report by the writer Dino Segre (alias Pitigrilli) he was arrested for the second time together with Einaudi, Foa, Ginzburg, Antonicelli, Bobbio, Pavese, Carlo Levi and Luigi Salvatorelli. He was sentenced by the Tribunale Speciale to seven years imprisonment with inter alia Riccardo Bauer and Ernesto Rossi, which he spent in the prison of Regina Coeli in Rome. In a moment of despair he wrote a letter addressed to Mussolini: "Never again will I allow myself to do or express anything that can be, directly or indirectly, in any case hostile, or contrary to, or harmful to the Regime".
- Giovanni Baldelli, Italian anarchist theorist. He was arrested in March 1933 for anti-fascist activities and held at Regina Coeli, Rome until 11 December 1933. He was put at the disposal of the Special Tribunal and released after nine months for insufficient evidence. During this period of incarceration he was under the "Tribunale Speciale" for five months.
- Curzio Malaparte, Italian writer, filmmaker, war correspondent and diplomat. In the 1920s, Malaparte was one of the intellectuals who supported the rise of Italian fascism and Benito Mussolini. However, he was stripped of his National Fascist Party membership and sent to internal exile from 1933 to 1938 on the island of Lipari for his independent streak. He was freed on the personal intervention of Mussolini's son-in-law and heir apparent Galeazzo Ciano, but Mussolini's regime arrested Malaparte again in 1938, 1939, 1941, and 1943, imprisoning him in the Regina Coeli.
- Guido Gonella, Italian politician. On 3 September 1939, a few days after the beginning of World War II, Gonella was arrested by the fascists and brought to Regina Coeli, being freed only after the intervention of Pope Pius XII. Though he returned to L'Osservatore Romano, he was forbidden to teach in Universities.
- Luigi Ugolini, Italian writer. On 27 April 1940 Ugolini was arrested by the Fascist police for his essays against the regime, sentenced to 2 years. He wrote a book, "Regina coeli – dieci mesi di carcere fascista", in 1970 on his prison experience.
- Roberto Assagioli, Italian psychiatrist and pioneer in the fields of humanistic and transpersonal psychology. Founder of the psychological movement known as psychosynthesis. In 1940, Assagioli was arrested and imprisoned by Benito Mussolini's Fascist government, having been accused of "praying for peace and inviting others to join him along with other international crimes." He was placed in a solitary cell in Regina Coeli prison for 27 nights, until he was released and returned to his family.
- Antonio Gramsci, Italian Marxist philosopher, journalist, linguist, writer, and politician. On 9 November 1926, the Fascist government enacted a new wave of emergency laws, taking as a pretext an alleged attempt on Mussolini's life that had occurred several days earlier. The fascist police arrested Gramsci, despite his parliamentary immunity, and brought him to Regina Coeli. At his trial, Gramsci's prosecutor stated, "For twenty years we must stop this brain from functioning". He received an immediate sentence of five years in confinement on the island of Ustica and the following year he received a sentence of 20 years' imprisonment in Turi, near Bari. Gramsci died on 27 April 1937, at the age of 46.
- Cipriano Facchinetti, Italian politician, deputy, senator, minister, journalist, president of ANSA and president of Malpensa airport. In 1943, being in Marseille, he was arrested by the Germans and taken to Rome to the Regina Coeli prison, until July 25.
- Leone Ginzburg, Italian editor, writer, journalist and teacher, as well as an important anti-fascist political activist and a hero of the resistance movement. Imprisoned on 20 November 1943, taken to the German section of the prison and subjected to severe torture. Died at Regina Coeli on 5 February 1944 at 34 years age.
- Mario Pannunzio, Italian journalist and politician. During December 1943 Pannunzio was arrested by Nazis while he was in the newspaper's print works: he spent several months in Regina Coeli.
- Giuseppe Garibaldi II, Italian soldier, patriot and revolutionary, grandson of Giuseppe Garibaldi. Opposed Mussolini's Fascist Party, left for the United States, imprisoned in 1940 by German authorities when he returned to Italy. Retired to private life after the war.
- Petro Marko, Albanian writer. In 1940 after being repatriated from France to Albania he was arrested by the Italian army, imprisoned in Bari, then and sent along with 600 other prisoners to Ustica, an island of the Tyrrhenian Sea from 1941 to 1943, finishing with Regina Coeli prison near Rome in 1944.
- Giuseppe Saragat and Sandro Pertini, the fifth and seventh presidents of Italy respectively, unknown when they were imprisoned at Regina Coeli. Both freed in a raid by partisans led by Massimo Severo Giannini.
- Tigrino Sabatini, communist and a leader of the Italian Resistance. Arrested on 23 January 1944, Sabatini was imprisoned at the Via Tasso SS prison and subsequently Regina Coeli. Twice put on trial, he was sentenced to death on 14 April 1944 and executed on 3 May, less than five weeks before the Anglo-Americans liberated Rome.
- Piero Terracina, Italian Jewish manager, Holocaust survivor of the extermination camp at Auschwitz. After escaping the catch of October 16, 1943, which took place throughout Rome, he was arrested on April 7, 1944, in Rome, following a report from an informer, together with the whole family: the parents, his sister Anna, the brothers Cesare and Leo, uncle Amedeo, grandfather Leone David. All Italians, before being Jews, no one objected in 1944, in order not to fall victim to the fascist regime and suffer the same deportation to the extermination camps reserved for opponents and Jews. The whole Terracina family was detained for a few days in the Regina Coeli prison in Rome, and after a brief stay in the Fossoli camp, on 17 May 1944, was then sent to deportation to Auschwitz.
- Roberto Lucifero d'Aprigliano, lawyer and antifascist partisan during the war, politician and journalist post-war, briefly (and divisively) served as national secretary of the Italian Liberal Party in 1947/48. After the Badoglio Proclamation of 8 September 1943, Roberto Lucifero d'Aprigliano participated in the Roman resistance against the city's occupation by German forces, as a member of an underground monarchist group. In April 1944 he was captured by German Nazi paramilitaries and imprisoned in the Regina Coeli, from where he was released on 4 June 1944 as allied forces liberated Rome from the German occupation.
- Luigi Pintor (politician), Italian left-wing politician and journalist. On 14 May 1944, Pintor was arrested by the fascists, tortured and imprisoned at Regina Coeli, waiting for a death sentence; luckily, Pintor was freed one month later during the Liberation of Rome.

=== Post-WWII ===
- Guido Leto, Italian police official, head of the OVRA, the secret police of the Fascist regime, from 1938 to 1945. Imprisoned in Regina Coeli and subjected to an "epuration" commission, acquitted on 12 April 1946 by the Court of Appeal from the charges brought against him.
- Piero Piccioni, Italian film score composer and lawyer, son of Attilio Piccioni. Suspect in the case of Wilma Montesi, a Roman girl found dead on the beach of Torvaianica. Attilio was appointed Minister of Foreign Affairs in the brief first Fanfani government (January–February 1954), after which he was summoned again by President Einaudi to succeed Fanfani as Prime Minister. Piccioni, however, did not want to take on this responsibility due to his son's scandal. Because of this scandal, on 19 September Piccioni resigned as Minister of Foreign Affairs and from all his official offices. Two days later, his son Piero was arrested on charges of manslaughter and drug use and then imprisoned in the Regina Coeli prison. Piero obtained provisional freedom after three months in preventive detention and was finally cleared of all charges.
- Giorgio Pisanò, Italian journalist, essayist and neo-fascist politician. His protest against socialist leader Mancini culminated in being accused by Dino De Laurentiis for extortion in 1971 and his incarceration in Regina Coeli, where he spent 114 days before being acquitted of all charges by the Court of Rome on July 14 and released.
- Claudio Camaso, Italian actor, noted as much for his troubled, violent life and neo-fascist sympathies as for his performances. On 16 September 1977, while in police custody, Camaso committed suicide by hanging himself in his cell in Regina Coeli prison.
- Lillo Venezia, Italian journalist. Lillo Venezia was the second Italian journalist to be imprisoned after World War II (a few days in Regina Coeli) after Giovannino Guareschi, following a complaint for insulting religion and a foreign head of state (the Pope). Some copies of the newspaper were burned in the square by the parish priest of Spilimbergo, who judged it "worthy of falling in the magma of our Italic volcanoes, a congenial seat for similar obsessive publications".
- Giuseppe Ciarrapico, Italian entrepreneur, publisher and politician. President of the football club AS Roma from 1991 and 1993, and a senator of Italy for Silvio Berlusconi's The People of Freedom party in 2008-2012. Ciarrapico was convicted and imprisoned several times due to his involvement in financial scandals. The Samif-Italsanità healthcare scandal led to his imprisonment at Regina Coeli on 21 March 1993.
- Stefano Cucchi, a young building surveyor, imprisoned on 15 October 2009 after being found in possession of some packs of hashish, 2 grams of cocaine and a pill of a medicine for epilepsy. Died on 22 October due to police brutality. The film On My Skin depicts the events surrounding his death.
- Joseph J. Henn, a Salvadoran and former Catholic priest who fled to Italy, was held in the prison in 2019 before he was extradited to the United States, where he faces sex abuse charges in Arizona.

== Bibliography ==
- Olga Touloumi. The Prison of Regina Coeli: A Laboratory of Identity in the Post-Risorgimento Italy. MIT Thesis, 2006 The prison of Regina Coeli : a laboratory of identity in the Post-Risorgimento Italy
