= Piero Terracina =

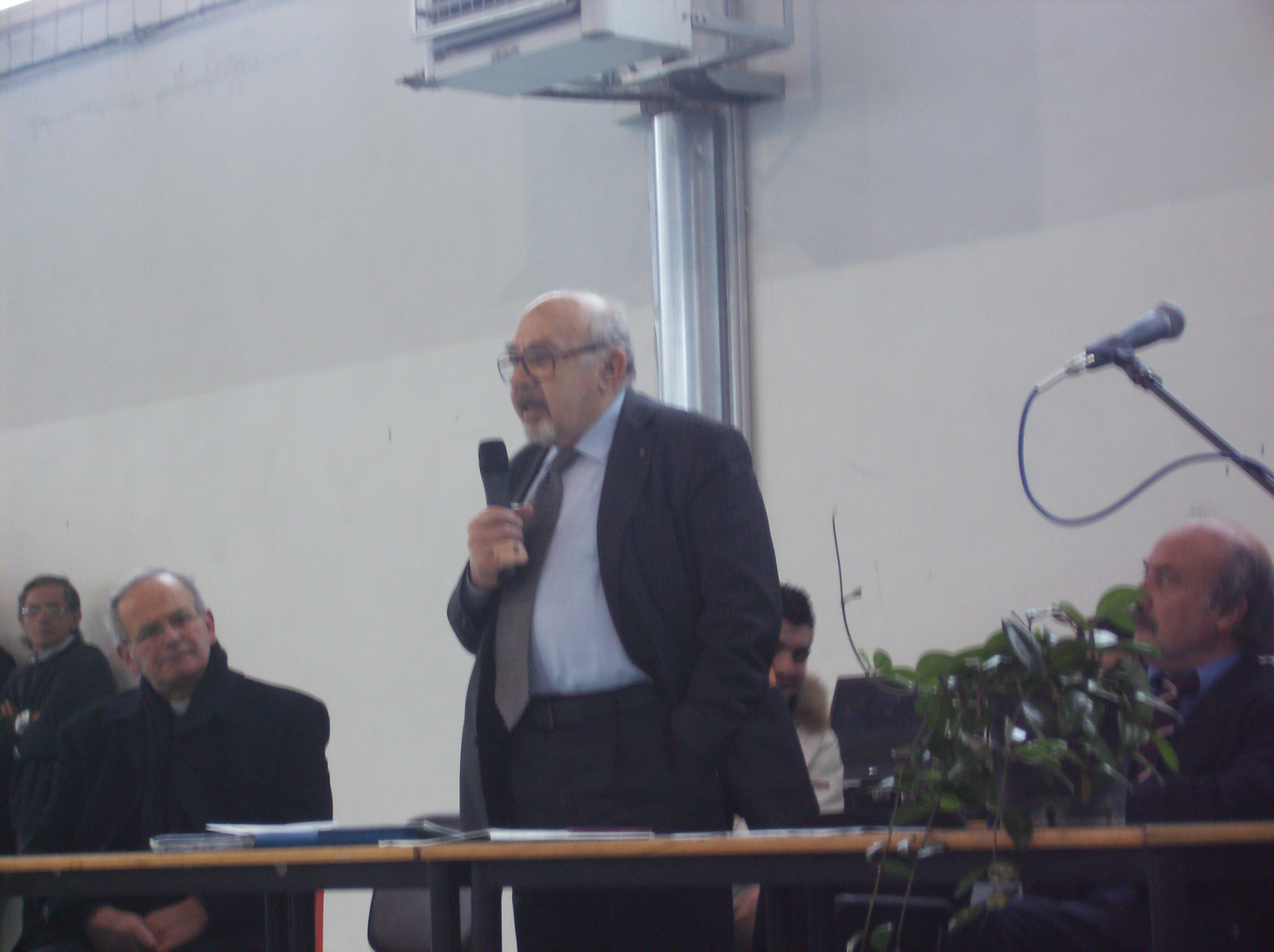
- Born: 12 November 1928; Rome, Italy
- Died: 8 December 2019 (aged 91); Rome, Italy
- Writing career
- Language: Italian

Piero Terracina (12 November 1928 – 8 December 2019) was an Italian Jewish manager and Holocaust survivor.

He was one of the survivors of the extermination camp at Auschwitz in Nazi-occupied Poland.

== Biography ==
=== Early life ===
He was born in Rome into an Italian Jewish family, the last of the four children of Giovanni Terracina and Lidia Ascoli. In the autumn of 1938, due to the enactment of Fascist racial laws, Piero, like all Jewish students and teachers, was expelled from Italian public school. Terracina continued his studies in Jewish schools until the summer of 1943. Until the autumn of 1938, Italian Jews were in all considered Italians, inserted fully in the Italian economic and social activity. Unfortunately, under the pressure of German Nazism, Italian Fascism also had to align itself and proceed with the slowdowns of Jewish families. After escaping the catch of October 16, 1943, which took place throughout Rome, he was arrested on April 7, 1944, in Rome, following a report from an informer, together with the whole family: the parents, his sister Anna, the brothers Cesare and Leo, uncle Amedeo, grandfather Leone David. All Italians, before being Jews, no one objected in 1944, in order not to fall victim to the fascist regime and suffer the same deportation to the extermination camps reserved for opponents and Jews. The whole Terracina family was detained for a few days in the Regina Coeli prison in Rome, and after a brief stay in the Fossoli camp, on 17 May 1944, was then sent to deportation.

=== Auschwitz ===
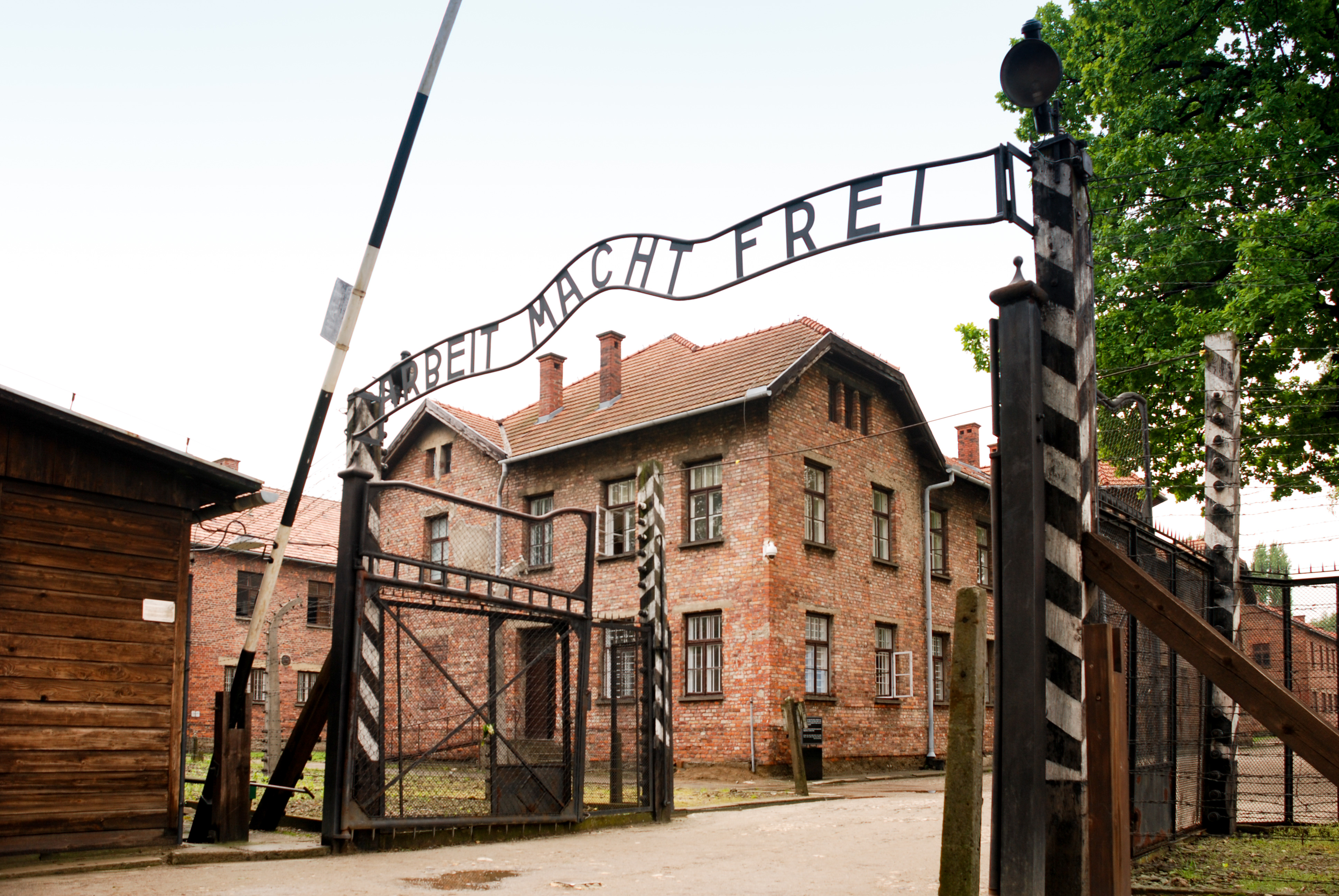
Auschwitz

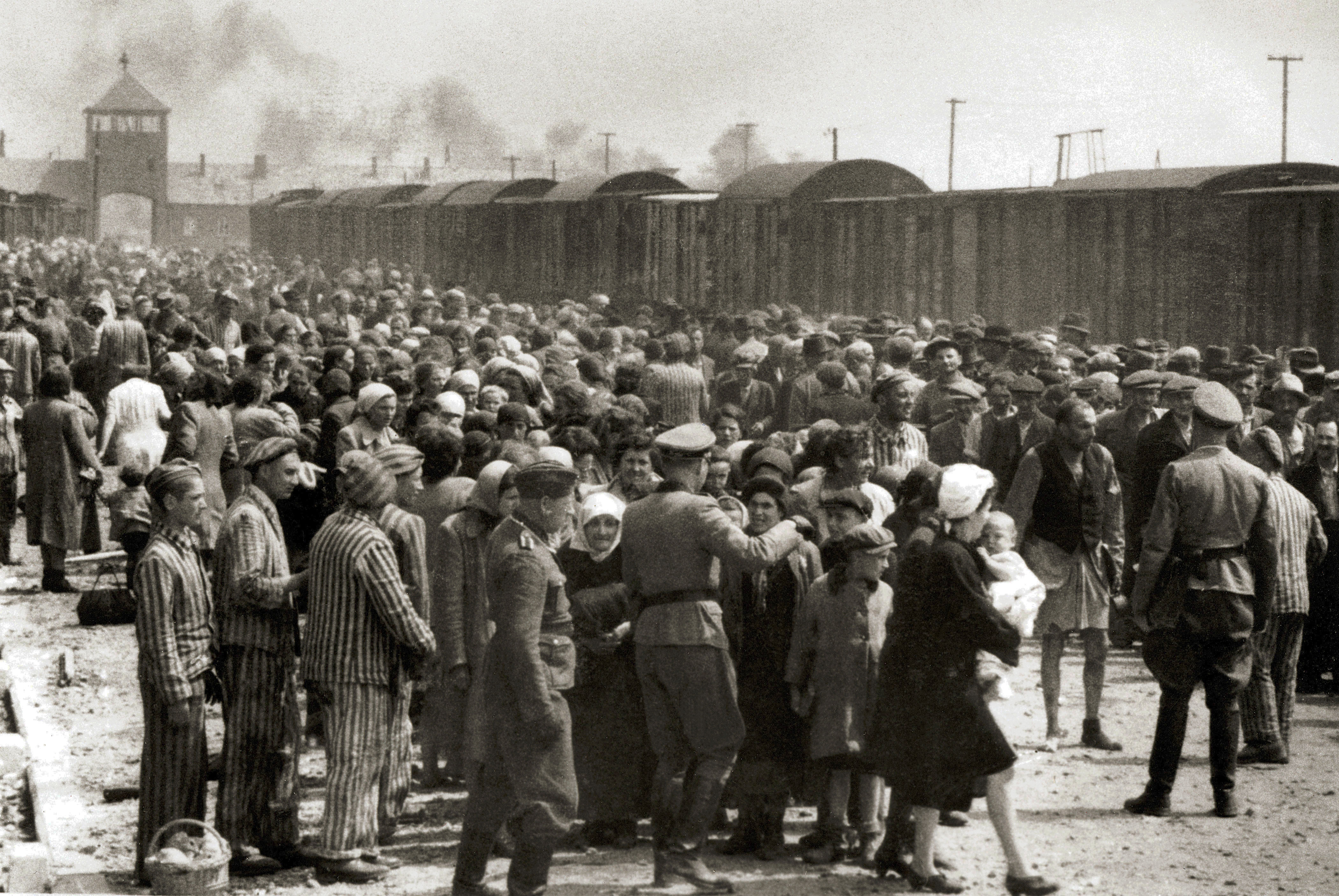
Auschwitz in 1944

An inhuman travel by train to the Auschwitz death camp, in a wagon crammed, in 64 persons, beyond horror, in crying and painting also children. Nobody could intervene in the train stations, the SS guarded the convoy. As soon as they arrived in Auschwitz-Birkenau, the whole family Terracina was exterminated on the day of arrival except Piero. The extermination camp, not as we see it today, in perpetual testimony of inhuman violence, was immersed in the black smoke of the chimneys. Piero was beaten and divided by the rest of his family. His mother embraced him and never saw her again, the father with his grandfather, as they started towards the gas chamber, greeted him, while he was imprisoned, stripped and shaved, marked with the number A-5506. He asks another prisoner where his parents were and is told that they have been murdered and burned and come out as black smoke from the chimneys. He experienced an unspeakable pain. He was a prisoner, plundered of his dignity as a human being, not a man but an object, a piece. The experience in the Auschwitz death camp was terrifying and here he met another young Italian deportee, Sami Modiano, from Rhodes, only two years younger than him. Piero and Samuel become fraternal friends, who work together to survive. On January 27, 1945, the Allies freed the prisoners of Auschwitz; Piero and Samuel, with other few Italian survivors, including Primo Levi, were freed. The return to life for Piero, as for all Holocaust survivors, was long and painful.

=== Soviet Union ===
Weighing only 38 kilos, he was taken by the Russians to a military hospital. He was later taken to the hospital in Lviv. Here he was treated and became aware of the horror suffered, of the inhuman violence of the Nazis. After some time he was sent to a sanatorium in the Black Sea. Here he returns to live. He thanks those who have cured and saved him and after a year he returns to Italy.

== Testimony ==
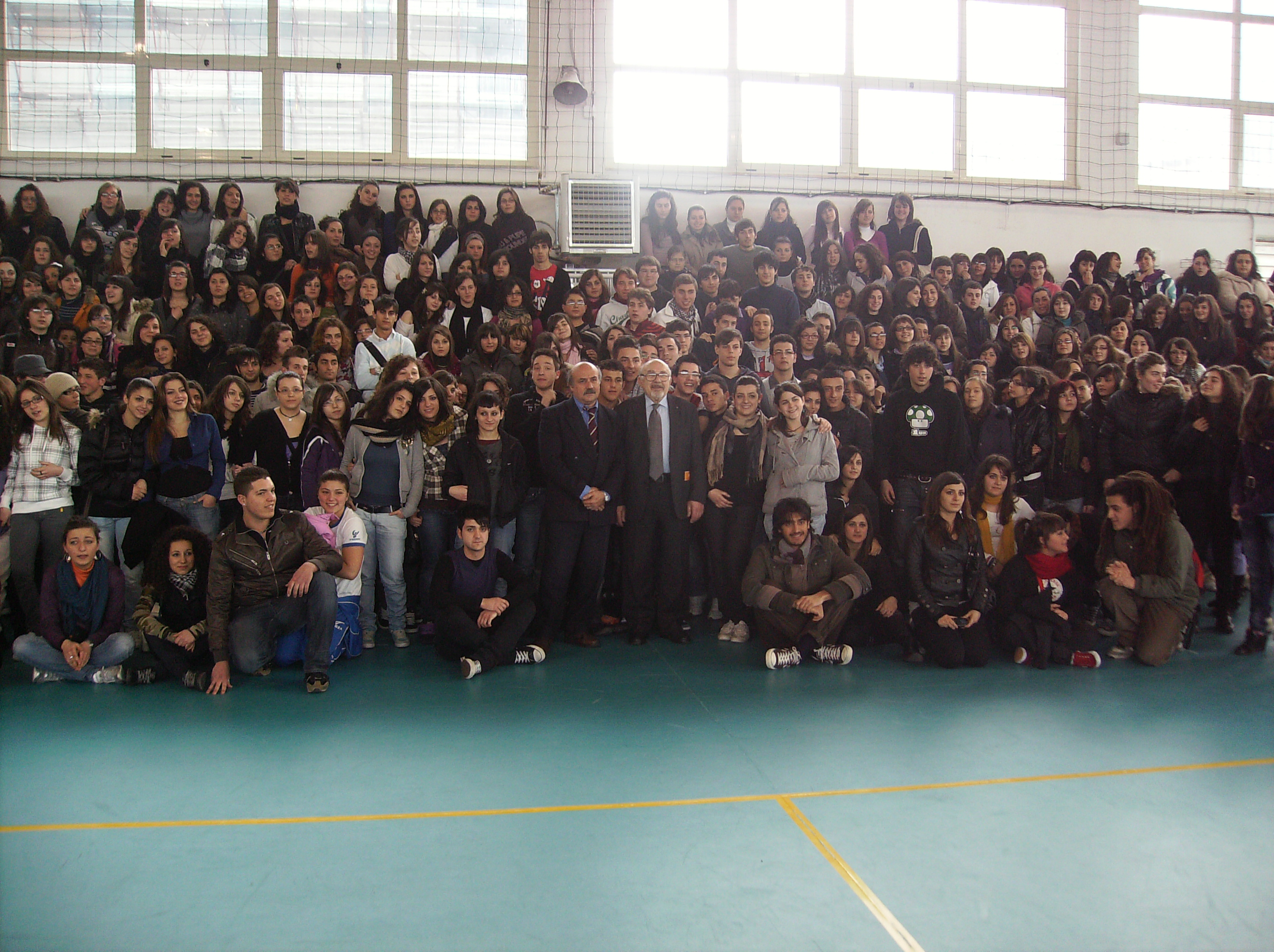
Piero Terracina together with the students of IIS "Pomponio Leto" at the end of a meeting - debate in Teggiano (SA) on 5 March 2009

Since 1980, he performed actions of testimony of the Holocaust, conducting meetings in schools, associations, universities, conferences, training seminars, military institutions, radio and television programs and prisons in Italy. In 1997 he was among the witnesses of the documentary film Memoria presented at the Berlin Film Festival. He also participated in travels for memory of the Holocaust with schools.

=== Death ===
He died on 8 December, 2019 in Rome. Three days earlier, the municipality of Campobasso had granted him honorary citizenship. He is buried in the Verano cemetery, next to Shlomo Venezia, who also survived Auschwitz.
