= Maria Therese von Wüllenweber =

German religious sister and Blessed

Blessed Maria Therese von Wüllenweber SDS
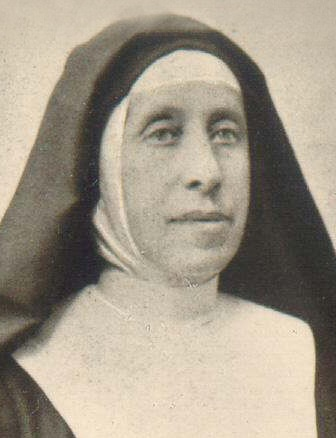
- c. 1900

Virgin
- Born: 19 February 1833; Mönchengladbach, Düsseldorf, German Confederation
- Died: 25 December 1907 (aged 74); Rome
- Venerated in: Roman Catholic Church
- Beatified: 13 October 1968, Saint Peter's Basilica by Pope Paul VI
- Feast: 5 September

Maria Therese von Wüllenweber, SDS, religious name Maria of the Apostles, (19 February 1833 – 25 December 1907) was a German religious sister in the Roman Catholic Church. She established the Sisters of the Divine Savior – also referred to as the Salvatorian Sisters – with the assistance of the priest Francis Mary of the Cross Jordan, founder of the Salvatorians.

She was beatified on 13 October 1968 after Pope Paul VI recognized two miracles attributed to her intercession.

== Life ==
Maria Therese von Wüllenweber was born at the family's castle of Myllendonk in 1833, as the eldest of five daughters to Baron Theodore von Wüllenweber. She was a spiritual child and felt drawn to religious life with a desire to join the missions. She was tutored by a governess until the age of fifteen, when her parents sent her to a Benedictine boarding school, La Paix Notre-Dame in Liège.

At the age of 24 Maria entered the Society of the Sacred Heart. She taught in the Warendorf and later in Orléans in France. She soon realized her vocation was not as that of a teacher and left religious life in March 1863 to return home. She maintained friendships with the Sacred Heart sisters throughout her life. Maria then spent a few weeks with the Visitandines in Mülheim, but chose not to pursue the life of a cloistered teaching nun. In 1869 that she became a novice with the Congregation of Perpetual Adoration in Brussels, but returned home the following year without taking vows.

She met Johann Baptist Jordan in mid-1882. With him she established the Sisters of the Divine Savior on 8 December 1888 as the new congregation's first superior in Tivoli. She died on Christmas in 1907 in Rome.

== Beatification ==
Her spiritual writings were approved by theologians on 23 December 1952. The beatification process commenced on 1 March 1955 under Pope Pius XII but the cause had commenced in Rome in a diocesan process prior to this, spanning from 1943 until 1949. The second process opened in 1955 after the formal introduction of the cause and concluded its business in 1957; the introduction of the cause granted her the title Servant of God. Both processes were ratified in 1959. Wüllenweber was declared to be venerable on 15 July 1965 after Pope Paul VI recognized a life of heroic virtue. He approved two miracles attributed to her intercession in mid-1968 and beatified her on 13 October 1968 in Saint Peter's Basilica.
