= Franziska Streitel =

German religious sister (1844-1911)

Venerable Franziska Streitel
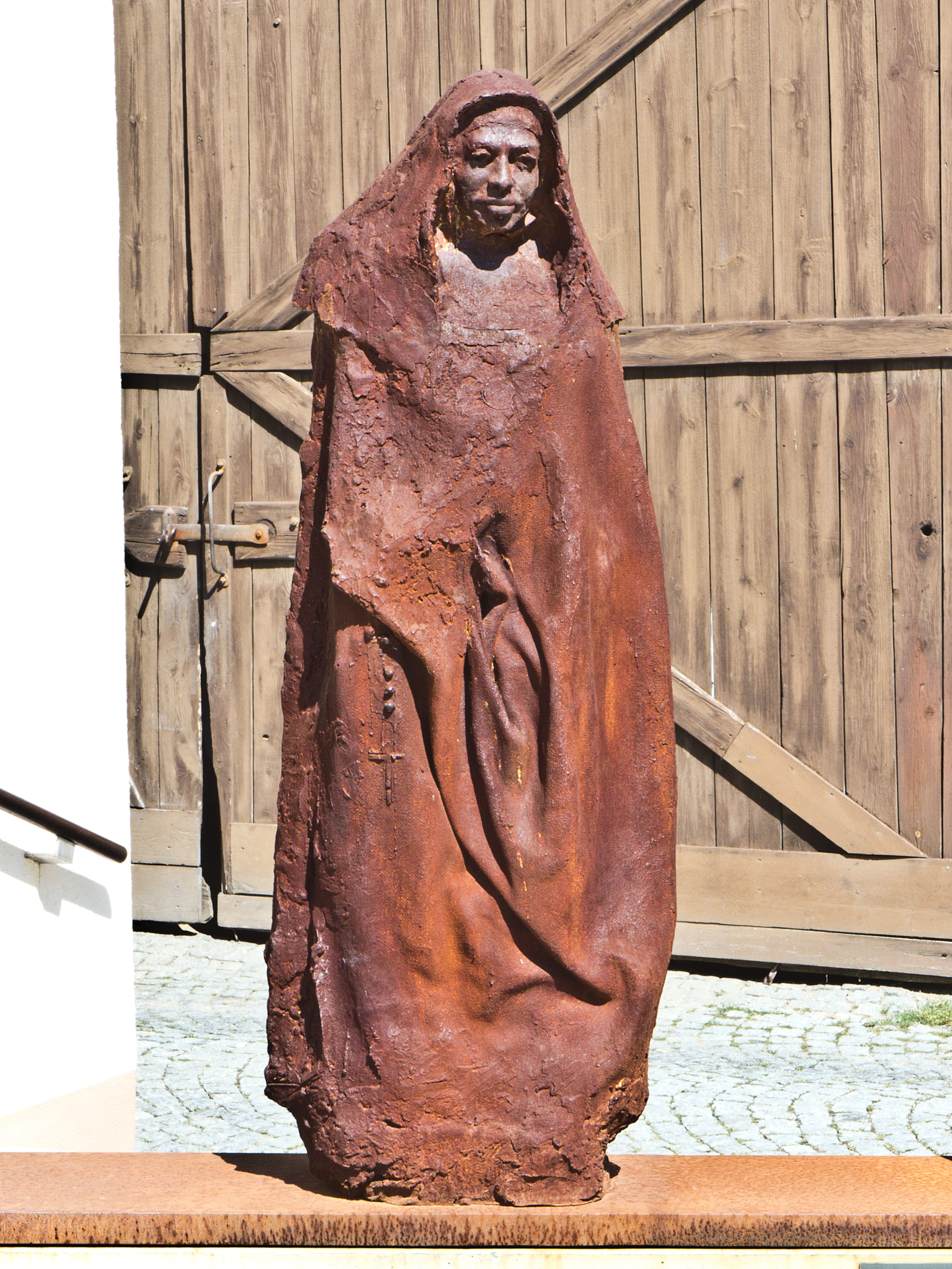
- Statue of Franziska Streitel in Mellrichstadt, Germany
- Born: 24 November 1844; Mellrichstadt, Rhön-Grabfeld, Kingdom of Bavaria
- Died: 6 March 1911 (aged 66); Castel Sant’Elia, Viterbo, Kingdom of Italy

Franziska Streitel (born Amalia Streitel, religious name Maria Franziska of the Cross, 24 November 1844 – 6 March 1911) was a German religious sister in the Roman Catholic Church. Streitel founded the Sisters of the Sorrowful Mother. In 2010 she was proclaimed to be venerable after the recognition of her life of heroic virtue.

== Life ==
Streitel was born in Mellrichstadt, on 24 November 1844, the eldest of four children to Adam and Franziska Horhammer Streitel. At an early age, she became skillful in needlework. After her elementary education, Amalia was sent to the Franciscan institute of Maria Stern in Augsburg. There she earned a diploma in French and music.

Streitel was trained to be a teacher, but at the age of seventeen, felt drawn to religious life. Her parents opposed her vocation but relented when she reached the age of 21. In September 1866, she returned to the Franciscan Institute in Augsburg. On her investiture as a novice in June 1867, she got the name Mary Angela. In 1868, she began teaching, French, music, and needlework to students at a convent in Munich. From 1872 until 1880 she directed an orphanage.

Drawn to a life of contemplation and solitude, she went, with the consent of her local bishop to the Carmelite convent of Himmelspforten in Würzburg, but left the very same year, due to "a divine inspiration" and returned to her parents house.

According to the wishes of her confessor, she relocated to Rome in 1883, in order to work with Francis Mary of the Cross Jordan and the congregation that he had established. Together they founded another community, the Society of the Divine Saviour. Only twelve days after her arrival in Rome, Sr. Maria Angela took vows and the new religious name Maria Franziska of the Cross.

The rule she drew up were marked by great severity concerning evangelical poverty and austerity of life. Jordan felt the strict regulations concerning fasting were a bit rigorous for a congregation destined for strenuous works of charity in hospitals, schools and missions. She and Father Jordan had different personalities and charisms and it led to a split between the two.

On 4 October 1885 she established a new community. Pope Leo XIII gave it the name of the Sisters of the Sorrowful Mother. It received the papal approval of Pope Pius X on the date of her death. It melded the charisms of the Carmelite and the Franciscan order.

Streitel died on 6 March 1911. The congregation continues its work in Europe and has expanded to Africa and South America.

== Beatification process ==
The beatification process commenced with two local processes in Civita Castellana and also in Würzburg. Streitel's spiritual writings were approved by theologians on 26 February 1943, and her cause was formally opened on 13 June 1947 under Pope Pius XII, granting her the title of Servant of God. The two processes – in order for the cause to proceed – received formal decrees of ratification on 3 February 1952. The Positio – documentation and an account of her life – was submitted to the Congregation for the Causes of Saints in 2004.

The declaration of her life of heroic virtue was announced on 27 March 2010 which allowed for Pope Benedict XVI to confer upon her the title of Venerable. The miracle needed for her beatification was investigated and was ratified in 2004. The Medical Board that advises the Congregation for the Causes of Saints approved the miracle in mid 2010.
