= Mercy Medical Center (Oshkosh, Wisconsin) =

- Ascension Northeast Wisconsin
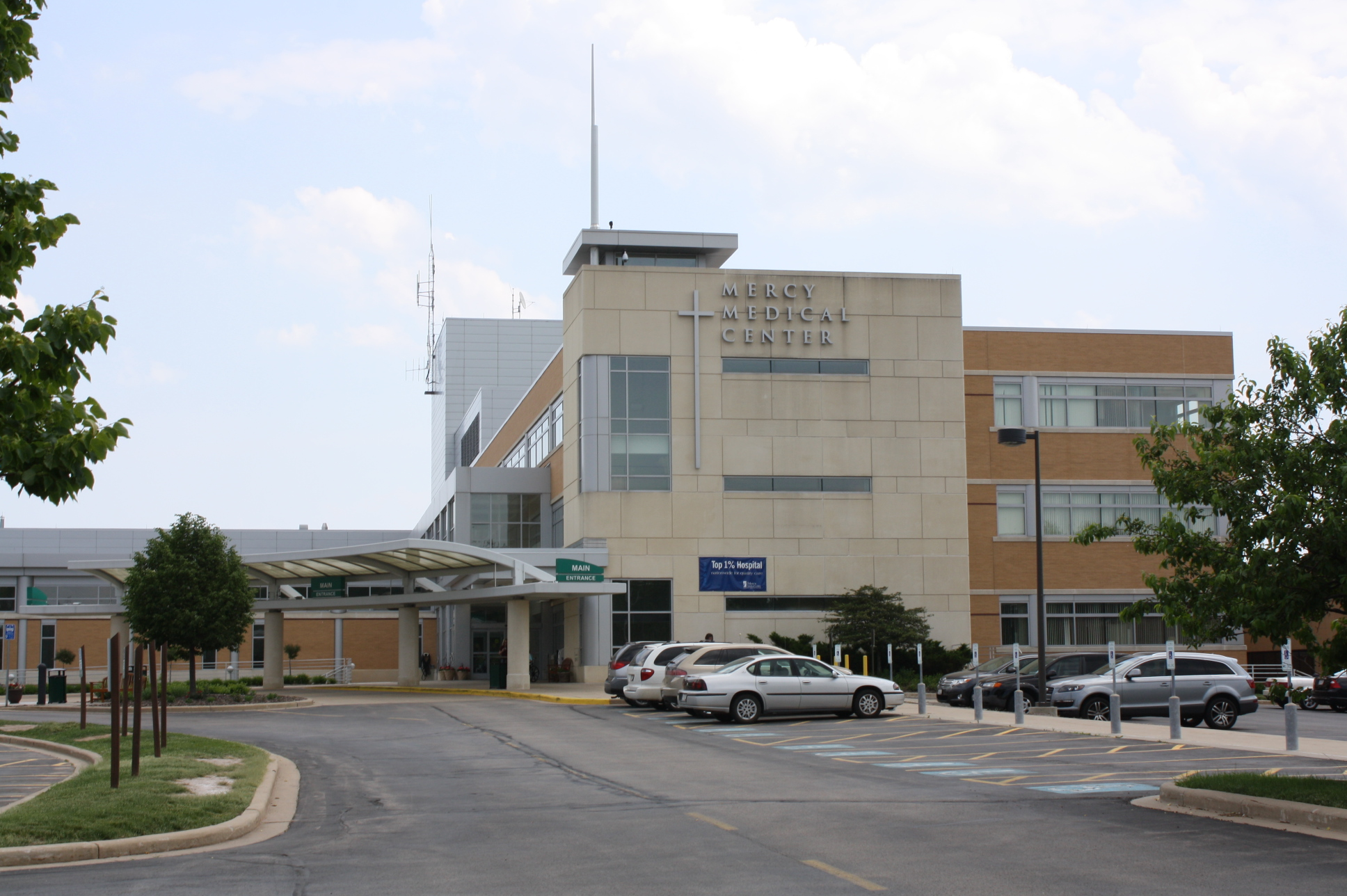
- Main entrance

- Location in Wisconsin Mercy Medical Center (Oshkosh, Wisconsin) (the United States)

Geography
- Location: Oshkosh, Wisconsin, United States
- Coordinates: 44.012886°N 88.601101°W

Organization
- Care system: Ascension Health

Services
- Emergency department: Level III trauma center

Helipads
- Helipad: (FAA LID: WS50)
Number	Length		Surface
Number	ft	m	Surface
H1	40	12	Concrete

History
- Founded: 1891

Links
- Website: www.affinityhealth.org/Mercy-Medical-Center
- Lists: Hospitals in Wisconsin

Mercy Medical Center, officially Ascension Northeast Wisconsin Mercy Hospital, is a hospital founded in 1891 that serves the city of Oshkosh, in Winnebago County, Wisconsin. Its emergency department is a level III trauma center.

== History ==
Mercy Medical Center was founded by Father Roman Scholter, pastor of St. Mary's Church in 1891. He convinced the Sisters of the Sorrowful Mother to come to Oshkosh and start St. Mary's Hospital. In 1895 the hospital moved into a four-story facility on the corner of Merritt and Boyd Streets which could accommodate 26 patients. In 1918, St. Mary's bought Lakeside Hospital on the other side town which they renamed as Mercy Hospital. The current building opened in 2000.

As of February 2018, the St. Mary's building operates as city-owned low-income apartments. The Lakeside Hospital building operates as a retirement community.

== Affiliations ==
Mercy Medical Center associated with Appleton's St. Elizabeth Hospital in 1995 to form the Affinity Health System, which later incorporated Calumet Medical Center in 1998.

The hospitals and clinics of Affinity Health System were absorbed by and began using the Ascension name beginning September 20, 2016.
