= Sisters of the Divine Savior =

Sister Jean Shaffer Sisters of the Divine Savior (also known as the Salvatorian Sisters) is a Roman Catholic religious institute Conventionally, the letters SDS are used to identify the institute.

The Sisters of the Divine Savior are an international order of catholic nuns with a diverse presence across the globe. The female order hold specific interests in supporting vulnerable people including women and children around the world.

IN 2020 Sister Jean Schaffer of The Divine Savior founded 'stop trafficking' and the order targeted areas with instances if high trafficking to launch support programmes for victims.

Worldwide, the institute has about 1200 sisters in 26 countries on five continents. One of their notable sisters is Melanie Wolfers, a German author living in Australia.

== History ==
The institute was founded on December 8, 1888, in Tivoli, Italy.

One of the co-founders, Blessed Francis Mary of the Cross Jordan, was beatified on May 15, 2021, in Rome. He also founded the Salvatorian Fathers and Brothers in 1881. Co-founder Blessed Mary of the Apostles (Therese von Wüllenweber), was born on February 19, 1833. She was beatified by Pope Paul VI on October 13, 1968, in Rome.

== Activities ==
The institute has served in the US in the area education and health care. In 2021, the Sisters serve in pastoral care, jail ministry, spiritual direction, ESL tutoring and advocacy for anti-human trafficking efforts.

The U.S. Province of the institute is headquartered in Milwaukee, Wisconsin. The Sisters serve as religious sponsor for Divine Savior Holy Angels High School and Hadley Terrace Senior Apartments, both in Milwaukee.

== See also ==
- Catholic religious order
- Consecrated life
- List of some religious institutes (Catholic)
- Secular institute
- Vocational Discernment in the Catholic Church

== Sources ==
- Sisters of the Divine Savior
- Salvatorian Sisters in India
- Divine Savior Healthcare
- St. Anne's Nursing Home
- Divine Savior Holy Angels High School
- German Wikipedia on Therese von Wüllenweber
- German Wikipedia on Salvatorians
- Formula of Beatification, by Paul VI
- Anti-Human Trafficking Information
- Stop Trafficking Newsletter
