= Wilhelm Wilmers =

German Jesuit professor of philosophy and theology

Wilhelm Wilmers (b. at Boke in Westphalia, 30 January 1817; d. at Roermond, Netherlands, 9 May 1899) was a German Jesuit professor of philosophy and theology.

== Life ==
He entered the Society of Jesus in 1834 at Brieg in the canton of Valais, Switzerland, was expelled from the country with the other Jesuits in 1847, and ordained priest at Ay in Southern France in 1848. Shortly after, he taught philosophy at Issenheim in Alsace, then exegesis at the Catholic University of Leuven, theology at Cologne, philosophy at Bonn and Aachen, and theology at Maria-Laach.

In 1860 Cardinal Geissel requested Wilmer's services as theologian at the provincial council of Cologne. Wilmers also attended the First Vatican Council in 1870 as theologian of Bishop Leo Meurin, Vicar Apostolic of Bombay.

After a brief residence at Bonn and Munster, he went to Ordrupshoj near Copenhagen where he wrote against the attacks on the Catholic Church by the Protestant preacher Martensen. This work was translated into Danish by the prefect Apostolic Hermann Grüder and published under the latter's name with the title: "Det protestaniske og katholiske Trosprincip" (Copenhagen, 1875).

In 1876 Wilmers was called by Cardinal Archbishop Louis Pie to the theological faculty of Poitiers. In 1880 he lectured on theology to the French Jesuits in Saint Helier, Jersey. Thenceforward he devoted himself entirely to writing, living first at Ditton Hall, England, and then at Exaten in the Netherlands.

== Works ==
Besides the above treatise, Wilmers wrote:

- "Lehrbuch der Religion" (1855–57);
- "Geschichte der Religion" (1856), translated into several languages;
- "Lehrbuch der Religion fur höhere Lehranstalted" (1869);
- "Handbuch der Religion" (1871).

These treatises were frequently republished. His last works were "De religione revelata" and "De Christi ecclesia" (1897); he nearly finished the third volume of this series "De fide divina", which was published in 1902.
