= Gerhard Jorch =

German pediatrician (born 1951)

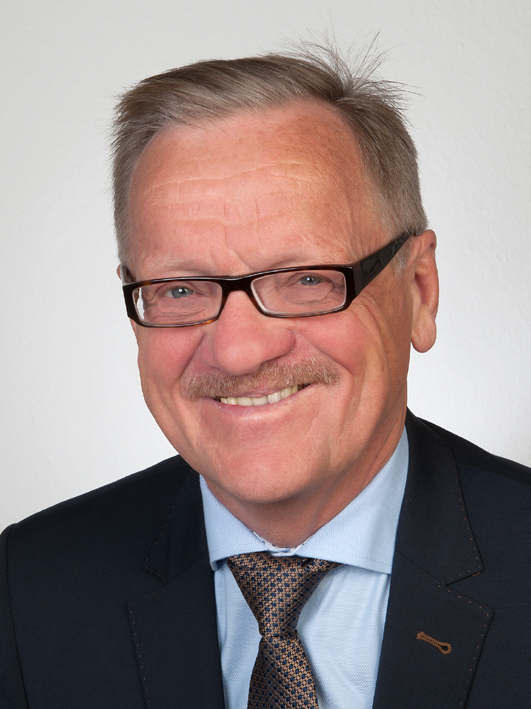
Gerhard Jorch

Gerhard Jorch (born 1951 in Neuhaus/Paderborn Germany) is a German pediatrician. He is Professor for general pediatrics and neonatology at the Otto-von-Guericke University of Magdeburg and director of the University children's hospital.

== Curriculum vitae ==
Gerhard Jorch was born as the eldest of seven siblings in Neuhaus. He got highschool education at Gymnasium Theodorianum Paderborn and thereafter performed his medical study at the Philipps-University of Marburg from 1970-1977 supported by a national grant (Studienstiftung des Deutschen Volkes). He finished his doctoral thesis work (Dr. med.) in 1976. From 1977 – 1982 he performed pediatric training at the Friedrich-Wilhelms-University of Münster and became assistant medical director of the pediatric and neonatal care unit of the university children's hospital in 1982. In 1985 he finished his habilitation thesis work (Dr.med. habil.) and was nominated as university lecturer (PD). He became (apl.) Professor for Pediatrics in 1990. In 1998 he was appointed by the Otto-von-Guericke University of Magdeburg as director of the Department for general pediatrics and neonatology and became head of the whole university hospital of children in 2006. He is clinically specialized in neonatology, pediatric intensive care and neuropediatrics. After his retirement on September 30, 2018, Jorch has shifted the focus of his work to the supervision of mother-child centers in China. Jorch has nine children.:

== Research interests ==
His clinical research work focused on premature infants (brain blood circulation, surfactant) and sudden unexpected infant death ("SIDS"). Also he did some research on general pediatric health care (sauna for infants, primary prevention, smoking, vaccination). He was one of the first, who applied transfontanellar Doppler-ultrasonography to investigate neonatal cerebral circulation. His paper ("Thesenpapier") in the main German journal for physicians (Dt. Ärzteblatt) on the risk of prone position in 1991 was followed by a significant drop of unexpected infant deaths in Germany starting in 1992. In 1991 together with his university teacher Prof. Helmut Wolf he founded the European Neonatal Workshop with annual meetings until now. He consults parents premature born infants by an expert webpage since 2002. He was chairman of 2 German official medical guidelines (AWMF-Leitlinien): Pediatric head injury and Neonatal seizures.

== Publications ==
Gerhard Jorch has published 300 publications since 1977, 125 of them in international journals. He gave about 500 lectures at conferences and congresses. He is editor of the journals Intensive Medicine up2date and the NeionatologieScan.

He is the publisher of the following books

- Preterm birth: advice and help for the first months of life (parent counselor at Herder-Verlag)(only in German)
- Premature babies: Advice and help for affected parents (Urania Verlag)(only in German)
- Clinical Guide Pediatrics intensive (Elsevier Verlag)(only in German)
- Neonatology: The medicine of premature and premature babies (Thieme-Verlag)(only in German)
- Fetoneonatal neurology: disorders of the nervous system from the 20th week of gestation to the 20th month of life (Thieme-Verlag)(only in German)
- Fetoneonatal lung (Thieme Verlag)(only in German)
- Fetoneonatal Infectiology (Thieme Verlag)(only in German)
- The Sudden Infant Death (Springer Verlag)(only in German)
- DIVI annual 2014/2015: Continuing education and science in interdisciplinary intensive care and emergency medicine
- DIVI annual 2015/2016: Continuing education and science in interdisciplinary intensive care and emergency medicine
- DIVI annual 2016/2017: Continuing education and science in interdisciplinary intensive care and emergency medicine

=== Selected publications ===
- Anand, KJ (2001). "Consensus statement for the prevention and management of pain in the newborn". Arch Pediatr Adolesc Med. 155 (2): 173–80. doi:10.1001/archpedi.155.2.173. PMID 11177093.
- Carpenter, RG; Irgens, LM; Blair, PS; England, PD; Fleming, P; Huber, J; Jorch, G; Schreuder, P (2004). "Sudden unexplained infant death in 20 regions in Europe: case control study". The Lancet. 363 (9404): 185–191. doi:10.1016/S0140-6736(03)15323-8. PMID 14738790. S2CID 28243268.
- Vennemann, M.M.; Bajanowski, T.; Brinkmann, B.; Jorch, G.; Yucesan, K.; Sauerland, C.; Mitchell, E.A.; Study Group, GeSID (2009). "Does Breastfeeding Reduce the Risk of Sudden Infant Death Syndrome?". Pediatrics. 123 (3): e406–e410. doi:10.1542/peds.2008-2145. PMID 19254976. S2CID 14792631.
- Vennemann, Mechtild; Findeisen, Martina; Butterfaß-Bahloul, Trude; Jorch, Gerhard; Brinkmann, Bernd; Köpcke, Wolfgang; Bajanowski, T; Mitchell, Ed (2005). "Modifiable Risk Factors for SIDS in Germany: Results of GeSID". Acta Paediatrica. 94 (6): 655–660. doi:10.1080/08035250410024231. PMID 16188764.
- Rißmann, A.; Al-Karawi, J.; Jorch, G. (2002). "Infant's Physiological Response to Short Heat Stress During Sauna Bath". Klinische Pädiatrie. 214 (3): 132–135. doi:10.1055/s-2002-30149. PMID 12015647.
- Sperhake, Jan; Jorch, Gerhard; Bajanowski, Thomas (2018). "The prone sleeping position and SIDS. Historical aspects and possible pathomechanisms". International Journal of Legal Medicine. 132 (1): 181–185. doi:10.1007/s00414-017-1749-5. PMID 29177808. S2CID 19353219.
