= Pankratius Pfeiffer =

The Very Reverend Pankratius Pfeiffer SDS
- Born: Markus Pfeiffer; 18 October 1872; Brunnen, Bavaria, German Empire
- Died: 13 May 1945 (aged 72); Rome, Kingdom of Italy

Orders
- Ordination: 30 May 1896

Pankratius Pfeiffer SDS (Italian: Pancrazio Pfeiffer; born Markus Pfeiffer; 18 October 1872 – 13 May 1945) was a German Catholic priest and superior general of the Salvatorian order for 30 years. During the Nazi occupation of Rome during the Second World War, he acted as an informal liaison between Pope Pius XII and the German leadership. In this capacity, he rescued hundreds of Jews and others in Rome from execution by the Nazis. He also persuaded the Nazis to spare several Italian cities from destruction during their retreat from Italy. As a result, Pfeiffer became known as "the Angel of Rome."

== Early life ==
Markus Pfeiffer was born on 18 October 1872 in Brunnen, Bavaria, in the German Empire. On 18 March 1889, he traveled to Rome, and on 21 March, he entered the Society of the Divine Savior, commonly known as the Salvatorians, taking the religious name of Pankratius. He was ordained a priest on 30 May 1896. His first assignment was as the private secretary to the founder and superior general of the Salvatorian order, Francis Mary of the Cross Jordan, and was stationed at the Salvatorian motherhouse, Palazzo Cesi-Armellini, in Rome.

== Salvatorian leadership ==
The Salvatorians' first general chapter was convened in 1902, where Pfeiffer was elected procurator general. While holding this position, he also became a consultor to Jordan. In 1908, he began work in the Vatican, in the office overseeing papal audiences.

Due to the outbreak of the First World War, the Salvatorian generalate moved from Rome to Fribourg, Switzerland. The third general chapter was held in Fribourg 1915, at which Pfeiffer was elected to succeed Jordan as superior general of the Society of the Divine Savior. Pfeiffer was considered an effective leader of the order, despite a financial crisis in 1930.

=== Role in saving Jews and others from the Nazis ===
During the Second World War, Pfeiffer became an informal liaison between Pope Pius XII and the German leadership during the occupation of Rome by the Nazis in 1943 and 1944. In this capacity, he saved many Jews in Rome from persecution and ultimately death. During the occupation, Pfeiffer would travel every two days to the Secretariat of State of the Holy See, where he would inform the secretariat of Jews who had been arrested and would receive the Vatican's requests for release to be delivered to the Nazis.

It is unknown precisely how many Jews were saved due to the efforts of Pfeiffer. On one occasion, the pope used Pfeiffer as an intermediary to speak with General Reiner Stahel, the commander of Nazi forces in Rome, and Heinrich Himmler, to secure the release of 249 Jews that had been rounded up. On another occasion, Pfeiffer persuaded the Nazis to release 400 hostages, eight of whom were Jews, who were being transported to their execution by firing squad.

In addition to Jews, Pfeiffer saved others from the Nazis. Every day, Pfeiffer visited the Regina Coeli prison and another prison on Via Tasso, where he would often return with freed prisoners who had been sentenced to death. During the German retreat from Italy in 1945, Pfeiffer also convinced the Nazis to refrain from destroying several Italian cities. As a result of his efforts saving people from the Nazis, Pfeiffer became known as "the Angel of Rome".

== Death ==
On 12 May 1945, Pfeiffer was knocked down by a British military jeep as he tried to cross the road to the Vatican. He died the following day. On the day of his death, Vatican Radio paid tribute to him for his actions during the Second World War. He was succeeded as superior general by Facundus Peterk.

A short street in Rome off of Via della Conciliazione was named in his honor.

Catholic Church titles
Preceded by Francis Mary of the Cross Jordan	2nd Superior General of the Society of the Divine Savior; 1915–1945	Succeeded by Facundus Peterek
