= Louis Baunard =

French rector of the Catholic University of Lille and historian

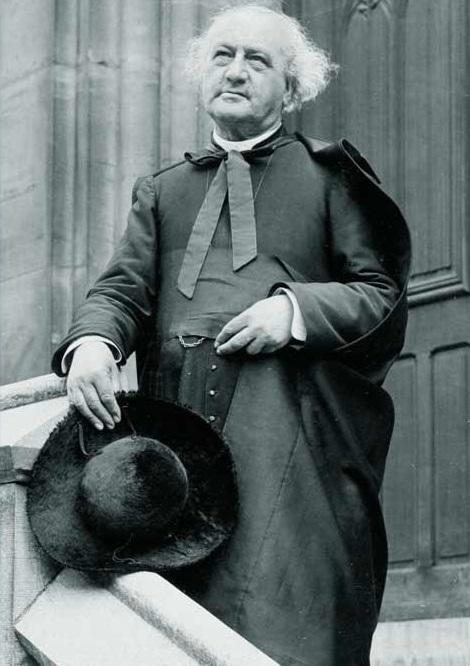
L'abbé Louis Baunard.

Louis Baunard (24 August 1828 – 9 November 1919) was a French rector of the Catholic University of Lille and historian.

== Biography ==
Baunard was born at Bellegarde-en-Gâtinais (Loiret), France, on 24 August 1828, and died in the departement of Nord, in Gruson on 9 November 1919. He was one of the clergy of Orléans, until 1877, after which he was attached to the Catholic University of Lille, first as professor, and later as rector. No Catholic university profited more by the Law of 1875 that granted freedom of higher education.

Baunard received the degree of Doctor of Letters, in 1860.

== Works ==
In the two theses which he wrote he treated of the pedagogy of Plato and of Theodulphus, Bishop of Orléans in the time of Charlemagne.

As hagiographer he wrote on St. John the Apostle (1869) and St. Ambrose (1871). He wrote the biographies of Saint Louise de Marillac, the foundress of the Daughters of Charity (1898); of (Madame) Saint Madeleine Sophie Barat (1876), foundress of the Ladies of the Sacred Heart; of Vicomte Armand de Melun (1880), Cardinal Pie, Bishop of Poitiers (1886), Cardinal Lavigerie (1896), Ernest Lelièvre, co-founder of the Little Sisters of the Poor (1905), and Philibert Vrau, the Christian manufacturer (1906).

The French religious history of the nineteenth century was summarized by him in Un siècle de l'Eglise de France (1901). He contributed notable works of religious psychology in his books, Le doute et ses victimes (1865), and La foi et ses victoires (1881–83). His Espérance (1892) deals with on the beginnings of the French religious revival at the end of the nineteenth century; his L'évangile du pauvre (1905) appeared during a period of social unrest.

== Books ==
- Histoire du cardinal Pie : évêque de Poitiers, H. Oudin, Poitiers, 1886)
- Histoire de la vénérable Mère Madeleine-Sophie Barat, fondatrice de la Société du Sacré-Cœur de Jésus, Librairie Poussièlgue Frères, 1ère édition en 1877, 4e édition en 1879
- La Foi et ses victoires (In-depth spiritual biographies in a catholic point-of-vue of Comte Schouvaloff, Donoso Cortès, Général de La Moricière, Joseph Droz, Frédéric Bastiat, Alexis de Tocqueville, Frédéric Le Play). In 2 volumes (1882-1884).
- Le Général de Sonis d'après ses papiers et sa correspondance, Poussielgue, Paris, 1890
- Le cardinal Lavigerie, éd. Ch. Poussielgue, Paris, 1896
- Théodulfe, évêque d'Orléans et Abbé de Fleury-sur-Loire, Orléans, 1860.
