= Religious of Perpetual Adoration =

Religious of Perpetual Adoration is a Roman Catholic religious order formed in 1857 by Anna de Meeus, in Brussels, Belgium.

== History ==
Anna de Meeûs (1823-1904) was the daughter of Count Ferdinand de Meeûs, who was a member of one of the leading families in Belgium, and founder of the Société du Crédit de la Charité, which focused on funding Catholic schools for poor children and shelters for the old and sick.

In 1843, de Meeus, then twenty years of age, at the request of the rector visited the sacristy of the church near their chateau and other churches and was struck by the miserable state of the vestments and all that pertained to the altar. She resolved to devote her time and money to procure better vestments, altar linen and plate. When word of her generosity became known, appeals for assistance arrived from other poor churches. With the help of noted retreat master Jean-Baptiste Boone, five additional churches were provided with all that was needed for divine services.

The Association of Perpetual Adoration and Work for Poor Churches was organized in 1848 under the direction of Boone. The necessity was soon felt that a religious body should be its centre and support. The project of a new religious institute was formed and realized when in 1857 de Meeus, directed by Boone, founded in Brussels the "Religious of Perpetual Adoration", a semi-apostolic congregation in the Belgian capital, focusing on religious instruction, retreats and the devotion for the Blessed Sacrament. The constitutions were definitively approved by Pope Pius IX (March, 1872). The institute has many houses in Europe.

In 1890, Bishop John Butt of Southwark invited the Sisters of Perpetual Adoration to set up a house in Balham. One of the main functions of the institute was the establishment and support of the various chapters of the Association (which in some locations came to be known as "The Tabernacle Society"). The Sisters established a house in Rome, from which the Association was run.

The institute's first foundation in America was at Washington, D. C., October, 1900. In the United States, the Tabernacle Societies were greatly supported by the Sisters of Notre Dame de Namur. Branches of the Tabernacle Society in one diocese would often help one another. For a time, the Diocese of Sault Sainte Marie-Marquette annually received large shipments of altar linens, vestments, and other items from the Society in Philadelphia.
