= Salvatorians =

Roman Catholic religious congregation for men

Society of the Divine Saviour
- Societas Divini Salvatoris (Latin)
- Abbreviation: Post-nominal letters: S.D.S.
- Nickname: Salvatorians
- Formation: 8 December 1881; 144 years ago
- Founder: Francis Mary of the Cross Jordan
- Founded at: Rome, Italy
- Type: Clerical Religious Congregation of Pontifical Right (for Men)
- Headquarters: Palazzo Cesi-Armellini; Via della Conciliazione 51, 00193 Rome, Italy
- Coordinates: 41°54′4.9″N 12°27′38.2″E
- Members: 1,137 members (832 priests) as of 2018
- Motto: Latin: Praedicate Evangelium omni Creaturae; English: Proclaim the Gospel to every creature
- Superior General: Krzysztof Kowalczyk
Ministry
Educational Parochial Mission	Campus ministry Chaplaincy
- Patron Saints: Blessed Virgin Mary (under the title Mother of the Savior); St. Joseph & St. Michael; The Apostles
- Parent organization: Catholic Church
- Website: http://www.sds.org/
- Formerly called: Apostolic Teaching Society; Catholic Teaching Society

The Society of the Divine Saviour (Latin: Societas Divini Salvatoris, SDS) and also known as the Salvatorians, is a clerical religious congregation of Pontifical Right for men in the Catholic Church. Members of the congregation use the postnominals SDS. It has clergy serving in more than 40 countries throughout the world. It was founded in Rome, Italy on 8 December 1881 by Francis Mary of the Cross Jordan. The Generalate of the community is in Rome, at Via della Conciliazione in Palazzo Cesi-Armellini. The current Superior General of the Salvatorians is Krzysztof Kowalczyk SDS.

It is dedicated to Jesus Christ as the "Divine Saviour". Its patron saints are the Blessed Virgin Mary as "Mother of the Savior", the Apostles, Michael the Archangel, Joseph and the Blessed Francis Jordan, the Founder. The patronal feast of the Society is Christmas Day, while 11 October is celebrated as the "Solemnity of Mary, Mother of the Savior". Other important liturgical celebrations include 21 July, the Feast of the Blessed Francis Jordan and 5 September, the Feast of Blessed Mary of the Apostles.

Other societies affiliated with the Salvatorians as part of the "Salvatorian Family" include the Sisters of the Divine Saviour and the International Community of the Divine Saviour (Lay Salvatorians).

== History ==
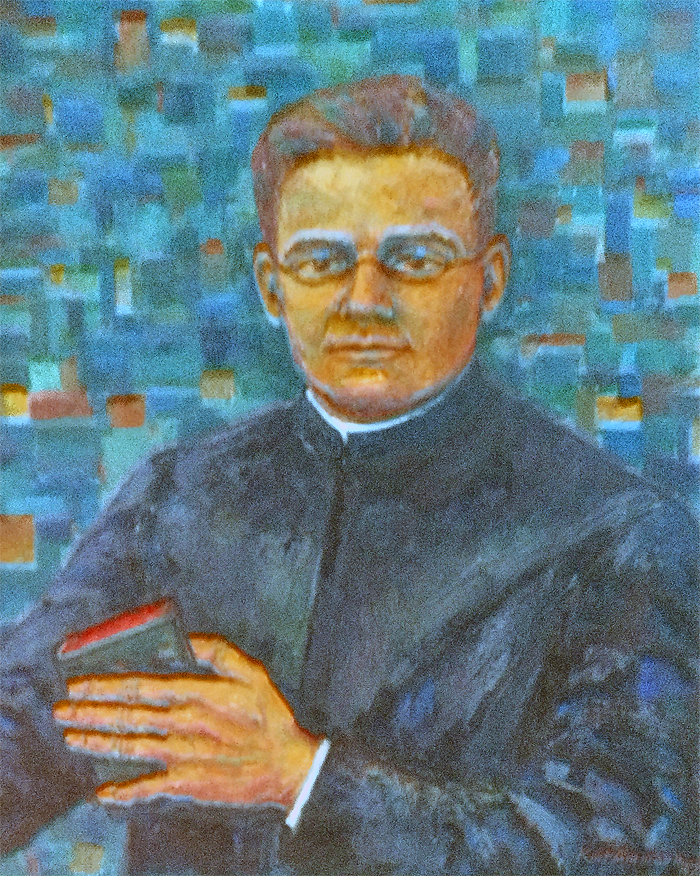
Franziskus Maria vom Kreuze Jordan

The Society of the Divine Savior was founded at Rome, on 8 December 1881, by Francis Mary of the Cross Jordan. The original name of the institute, Society of Catholic Instruction, was changed in 1893 to the present title. The Congregation of the Sisters of the Divine Savior was founded in December 1888, by Jordan, to complement the work of the Salvatorian Fathers.

On 13 December 1889, the new Prefecture Apostolic of Assam in present-day India was entrusted to the society. pl:Otto Hopfenmüller was named the first Apostolic Prefect. The fathers also published many books in the Khasi language. In September 1893, a college was established at Lochau, Austria; in the same year a station was founded at Corvallis, Oregon, United States. In 1896 several members began work in Brazil.

The first papal approbation was granted in the Decretum laudis of 27 May 1905.

In 1915 Pankratius Pfeiffer succeeded Jordan as Superior General. During the Nazi occupation of Rome in 1943 and 1944, Pfeiffer acted as an intermediary between Pope Pius XII and the German authorities. Every day he would visit the prisons of Regina Coeli and Via Tasso, returning with a freed prisoner.

== Spirituality and mission ==
The "Constitution" of the Society of the Divine Savior specifies that "Salvatorian life is apostolic and is the expression of the love of Christ urging us to spend ourselves for the salvation of all people... We proclaim Jesus Christ to all people by all ways and means which the love of Christ inspires, especially through the witness of our lives, our kindness, and our apostolic zeal. In fulfilling this ministry we always respect human dignity, and we are ready to serve all people without distinction" (§201-202).

Arno Boesing, a Salvatorian, attributes four primary biblical texts (John 17:3, Matthew 28:19–20, Mark 16:15, and Daniel 12:3) as being fundamental for understanding both the society's charism and spiritual vision of Francis Jordan. As of 2019, there are over 3,000 Salvatorians serving in 45 countries on six continents. Their goal is to proclaim salvation to all people by making known the "loving kindness of the Savior". Their work is not limited to one particular activity; members serve as pastors, catechists and teachers, home and foreign missionaries, chaplains, authors, musicians, counselors, spiritual directors, and in many other areas of ministry. They have also created initiatives in health, education, rural development, and pastoral formation, supported by the Salvatorian Office for International Aid.

== Notable Salvatorians ==
- Mary of the Apostles, co-foundress of the Sisters of the Divine Savior. She was beatified by Pope Paul VI in 1967.
- Bonaventure Lüthen (d. 1911), early Salvatorian and collaborator of Father Jordan.
- Robert Nugent, cofounder of New Ways Ministry, LGBT apostolate

== See also ==
- Catholic religious order
