= Francis Mary of the Cross Jordan =

German Catholic priest and religious founder

Blessed Francis Mary of the Cross Jordan SDS
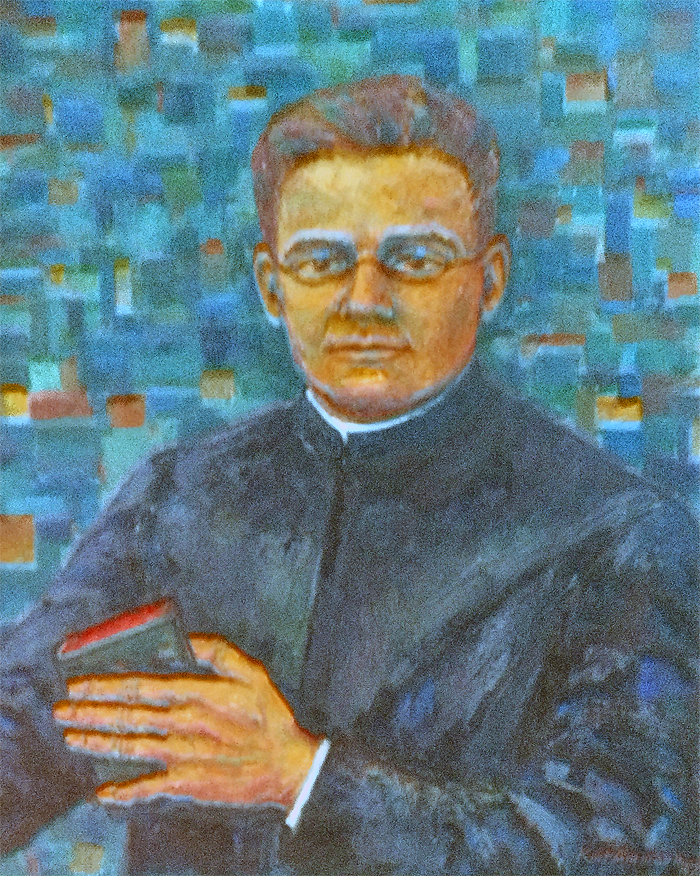
- Born: Johann Baptist Jordan; 16 June 1848; Gurtweil, Grand Duchy of Baden
- Died: 8 September 1918 (aged 70); Tafers, Canton of Fribourg, Switzerland
- Venerated in: Roman Catholic Church
- Beatified: 15 May 2021, Archbasilica of Saint John Lateran, Rome, Italy by Cardinal Angelo De Donatis
- Major shrine: Salvatorian Motherhouse, Rome, Italy
- Feast: 21 July

Francis Mary of the Cross Jordan, SDS (16 June 1848 – 8 September 1918), was a German Catholic priest and the founder of the Society of the Divine Savior, commonly called the Salvatorians. He was beatified by Pope Francis on May 15, 2021.

== Life ==
He was born John Baptist Jordan in the town of Gurtweil, in the Grand Duchy of Baden (now part of the city of Waldshut-Tiengen, Germany), the second son of Lorenz Jordan and Notburga Peter. Although he felt called to serve as a priest as an early age, the poverty of the family did not allow him to do the required studies. Instead he became an itinerant laborer and painter.

Through his travels throughout Germany, he became aware of the effects of the German government's official policies restricting the activities of the Catholic Church, known as the Kulturkampf, which was resulting in the loss of many of the faithful.

Finally spurred by the situation, Jordan gave up his work and began the academic studies required for holy orders. He initially had private lessons from local clergy and then attended a secondary school in Constance. Despite his struggle with the sciences, he developed a talent for foreign languages. For his graduation examination, he presented one essay in eight European languages and another one in four other languages. Having successfully completed his initial studies, he then proceeded to enroll at the Albert-Ludwigs University in Freiburg to do his higher studies in the fields of theology and philology. After receiving his degree from the university, he enrolled in the nearby St. Peter Seminary.

=== Priest and founder ===
On 21 July 1878, he was ordained a priest for the Roman Catholic Archdiocese of Freiburg. He was then sent by the archbishop to Rome to study Greek and Semitic languages.

During this period, he had a growing conviction that he was being called by God to found a new apostolic work in the Catholic Church, which had as its goal the unification of groups of priests and laity in spreading and defending the Catholic faith throughout the world. This conviction became even stronger during a trip to the Middle East in 1880.

After returning to Rome, Jordan started implementing his idea of founding a community of members under religious vows and laypeople. This would be organized into three groups, called "grades”: the first would be those who committed to leaving everything and, living in community, devote their whole lives to the mission of the organization; the second was to be for academics, who spread the faith by publications; and the third for those lay people who, remaining in their families and within the reality of their everyday life, would proclaim the Savior through the witness of a good Christian life.

On 8 December 1881 in Rome, he founded a community of the first format, initially called the Apostolic Teaching Society, soon called the Catholic Teaching Society, at that time taking the religious name by which he is now known.

==== Salvatorian Sisters ====
That following April, an advertisement for the new society was answered by Baroness Maria Therese von Wüllenweber (1833-1907), an aristocratic young woman who had long felt a call to serve in the mission life which had been unfilled by the religious congregations she had explored. Jordan visited her in July 1882 and she committed herself to the life of the new society, becoming its first female member.

Jordan established a community of religious sisters of the Salvatorians in Rome in 1883 under the leadership of Franziska Streitel, but had Wüllenweber remain in Germany. Problems arose, however, between Jordan and this community and these sisters separated from the society, going on to become the Sisters of the Sorrowful Mother, an international religious congregation, particularly committed to health care.

In 1888 Jordan asked Wüllenweber to move to Rome, where she and two companions took religious vows on 8 December of that year, receiving the religious habit from Jordan. She then became known as Mary of the Apostles. Wüllenweber was beatified on October 13, 1968, and her liturgical commemoration is celebrated on September 5 (the day she professed her vows as the first female member of the Apostolic Teaching Society).

=== Expansion ===
While communities of the Catholic Teaching Society were being established throughout Europe, in 1890 the Holy See entrusted the region of Assam in British India to the spiritual care of the society. Jordan then established the first community of priests and religious brothers of the society outside of Europe. Wüllenweber sent sisters to work with the women and children of the new Indian mission the following year.

In 1892 Jordan accepted the request of Ambrose Oschwald, a priest from Baden, who had led a group of people from that region to Wisconsin, in the United States, in order to form a Christian communal way of life. The Salvatorians then became established in that country, founding the former John F. Kennedy Preparatory High School from the group's property. In 1893, he gave his religious communities the names Society of the Divine Savior and Congregation of the Sisters of the Divine Savior. They were soon known as "Salvatorians" from the Latin salvator ("savior").

=== Death ===
Due to the outbreak of World War I, and the restrictions it imposed on the communications of the society, its administration was moved to Tafers, Switzerland, a neutral nation. Jordan died there on 8 September 1918.

== Veneration ==
In 1942 the process for Jordan's beatification was introduced to the Holy See. As part of this process, in 1956 his body was exhumed, examined and transferred to the Salvatorian motherhouse in Rome. On 14 January 2011, Pope Benedict XVI authorized the Congregation for the Causes of Saints to publish the decree on the heroicity of his virtues, granting him the title of Venerable.

On 19 June 2020, Pope Francis approved Jordan's beatification and decreed the validity of a miracle gained through the intercession of Jordan – in 2014 in Jundiai, Brazil, a yet-to-be-born child, whose parents were members of a group of Lay Salvatorians, prayed through Jordan's intercession for the health of their child, who was expected to be born with serious skeletal deformities, according to the testings and the doctors. The parents asked the Salvatorian community to join them in their prayer. The child was born on 8 September 2014, the Feast of the Birth of the Blessed Mother, and the anniversary of Jordan's death.

The beatification ceremony took place on May 15, 2021 in the Archbasilica of Saint John Lateran with Cardinal Angelo de Donatis as the celebrant and homilist.

== Legacy ==
At present, the Salvatorian priests and brothers number about 1,300 and have a presence in 46 countries around the world, represented on every continent. The Salvatorian Sisters currently number about 1,200 members serving in nearly 30 countries.

In 2001, the Salvatorian Family of the priests, brothers, sisters, and lay members in the United States established a new collaborative ministry based in the (Roman Catholic Diocese of Tucson) named for Francis Jordan called Jordan Ministry Team. This ministry, which was discontinued in 2022, provided initial and ongoing formation permanent deacon and lay ecclesial minsters, as well as catechists, parish staff members, and Catholic school teachers at all levels through their online and in-person programming.

== Notes ==
Catholic Church titles
New office	Superior General of the Society of the Divine Savior; 1881–1915	Succeeded by Pankratius Pfeiffer
