= John Baptist Perrote =

Menominee judge and leader

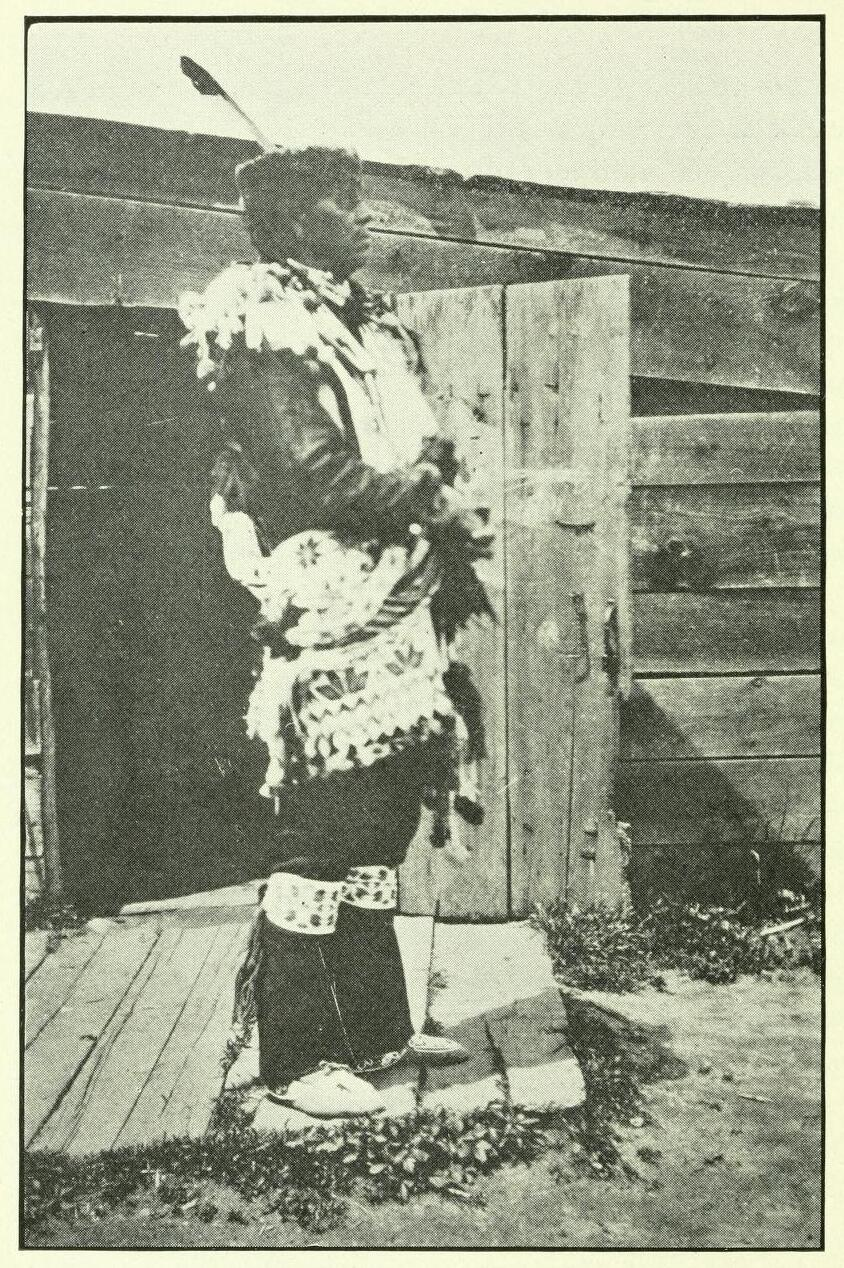
- Undated photo of Perrote wearing traditional clothing
- Born: c. 1840; Near Lake Winnebago
- Died: 1920; Menominee Indian Reservation
- Other names: Sabatis

John Baptist Perrote, or Sabatis, was a Menominee tribal court judge and religious leader.

Perrote was born around 1840 near Lake Winnebago in Wisconsin. His parents came from a Menominee village called Wasûske'’sino near Chilton. He was descended from Nicolas Perrot, a 17th-century French explorer and fur trader.

Perrote lived in the Fond du Lac area until the Menominee were removed to the Menominee Indian Reservation. Perrote was a grandmaster of the Medicine Dance and a leader of the Dream Dance, as well as a judge of the Menominee tribal court. In the early 20th century he developed a close relationship with Alanson B. Skinner, an anthropologist who studied the Menominee in depth. Perrote became a key source of information in Skinner's studies of Menominee culture.

Perrote died of illness on July 10th, 1920 on the Menominee reservation and was buried with the honors of a Medicine Dance grandmaster, Dream Dance leader, and federal judge. The town of Perote, which was later abandoned, was named after him.
