= Menominee =

Federally-recognized indigenous people of the United States

omāēqnomenēwak
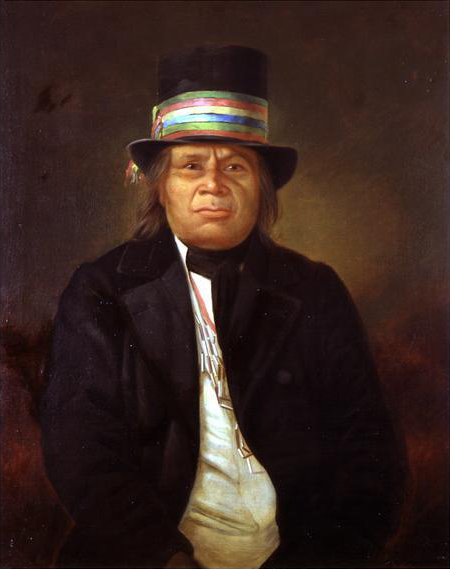
- Chief Oshkosh, c. 1858

Total population
- 8,700

Regions with significant populations
- Wisconsin, United States; Menominee Indian Reservation

Languages
- English, Menominee

Religion
- Catholic, Big Drum, Native American Church

Related ethnic groups
- Potawatomi, Ojibwe, Kickapoo, Noquet (†)

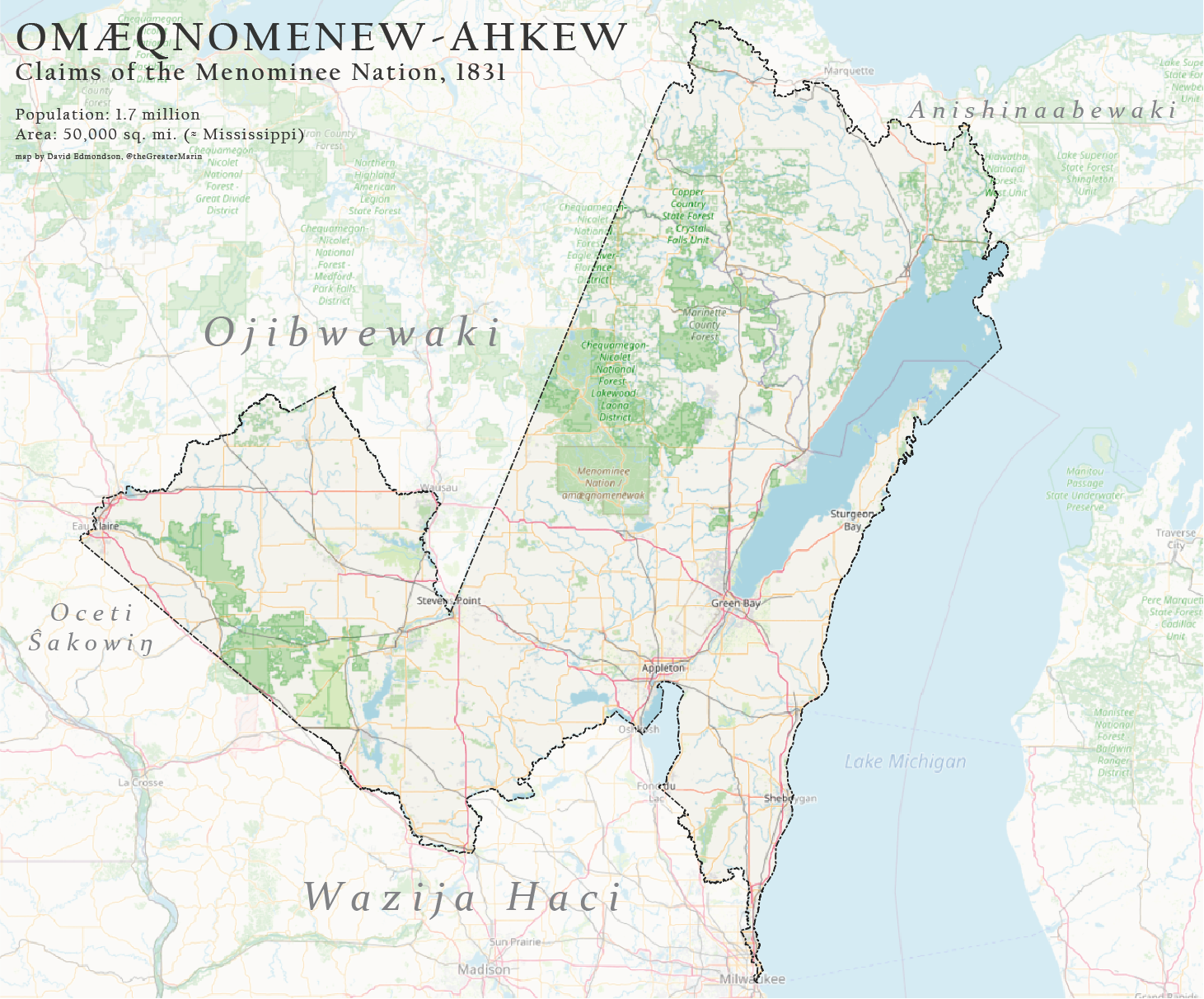
Claims of the Menominee Nation as described in the Treaty of Washington of 1831. The map's title text, Omaeqnomenew-ahkew, means "Land of the Wild Rice People" in the Menominee language.

The Menominee (/məˈnɒmɪni/ mə-NOM-in-ee; Menominee: omāēqnomenēwak, IPA: [omæːʔnomeneːwak] meaning "Menominee People", also spelled Menomini, derived from the Ojibwe language word for "Wild Rice People"; known as Mamaceqtaw, IPA: [mamat͡ʃeʔtaw] "the people", in the Menominee language) are a federally recognized tribe of Native Americans officially known as the Menominee Indian Tribe of Wisconsin. Their land base is the Menominee Indian Reservation in Wisconsin. Their historic territory originally included an estimated 10 million acres (40,000 km^{2}) in present-day Wisconsin and the Upper Peninsula of Michigan. The tribe currently has about 8,700 members.

Federal recognition of the tribe was terminated in the 1960s under policy of the time which stressed assimilation. During that period, they brought what has become a landmark case in Indian law to the United States Supreme Court, in Menominee Tribe v. United States (1968), to protect their treaty hunting and fishing rights. The Wisconsin Supreme Court and the United States Court of Claims had drawn opposing conclusions about the effect of the termination on Menominee hunting and fishing rights on their former reservation land. The U.S. Supreme Court determined that the tribe had not lost traditional hunting and fishing rights as a result of termination, as Congress had not clearly ended these in its legislation.

The tribe regained federal recognition in 1973 by an act of Congress, re-establishing its reservation in 1975. It operates under a written constitution establishing an elected government. The tribe took over tribal government and administration from the Bureau of Indian Affairs (BIA) in 1979.

== Overview ==
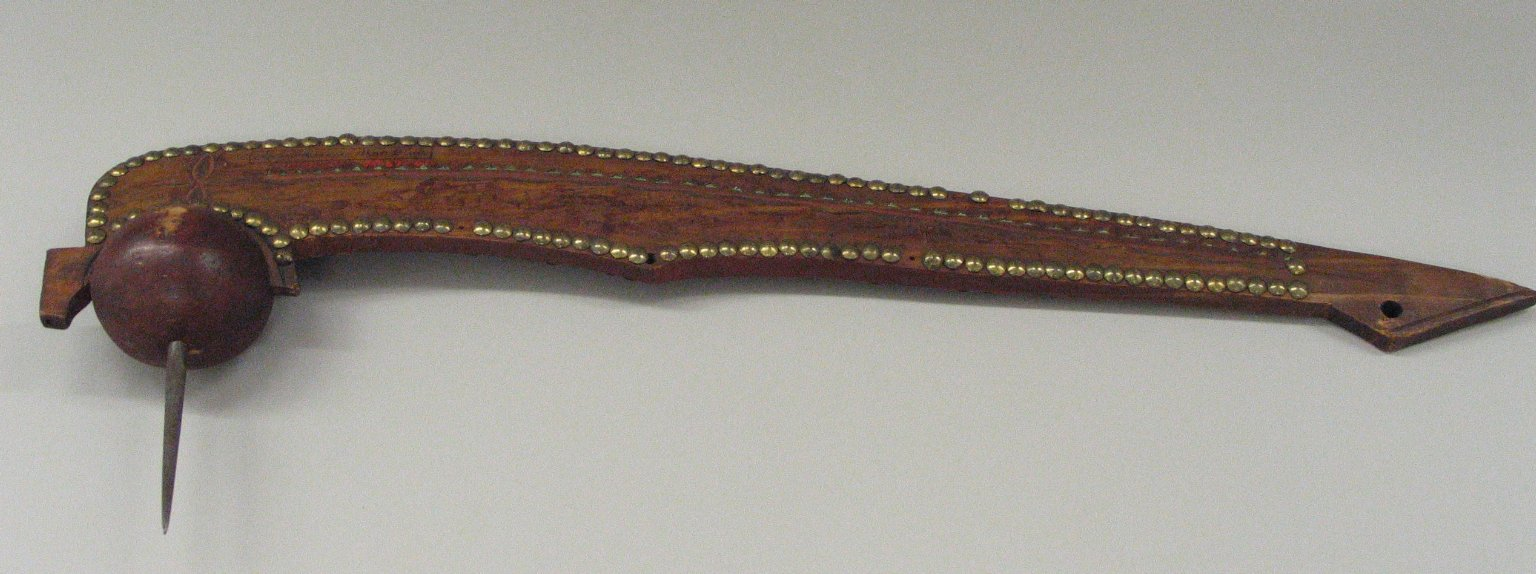
Ball-headed War Club with Spike, Menominee, early 19th century, Brooklyn Museum

The Menominee are part of the Algonquian language family of North America, made up of several tribes now located around the Great Lakes and many other tribes based along the Atlantic coast. They are one of the historical tribes of present-day upper Michigan and Wisconsin; they occupied a territory of about 10 million acres (40,000 km^{2}) in the period of European colonization. They are believed to have been well-settled in that territory for more than 1,000 years. By some accounts, they are descended from the Old Copper Culture people and other indigenous peoples who had been in this area for 10,000 years.

Menominee oral history states that they have always been here and believe they are Kiash Matchitiwuk (pronounced 'kee ahsh mah che te wuck'), which is "Ancient Ones". Their reservation is located 60 miles west of the site of their Creation, according to their tradition. They arose where the Menominee River enters Green Bay of Lake Michigan, where the city of Marinette, Wisconsin, has since developed.

Their name for themselves is Mamaceqtaw (IPA: [mamat͡ʃeʔtaw]), meaning "the people". The name "Menominee" is not their autonym. It was adopted by Europeans from the Ojibwe people, another Algonquian tribe whom they encountered first as they moved west and who told them of the Menominee. The Ojibwe name for the tribe was manoominii, meaning "wild rice people", as they cultivated wild rice (Menominee: manōmen) as one of their most important food staples.

Historically, the Menominee were known to be a peaceful, friendly and welcoming nation, who had a reputation for getting along with other tribes. When the Oneota culture arose in southern Wisconsin between AD 800 and 900, the Menominee shared the forests and waters with them.

The Menominee are a Northeastern Woodlands tribe. They were initially encountered by European explorers in Wisconsin in the mid-17th century during the colonial era, and had extended interaction with them during later periods in North America. During this period they lived in numerous villages which the French visited for fur trading. The anthropologist James Mooney in 1928 estimated that the tribe's number in 1650 was 3,000 persons.

The early French explorers and traders referred to the people as "folles avoines" (wild oats), referring to the wild rice which they cultivated and gathered as one of their staple foods. The Menominee have traditionally subsisted on a wide variety of plants and animals, with wild rice and sturgeon (namāēw) being two of the most important. Wild rice has a special importance to the tribe as their staple grain, while the sturgeon has a mythological importance and is often referred to as the "father" of the Menominee. Feasts are still held annually at which each of these is served.

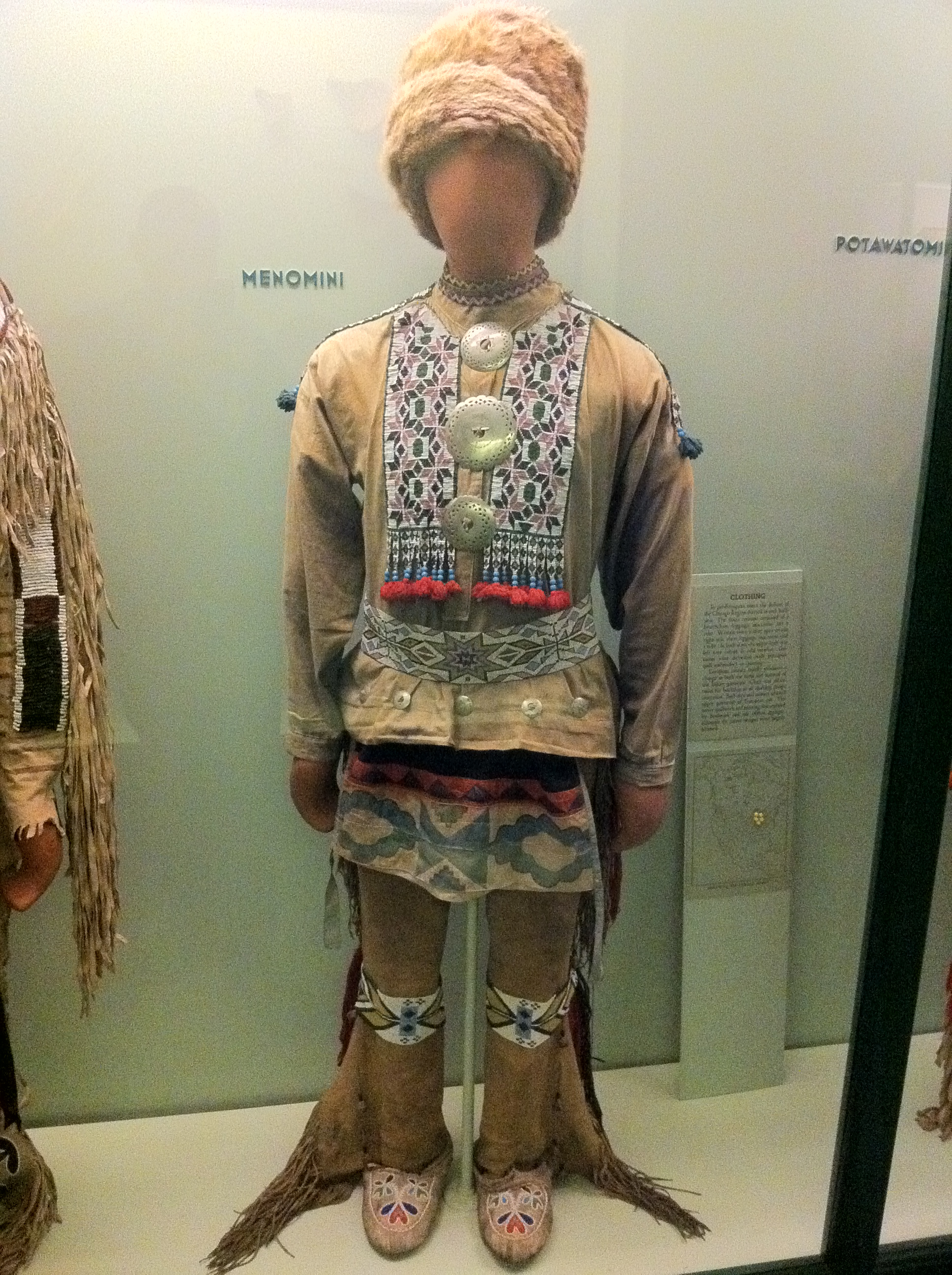
Menomini dress at the Field Museum in Chicago

Menominee customs are quite similar to those of the Ojibwe (Chippewa), another Algonquian people. Their language has a closer affinity to those of the Meskwaki and Kickapoo tribes. All four spoke Anishinaabe languages, part of the Algonquian family.

The five principal Menominee clans are the Bear (Awāēhsaeh), the Eagle (Kenēw), the Wolf (Mahwāēw), the Crane (Otāēqciah), and the Moose (Mōs). Each has traditional responsibilities within the tribe. With a patrilineal kinship system, traditional Menominee believe that children derive their social status from their fathers, and are born "into" their father's clan. Members of the same clan are considered relatives, so must choose marriage partners from outside their clan. Ethnologist James Mooney wrote an article on the Menominee which appeared in Catholic Encyclopedia (1913), incorrectly reporting that their descent and inheritance proceeds through the female line. Such a matrilineal kinship system is common among many other Native American peoples, including other Algonquian tribes.

== Culture ==
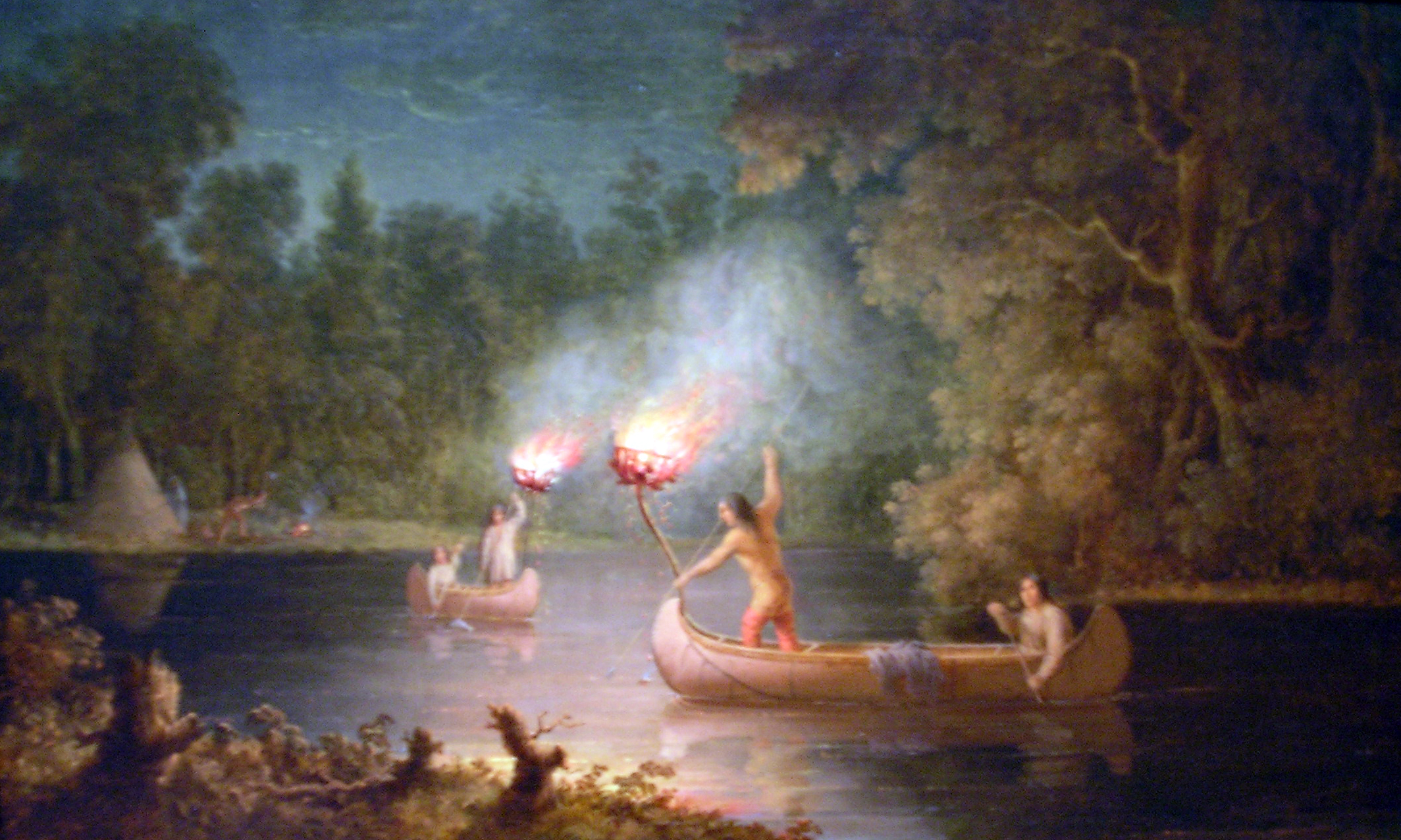
Spearing Salmon By Torchlight, an oil painting by Paul Kane. It features Menominee spearfishing at night by torchlight and canoe on the Fox River.

Traditional Menominee spiritual culture includes rites of passage for youth at puberty. Ceremonies involve fasting for multiple days and living in a small isolated wigwam. As part of this transition, youth meet individually with Elders for interpretation of their dreams, and to receive information about what adult responsibilities they will begin to take on following their rites of passage.

=== Ethnobotany ===
Traditional Menominee diets include local foods such as Allium tricoccum (pekuac-sekākūhsyah, ramps, or wild garlic). Boiled, sliced potatoes of Sagittaria cuneata (wāhpesohpāēnyak) are traditionally strung together and dried for winter use. Uvularia grandiflora (bellwort) has historically been used to treat pain and swellings. Pseudognaphalium obtusifolium ssp. obtusifolium (rabbit tobacco) is also used medicinally. Taenidia integerrima (manīkōhsaeh, a member of the parsely family) is taken as a root infusion for pulmonary troubles, and as chew, the steeped root, for 'bronchial affections'; it is also used as a companion herb in other remedies because of its pleasant smell. The inner bark of Abies balsamea (ōkekāhtek) is used as a seasoner for medicines, taking an infusion of the inner bark for chest pain and using the liquid balsam pressed from the trunk for colds and pulmonary troubles. The inner bark is used as a poultice for unspecified illnesses. Gum from plant blisters is also applied to sores.

== History ==
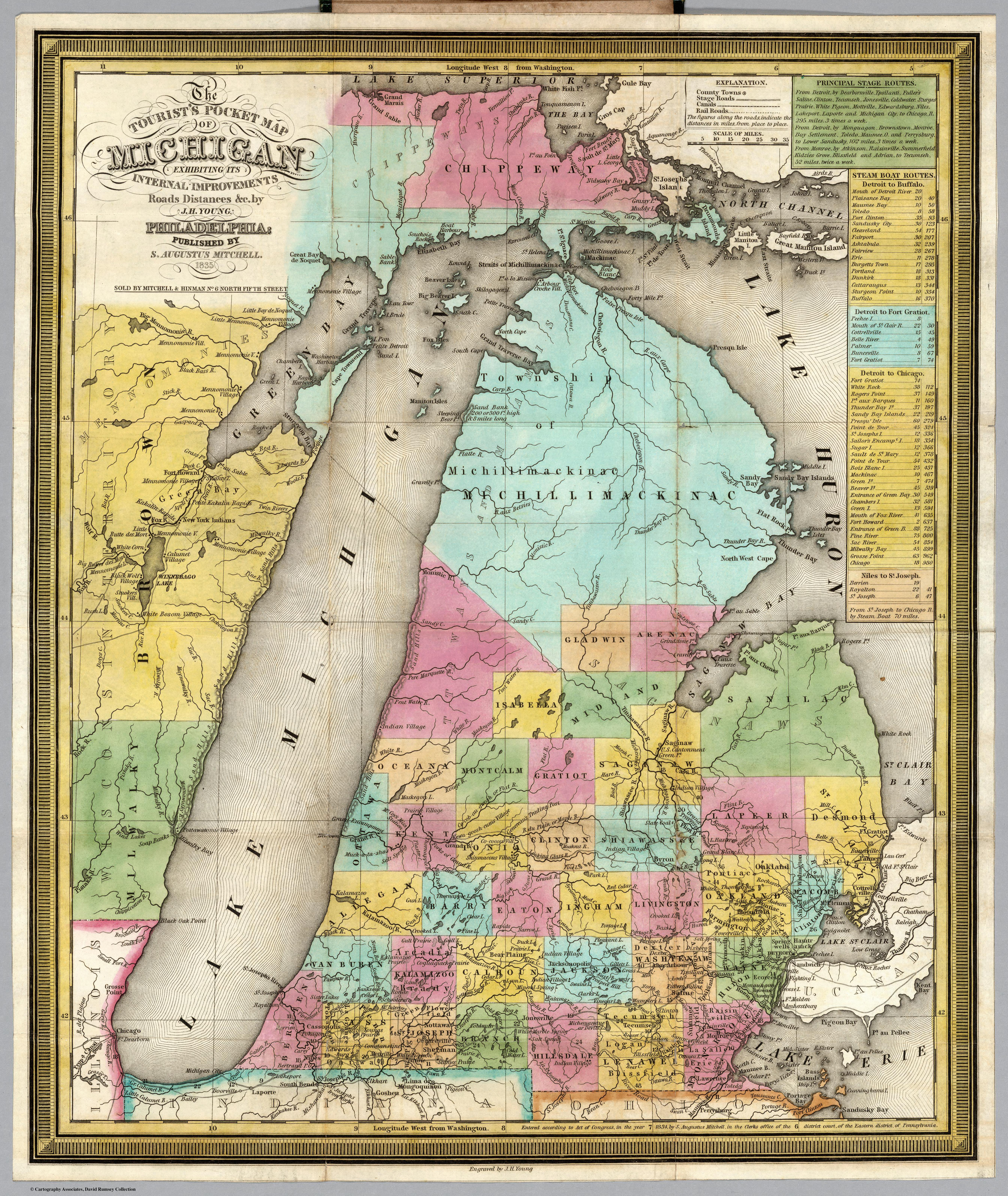
Wisconsin Territory depicted on this 1835 Tourist's Pocket Map Of Michigan, showing a Menominee-filled Brown County, Wisconsin, that spans the northern half of the territory

The tribe originally occupied a large territory of 10 million acres (40,000 km^{2}) extending from Wisconsin to the Upper Peninsula of Michigan. Historic references include one by Father Frederic Baraga, a missionary priest in Michigan, who in his 1878 dictionary wrote:

Mishinimakinago; pl.-g.—This name is given to some strange Indians (according to the sayings of the Otchipwes [Ojibwe]), who are rowing through the woods, and who are sometimes heard shooting, but never seen. And from this word, the name of the village of Mackinac, or Michillimackinac, is derived.

Maehkaenah is the Menominee word for turtle. In his The Indian Tribes of North America (1952), John Reed Swanton recorded under the "Wisconsin" section: "Menominee," a band named "Misi'nimäk Kimiko Wini'niwuk, 'Michilimackinac People,' near the old fort at Mackinac, Mich." Michillimackinac is also spelled as Mishinimakinago, Mǐshǐma‛kǐnung, Mi-shi-ne-macki naw-go, Missilimakinak, Teiodondoraghie.

The Menominee are descendants of the Late Woodland Indians who inhabited the lands once occupied by Hopewell Indians, the earliest human inhabitants of the Lake Michigan region. As the Hopewell culture declined, circa A.D. 800, the Lake Michigan region eventually became home to Late Woodland Indians.

Early fur traders, coureur-de-bois, and explorers from France encountered their descendants: the Menominee, Ojibwe, Odawa, Potawatomi, Sauk, Meskwaki, Ho-Chunk and Miami. It is believed that the French explorer Jean Nicolet was the first non-Native American to reach Lake Michigan in 1634 or 1638.

=== First European encounter ===
Menominee signature on Great Peace of Montreal in 1701 depicting a thunderbird holding a wild oat stem

In 1634, the Menominee, Ho-Chunk, and Noquet (along with a band of Potawatomi who had recently moved into Wisconsin) witnessed the French explorer Jean Nicolet's approach and landing. Red Banks, near the present-day city of Green Bay, Wisconsin, later developed in this area. Nicolet, looking for a Northwest Passage to China, hoped to find and impress the Chinese. As the canoe approached the shore, Nicolet put on a silk Chinese ceremonial robe, stood up in the middle of the canoe and shot off two pistols, a moment later immortalized in a famous painting of the explorer.

Pierre François Xavier de Charlevoix, a French Catholic clergyman, professor, historian, author and explorer, kept a detailed journal of his travels through Wisconsin and Louisiana. In 1721 he came upon the Menominee, whom he referred to as Malhomines ("peuples d'avoines" or Wild Oat Indians), which the French had adapted from an Ojibwe term:

After we had advanced five or six leagues, we found ourselves abreast of a little island, which lies near the western side of the bay, and which concealed from our view, the mouth of a river, on which stands the village of the Malhomines Indians, called by our French "peuples d'avoines" or Wild Oat Indians, probably from their living chiefly on this sort of grain. The whole nation consists only of this village, and that too not very numerous. 'Tis really great pity, they being the finest and handsomest men in all Canada. They are even of a larger stature than the Potawatomi. I have been assured that they had the same original and nearly the same languages with the Noquets, and the Indians at the Falls.

=== 19th century ===
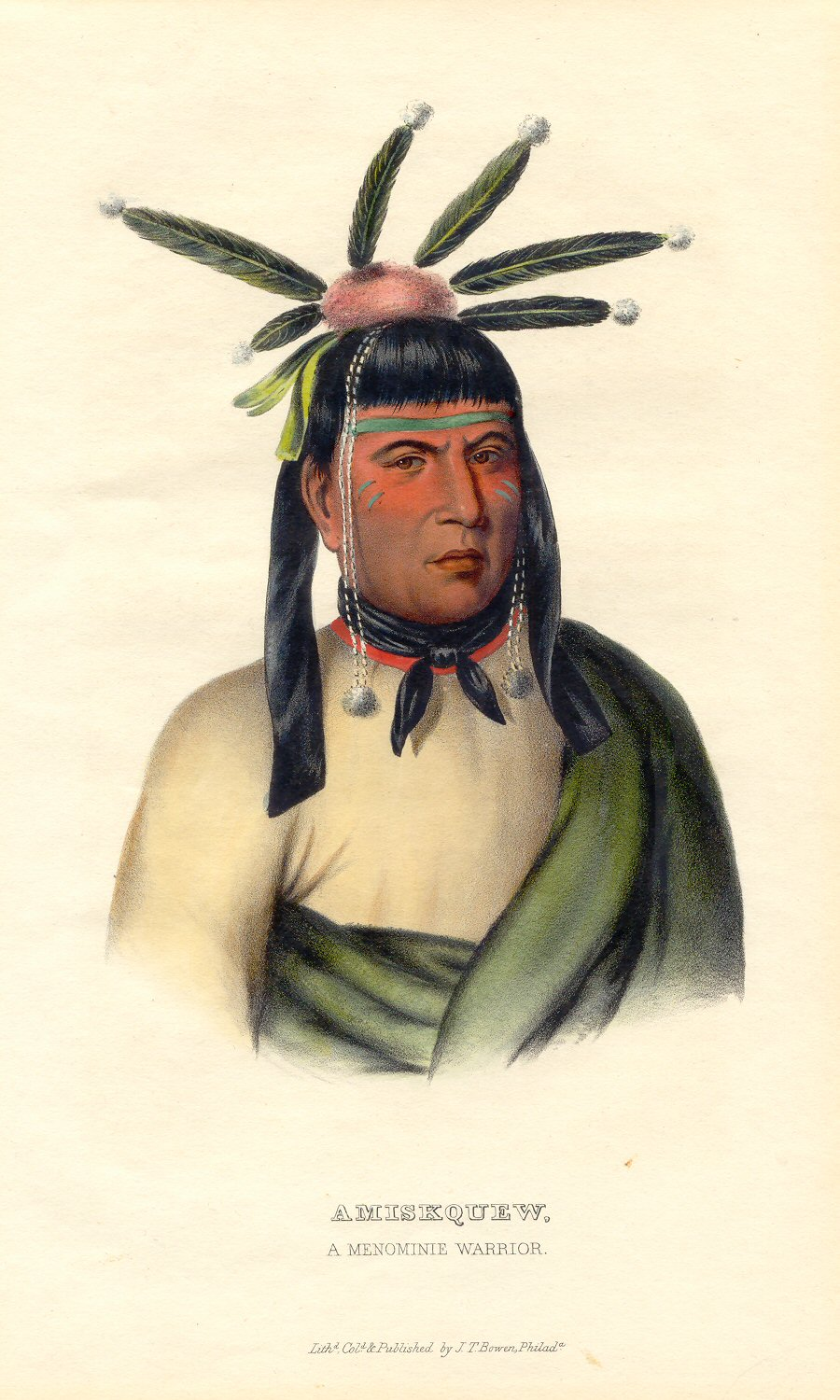
Amiskquew, a mid-19th century Menominee warrior, from History of the Indian Tribes of North America

Initially neutral during the War of 1812, the Menominee later became allied with the British and Canadians, whom they helped defeat American forces trying to recapture Fort Mackinac in the Battle of Mackinac Island. During the ensuing decades, the Menominee were pressured by encroachment of new European-American settlers in the area. Settlers first arrived in Michigan, where lumbering on the Upper Peninsula and resource extraction attracted workers. By mid-century, encroachment by new settlers was increasing. In the 1820s, the Menominee were approached by representatives of the Christianized Stockbridge-Munsee Indians from New York to share or cede some of their land for their use.

The Menominee gradually sold much of their lands in Michigan and Wisconsin to the U.S. government through seven treaties from 1821 to 1848, first ceding their lands in Michigan. The US government wanted to move them to the far west in the period when Wisconsin was organizing for statehood, to extinguish all Native American land claims. Chief Oshkosh went to look at the proposed site on the Crow River and rejected the offered land, saying their current land was better for hunting and game. The Menominee retained lands near the Wolf River in what became their current reservation. The tribe originated in the Wisconsin and are living in their traditional homelands.

=== Modern-era conflicts ===
==== Logging ====
The Menominee have traditionally practiced logging in a sustainable manner. In 1905, a tornado swept through the reservation, downing a massive amount of timber. Because the Menominee-owned sawmills could not harvest all the downed timber before it decomposed, the United States Forest Service became involved in managing their forest. Despite the desire of the tribe and Senator Robert M. La Follette, Sr. for sustainable yield policy, the Forest Service conducted clear-cutting on reservation lands until 1926, cutting 70 percent of the salable timber.

The Department of the Interior regained control of the territory, as it holds the reservation in trust for the Menominee. During the next dozen years, it reduced the cutting of salable timber to 30 percent, which allowed the forest to regenerate. In 1934, the Menominee filed suit in the United States Court of Claims against the Forest Service, saying that its policy had heavily damaged their resource. The court agreed and settled the claim finally in 1952, awarding the Menominee $8.5 million.

==== 20th-century termination era ====
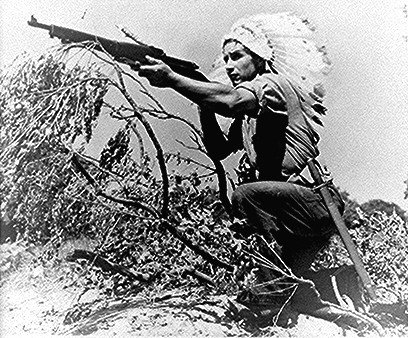
Dan Waupoose, a Menomini chief; training at Algiers, Louisiana, during World War II. U.S. Navy photograph, August 24, 1943.

The Menominee were among the Native Americans who participated as soldiers in World War II with other United States citizens.

During the 1950s, federal Indian policy envisioned termination of the "special relationship" between the United States government and those tribes considered "ready for assimilation" to mainstream culture. The Menominee were identified for termination, which would end their status as a sovereign nation. At the time, the Klamath people in Oregon were the only other tribal group identified for termination. The Bureau of Indian Affairs (BIA) believed the Menominee were sufficiently economically self-reliant on their timber industry to be successful independent of federal assistance and oversight. Before termination, they were one of the wealthiest American Indian tribes.

In 1954, Congress passed a law which phased out the Menominee reservation, effectively terminating its tribal status on April 30, 1961. Commonly held tribal property was transferred to a corporation, Menominee Enterprises, Inc. (MEI). It had a complicated structure and two trusts, one of which, First Wisconsin Trust Company, was appointed by the BIA. First Wisconsin Trust Company always voted its shares as a block, and essentially could control the management operations of MEI.

At the request of the Menominee, the state organized the former reservation as a new county, so they could maintain some coherence. The tribe was expected to provide county government functions but it became a colony of the state.

The change resulted in diminished standards of living for the members of the tribe; officials had to close the hospital and some schools in order to cover costs of the conversion: to provide their own services or contract for them as a county. Menominee County was the poorest and least populated Wisconsin county during this time, and termination adversely affected the region. Tribal crafts and produce alone could not sustain the community. As the tax base lacked industry, the Menominee could not fund basic services. MEI funds, which totaled $10 million in 1954, dwindled to $300,000 by 1964. Struggling to manage financially, the white-dominated MEI proposed in 1967 to raise money by selling off former tribal lands to non-Native Americans, which resulted in a fierce backlash among the Menominee.

It was a period of Indian activism, and community members began an organizing campaign to regain political sovereignty as the Menominee Tribe. Activists included Ada Deer, an organizer who would later become an advocate for Native Americans at the federal level as Assistant Secretary of Indian Affairs (1993–1997). In 1970 the activists formed a group called the Determination of Rights and Unity for Menominee Stockholders (DRUMS). They blocked the proposed sale of tribal land by MEI to non-Indian developers, and successfully gained control of the MEI board of directors. They also persuaded Congress to restore their status as a federally recognized sovereign tribe by legislation.

At the same time, President Richard Nixon encouraged a federal policy to increase self-government among Indian tribes, in addition to increasing education opportunities and religious protection. He signed the bill for federal recognition of the Menominee Tribe of Wisconsin on December 22, 1973. The sovereign tribe started the work of reorganizing the reservation, which they re-established in 1975. Tribal members wrote and ratified a tribal constitution in 1976, and elected a new tribal government, which took over from BIA officials in 1979.

==== Menominee Tribe v. United States (1968) ====
During the period of termination, when the Menominee individually were subject to state law, in 1963 three members of the tribe were charged with violating Wisconsin's hunting and fishing laws on what had formerly been their reservation land for more than 100 years. The tribal members were acquitted. When the state appealed the decision, the Wisconsin Supreme Court held that the Menominee tribe no longer had hunting and fishing rights due to the termination act of Congress in 1954.

Due to the state court's ruling, the tribe sued the United States for compensation for the value of the hunting and fishing rights in the U.S. Court of Claims, in Menominee Tribe v. United States (1968). The Court ruled that tribal members still had hunting and fishing rights, and that Congress had not abrogated those rights. The opposite rulings by the state and federal courts brought the issue to the United States Supreme Court.

In 1968 the Supreme Court held that the tribe retained its hunting and fishing rights under the treaties involved, and the rights were not lost after federal recognition was ended by the Menominee Termination Act, as Congress had not clearly removed those rights in its legislation. This has been a landmark case in Indian law, helping preserve Native American hunting and fishing rights.

==== Anaem Omot ====
The site Anaem Omot along the banks of the Menominee River is considered the sacred home of the Menominee Nation, with artifacts there dating as far back as 8,000 B.C. For a 600-year period from A.D. 1000 to 1600, the site was intensively farmed and has been a special area of study by archaeologists as the most intact pre-European farming site in eastern North America. In 2015, an open pit gold mine was proposed that would impact the site, and the Menominee and their supporters have been fighting to stop the mine construction. In June 2023, the National Park Service added the site to the National Register of Historic Places following a contentious multi-year nomination process that was supported by both states of Michigan and Wisconsin; it was opposed by the gold company and some local Upper Peninsula lawmakers. Although the NRHP listing affords "zero protection" to the land, it is a stepping stone towards applying for a higher level of land conservation that would offer legal protections.

=== Current tribal activities ===
The nation has a notable forestry resource and manages a timber program. In an 1870 assessment of their lands, which totaled roughly 235,000 acres (950 km^{2}), they counted 1.3 billion standing board feet (3.1 million cubic metres) of timber. As of 2002 that has increased to 1.7 billion board feet (4.0 million m^{3}). In the intervening years, they have harvested more than 2.25 billion board feet (5.3 million m^{3}). In 1994, the Menominee became the first forest management enterprise in the United States certified by the Forest Stewardship Council (FSC.org).

Since June 5, 1987, the tribe has owned and operated a Las Vegas-style gaming casino, associated with bingo games and a hotel. The complex provides employment to numerous Menominee; approximately 79 percent of the Menominee Casino-Bingo-Hotel's 500 employees are ethnic Menominee or are spouses of Menominee.

== Menominee Indian Reservation ==
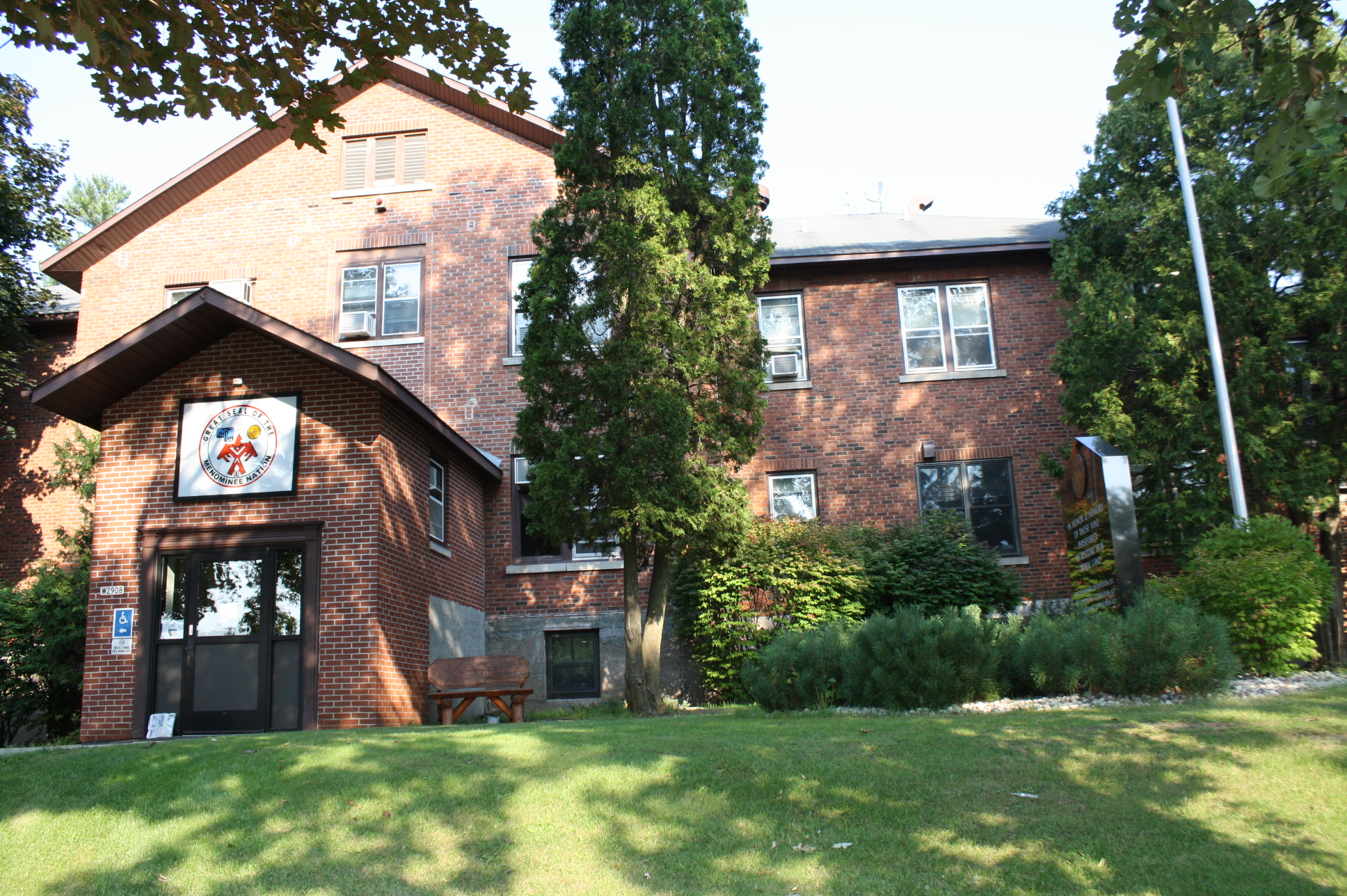
Tribal office in Keshena

The Menominee Indian Reservation is located in northeastern Wisconsin. For the most part, it is conterminous with Menominee County and the town of Menominee, which were established after termination of the tribe in 1961 under contemporary federal policy whose goal was assimilation. The tribe regained its federally recognized status and reservation in 1975.

The reservation was created in a treaty with the United States signed on May 12, 1854, in which the Menominee relinquished all claims to the lands held by them under previous treaties, and were assigned 432 square miles (1,120 km^{2}) on the Wolf River in present-day Wisconsin. An additional treaty, which they signed on February 11, 1856, carved out the southwestern corner of this area to create a separate reservation for the Stockbridge and Lenape (Munsee) tribes, who had reached the area as refugees from New York state. The latter two tribes have the federally recognized joint Stockbridge-Munsee Community.

After the tribe had regained federal recognition in 1973, it essentially restored the reservation to its historic boundaries in 1975. Many small pockets of territory within the county (and its geographically equivalent town) are not considered as part of the reservation. These amount to 1.14% of the county's area, so the reservation is essentially 98.86% of the county's area. The largest of these pockets is in the western part of the community of Keshena, Wisconsin. According to the U.S. Census Bureau, the combined Menominee reservation and off-reservation trust land have a total area of 362.8 square miles (939.6 km^{2}), of which 355.5 square miles (920.7 km^{2}) is land and 7.3 square miles (18.9 km^{2}) is water.

The small non-reservation parts of the county are more densely populated than the reservation, with 1,223 (28.7%) of the county's 4,255 total population, as opposed to the reservation's 3,032 (71.3%) population in the 2020 census.

The most populous communities are Legend Lake and Keshena. Since the late 20th century, the members of the reservation have operated a number of gambling facilities in these communities as a source of revenue. They speak English as well as their traditional Menominee language, one of the Algonquian languages. Current population of the tribe is about 8,700.

=== Communities ===
- Keshena (most, population 1,268)
- Legend Lake (most, population 1,525)
- Middle Village (part, population 281)
- Neopit (most, population 690)
- Zoar (most, population 98)

== Government ==
The tribe operates according to a written constitution. It elects a tribal council and chairman.

The Menominee developed the College of Menominee Nation in 1993 and it was accredited in 1998. It includes a Sustainable Development Institute. Its goal is education to promote their ethic for living in balance on the land. It is one of a number of tribal colleges and universities that have been developed since the early 1970s, and one of two in Wisconsin.

== Notable Menominee ==
- Apesanahkwat, actor who starred in Babylon 5 and films
- Alaqua Cox (born February 13, 1997), actress, Hawkeye and Echo
- Ada Deer, activist and Assistant Secretary for Indian Affairs, 1993–1997
- Billie Frechette, lover of 1930s serial bank robber John Dillinger
- Mitchell Oshkenaniew, advocate for sovereignty and recognition by federal government
- Chief Oshkosh (1795–1858), chief of Menominee during period of land cessions and restriction to reservation within Wisconsin
- Sheila Tousey, actress, Thunderheart (1992)
- Ingrid Washinawatok, co-founder of the Fund for the Four Directions, Indigenous activist; killed in 1999 in Colombia by the Revolutionary Armed Forces of Colombia
