= Perote =

Perote may refer to:

== Places ==
Mexico

- Perote, Veracruz

United States

- Perote, Alabama
- Perote, Wisconsin, a ghost town
