= Dream Dance =

Native American dance and religious movement

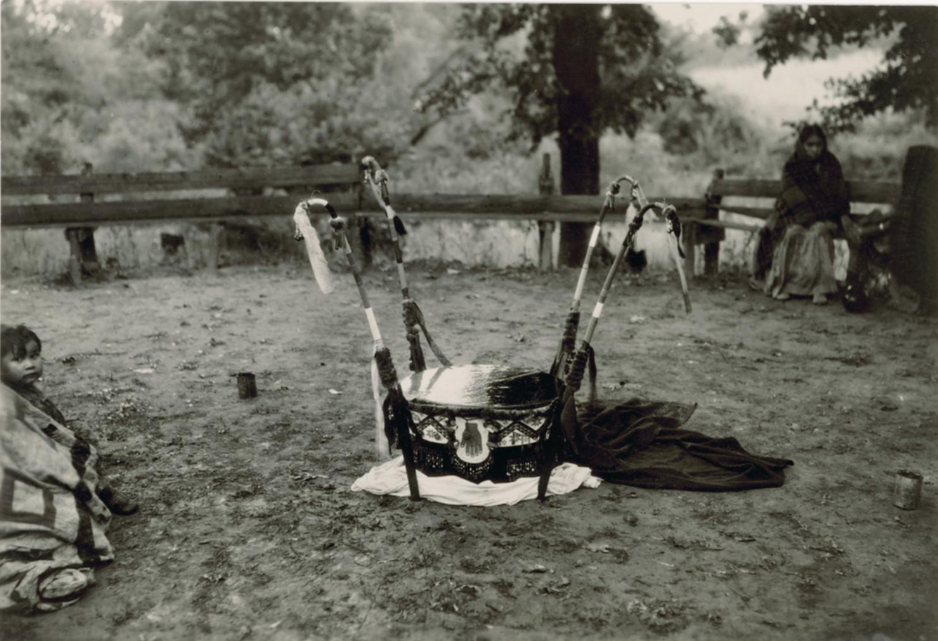
An Iowa Sac and Fox Dream Dance drum, 1923

The Dream Dance, sometimes also called the Drum Dance or Big Drum, is a ceremonial drum dance and religious movement practiced by some Native American tribes of the Great Plains and Upper Midwest, particularly the Menominee, Ojibwe, and Potawatomi. Founded around the 1870s among the Sioux of Minnesota, the Dream Dance originates with the vision of a Dakota woman known as Turkey Tailfeather Woman. It is focused around a large ritual drum and a set of ceremonies prescribed by Tailfeather Woman. By the late 20th century, the Dream Dance was moribund in most places it had been practiced, but it has seen a revival in the 21st century.

== Names ==
The Dream Dance is known as Bwaaniniimi'idiwin (lit. 'Sioux dance') in the Ojibwe language, and Nemeheetwin (lit. 'dancing rite') in Menominee. Other English names include "Drum Dance", "Drum Religion", "Drum Society", "Drum Lodge", "Society of Dancing Men", "Drum Faith", "Peace Dance" (among the Menominee), "Drum Cult", "Religion Dance", "Society of Dreamers", "Sioux Dance", and simply "Powwow".

== History ==
Drums form a central component of North American indigenous peoples' ceremonies, including those of the Ojibwe. Traditionally, Ojibwe drum dances involved a line of men playing small hand-drums and singing in unison.

=== Origin ===
According to oral tradition, Tailfeather Woman of the Minnesota Dakota had a vision which instructed her how to bring peace to her tribe which was at war with the United States government. The vision prescribed a set of dances and songs to be performed in a special pavilion with a large drum in the center, which would be introduced to other tribes as an instrument of peace between Natives. According to ethnomusicologist Thomas Vennum, this event likely happened in west-central Minnesota in the 1870s. The precise details of Tailfeather Woman's story vary.

The true origin of the Dream Dance has been the subject of some academic controversy. The prevailing view among scholars is that it originated between 1860 and 1890 among the Sioux of Minnesota, although others have postulated an origin with the Wisconsin Ojibwe or Kansas Potawatomi. (Note: In his memoirs, Benjamin G. Armstrong claimed the visionary had brought the Drum to the Ojibwe of Wisconsin, and that he had met her near Ashland. In the 1920s, linguist Truman Michelson argued for the historicity of the Tailfeather Woman origin, while anthropologist Alanson B. Skinner argued for an earlier origin with the Kansas Potawatomi, based on personal communication with Menominee informants.)

=== Adoption by the Ojibwe and other tribes ===
In the years following the original vision of Tailfeather Woman, the Dream Dance was adopted by various tribes in the Midwest including the Ojibwe, Menominee, Potawatomi, and Ho-Chunk, each of whom modified it slightly. The Dream Dance spread from the Minnesota Sioux to the White Earth Ojibwe, and from there to the tribes of Wisconsin. From Wisconsin, it spread to Iowa, Kansas, Oklahoma, and then to Manitoba.

Scholar Christopher Vecsey attributes in part the adoption of the Dream Dance by the Ojibwe to Tailfeather Woman's vision coinciding with existing Ojibwe religious beliefs about manitous and spiritual visions. In the early 20th century, as the Midewiwin declined, the Dream Dance became more medicinally focused as a result. Competition between religious associations such as Midewiwin, Peyotism, and the Dream Dance deepened divisions and rivalries between Ojibwe chiefs.

Among the Menominee, the Dream Dance arrived around 1880. In 1881, a delegation of Ojibwe and Potawatomi presented the Menominee with a ceremonial "Grandfather" Drum and taught the locals the Dream Dance tenets and rituals. This was opposed by the Catholic authorities on the reservation, and lead to social tensions between Catholic Menominee and those who adhered to the Midewiwin and Dream Dance. Many of those who refused to convert to Christianity or drop their traditional practices retreated to the more remote parts of the reservation. Some Menominee saw the Dream Dance as superseding existing traditions, while others integrated it into their existing beliefs (such as Midewiwin).

The Prairie Potawatomi of Kansas were introduced to the Dream Dance in the early 1880s.

By 1966, the tribes which had adopted the Dream Dance (to varying degrees) were the Ojibwe of Minnesota, Wisconsin, the Upper Peninsula of Michigan, and Ontario; the Menominee; the Potawatomi of Forest County, Wisconsin, Kansas, and Oklahoma; the Sauk of Kansas and Oklahoma; the Meskwaki of Iowa; and the Roseau River Plains Ojibwe of Manitoba. Tribes which had previously adopted the Dream Dance but it had died out by 1966 include the Iowa of Nebraska and Oklahoma, the Otoe of Oklahoma, the Absentee Shawnee of Oklahoma, and the Ho-Chunk of Wisconsin and Nebraska. James H. Howard noted that despite its origin, the Dakota never widely adopted the Dream Dance. He also noted an incident where the Kansas Potawatomi ceremonially transferred a Dream Drum to the Osage, who used it in secular powwows. Affronted, the Kansas Potawatomi refused to transfer any more drums to the Osage.

=== Contemporary history ===
As of 1963, the Dream Dance was practiced in the traditionalist-oriented Menominee village of Zoar, Wisconsin. In 1971, George and Louise Spindler noted that it was still prominent among traditionalist Menominee. In 1969 the Dream Dance was described as "easily the most prominent feature of religious life" among the Prairie Potawatomi in Kansas.

By the early 1980s, the Dream Dance had severely declined in Minnesota and Wisconsin, a process which had started in the 1930s. At that time, Dream Dance was still practiced in places which had adopted it later. Vecsey in 1983 characterized Ojibwe practice of the Dream Dance as having "degenerated into a tourist attraction with little religious import." Vecsey also wrote that "today it is in serious decline among the Ojibwas, but it is far from dead as a means for some Ojibwas to communicate with divinity."

The Dream Dance has seen a revival, along with indigenous culture and language in general, and as of around 2008 there were an estimated 27 Dream Dance groups in Minnesota and Wisconsin and more in Iowa and Kansas.

== Ceremonies ==
The Dream Dance has been described as a religious variant of the grass dance, although James Clifton disagreed with that assessment, pointing to the different origins and themes of each dance ritual; Clifton described the grass dance as the "ritual prototype" of the Dream Dance. The highly specific ritual treatment and decoration of the Dream Drum is unique, and has no precedent in the grass dance. Because of the importance of the drum itself to the Dream Dance, no other instruments are used in its ceremonies.

James S. Slotkin, having done fieldwork from 1949-1951 in Zoar, described the Menominee form of the Dream Dance rite as consisting of a drum circle, singing and dancing, collective and silent prayer, and ritual offerings to spirits.

Fred K. Blessing visited a Dream Dance ceremony at the Lac Courte Oreilles Ojibwe reservation in northern Wisconsin in October of 1960. The ceremony consisted of making tobacco offerings, drumming and singing, a communal meal, an offering of money to the drums, and a naming ceremony for a local child. He noted that the ceremony leader gave an Ojibwe-language sermon which invoked Jesus and Gitche Manitou (the Great Spirit).

The ritual transferring of the drum is a key ceremony of the Dream Dance religion. Tailfeather Woman's original vision focused on peace and brotherhood between different peoples, and so she taught that the drum and its associated rituals should be passed geographically clockwise from tribe to tribe. The transfer ritual is accompanied by gifts and songs.

=== Henry Davis variant ===
A unique version of the Dream Dance at Mille Lacs, Minnesota, was identified in 1963. The Henry Davis variant, called such after the owner of the Mille Lacs Dream Drum at the time, was noted for its particularly strong Christian influence. The ceremony took place only on Easter, and was characterized by the appearance of a young girl in a white dress representing the Virgin Mary.

== Drum ==
Tailfeather Woman's vision prescribed a detailed set of rules concerning the construction and decoration of the Dream Drum. The frame is traditionally a wooden washtub or barrel, over which cow, moose, or horse rawhide is stretched. The two drumheads are laced together over the side, using a long strip of hide as thread. Four looped straps (made of leather, rawhide, or occasionally otter fur) are attached to the side, which are used to suspend the drum from four stakes. The four straps represent the four cardinal points. Some drums have small bells suspended inside of them. Decorations for the drum include the skirt, which is often left plain; the belt, which is often decorated with elaborate beadwork; a strip of fur around the top edge; fringe, pendants, tassels, coins, metal cones (like those of jingle dresses), and other ornaments. Of particular note are four decorated tabs which hang from the drum equidistant from each strap, therefore pointing to the northwest, northeast, southeast, and southwest when in ceremonial position. The tabs often have spiritual symbols: typically the human hand or a human figure. These two symbols are typically found together on the tabs of the same drum. The human hand is understood as representing the hand of God or Gitche Manitou, while the human figure, which varies widely in form, represents a spirit (often Gitche Manitou). The decoration of the drumhead is the primary distinguishing factor of a ceremonial Dream Drum from a more secular drum. Dream Drums are decorated based on spiritual visions of the owner, therefore they vary widely.

Among the Ojibwe and Menominee, the Dream Drum is treated as if it is a living being. The Ojibwe historically addressed it as gimishoomisinaan (lit. 'Our Grandfather'). Drums are not allowed to touch the ground and are covered at all times, and are given a "bed" of blankets and rugs in its owner's house. At night, a lamp next to it is lit. The drum is also ritually dressed, fed, visited by devotees, and presented with offerings. When a drum is broken, people surround it so as to benefit from the spiritual power released by the drum.
