= Billie Frechette =

Woman known for her relationship with John Dillinger

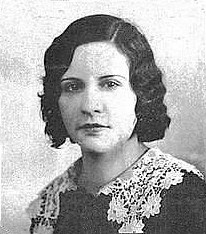
- Born: September 15, 1907; Neopit (Menominee Indian Reservation), Wisconsin, U.S.
- Died: January 13, 1969 (aged 61); Shawano, Wisconsin, U.S.
- Spouses: Welton Sparks (m. 1925; div. 1933) John Dillinger (m. 1933; died 1934): Arthur Tic (post-1940); Name unknown (post-1940)
- Criminal charges: Harboring a criminal
- Penalty: 2 years in prison without parole

Mary Evelyn "Billie" Frechette (September 15, 1907 – January 13, 1969) was an American woman known for her personal relationship with the bank robber John Dillinger in the early 1930s.

Frechette is known to have been involved with Dillinger for about six months, until her arrest and imprisonment in 1934. She finished two years in prison in 1936, then toured the United States with Dillinger's family for five years with their "Crime Doesn't Pay" show. She married and returned to the Menominee Indian Reservation, where she was born, for a quieter life in her later decades.

== Early life ==
Mary Evelyn ("Billie") Frechette was born in Neopit, Wisconsin, on the Menominee Indian Reservation. She described the background of her mother (née Mary Labell) as "half French and half Indian", and that of her father as simply French.

Frechette's father died when she was eight years old. She attended a mission school on the reservation, and then was sent to a government boarding school for Indians in South Dakota. After time there, she moved to her aunt's to become a nurse. At the age of 18, she moved to Chicago to be closer to her sister. On April 24, 1928, she gave birth to her only child, William Edward Frechette, while residing in an unwed mother's home in Chicago. William lived for three months before dying on July 24, 1928.

== Marriage and family ==
Frechette and "Walter Sparks" (Welton Walter Spark) married on August 2, 1932, in Chicago. Spark had been sentenced, with two others, on July 20, 1932, to a 15-year term at Leavenworth for three counts of robbery of postal substations in drug stores. Walter Spark and his co-defendant, Arthur Cherrington, both married the same day, Cherrington to Patricia Young (who later on became known as Patricia Cherrington and as the girlfriend of another gangster, John Hamilton). Their marriage ceremonies were conducted at the Cook County Jail by Chaplain E. N. Ware. Spark and Cherrington entered Leavenworth on August 13, 1932.

== Involvement with John Dillinger ==
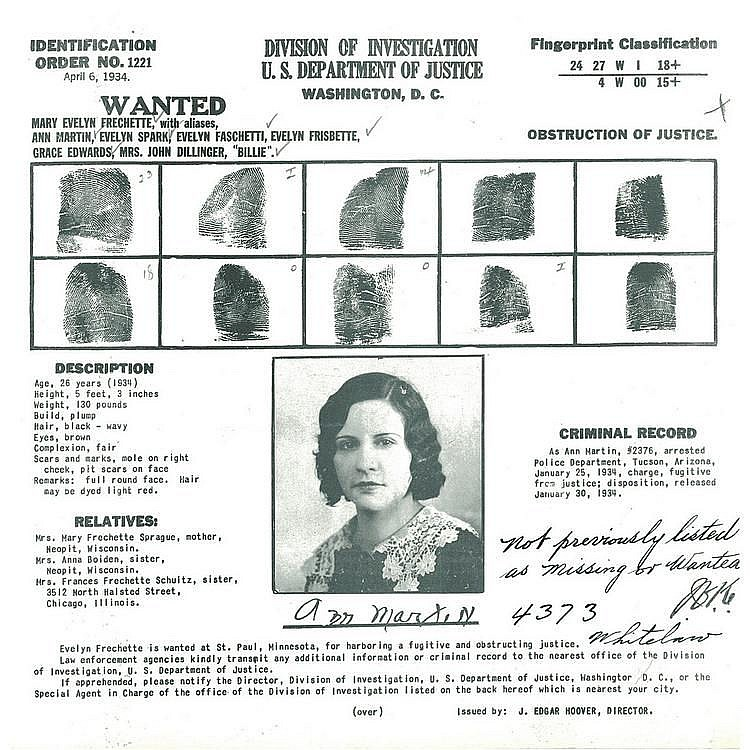
FBI wanted order

Frechette met John Dillinger at a cabaret in November 1933. They began a relationship soon after that. Frechette was quoted as saying, "John was good to me. He looked after me and bought me all kinds of jewelry and cars and pets, and we went places and saw things, and he gave me everything a girl wants. He treated me like a lady". Frechette assumed more marital roles with Dillinger than an accomplice. She once drove a getaway car after Dillinger was shot by the police. She was arrested on April 9, 1934, for allowing him to hide in her St. Paul, Minnesota, apartment and for obstruction of justice. Dillinger and a companion watched the arrest from a block away. Dillinger wanted to attack the lawmen and rescue her, but accepted the argument that he would die in the attempt. He was killed by police on July 22 of that year.

Frechette served two years at the Federal Correctional Farm in Milan, Michigan, for violating the Federal Harboring Law. She was released in 1936.

== Later life ==
Frechette traveled with the Dillinger family for five years after her release and his death. The traveling show was "Crime Doesn't Pay." Frechette returned to the Menominee Reservation, where she had two subsequent marriages. She died of cancer on January 13, 1969, at age 61 in Shawano, Wisconsin. She is buried in Woodlawn Cemetery next to her third husband, Arthur Tic.

== Popular culture ==
- In the 1973 film Dillinger, Frechette was played by Michelle Phillips.
- In the 1991 film Dillinger, Frechette was played by Sherilyn Fenn.
- In the 2009 film Public Enemies, Frechette was played by Marion Cotillard.
