= Menominee County, Wisconsin =

County in Wisconsin, United States

- County and Wisconsin town
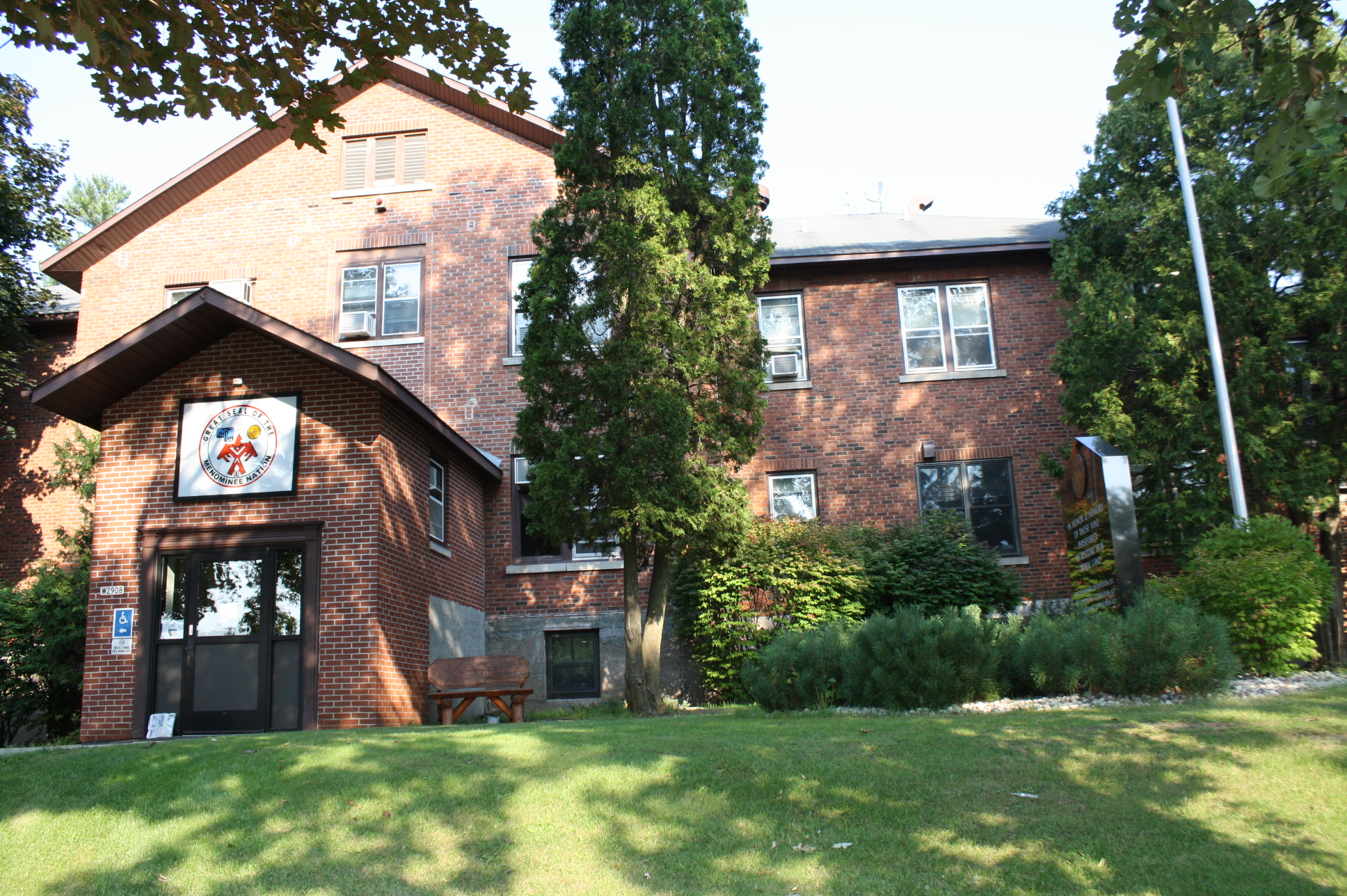
- Menominee Indian Tribal Offices in Keshena, Wisconsin

- Location within the U.S. state of Wisconsin
- Coordinates: 45°01′N 88°42′W
- Country: United States
- State: Wisconsin
- Founded: July 3, 1959
- Named for: Menominee tribe
- Seat: Keshena
- Largest town: Menominee

Area
  - Total: 365 sq mi (950 km^{2})
  - Land: 358 sq mi (930 km^{2})
  - Water: 7.4 sq mi (19 km^{2}) 2.0%

Population (2020)
  - Total: 4,255
  - Estimate (2025): 4,199 ▼
  - Density: 11.9/sq mi (4.6/km^{2})
- Time zone: UTC−6 (Central)
  - Summer (DST): UTC−5 (CDT)
- Congressional district: 8th
- Website: www.co.menominee.wi.us

Menominee County is a county in the U.S. state of Wisconsin. As of the 2020 census, the population was 4,255, making it the least populous county in Wisconsin. Its county seat is in the community of Keshena.

Menominee is Wisconsin's newest county, having been created in 1959 after recognition of the Menominee tribe was terminated by federal law. In 1974, the tribe regained federal recognition and restoration of most of its reservation. Today Menominee County is essentially coterminous with the boundaries of the federally recognized Menominee Indian Reservation. The county's government is consolidated with the coterminous Town of Menominee.

Menominee County is included in the Shawano, WI Micropolitan Statistical Area, which is also included in the Green Bay–Shawano, WI Combined Statistical Area.

== History ==
The county was created from the northeastern portion of seven townships of Shawano County and the western three townships of Oconto County on July 3, 1959, in anticipation of the termination of the Menominee Indian Reservation in 1961. The reservation status was restored in 1973, and is now co-extensive with the county.

Most of the land within the county boundary is under Federal trust for the exclusive use by enrolled members of the Menominee nation. Scattered parcels that were purchased during termination, as well as many lots around the Legend Lake area in the southeastern part of the county, are the only parts of the county that are privately owned by non-Native Americans. Most of Menominee County's population consists of members of the Menominee nation.

Menomonee County is the only county in Wisconsin that is designated as a "persistent poverty" county, meaning that its poverty rate was at least 20% in four measurements since 1990.

== Geography ==
According to the U.S. Census Bureau, the county has a total area of 365 square miles (950 km^{2}), of which 358 square miles (930 km^{2}) is land and 7.4 square miles (19 km^{2}) (2.0%) is water. It is the second-smallest county in Wisconsin by total area.

Soils of Menominee County

=== Adjacent counties ===
- Oconto County – east
- Shawano County – south
- Langlade County – northwest

=== Major highways ===
- Highway 47 (Wisconsin)
- Highway 55 (Wisconsin)

== Demographics ==
Historical population
| Census | Pop. | Note | %± |
|---|---|---|---|
| 1970 | 2,607 | | — |
| 1980 | 3,373 | | 29.4% |
| 1990 | 3,890 | | 15.3% |
| 2000 | 4,562 | | 17.3% |
| 2010 | 4,232 | | −7.2% |
| 2020 | 4,255 | | 0.5% |
| 2025 (est.) | 4,199 | ▼ | −1.3% |
U.S. Decennial Census; 1900–1990 1990–2000; 2010 2020

2000 Census Age Pyramid for Menominee County

=== 2020 census ===
As of the 2020 census, the county had a population of 4,255. The median age was 34.5 years, 32.0% of residents were under the age of 18, and 15.5% of residents were 65 years of age or older. For every 100 females there were 96.5 males, and for every 100 females age 18 and over there were 89.8 males age 18 and over.

There were 1,361 households, including 1,064 families, and 40.7% of households had children under the age of 18 living in them. Of all households, 36.4% were married-couple households, 17.4% were households with a male householder and no spouse or partner present, 31.8% were households with a female householder and no spouse or partner present, 19.9% were made up of individuals, and 9.0% had someone living alone who was 65 years of age or older.

The population density was 11.9 people per square mile (4.6 people/km^{2}). There were 2,145 housing units at an average density of 6.0 units per square mile (2.3 units/km^{2}). Among those units, 36.6% were vacant; of the occupied units, 72.1% were owner-occupied and 27.9% were renter-occupied, with a homeowner vacancy rate of 0.3% and a rental vacancy rate of 4.8%.

The racial makeup of the county was 11.8% White, <0.1% Black or African American, 85.6% American Indian and Alaska Native, <0.1% Asian, 0.1% Native Hawaiian and Pacific Islander, 0.1% from some other race, and 2.4% from two or more races. Hispanic or Latino residents of any race comprised 3.2% of the population.

<0.1% of residents lived in urban areas, while 100.0% lived in rural areas.

=== Racial and ethnic composition ===
Menominee County, Wisconsin – Racial and ethnic composition Note: the US Census treats Hispanic/Latino as an ethnic category. This table excludes Latinos from the racial categories and assigns them to a separate category. Hispanics/Latinos may be of any race.
| Race / ethnicity (NH = Non-Hispanic) | Pop 1980 | Pop 1990 | Pop 2000 | Pop 2010 | Pop 2020 | % 1980 | % 1990 | % 2000 | % 2010 | % 2020 |
|---|---|---|---|---|---|---|---|---|---|---|
| White alone (NH) | 351 | 413 | 526 | 447 | 483 | 10.41% | 10.62% | 11.53% | 10.56% | 11.35% |
| Black or African American alone (NH) | 0 | 0 | 3 | 19 | 2 | 0.00% | 0.00% | 0.07% | 0.45% | 0.05% |
| Native American or Alaska Native alone (NH) | 2,963 | 3,422 | 3,876 | 3,538 | 3,549 | 87.84% | 87.97% | 84.96% | 83.60% | 83.41% |
| Asian alone (NH) | 2 | 0 | 0 | 1 | 2 | 0.06% | 0.00% | 0.00% | 0.02% | 0.05% |
| Native Hawaiian or Pacific Islander alone (NH) | x | x | 1 | 0 | 2 | x | x | 0.02% | 0.00% | 0.05% |
| Other race alone (NH) | 0 | 0 | 4 | 0 | 0 | 0.00% | 0.00% | 0.09% | 0.00% | 0.00% |
| Mixed race or Multiracial (NH) | x | x | 30 | 49 | 81 | x | x | 0.66% | 1.16% | 1.90% |
| Hispanic or Latino (any race) | 57 | 55 | 122 | 178 | 136 | 1.69% | 1.41% | 2.67% | 4.21% | 3.20% |
| Total | 3,373 | 3,890 | 4,562 | 4,232 | 4,255 | 100.00% | 100.00% | 100.00% | 100.00% | 100.00% |

=== 2000 census ===
At the 2000 census there were 4,562 people, 1,345 households, and 1,065 families in the county. This total makes it the least-populated county in the state. The population density was 13 people per square mile (5.0 people/km^{2}). There were 2,098 housing units at an average density of 6 units per square mile (2.3 units/km^{2}). The racial makup of the county was 11.57% White, 0.07% Black or African American, 87.26% Native American, 0.02% Pacific Islander, 0.33% from other races, and 0.75% from two or more races. 2.67%. were Hispanic or Latino of any race. 5.0% were of German ancestry. 89.8% spoke English, 7.0% Menominee and 1.6% Hmong as their first language. At over 80% of the county's population, Menominee County has the highest percentage of Native Americans in the state of Wisconsin by far.

Of the 1,345 households 42.20% had children under the age of 18 living with them, 42.50% were married couples living together, 26.60% had a female householder with no husband present, and 20.80% were non-families. 16.50% of households were one person and 6.40% were one person aged 65 or older. The average household size was 3.35 and the average family size was 3.66.

The age distribution was 38.90% under the age of 18, 8.40% from 18 to 24, 24.70% from 25 to 44, 19.50% from 45 to 64, and 8.50% 65 or older. The median age was 28 years. For every 100 females there were 97.30 males. For every 100 females age 18 and over, there were 92.30 males.

In 2017, there were 89 births, giving a general fertility rate of 115.9 births per 1000 women aged 15–44, the highest rate out of all 72 Wisconsin counties.

== Politics ==
United States presidential election results for Menominee County, Wisconsin
| Year | Republican | | Democratic | | Third party(ies) | |
| Year | No. | % | No. | % | No. | % |
|---|---|---|---|---|---|---|
| 1964 | 78 | 10.74% | 647 | 89.12% | 1 | 0.14% |
| 1968 | 179 | 24.19% | 531 | 71.76% | 30 | 4.05% |
| 1972 | 355 | 36.37% | 608 | 62.30% | 13 | 1.33% |
| 1976 | 324 | 28.88% | 766 | 68.27% | 32 | 2.85% |
| 1980 | 302 | 32.26% | 544 | 58.12% | 90 | 9.62% |
| 1984 | 392 | 31.84% | 832 | 67.59% | 7 | 0.57% |
| 1988 | 381 | 26.89% | 1,028 | 72.55% | 8 | 0.56% |
| 1992 | 244 | 21.03% | 691 | 59.57% | 225 | 19.40% |
| 1996 | 230 | 17.04% | 992 | 73.48% | 128 | 9.48% |
| 2000 | 225 | 18.25% | 949 | 76.97% | 59 | 4.79% |
| 2004 | 288 | 16.84% | 1,412 | 82.57% | 10 | 0.58% |
| 2008 | 185 | 12.78% | 1,257 | 86.81% | 6 | 0.41% |
| 2012 | 179 | 13.00% | 1,191 | 86.49% | 7 | 0.51% |
| 2016 | 267 | 20.41% | 1,002 | 76.61% | 39 | 2.98% |
| 2020 | 278 | 17.48% | 1,303 | 81.95% | 9 | 0.57% |
| 2024 | 296 | 18.83% | 1,266 | 80.53% | 10 | 0.64% |

Menominee County has always been a Democratic stronghold. In every election since its creation, Menominee has been the most Democratic-leaning county in Wisconsin. No Republican has ever won even 40% of the county's vote in its history. It is one of only four counties in the entire nation that has never voted for a Republican presidential candidate, the others being Jim Hogg and Brooks counties in South Texas and Kalawao County, Hawaii.

== Communities ==
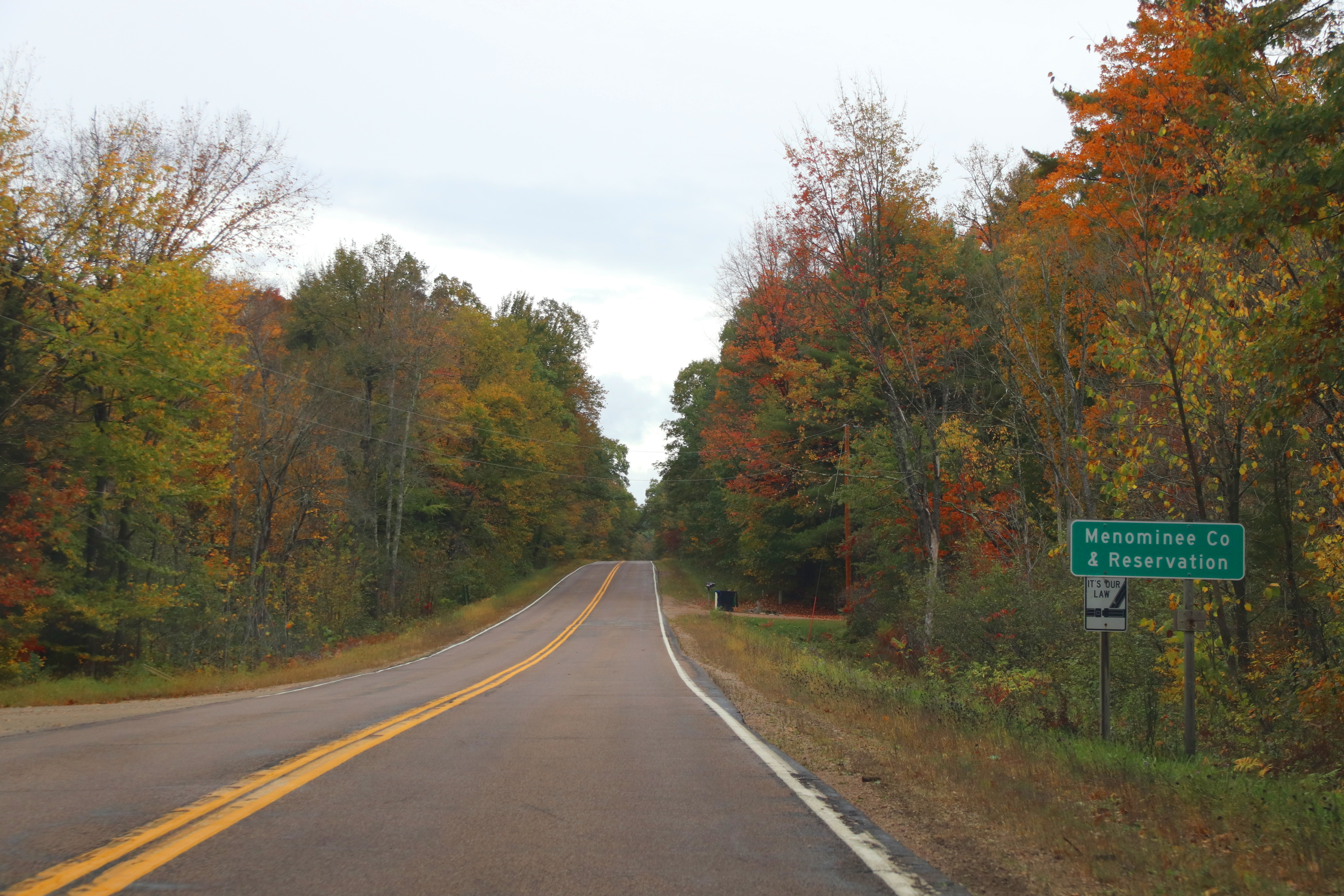
Entrance sign on WIS 47

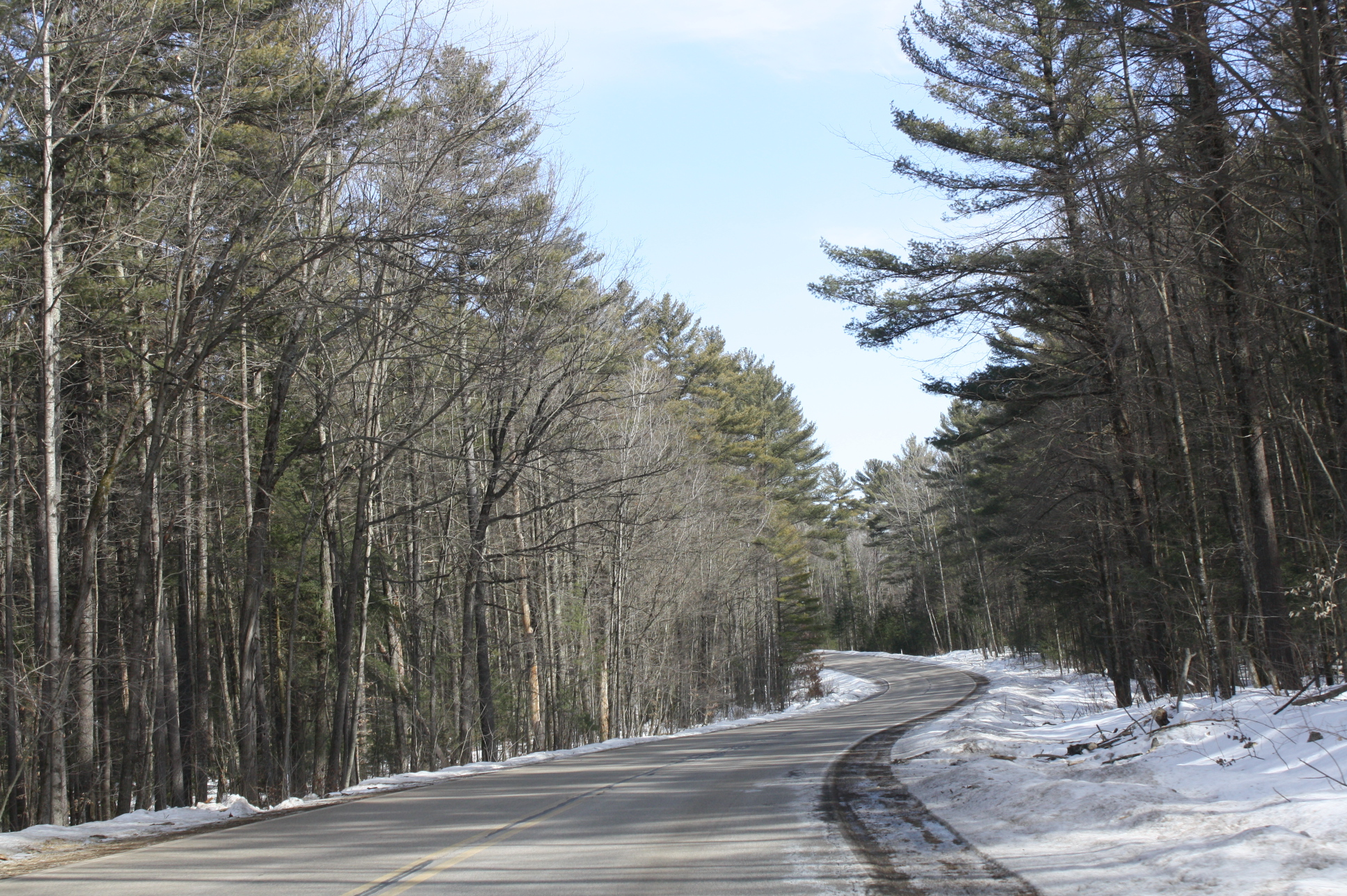
Woods occupy most of Menominee County.

Menominee County is one of only two counties in Wisconsin with no incorporated communities, the other being Florence County.

=== Census-designated places ===
- Keshena (county seat)
- Legend Lake
- Middle Village (partial)
- Neopit
- Zoar

=== Ghost town/neighborhood ===
- Perote

== See also ==
- National Register of Historic Places listings in Menominee County, Wisconsin
