= Legend Lake, Wisconsin =

Census-designated place in Wisconsin, United States

- CDP
- Nickname: Lake Of Legends
- Location in Menominee County and the state of Wisconsin.
- Coordinates: 44°53′49″N 88°33′49″W
- Country: United States
- State: Wisconsin
- County: Menominee

Area
  - Total: 20.5 sq mi (53.1 km^{2})
  - Land: 16.8 sq mi (43.6 km^{2})
  - Water: 3.7 sq mi (9.5 km^{2})
- Elevation: 458 ft (140 m)

Population (2020)
  - Total: 1,670
  - Density: 99.2/sq mi (38.3/km^{2})
- Time zone: UTC-6 (Central (CST))
  - Summer (DST): UTC-5 (CDT)
- Area codes: 715 & 534
- FIPS code: 55-43207

Legend Lake is a census-designated place (CDP) in Menominee County, Wisconsin, United States, on the Menominee Indian Reservation. The population was 1,670 at the 2020 census.

== Geography ==
Legend Lake is located at 44°53′49″N 88°33′49″W (44.896811, -88.563718).

According to the United States Census Bureau, the CDP has a total area of 20.5 square miles (53.1 km^{2}), of which 16.8 square miles (43.6 km^{2}) is land and 3.7 square miles (9.5 km^{2}) (17.93%) is water.

== Demographics ==
=== 2020 census ===
As of the census of 2020, the population was 1,670. The population density was 99.2 inhabitants per square mile (38.3/km^{2}). There were 1,352 housing units at an average density of 80.3 per square mile (31.0/km^{2}). The racial makeup of the CDP was 71.0% Native American, 25.1% White, 0.1% Asian, 0.1% from other races, and 3.7% from two or more races. Ethnically, the population was 3.7% Hispanic or Latino of any race.

=== 2000 census ===
As of the census of 2000, there were 1,533 people, 538 households, and 401 families residing in the CDP. The population density was 91.0 people per square mile (35.1/km^{2}). There were 1,232 housing units at an average density of 73.1/sq mi (28.2/km^{2}). The racial makeup of the CDP was 28.11% White, 0.07% African American, 70.25% Native American, 0.59% from other races, and 0.98% from two or more races. Hispanic or Latino of any race were 3.13% of the population.

There were 538 households, out of which 28.8% had children under the age of 18 living with them, 52.0% were married couples living together, 15.1% had a female householder with no husband present, and 25.3% were non-families. 20.1% of all households were made up of individuals, and 7.4% had someone living alone who was 65 years of age or older. The average household size was 2.85, and the average family size was 3.20.

In the CDP, the population was spread out, with 30.6% under the age of 18, 7.3% from 18 to 24, 21.9% from 25 to 44, 27.2% from 45 to 64, and 13.0% who were 65 years of age or older. The median age was 38 years. For every 100 females, there were 93.1 males. For every 100 females age 18 and over, there were 94.2 males.

The median income for a household in the CDP was $38,393, and the median income for a family was $38,333. Males had a median income of $25,833 versus $23,750 for females. The per capita income for the CDP was $14,512. About 12.6% of families and 17.5% of the population were below the poverty line, including 26.9% of those under age 18 and 2.7% of those age 65 or over.

== Property Owners Association ==
The Legend Lake Property Owners Association (LLPOA) is the land and property owner group for the Legend Lake development. Established in 1972, the LLPOA's main office is located on Old South Branch Road on the east side of the lake, serving as a community gathering place with a boat launch. Members have access to beach clubs and compost sites. The association also publishes a quarterly magazine, Smoke Signals Along the Lake.

In 2018, the LLPOA filed a lawsuit against the Menominee Indian Tribe of Wisconsin and a tribal member, attempting to enforce 2009 restrictive covenants. These covenants were designed to prevent the tribe from reacquiring Legend Lake parcels and placing them into federal trust, a move that removes the land from county tax rolls. In June 2026, the Wisconsin Supreme Court ruled 4–3 in favor of the tribe, dismissing the LLPOA's lawsuit and upholding tribal sovereign immunity.

== See also ==
- List of census-designated places in Wisconsin
