= Alanson B. Skinner =

American anthropologist (1885–1925)

- Born: September 7, 1885; Buffalo, New York
- Died: August 17, 1925 (aged 39); Tokio, North Dakota

Alanson Buck Skinner (September 7, 1885 – August 17, 1925) was an American anthropologist best known for his ethnographical work among Native American communities in the United States.

Skinner was born on September 7th, 1885 in Buffalo, New York. He was raised on Staten Island and received education at Columbia University and Harvard University. After graduating from high school in 1907, Skinner worked for the American Museum of Natural History, National Museum of the American Indian, and Milwaukee Public Museum. He collected ethnographic information from the Cree, Saulteaux, Menominee, Ojibwe, Oneida, Ho-Chunk, Dakota, Bungi, and Seminole.

Skinner died on August 17th, 1925, in an automobile accident near Tokio, North Dakota while on a field expedition among the Sioux.
