= Menominee Indian Reservation =

Menominee Indian Reservation Omāēqnomenēw Eskōnekan
- Indian reservation
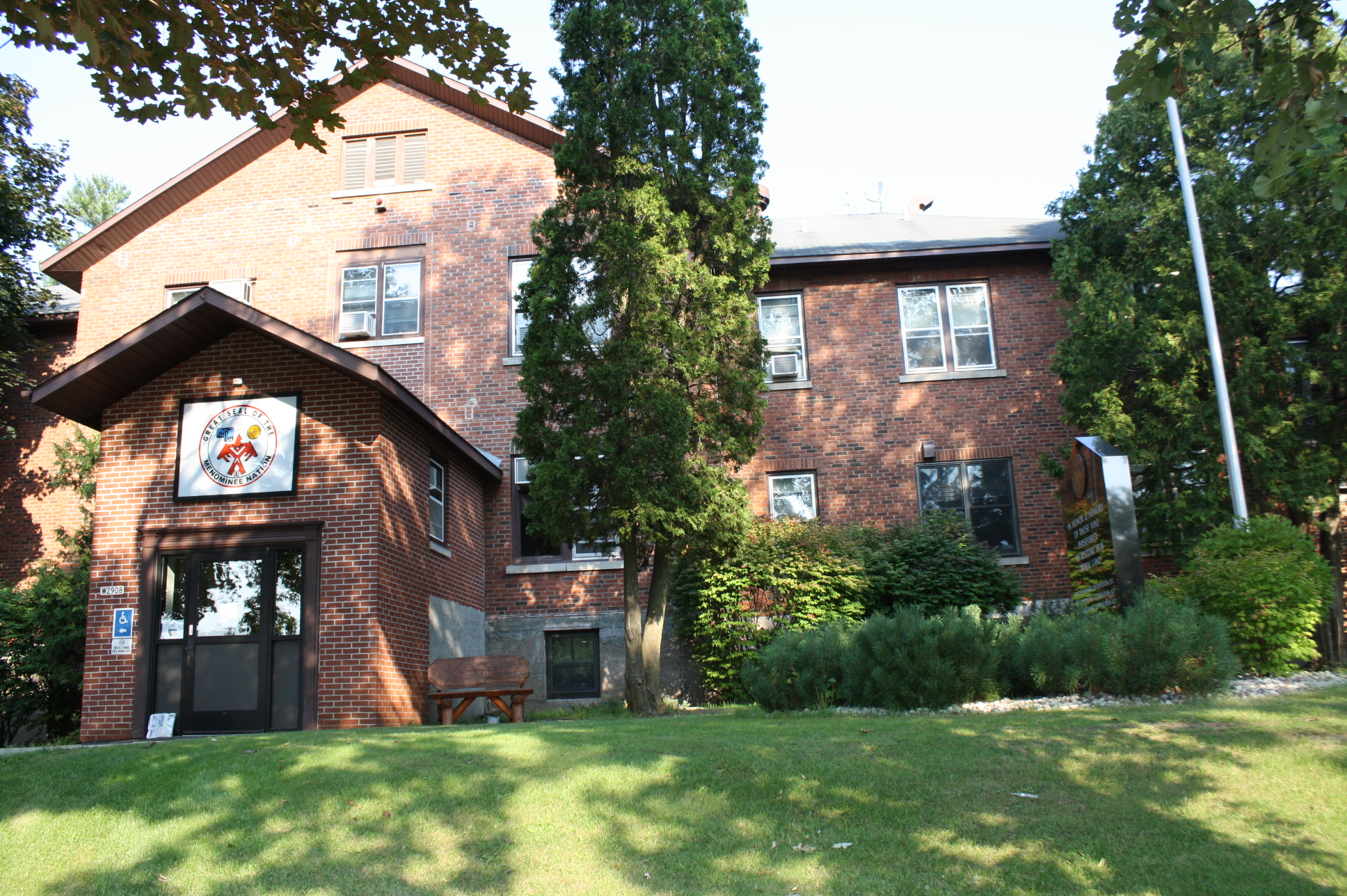
- Menominee Tribal Hall

- Location in Wisconsin
- Tribe: Menominee Indian Tribe of Wisconsin
- Country: United States
- State: Wisconsin
- County: Menominee
- Headquarters: Keshena

Government
  - Body: Menominee Legislature
  - Chairwoman: Gena Kakkak
  - Vice-Chairperson: To Be Determined
  - Secretary: Joey Awonohopay

Area
  - Total: 362.791 sq mi (939.62 km^{2})
  - Land: 355.444 sq mi (920.60 km^{2})
  - Water: 7.347 sq mi (19.03 km^{2})
- Area includes off-reservation trust land

Population (2020)
  - Total: 3,293
  - Density: 9.3/sq mi (3.6/km^{2})
  - Reservation: 3,032
  - Off-reservation trust land: 261
- Website: menominee-nsn.gov

The Menominee Indian Reservation (Menominee: Omāēqnomenēw Eskōnekan, oh-mat-na-mah-nay es-co-nee-cun) is an Indian reservation located in northeastern Wisconsin held in trust by the United States for the Menominee Tribe of Wisconsin. It is the largest Indian reservation east of the Mississippi River. In the Menominee language, it is called Omāēqnomenēw-Otāēskonenan, "Menominee Thing Set Apart", or alternatively omǣqnomenēw-ahkīheh, "in the Menominee Country".

== Geography ==
The Menominee Indian Reservation technically consists of both a 360.8 sq mi (934.5 km^{2}) Indian reservation in Menominee County, Wisconsin and an adjacent 1.96 sq mi (5.08 km^{2}) plot of off-reservation trust land encompassing Middle Village in the town of Red Springs, in Shawano County, Wisconsin. These areas are governed as a single unit for most purposes. According to the U.S. Census Bureau, the combined reservation and off-reservation trust land have a total area of 362.8 square miles (939.6 km^{2}), of which 355.5 square miles (920.7 km^{2}) is land and 7.3 square miles (18.9 km^{2}) is water. The Menominee have no off-reservation trust land except that which is directly contiguous with the reservation.

The reservation is mostly conterminous with Menominee County, Wisconsin. Within the county, there are numerous small pockets of territory that are not considered to be part of the reservation. These pockets amount to 1.14 percent of the county's area; the reservation takes up about 98.86 percent of the county's area. The largest of these pockets is in the western part of the community of Keshena.

The non-reservation parts of the county are more densely populated than the reservation, with 1,223 (28.7%) of the county's 4,255 total population, as opposed to the reservation's 3,032 (71.3%) population in the 2020 census. The most populous communities are Legend Lake and Keshena. The Menominee operate a number of gambling facilities. Most of the reservation land is heavily forested.

== Communities ==
Community	Menominee name	2020 Population
Keshena	Kesīqnæh	1,257
Legend Lake		1,670
Middle Village	Nanāweyah omenīkān	290
Neopit	Neyōpet	616
Zoar	Saqnawæpaniw	107

== Education ==
The Menominee founded the College of the Menominee Nation, a tribal college, in 1993. It was accredited in 1998. The main campus is in Keshena.

== Language ==
Both English as well as the Menominee language, part of the Algonquian language family, are used.

== History and jurisdiction ==
The Menominee Reservation is the only reservation in Wisconsin that is not subject to state jurisdiction under Public Law 280. This means that the Menominee Nation or the federal government generally holds legal jurisdiction over tribal members for crimes and civil disputes that occur within the reservation boundaries. The state still maintains jurisdiction over crimes on the reservation when neither the perpetrator nor the victim is a tribal member.

Federal recognition of the Menominee tribe was terminated by the United States Congress in 1961. The Menominee Indian Reservation was reestablished in 1973.

== Demographics ==
As of the census of 2020, the combined population of Menominee Reservation and Off-Reservation Trust Land was 3,293 (including 3,032 on the reservation and 261 on off-reservation trust land). The population density was 9.3 inhabitants per square mile (3.6/km^{2}). There were 1,027 housing units at an average density of 2.9 per square mile (1.1/km^{2}). The racial makeup of the reservation and off-reservation trust land was 94.1% Native American, 3.8% White, 0.2% Black or African American, 0.1% from other races, and 1.8% from two or more races. Ethnically, the population was 2.2% Hispanic or Latino of any race.

According to the American Community Survey estimates for 2016-2020, the median income for a household (including the reservation and off-reservation trust land) was $44,402, and the median income for a family was $46,176. Male full-time workers had a median income of $31,439 versus $34,871 for female workers. The per capita income was $15,249. About 29.0% of families and 33.1% of the population were below the poverty line, including 43.2% of those under age 18 and 17.3% of those age 65 or over. Of the population age 25 and over, 92.0% were high school graduates or higher and 12.5% had a bachelor's degree or higher.

== Economy ==
=== Lumber ===
The Menominee Indian Reservation contains a large forest that has been managed by the Menominee Tribe for over 150 years. About 15 million board feet are harvested from the forest every year. This forestry work has been recognized by the United Nations. Wood from the forest has gone to such places as the Milwaukee Bucks arena, Fiserv Forum. The types of trees harvested at the Menominee Indian Reservation include white ash, bigtooth aspen, quaking aspen, basswood, beech, eastern hemlock, eastern white pine, hard maple, pin oak, red oak, red pine, soft maple, and yellow birch.

=== Cannabis ===
In August 2015 the Menominee Indian Reservation held advisory referendums on proposed measures to legalize medical and recreational cannabis. Both passed. They are sovereign on their reservation.

In October 2015, Drug Enforcement Administration (DEA) agents raided the reservation, taking or destroying 30,000 plants. The Menominee said these were industrial hemp plants, the cultivation of which was authorized by federal law. The DEA contends it was marijuana.

=== Bison ===
A bison herd was put on 66 acres (27 ha) which was once a non-tribal farm. A restoration process will include prescribed burning to bring back native grass for the bison to feed on. A youth program has been developed around the culture of this sacred and once essential animal.

=== Food sovereignty ===
In October 2021, a USDA pilot project called the Food Distribution Program on Indian Reservations (FDPIR) Self-Determination Demonstration Project began. As part of the pilot, a joint project with the Oneida Nation of Wisconsin, the Menominee are using federal dollars to buy food produced on the reservation, including apples, buffalo meat, beef, wild rice, and fish, and distributing it for free to low-income members of its tribe.
