= Zoar, Wisconsin =

Census-designated place in Wisconsin, United States

Zoar Saqnawehnaen
- CDP
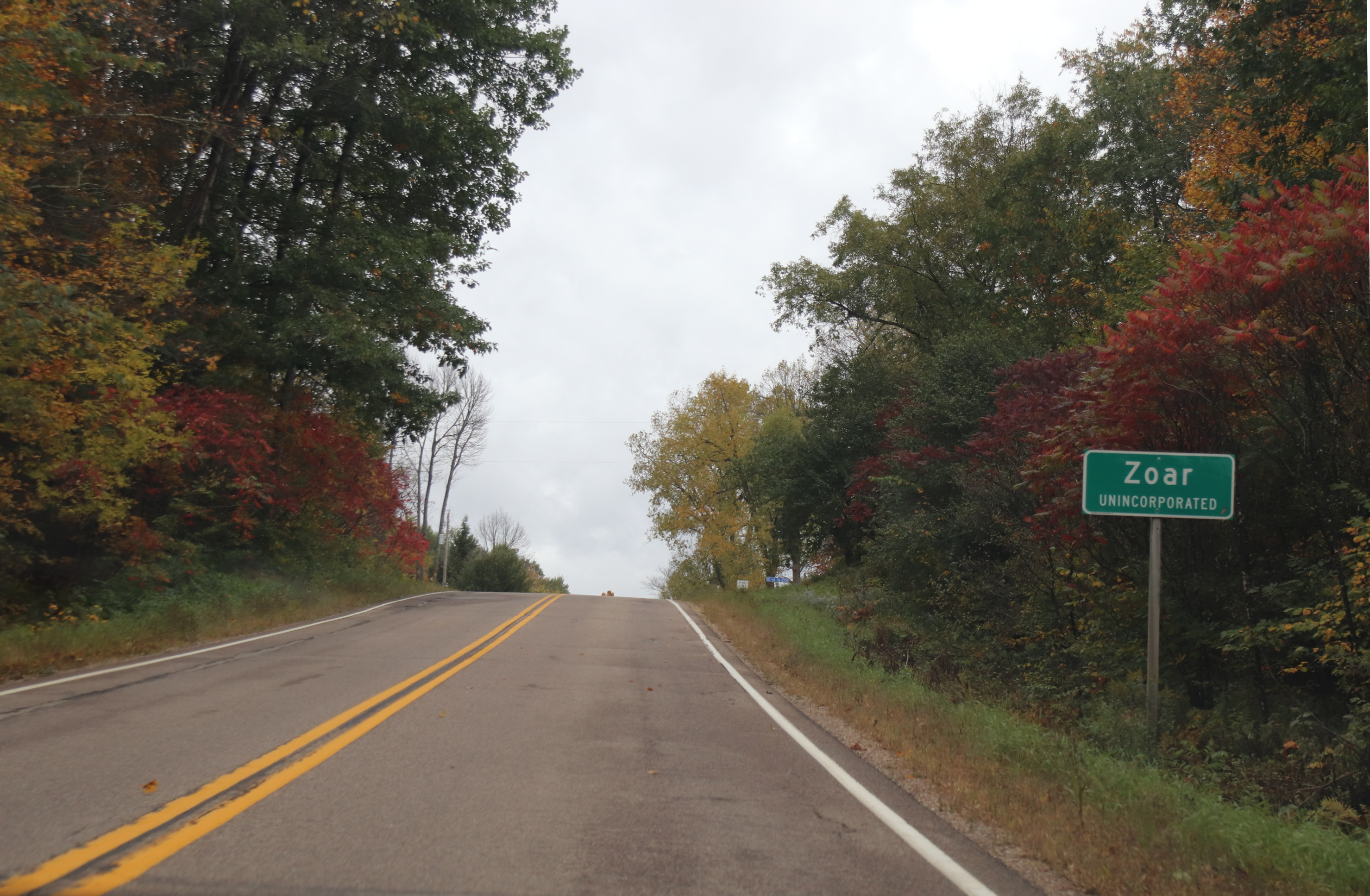
- Sign for Zoar on Wisconsin Highway 47

- Location in Menominee County and the state of Wisconsin.
- Coordinates: 45°0′54″N 88°53′58″W
- Country: United States
- State: Wisconsin
- County: Menominee
- Tribe: Menominee Nation

Area
  - Total: 8.561 sq mi (22.17 km^{2})
  - Land: 8.549 sq mi (22.14 km^{2})
  - Water: 0.012 sq mi (0.031 km^{2})
- Elevation: 1,220 ft (372 m)

Population (2020)
  - Total: 107
  - Density: 12.5/sq mi (4.8/km^{2})
- Time zone: UTC-6 (Central (CST))
  - Summer (DST): UTC-5 (CDT)
- Area codes: 715 & 534
- FIPS code: 55-89760
- GNIS feature ID: 1577183

Zoar (Menominee: Saqnawehnaen) is a census-designated place (CDP) and unincorporated community in Menominee County, Wisconsin, United States. The population was 107 at the 2020 census. Zoar is located along Wisconsin Highway 47, approximately 3 miles (4.8 km) northwest of Neopit.

== History ==
Zoar has been a center of Menominee traditionalism (also described as "native-oriented") since around the time the reservation was created in 1852. This native-oriented group adheres to aboriginal religious traditions such as the Dream Dance, War Dance, and Medicine Lodge. Another group in the Zoar area, distinct from the traditionalists, adheres to the Native American Church (also called Peyotism). Both of these groups have been declining in number.

== Geography ==
According to the United States Census Bureau, the CDP has a total area of 8.561 square miles (22.17 km^{2}); 8.549 square miles (22.14 km^{2}) of this is land, and 0.012 square miles (0.031 km^{2}) is water.

== Demographics ==
=== 2020 census ===
As of the census of 2020, there were 107 people (15 households) residing in the CDP. The population density was 12.5 people per square mile. There were 30 housing units at an average density of 3.5/sq mi. The racial makeup of the CDP was 5.6% White, 92.52% Native American, and 1.87% from two or more races. There were no Hispanic or Latino residents.

=== 2000 census ===
As of the census of 2000, there were 124 people, 29 households, and 24 families residing in the CDP. The population density was 14.4 people per square mile (5.6/km^{2}). There were 34 housing units at an average density of 4.0/sq mi (1.5/km^{2}). The racial makeup of the CDP was 4.84% White, 93.55% Native American, and 1.61% from two or more races. Hispanic or Latino of any race were 4.03% of the population.

There were 29 households, out of which 55.2% had children under the age of 18 living with them, 51.7% were married couples living together, 20.7% had a female householder with no husband present, and 17.2% were non-families. 13.8% of all households were made up of individuals, and 3.4% had someone living alone who was 65 years of age or older. The average household size was 4.28 and the average family size was 4.42.

In the CDP, the population was spread out, with 44.4% under the age of 18, 10.5% from 18 to 24, 23.4% from 25 to 44, 16.9% from 45 to 64, and 4.8% who were 65 years of age or older. The median age was 20 years. For every 100 females, there were 96.8 males. For every 100 females age 18 and over, there were 81.6 males.

The median income for a household in the CDP was $24,375, and the median income for a family was $30,625. Males had a median income of $16,875 versus $21,250 for females. The per capita income for the CDP was $7,101. There were 11.8% of families and 17.2% of the population living below the poverty line, including 17.1% of those under 18 and none of those over 64.
