= Neopit, Wisconsin =

Census-designated place in Wisconsin, United States

Neopit, Wisconsin Neyōpet
- CDP
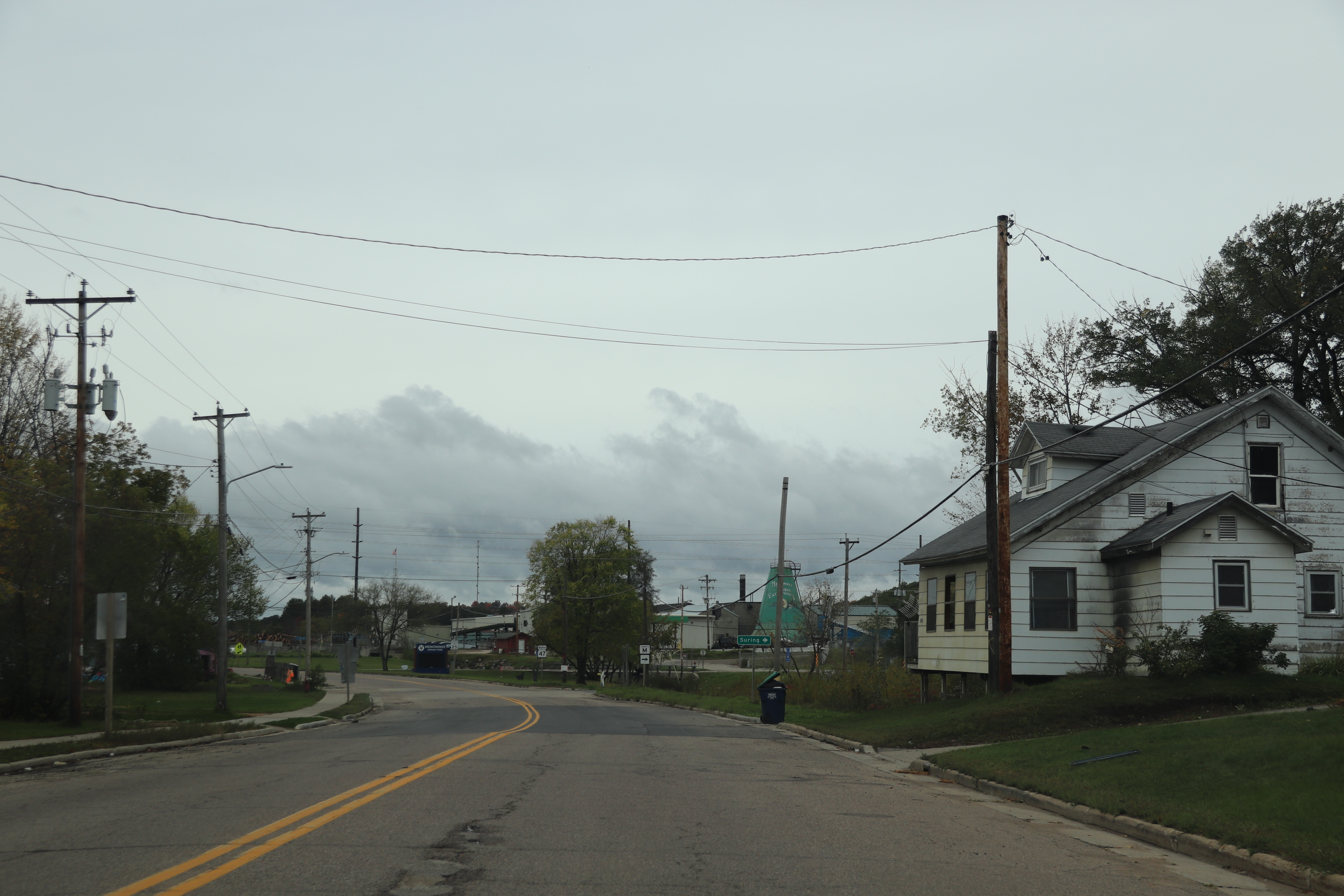
- Wisconsin Highway 47 in Neopit

- Location in Menominee County and the state of Wisconsin.
- Coordinates: 44°58′58″N 88°49′42″W
- Country: United States
- State: Wisconsin
- County: Menominee
- Tribe: Menominee Nation

Area
  - Total: 12.6 sq mi (33 km^{2})
  - Land: 12.2 sq mi (32 km^{2})
  - Water: 0.4 sq mi (1.0 km^{2})
- Elevation: 1,053 ft (321 m)

Population (2020)
  - Total: 616
  - Density: 50.7/sq mi (19.6/km^{2})
- Time zone: UTC-6 (Central (CST))
  - Summer (DST): UTC-5 (CDT)
- Area codes: 715 & 534
- FIPS code: 55-56050
- GNIS feature ID: 1570175

Neopit (Menominee: Neyōpet) is a census-designated place (CDP) in Menominee County, Wisconsin, United States. The population was 616 at the 2020 census. Neopit is located along Wisconsin Highway 47 at its intersection with County Road M, approximately 3 miles (4.8 km) southeast of Zoar. The name derives from the Menominee name Neyōpet which means "four sitting".

== Geography ==
Neopit is located at 44°58′58″N 88°49′42″W (44.982847, -88.828409).

According to the United States Census Bureau, the CDP has a total area of 12.6 square miles (32.6 km^{2}), of which 12.3 square miles (31.8 km^{2}) is land and 0.3 square mile (0.8 km^{2}) (2.46%) is water.

== Demographics ==
=== 2020 census ===
As of the census of 2020, the population was 616. The population density was 50.7 inhabitants per square mile (19.6/km^{2}). There were 209 housing units at an average density of 17.2 per square mile (6.6/km^{2}). The racial makeup of the cdp was 97.1% Native American, 2.1% White, and 0.8% from two or more races. Ethnically, the population was 1.0% Hispanic or Latino of any race.

=== 2000 census ===
As of the census of 2000, there were 839 people, 226 households, and 188 families residing in the CDP. The population density was 68.4 people per square mile (26.4/km^{2}). There were 241 housing units at an average density of 19.6/sq mi (7.6/km^{2}). The racial makeup of the CDP was 2.74% White, 96.54% Native American, and 0.72% from two or more races. Hispanic or Latino of any race were 0.72% of the population.

There were 226 households, out of which 49.6% had children under the age of 18 living with them, 34.1% were married couples living together, 38.1% had a female householder with no husband present, and 16.4% were non-families. 11.9% of all households were made up of individuals, and 3.5% had someone living alone who was 65 years of age or older. The average household size was 3.65 and the average family size was 3.83.

In the CDP, the population was spread out, with 42.3% under the age of 18, 7.9% from 18 to 24, 27.8% from 25 to 44, 16.3% from 45 to 64, and 5.7% who were 65 years of age or older. The median age was 25 years. For every 100 females, there were 93.3 males. For every 100 females age 18 and over, there were 91.3 males.

The median income for a household in the CDP was $27,857, and the median income for a family was $26,447. Males had a median income of $21,083 versus $18,167 for females. The per capita income for the CDP was $8,427. About 24.0% of families and 28.3% of the population were below the poverty line, including 36.7% of those under age 18 and 20.0% of those age 65 or over.

== Notable people ==
- Billie Frechette; gave lectures about her personal relationship with John Dillinger
- Ada Deer Native American (Menominee) advocate, scholar and civil servant.
- Raymond C. Kaquatosh https://www.maplecrestfh.com/obituary/Raymond-Kaquatosh Native American (Menominee) writer, World War II veteran.

== Education ==
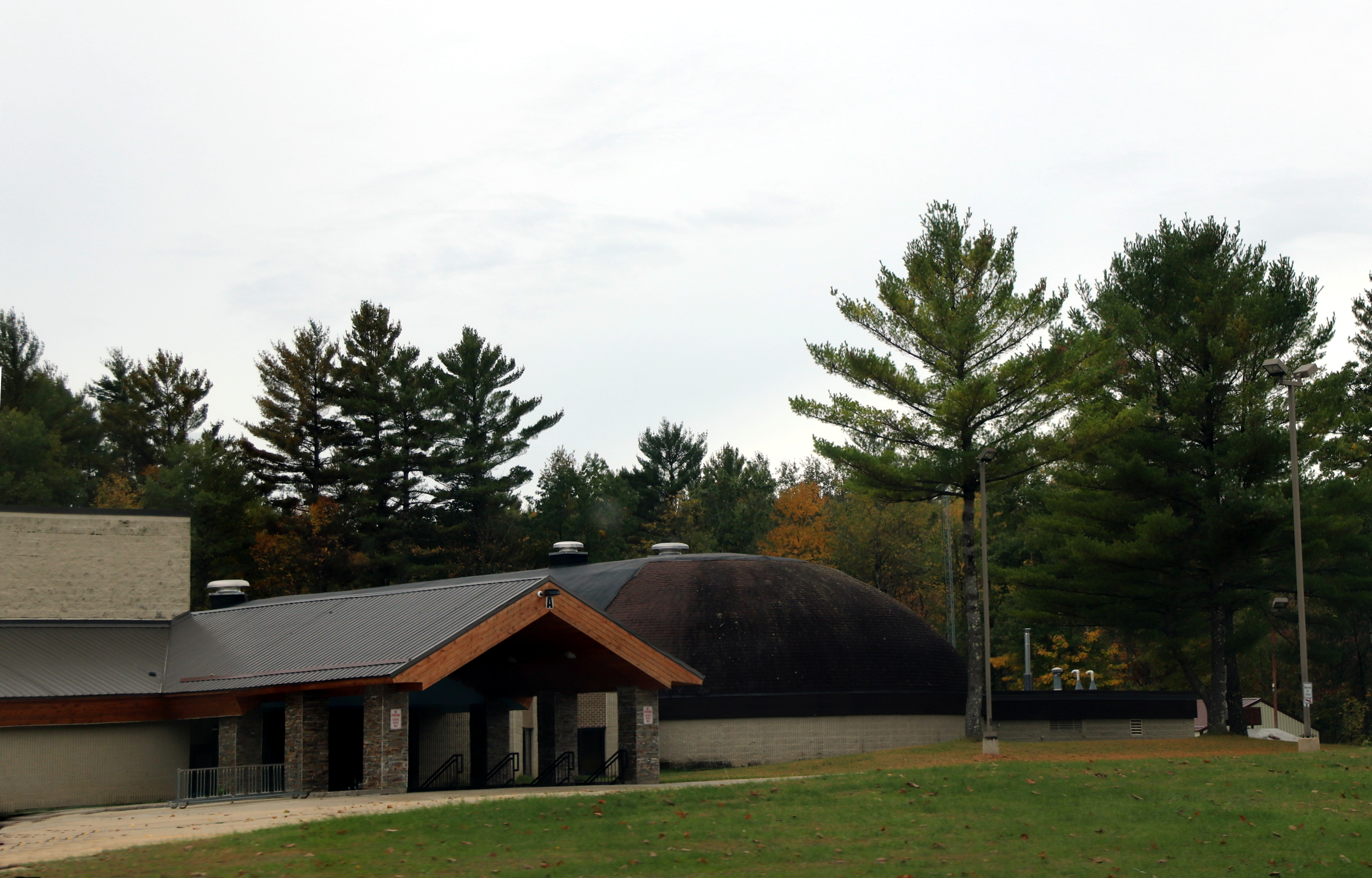
Menominee Indian Middle School

Menominee Indian Middle School educates the District's sixth, seventh, and eighth graders. The enrollment is 180 students and 21 teachers.

== Gallery ==
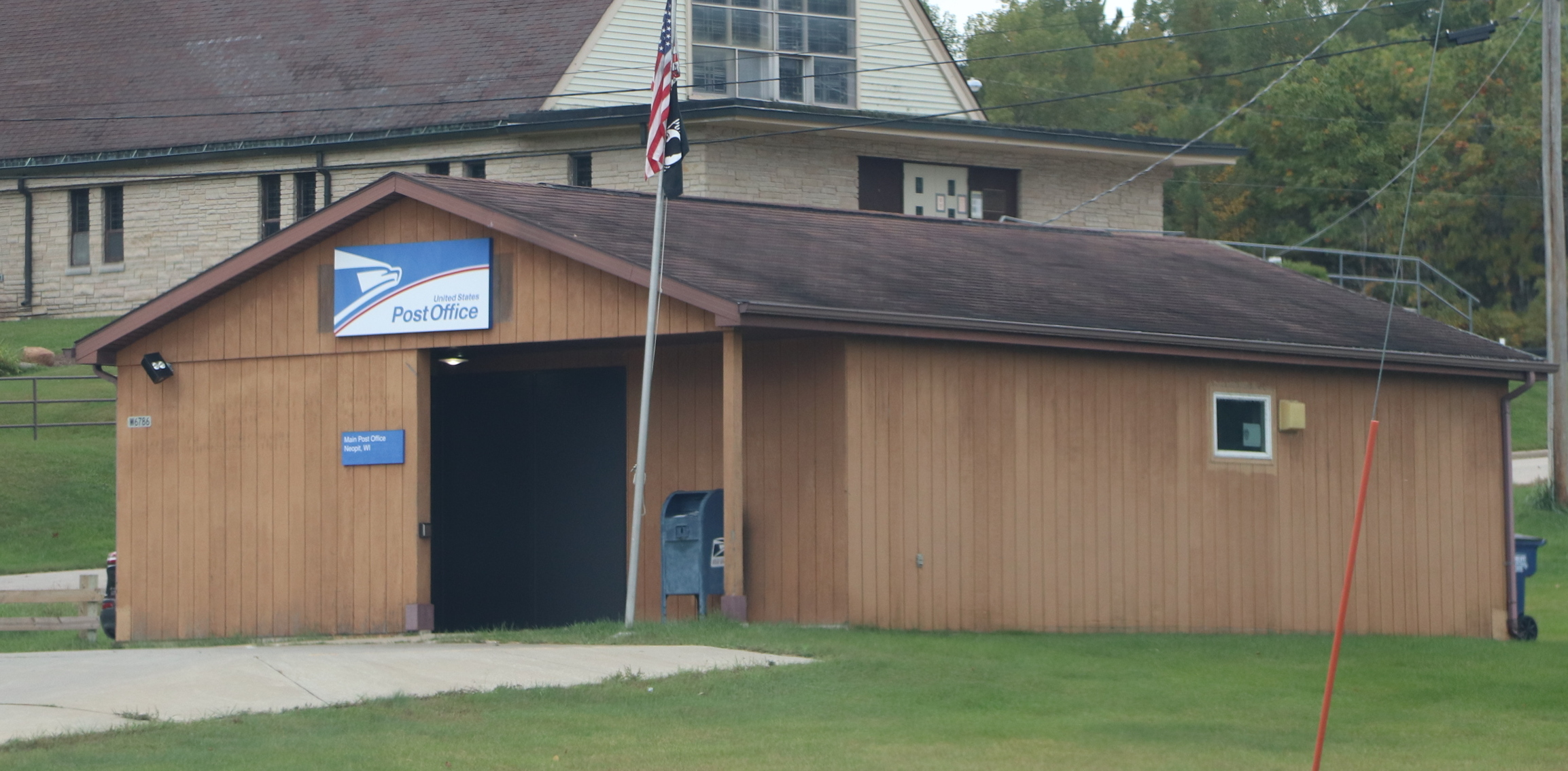
Post office

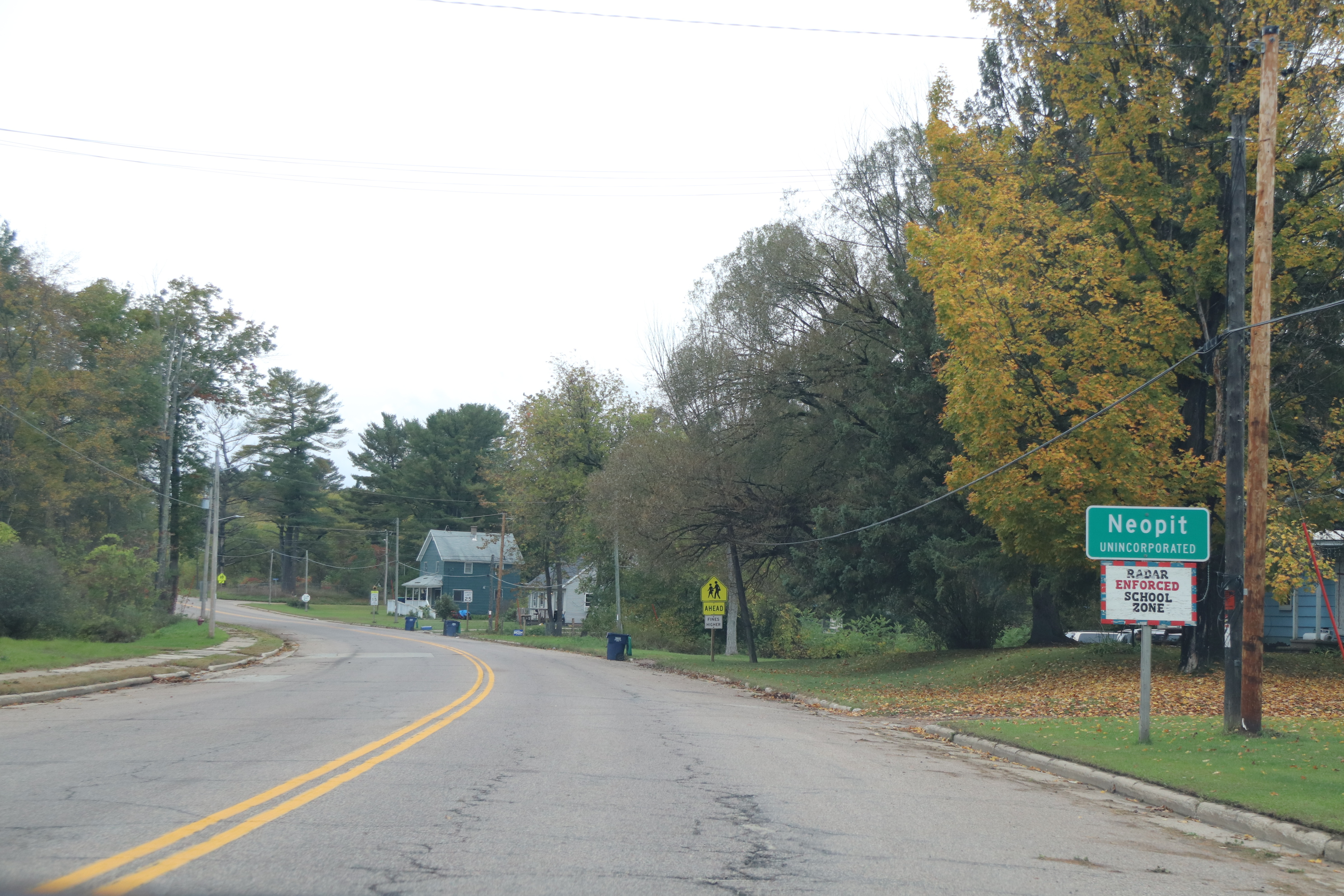
Sign on WIS47

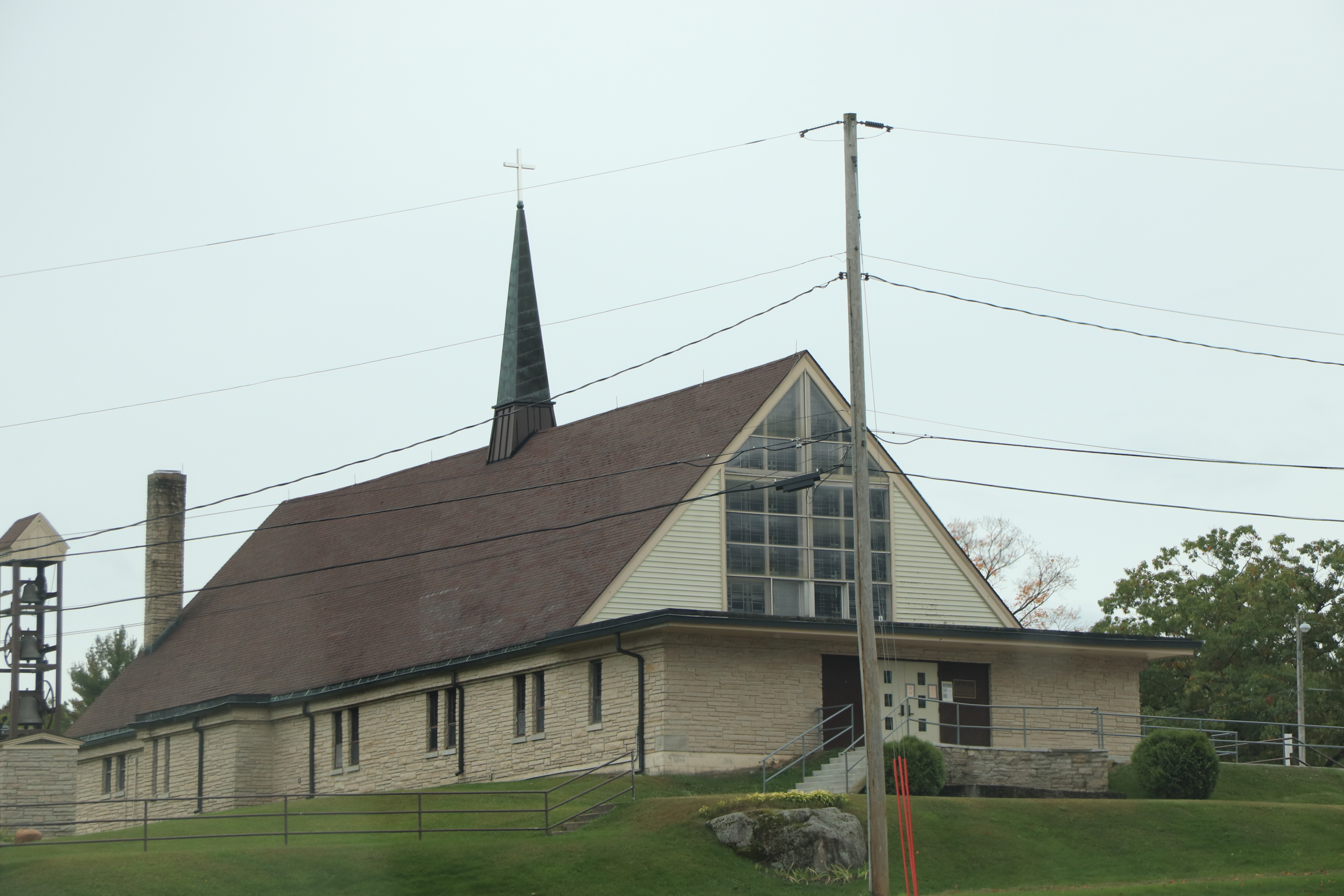
St. Anthony Catholic Church
