= Perote, Wisconsin =

- Ghost town
- Location within Wisconsin
- Coordinates: 45°05′28″N 88°48′46″W
- Country: United States
- State: Wisconsin
- County: Menominee
- Elevation: 1,253 ft (382 m)
- GNIS feature ID: 1831785

Perote is a ghost town in Menominee County, Wisconsin, United States. Perote was located in the town of Menominee, 5 miles (8.0 km) south-southwest of White Lake. The town was marked on USGS maps as late as 1952. Perote was located along the railroad and was named for John Baptist Perrote (or "Sabatis"), a Menominee judge.
