= John F. Kennedy Preparatory High School =

Location
- 600 S 4th St. St. Nazianz, Manitowoc, Wisconsin

Information
- Type: Private, coeducational, boarding
- Religious affiliation: Nonsectarian
- Established: 1968
- Closed: 1982
- Grades: 9-12
- Enrollment: 160 (1975)
- Average class size: 7.4 (1975)
- Campus size: 38 acres
- Colors: Blue & white; black & gold
- Nickname: Royals, Moors
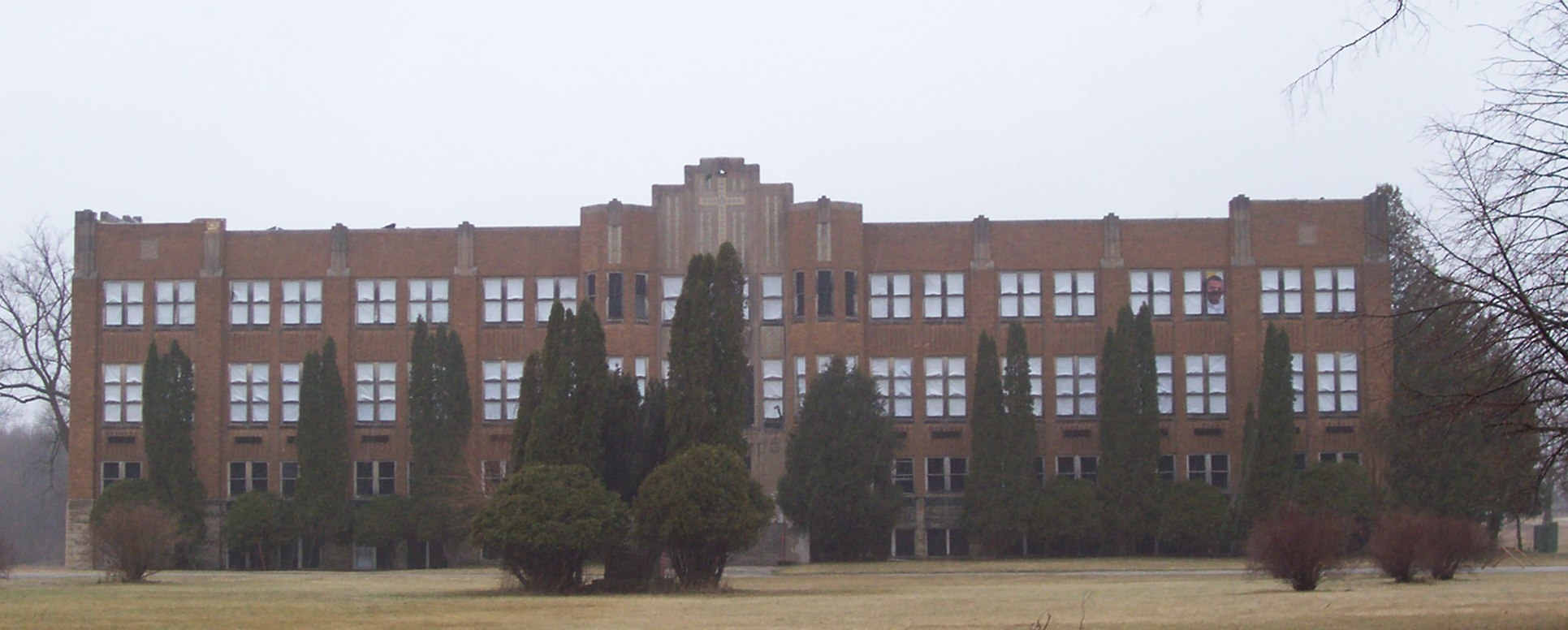

The John F. Kennedy Preparatory High School (JFK Prep) was a high school in St. Nazianz, Wisconsin, United States. It operated from 1968 to 1982. Formerly the Salvatorian Seminary, in 2008 it was acquired by United Ministries, Inc., which manages it as The St. Nazianz Christian Center.

== History ==
=== Seminary ===
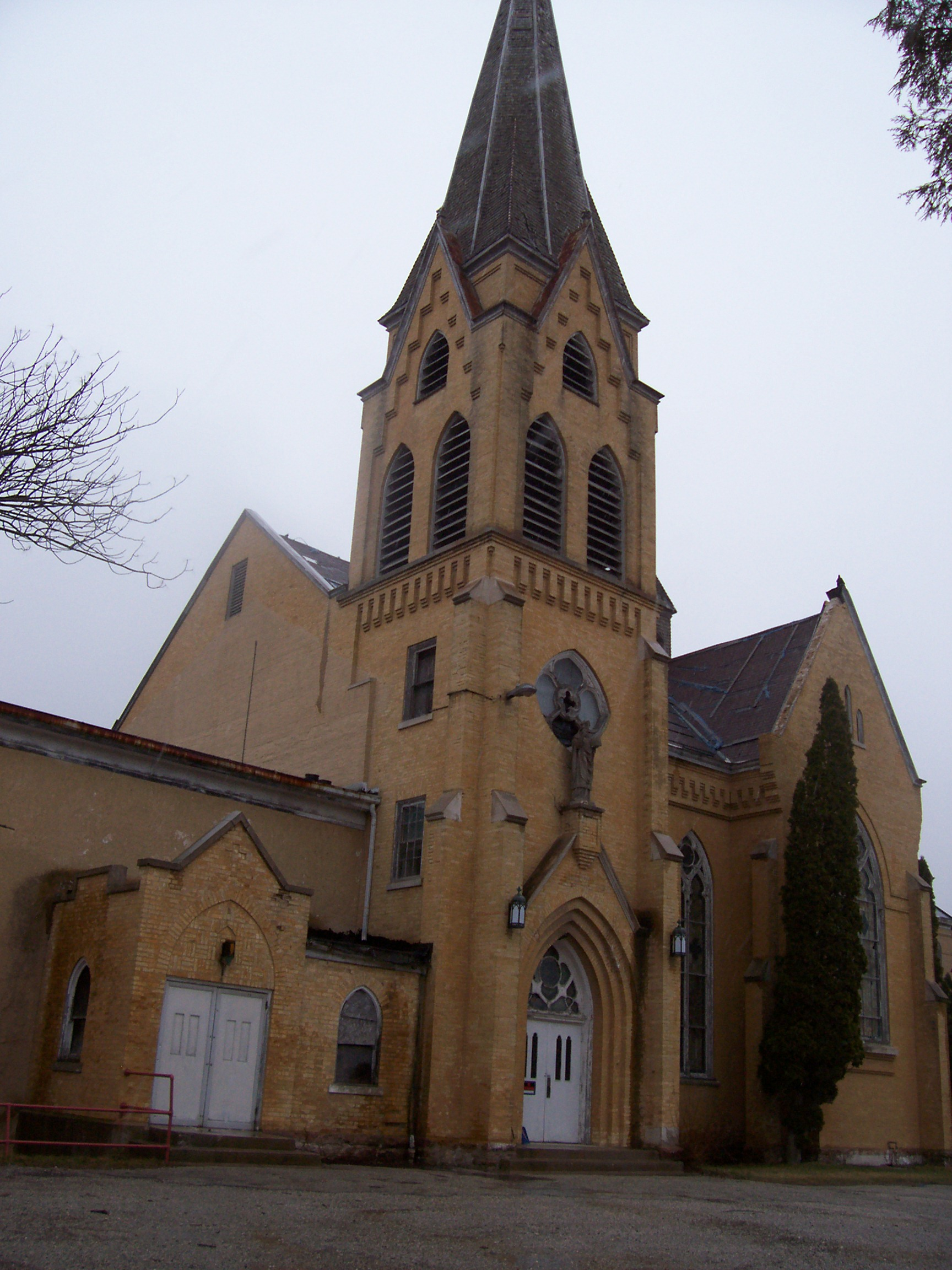
St. Ambrose Church

The school is built on land originally acquired by Fr. Ambrose Oschwald in 1854. Oschwald, the founder of a secular institute, wanted to create a village whose members would observe the evangelical counsels of poverty, chastity and obedience according to their states of life. The entire congregation relocated to America that year as Oschwald believed "it was impossible to build up in the native Black Forest in Baden, Germany a Catholic village and/or parish which would be essentially geared to the pursuit of Christian perfection through the obersvation (sic) of the evangelical counsels by all its members, married, single and celibate (cloistered), it was decided to go to America and stamp this enterprise out of the virgin soil of a newly opened up territory..."

After Oschwald's death in 1873, the community began to decline, and in 1896, after a visit from Fr. Francis Mary of the Cross Jordan, the land and operations were turned over to the order he had founded, the Society of the Divine Saviour, or Salvatorians. The Salvatorians established a seminary on the premises, and had St. Ambrose Church built on the grounds in 1898.

=== Prep school ===
Seminary enrollment declined in the 1960s, and in 1968, the seminary was closed and re-opened as a nonsectarian, coeducational college-preparatory school named after John F. Kennedy, the first Catholic U.S. president. A high school operated by the Parish of St. Gregory, which had opened in 1953, closed in 1969 and many of its students enrolled at JFK Prep.

In 1973, Fr. Melvin Tracy, who taught environmental studies, won $26,000 in federal grants to develop an "ecologically self-sufficient" house, heated by solar energy and powered by a windmill. Students built the structure using materials recycled from an old barn and shed.

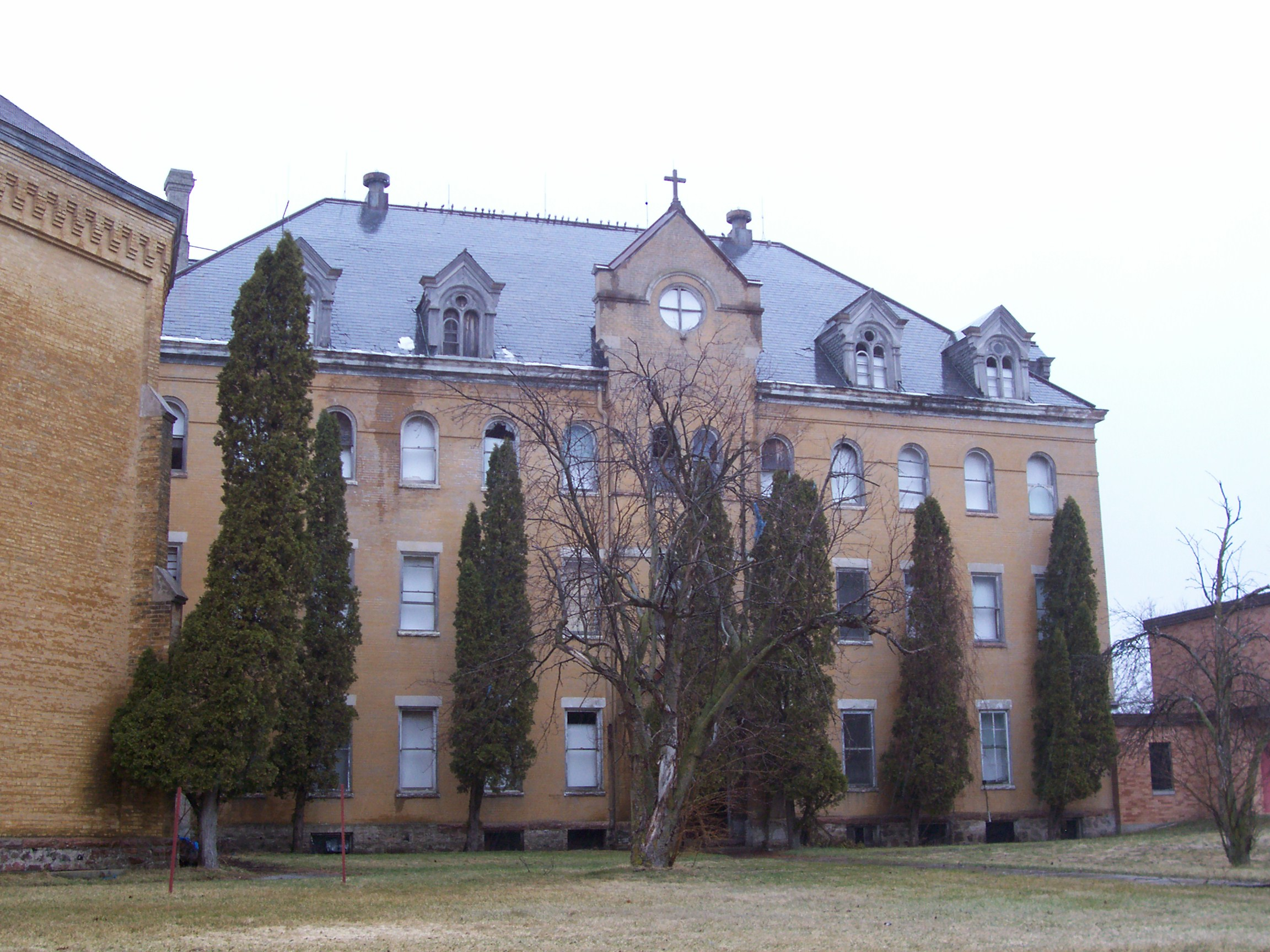
Dormitory

George Hall, the boys' dormitory, was gutted in a fire on April 9, 1975. About 25 students were housed in the building, but most were at dinner in the cafeteria, and there were no deaths or injuries.

The cost of operating a small private school proved more than the order could bear, and the school closed in 1982. After this, the property went through a succession of owners and schemes, suffering from neglect and vandalism. In 2008, it was purchased by Green Bay-based United Ministries, which has been converting the campus for use as a Christian youth center.

== Academics ==
JFK Prep supported the idea of education as a means to self-actualization, and took a student-directed pedagogical approach advocated by James Hanlon, president of Marian College. All students completed a core curriculum of traditional subjects in small classes, but also chose from a slate of unconventional courses covering current events, some generated from student ideas. The atmosphere was highly informal; teachers and students on a first-name basis, and instead of traditional grades, the teacher and student met for an individual evaluation at the end of each term.

Although all students were required to take theology and philosophy classes, the school and curriculum were nonsectarian, and welcomed people of all faiths.

== Demographics ==
The small student body (never exceeding 180 students) was nonetheless very diverse, with white, African-American and Native American representation. JFK Prep drew students not only from the surrounding area and other parts of eastern Wisconsin but from Milwaukee as well.

== Athletics ==
Athletics was not a major part of the student experience. Nonetheless, from 1971 to 1977, the school was home to Wisconsin Hall-of-Fame high school basketball coach Marty Crowe. Hired to teach English, serve as a dorm counselor, and coach basketball, Crowe also coached the nearby Manitowoc Chiefs semi-professional football team, and was once named coach of the year. Crowe once described as "the most non-jock school in the state.

JFK Prep competed in the Wisconsin Independent Schools Athletic Association (dissolved in 2000). The team was originally called the "Royals" with the colors blue and white, but after they acquired uniforms from another school, they changed colors to black and gold and the team name to the "Moors."

== Notable alumni ==
Mickey Crowe, son of Coach Marty Crowe, was a star basketball player during this time, scoring a state record of 2,724 points over his career. Together, they took JFK Prep to the state championship final in 1975, a game in which the younger Crowe scored 45 points, but the team lost to Racine Lutheran High School 72–58.

Ingrid Washinawatok, noted Native American rights advocate (later kidnapped and murdered by the FARC in Columbia), is also a JFK Prep graduate.

== Buildings ==
The former school gymnasium was restored in April 2006. Jim and Linda Frasch of United Ministries acquired the property in 2008 and have been renovating other buildings for use as a summer and winter camp for children.

The gymnasium houses a flea market to raise funds for the restoration. Additionally, the former football field, and several dormitories have been renovated, and a campground built near the lake. The church remains abandoned; however, a temporary roof has been installed which allows it to be open during the summer.
