= St. Gregory's Church (St. Nazianz, Wisconsin) =

Historic church in Wisconsin, United States

- U.S. National Register of Historic Places
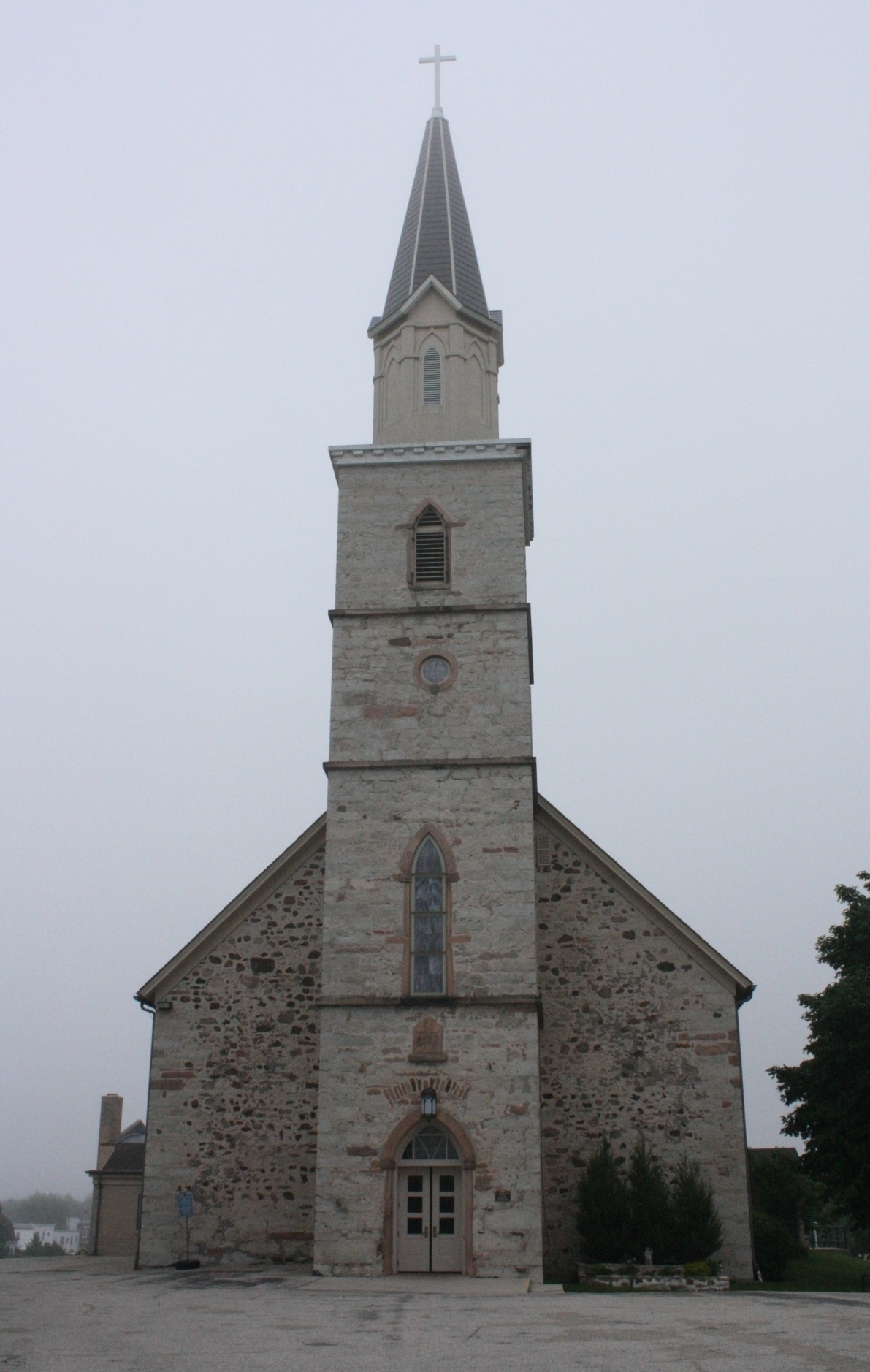
- St. Gregory's Church

- Location within Wisconsin Location within the United States
- Location: 212 Church St. St. Nazianz, Wisconsin
- Coordinates: 44°0′19″N 87°55′35″W
- Area: 2.1 acres (0.85 ha)
- Built: 1864
- Architect: Ambrose Oswald
- Architectural style: Country Church Gothic
- MPS: Colony of St. Gregory of Nazianzen TR
- NRHP reference No.: 82000681
- Added to NRHP: June 7, 1982

St. Gregory Parish, also known as St. Gregory Nazianzen, is a Catholic parish of the Diocese of Green Bay. Its historic parish church, dedicated to Saint Gregory of Nazianzus, is located at 214 Church Street in the village of St. Nazianz, Wisconsin.

== History ==
The congregation was organized by the founder of the community, Fr. Ambrose Oschwald, who left Germany in 1854 with 113 followers to establish a religious colony in America. He developed his own religious rule for the community, wherein everything was to be shared in common and all would work without pay. The community called itself the Association of Oschwald Brothers and Sisters, or simply The Association.

Oschwald recorded the founding of the parish as September 8, 1854, as work was underway on the first church, a hand-hewn log structure that included a residence of Oschwald on the lower level and a chapel on the upper level. The first Mass was offered on October 15.

A women's convent of pink brick, which came to be known as the Pink Convent, was built between 1857 and 1860. A male counterpart, the so-called Loretto Monastery, was built in 1862. In 1865, the parish built a seminary and an orphanage and hospital, later converted to a convent. It also sponsored a boarding school in nearby Charlestown in Calumet County. A parochial school, St. Gregory's School, was built in 1884.

The cornerstone for the stone church was laid on June 9, 1864 by John Henni, first Bishop of Milwaukee. The structure was finally completed in 1868 and dedicated by Henni on November 10 of that year. Soon thereafter, Oschwald commissioned work on the Loreto Shrine Chapel, dedicated to Our Lady of Loretto, completed in 1870 and expanded in 1872. Oschwald died less than six months after its dedication, succeeded by his protégé, Fr. Peter Mutz.

Dissension arose in the community soon thereafter, and legal battles took their toll on membership and finances of the Association. As the original generation of settlers died out, the future of the village, and its parish, fell into doubt. In 1896, Fr. Louis Barth, who had lived in St. Nazianz and studied at the Oschwald Seminary, learned of the Society of the Divine Savior (the Salvatorians) and invited its founder, Fr. Francis Jordan to visit. On August 11, the remaining members of the Association turned over their remaining property and spiritual leadership to the Salvatorians, although St. Gregory's remained independent until 1905, when Joseph Fox, Bishop of Green Bay, invited the Salvatorians to assume the administration of the parish. Care of St. Gregory's School was given to the School Sisters of St. Francis in 1896. The convent and orphanage/hospital was taken over by the Salvatorian Sisters, who renamed it St. Mary's Convent by the Sister of the Divine Savior.

The church was extensively remodeled in 1926, but the Great Depression put a halt to further improvements to the properties for some time. In 1940, the parish acquired the Catholic Order of Foresters building for use as a parish hall. The original St. Gregory's Church and the Pink Convent, which had become too costly to maintain, were razed in 1949; a stone memorial is left on the site of the church. Funds were used to build a social center in 1950, and a new school building was completed in 1952.

In 2000, the diocese undertook a massive reorganization intended to address demographic changes and the priest shortage. St. Gregory shares a priest with the churches of SS. Peter & Paul in Kiel and Holy Trinity in School Hill. St. Gregory's has also absorbed Holy Trinity's school.

== Church ==
The current parish church was constructed between 1864 and 1868 of locally quarried fieldstone. The single-story, gable-roofed church measures 120 feet long by 55 feet wide. The church suffered severe interior damage in a fire on May 2, 1955. It was remodeled in 1958, and the destroyed spire replaced with a cross.

In 1982, the entire complex of St. Gregory's Church, the Loretto Shrine Chapel, and St. Mary's Convent was added to the National Register of Historic Places as .

"The Storm of 2000," took the steeple off the church. Officially a windstorm, many say it was a tornado. After the storm, St. Gregory received a new steeple to resemble the original.
