= St. Ambrose Church (St. Nazianz, Wisconsin) =

Church building in St Nazianz, WI, USA

Coordinates: 43°59′57.9″N 87°55′32.0″W

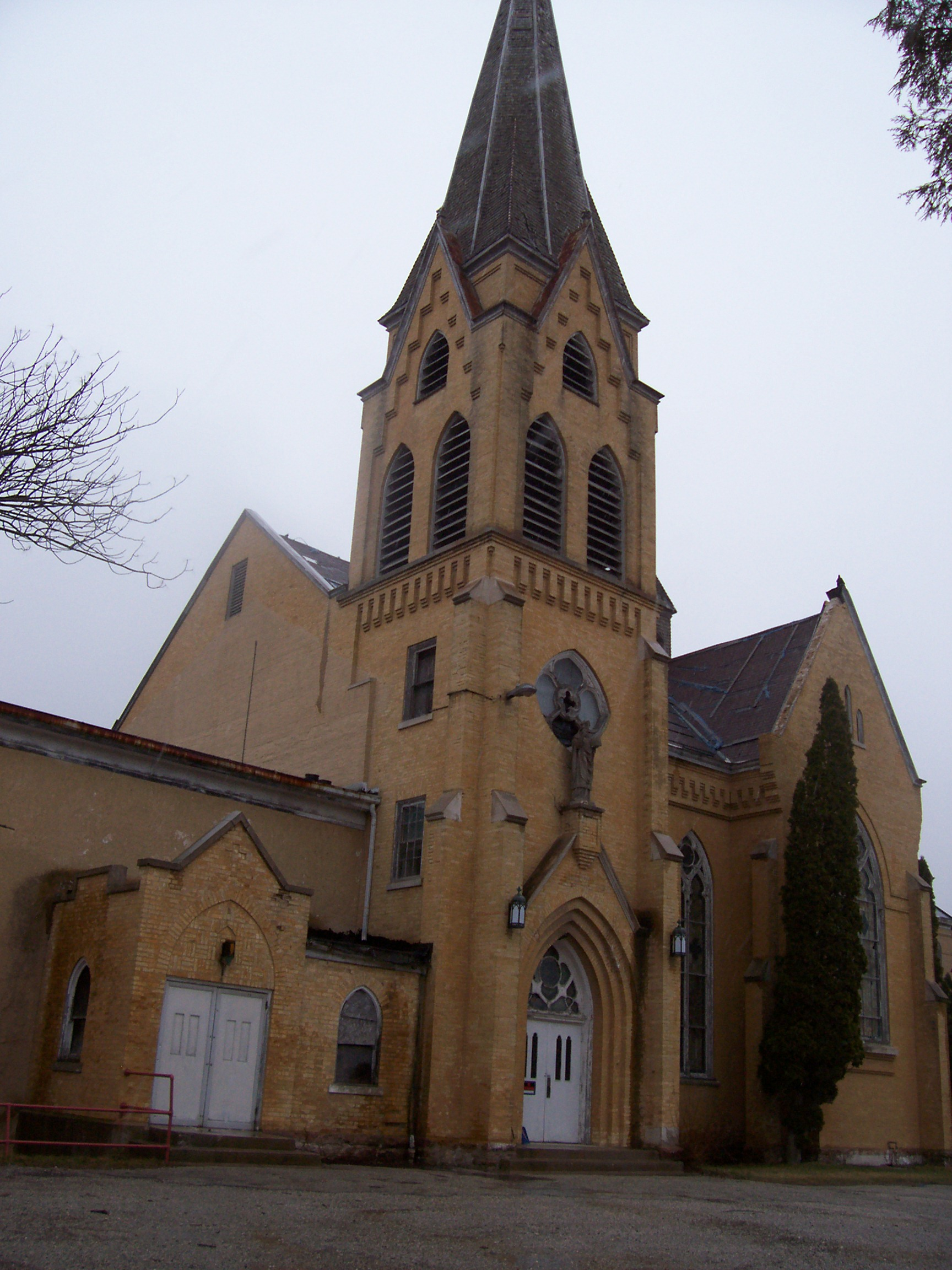
St. Ambrose Church

St. Ambrose Church is a former Roman Catholic church in St. Nazianz, Wisconsin, built in 1898 to serve the Salvatorian center there, and abandoned in 1982.

== History ==
In 1854 an entire Catholic parish in a small German village uprooted under the leadership of its priest, Father Ambrose Oschwald, and departed for America. Arriving in Wisconsin, a scouting party headed out through the forest with ox carts to locate the land and begin the settlement. Property was held in common and the community, calling itself the Association of Oschwald Brothers and Sisters or simply "the Association," was governed by an Ephorate or senate along intensely Catholic lines. After Oschwald died in 1873, dissension arose within the Association, and legal battles took their toll on membership and finances of the Association. In 1896, they invited Fr. Francis Mary of the Cross Jordan, and in August of that year, the remaining members of the Association turned over their remaining property and spiritual leadership to the order Jordan had founded, the Society of the Divine Savior, or Salvatorians.

The community flourished under the Salvatorians in the early 20th century. In addition to the new St. Ambrose Church, dedicated in 1898, they opened a new monastery on the grounds of the 1862 Loretto Monastery just south of the village. Additional farm and utility buildings, a gymnasium, garage, and a chapel for the Salvatorian Sisters were constructed in the 1920s. In 1939, the new four-story Salvatorian Seminary opened, which could accommodate 150 students.

Enrollment at the seminary declined in the 1960s, and in 1968, the Salvatorians reorganized it as John F. Kennedy Preparatory High School, named after the first Catholic U.S. president. St. Gregory High School, opened by the Parish of St. Gregory in 1953, closed the following year and many of its students enrolled at JFK. The school remained in operation until 1982.

The property went through a succession of owners and schemes over the next several decades, and the religious complex was neglected, suffering considerable vandalism. In 2008 it was purchased by Green Bay-based United Ministries, which has been converting the campus for use as a Christian youth center. While the gymnasium, former football field, and several dormitories have been renovated, and a campground built near the lake. The church remains abandoned; however, a temporary roof has been installed which allows it to be open during the summer.

== Architecture ==
The church is of brick construction in the Gothic Revival style.

Oschwald's sarcophagus is kept in the hillside crypt at the rear of the property below the little Loretto Chapel on the hilltop above the cemetery. Originally, Oschwald's body was entombed beneath the altar of St. Ambrose Chapel in the space that now comprises the back of the main St. Ambrose Church (the chapel was the original worship place of the Loretto Monastery portion of the building, a lower stucco part which was constructed in the 1860s).
