= Verna Fowler =

American educator, activist, and Catholic nun (1942–2023)

1st President of the College of Menominee Nation
- In office January 1993 – 2016
- Preceded by: Position established
- Succeeded by: Diana Morris (interim)

Personal details
- Born: July 1, 1942 Keshena, Wisconsin, U.S.
- Died: August 12, 2023 (aged 81)
- Citizenship: Menominee; United States
- Education: Silver Lake College (B.S.); University of North Dakota (M.Ed., Ph.D.)

Verna M. Fowler (July 1, 1942 – August 12, 2023) was an American Menominee educator, activist, and Catholic nun who served as the founding president of the College of Menominee Nation (CMN). An enrolled member of the Menominee Indian Tribe of Wisconsin and a descendant of the Stockbridge-Munsee Band of Mohican Indians, Fowler played a role in the Menominee Restoration movement during the 1970s. She led the College of Menominee Nation from its inception in 1993 until her retirement in 2016, overseeing its growth from a small startup to an accredited multi-campus institution.

== Early life and education ==
Verna Fowler was born on July 1, 1942, in Keshena, Wisconsin, located on the ancestral homelands of the Menominee people. She was the last surviving sibling of the 11 children born to Sanford Sr. and Louise (Pecore) Fowler. On her father's side, she was a descendant of the Stockbridge-Munsee Band of the Mohican Indians.

Fowler was in the fifth grade in 1953 when the federal policy of termination began, a process that ended federal recognition of the tribe and resulted in economic hardship for the community. She later recalled that during the post-termination era, the community became known as "Wisconsin's pocket of poverty." Throughout her grade school and high school years, she accompanied her parents to meetings of the General Council. Fowler noted that while the specific term "sovereignty" was not frequently used during her youth, tribal leaders consistently discussed treaties and the tribe's ability to govern itself.

She began her education at a Catholic grade school and graduated from Shawano High School. Early in her life, Fowler entered a religious order, serving for 16 years as a Franciscan Sister of Christian Charity. She earned a B.S. in 1972 from Silver Lake College.

== Career and activism ==
Fowler began her career in education in 1964, working as a teacher and administrator at various levels ranging from elementary to adult education. Inspired by her mother, Louise Fowler, who held a leadership role in early restoration efforts, Verna developed an interest for social justice.

During the 1970s, while attending American University, Fowler became a leader in the movement to restore federal sovereignty to the Menominee people. She worked as an assistant to activist Ada Deer in both Washington, D.C., and Wisconsin, helping to achieve the restoration of the Menominee Nation in 1973. As a young woman involved in the restoration movement, she recounted witnessing a tribal member destroy a Legend Lake land sales billboard. Following restoration, she held positions with the Menominee Restoration Committee, including superintendent of Education and Director of the Credit and Finance Department. During sabbaticals, she also served as executive director for the Menominee Indian Tribe.

In 1980, Fowler left the Franciscan order to become one of the five founders of the Sisters of New Genesis within the Green Bay diocese. She continued her education at the University of North Dakota, earning a M.Ed. in 1986 and a Ph.D. in Higher Education Administration in 1992. Her doctoral dissertation was titled Leadership of American Indian Presidents of Accredited Tribally Chartered Community Colleges. Donald K. Lemon was her doctoral advisor. She also pursued further studies at the Catholic University of America and the University of San Francisco.

=== President of College of Menominee Nation ===
In 1992, the Menominee Indian Tribe hired Fowler to establish a tribal college. She became the founding president of the College of Menominee Nation (CMN), which opened in January 1993. Fowler set up administrative services in her home's basement and borrowed classroom space from a public high school. The initial cohort consisted of approximately 42 to 49 students.

Fowler built the institution from the ground up, establishing it as one of two tribal colleges in Wisconsin. Under her leadership, the college adopted the messages "Nation building – one student at a time" and "Why wait?". Fowler argued that simply copying state and federal government models erodes tribal sovereignty. She believed tribes should instead develop laws tailored to their own priorities. She expressed a hope that the Menominee people would eventually be as well-known for their education as they were for their forest management. Over the following decades, CMN expanded to a multi-building main campus in Keshena and a satellite campus in Green Bay serving the Oneida community.

During her presidency, Fowler was appointed by U.S. president Bill Clinton to the President's Board of Advisors on Tribal Colleges and Universities in 1999 and was reappointed to the board by U.S. president George W. Bush in 2006. She served as co-chair of the 1994 Land Grant Colleges USDA Leadership Committee, president of the American Indian College Fund Board, vice president of the American Indian Higher Education Consortium (AIHEC), and a member of the Board of Trustees for the Higher Learning Commission.

In 2010, she was a recipient of the U.S. Agency for International Development's George Washington Carver Agricultural Excellence Award for her work connecting Indigenous people in the United States and Latin America through the Center for First Americans Forestlands. That same year, she received the Alumni Achievement Award from the University of North Dakota. In 2011, she was elected president of the NEW Education Resource Alliance (NEW ERA) board. The American Indian College Fund honored her as Leader of the Year in 2012. She also received honorary doctorates from two University of Wisconsin institutions.

== Retirement and death ==
Fowler retired as president of the College of Menominee Nation in the summer of 2016. She was succeeded by interim president Diana Morris. Fowler was a co-owner of the Wolf River Trading Post.

Fowler died on August 12, 2023, at the age of 81. A funeral mass was held on August 17, 2023, at St. Anthony's Catholic Church in Neopit, Wisconsin. She was survived by her niece Joan Delabreau, her lifelong friend Sister Jeanette Trost, her sister-in-law Ava Fowler.
