= Keshena, Wisconsin =

Census-designated place in Wisconsin, United States

Keshena, Wisconsin Kesīqnæh
- CDP
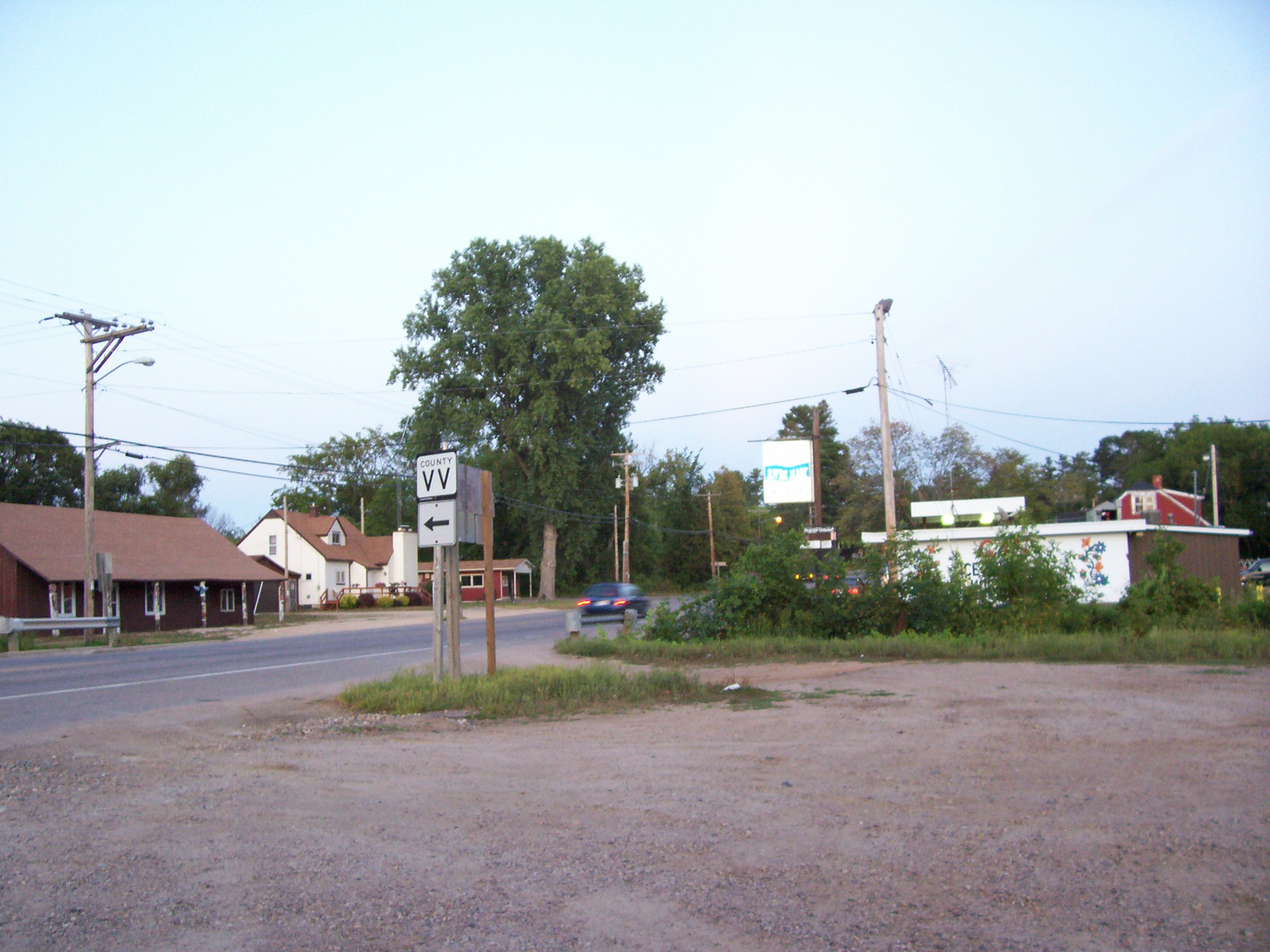
- Downtown Keshena
- Nickname: K-Town
- Location in Menominee County and the state of Wisconsin.
- Coordinates: 44°52′41″N 88°37′44″W
- Country: United States
- State: Wisconsin
- County: Menominee
- Tribe: Menominee Nation

Area
  - Total: 8.5 sq mi (21.9 km^{2})
  - Land: 8.5 sq mi (21.9 km^{2})
  - Water: 0 sq mi (0.0 km^{2})
- Elevation: 823 ft (251 m)

Population (2020)
  - Total: 1,257
  - Density: 150.8/sq mi (58.2/km^{2})
- Time zone: UTC-6 (Central (CST))
  - Summer (DST): UTC-5 (CDT)
- ZIP Code: 54135
- Area codes: 715 & 534
- FIPS code: 55-39250
- GNIS feature ID: 1567430

Keshena (Menominee: Kesīqnæh) is a census-designated place (CDP) in and the county seat of Menominee County, Wisconsin, United States. Located on the Menominee Indian Reservation, it had a population of 1,257 at the 2020 census. Keshena was named for an Indian chief; the Menominee name is Kesīqnaeh which means "Swift Flying".

== Geography ==
Keshena is located at 44°52′41″N 88°37′44″W (44.877932, -88.628781).

According to the United States Census Bureau, the CDP has an area of 8.5 square miles (21.9 km^{2}), of which 99.88% is land and 0.12% is water.

== Demographics ==
=== 2020 census ===
As of the census of 2020, the population was 1,257. The population density was 150.8 inhabitants per square mile (58.2/km^{2}). There were 364 housing units at an average density of 43.7 per square mile (16.9/km^{2}). The racial makeup of the CDP was 96.3% Native American, 2.3% White, 0.2% Black or African American, 0.1% Asian, 0.1% Pacific Islander, 0.1% from other races, and 1.0% from two or more races. Ethnically, the population was 2.8% Hispanic or Latino of any race.

=== 2000 census ===
As of the census of 2000, there were 1,394 people, 353 households, and 296 families residing in the CDP. The population density was 164.7 people per square mile (63.5/km^{2}). There were 376 housing units at an average density of 44.4/sq mi (17.1/km^{2}). The racial makeup of the CDP was 3.08% White, 0.14% African American, 95.98% Native American, 0.07% Pacific Islander, 0.07% from other races, and 0.65% from two or more races. Hispanic or Latino of any race were 2.73% of the population.

There were 353 households, out of which 58.1% had children under the age of 18 living with them, 31.2% were married couples living together, 40.5% had a female householder with no husband present, and 16.1% were non-families. 13.9% of all households were made up of individuals, and 6.5% had someone living alone who was 65 years of age or older. The average household size was 3.85 and the average family size was 4.07.

In the CDP, the population was spread out, with 46.1% under the age of 18, 9.3% from 18 to 24, 26.1% from 25 to 44, 13.2% from 45 to 64, and 5.3% who were 65 years of age or older. The median age was 20 years. For every 100 females, there were 101.2 males. For every 100 females age 18 and over, there were 89.6 males.

The median income for a household in the CDP was $19,792, and the median income for a family was $20,526. Males had a median income of $22,115 versus $20,170 for females. The per capita income for the CDP was $8,578. About 43.9% of families and 45.8% of the population were below the poverty line, including 57.7% of those under age 18 and 32.1% of those age 65 or over.

English was spoken in 84.69% of homes, Menominee in 12.21%, and Hmong in 3.09% of homes.

== Notable people ==
- Apesanahkwat, tribal leader and actor
- Alaqua Cox, actress
- Ada Deer, educator and politician, Assistant Secretary of the Bureau of Indian Affairs (1993-1997)
- Verna Fowler, educator, activist, and Catholic nun
- David V. Jennings, politician
- Marcus Oliveira, boxer
- Sheila Tousey, actress
- Ingrid Washinawatok, activist

== Education ==
The main campus of the College of Menominee Nation is in Keshena.

== Images ==
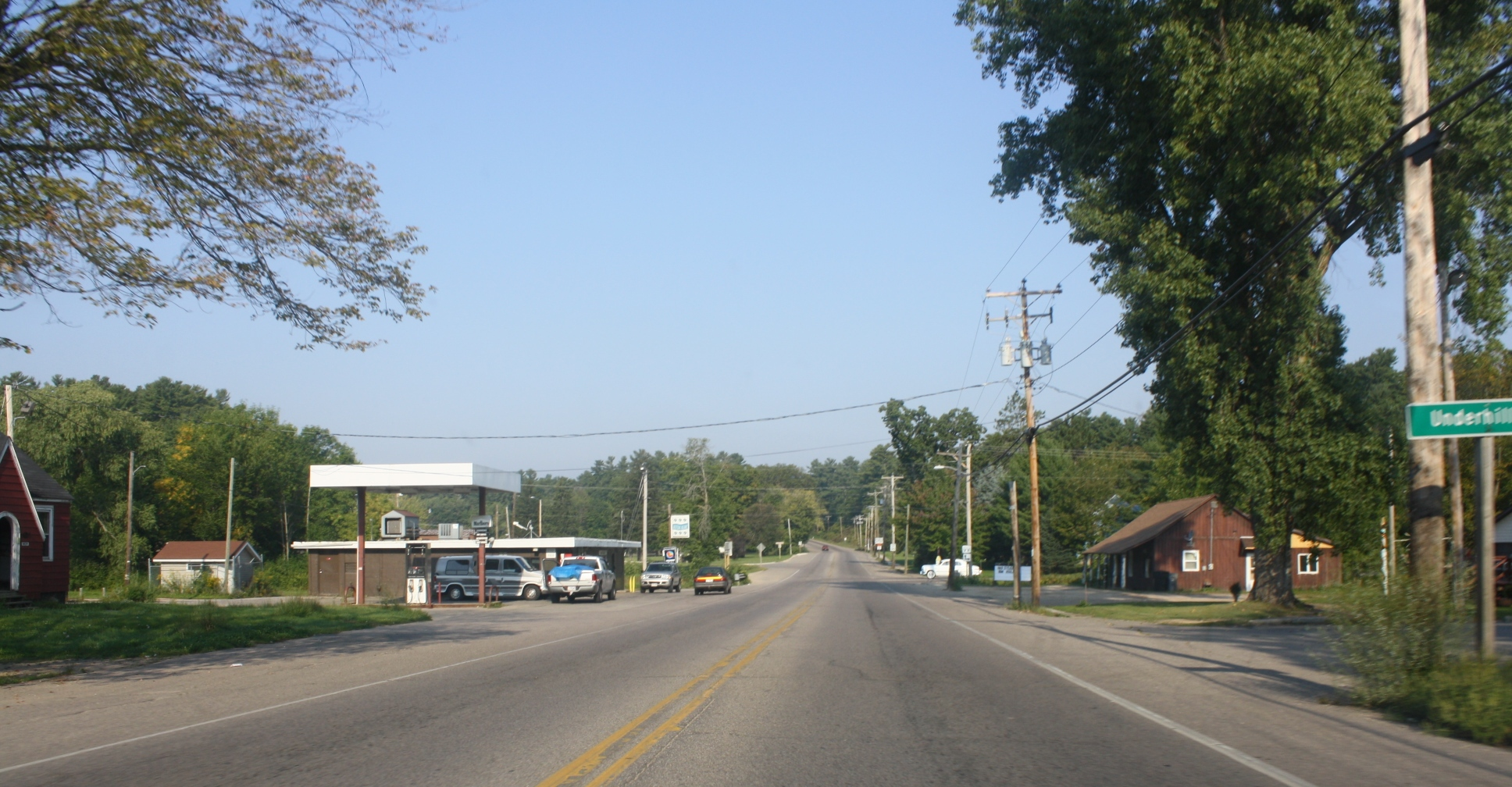
Downtown Keshena

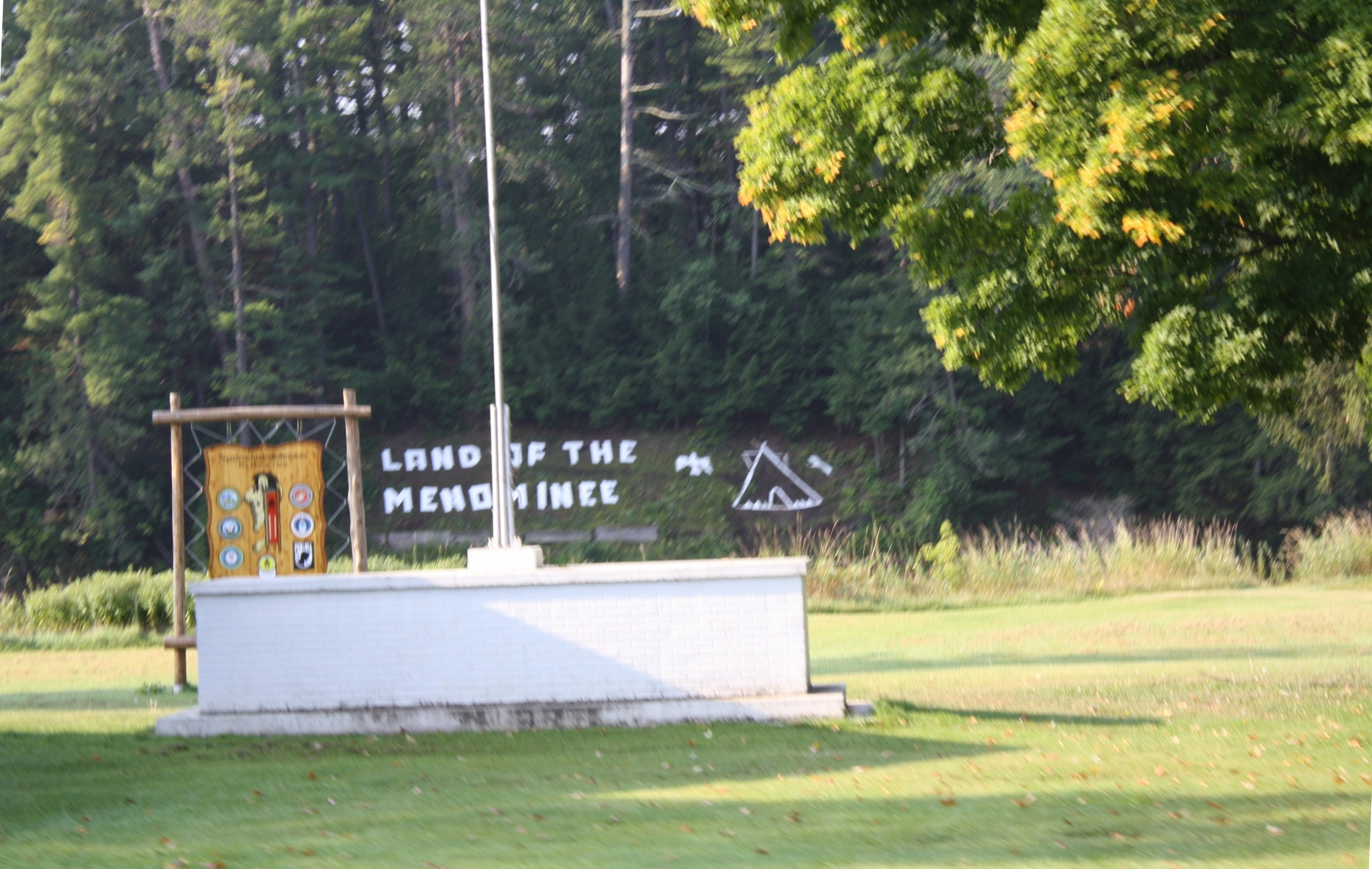
Park

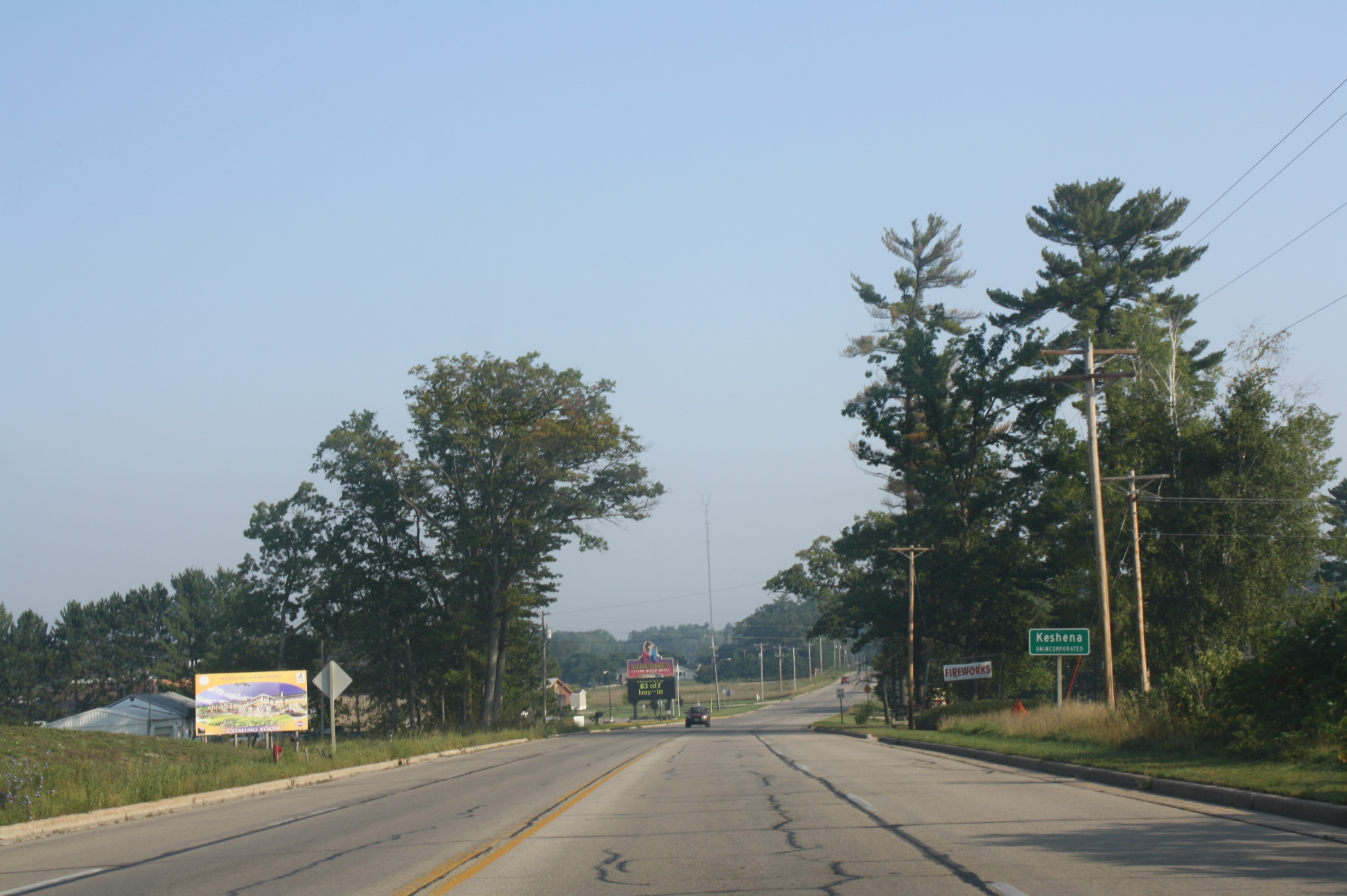
Sign

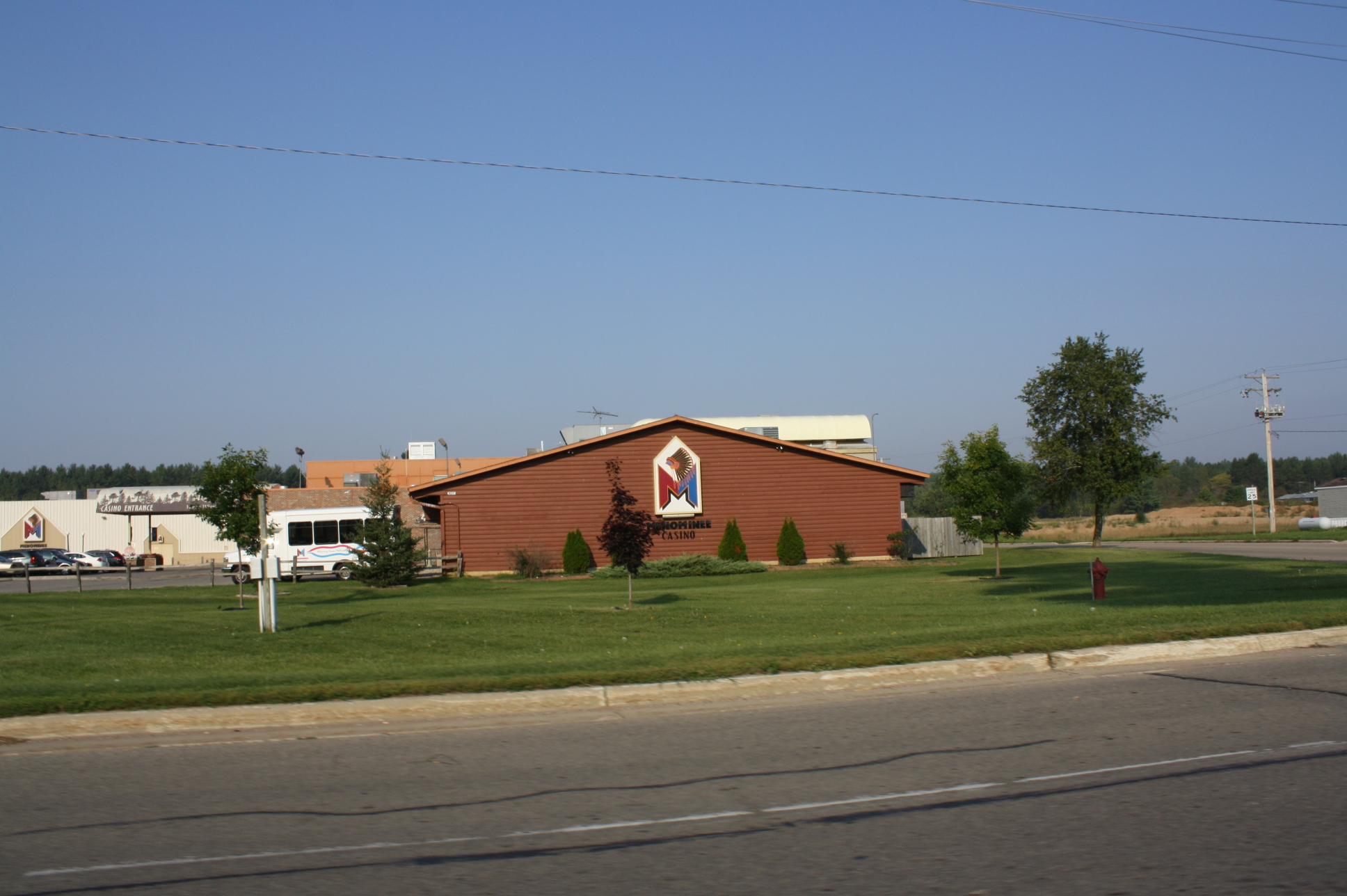
Menominee Casino and Bingo

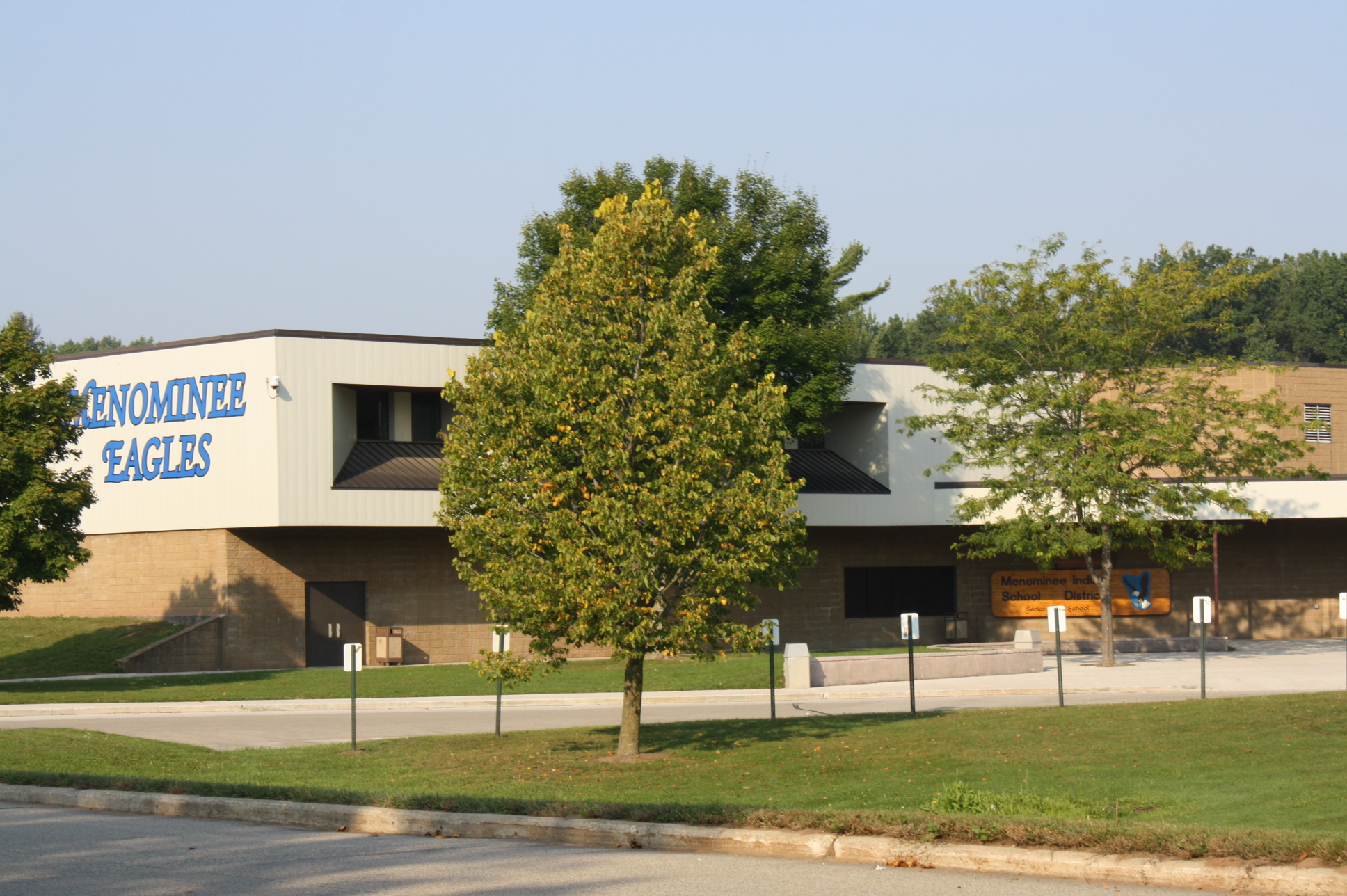
Menominee Senior High School in Keshena

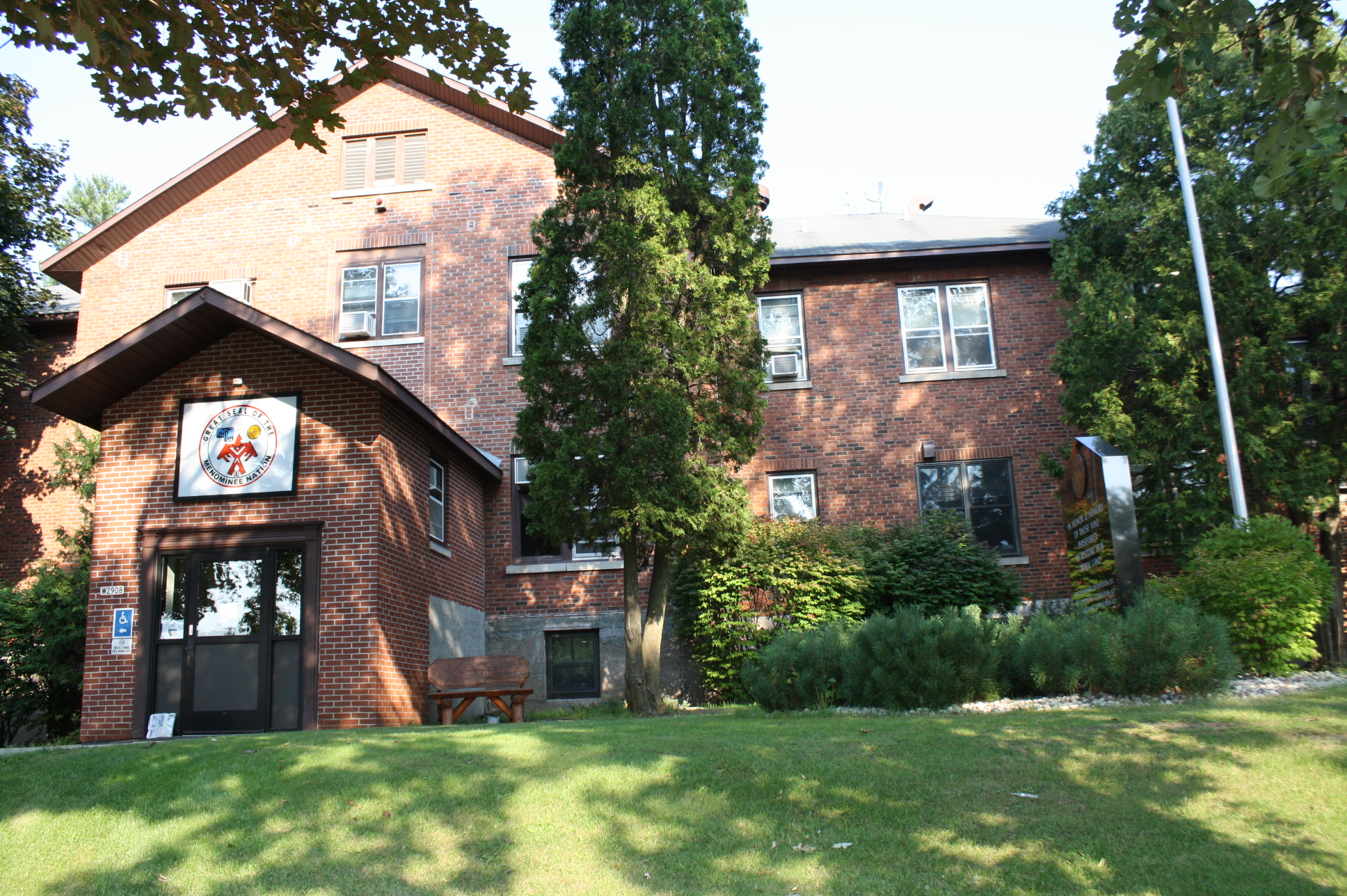
Menominee Tribal Offices

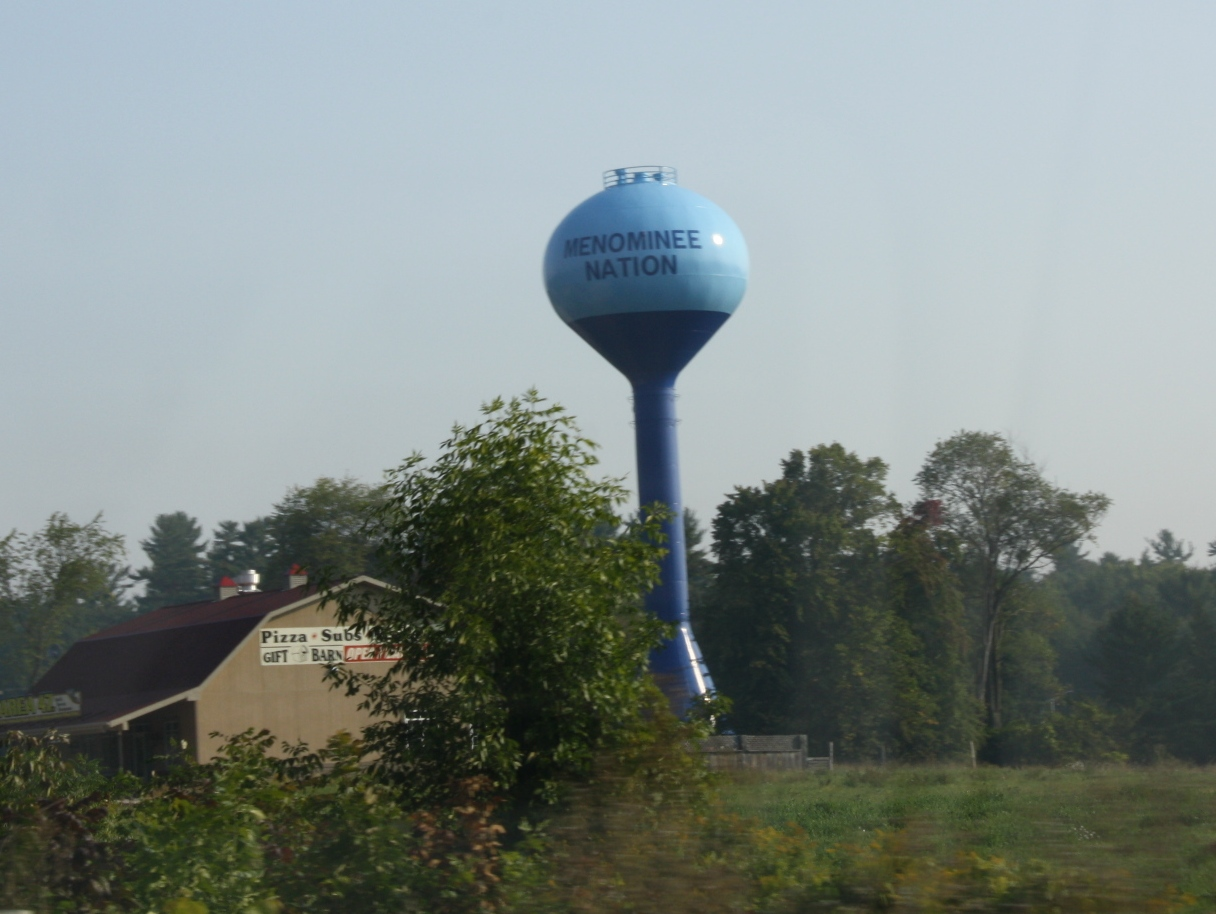
Water tower

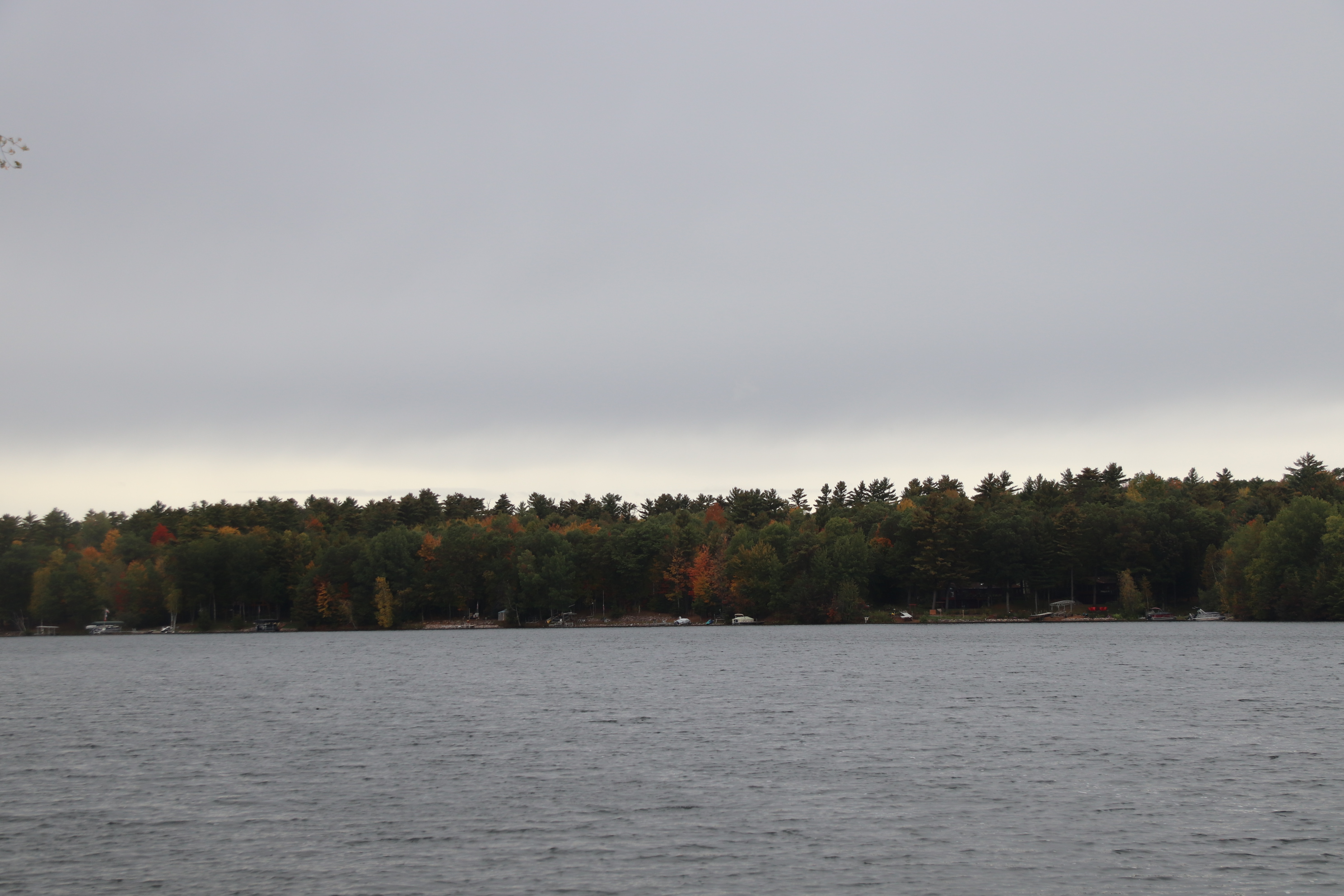
Keshena Lake
