= College of Menominee Nation =

Tribal land-grant college in Wisconsin, U.S.

Coordinates: 44°51′30″N 88°37′35″W

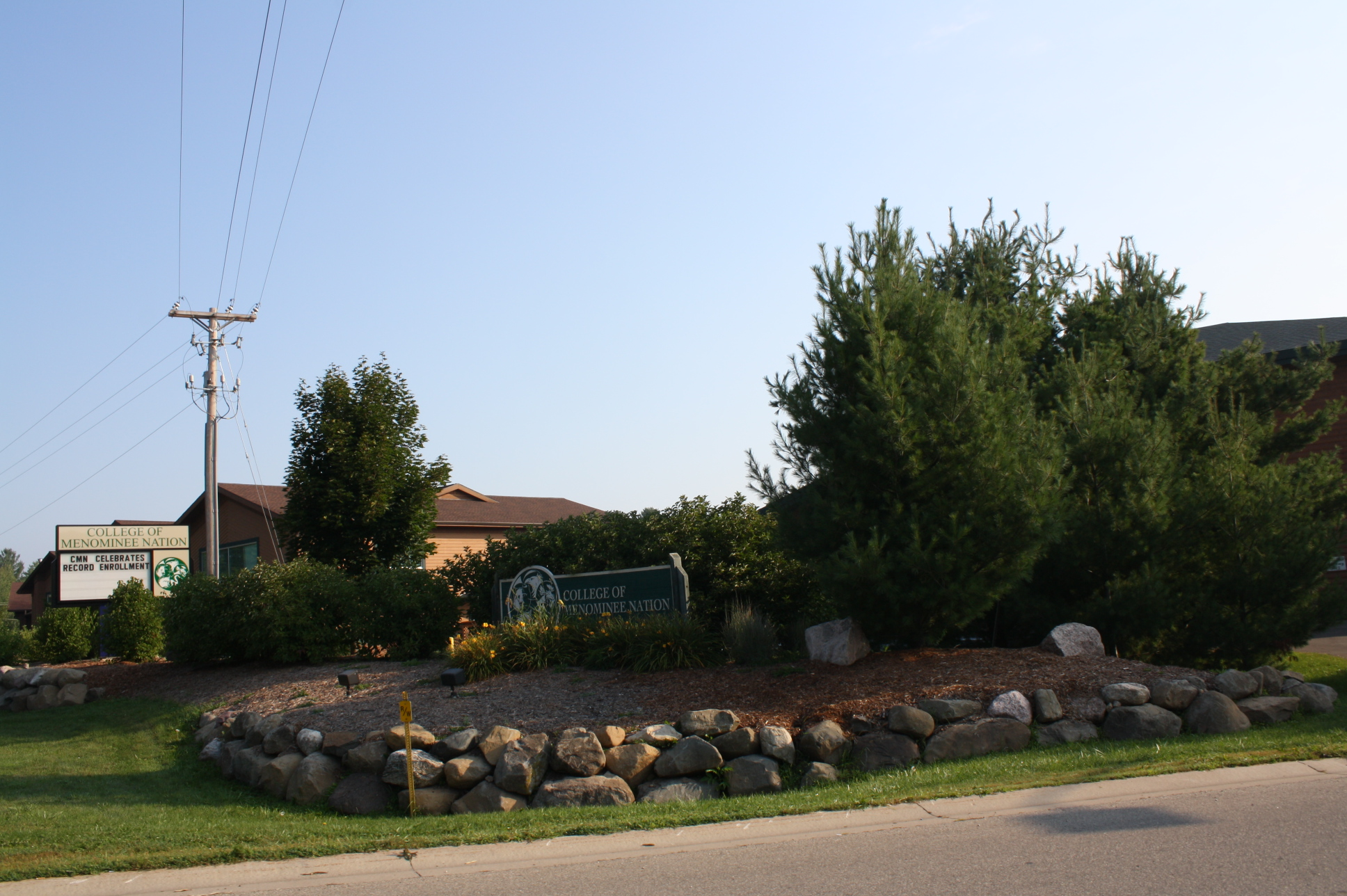
- College of Menominee Nation
- Type: Private tribal land-grant community college
- Established: 1993
- Academic affiliations: American Indian Higher Education Consortium
- President: Chris Caldwell
- Students: 661
- Location: Keshena & Oneida, Wisconsin, United States
- Website: www.menominee.edu

The College of Menominee Nation (CMN) is a private tribal land-grant community college. Chartered by the Menominee Nation, the college's main campus is in Keshena, Wisconsin; another is in Green Bay, near the reservation of the Oneida Nation of Wisconsin. It is one of two tribal colleges in Wisconsin.

== History ==
The college was chartered by the Menominee Tribal Legislature in 1993 and began offering classes in the 1993 Spring semester. The College of Menominee Nation was granted full accreditation by the North Central Association of Colleges and Schools on August 7, 1998. In 1994, the college was designated a land-grant college alongside 31 other tribal colleges.

=== Presidents ===
- Verna Fowler 1993-2016
- Diana Morris interim 2016

== Campus ==
CMN's main campus is on the southern border of the Menominee Indian Reservation in Wisconsin. CMN has a second campus in Green Bay, Wisconsin, which serves students from the Oneida Nation.

== Academics ==
As of August 2014, the college offered 25 degrees and certificates, some of which are part of articulation agreements with Wisconsin colleges to allow credit transfers.

== Gallery ==
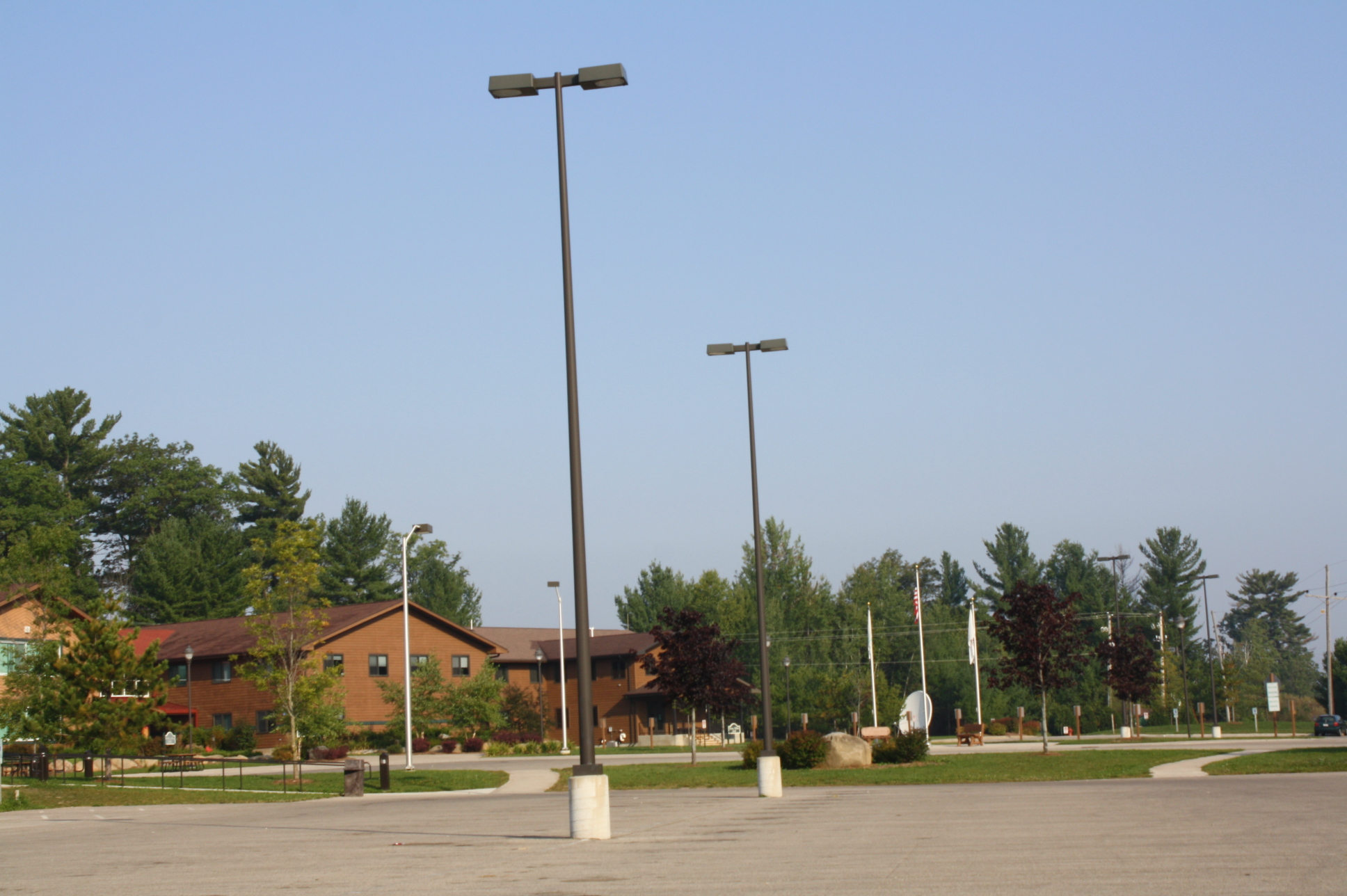
Pedestrian mall

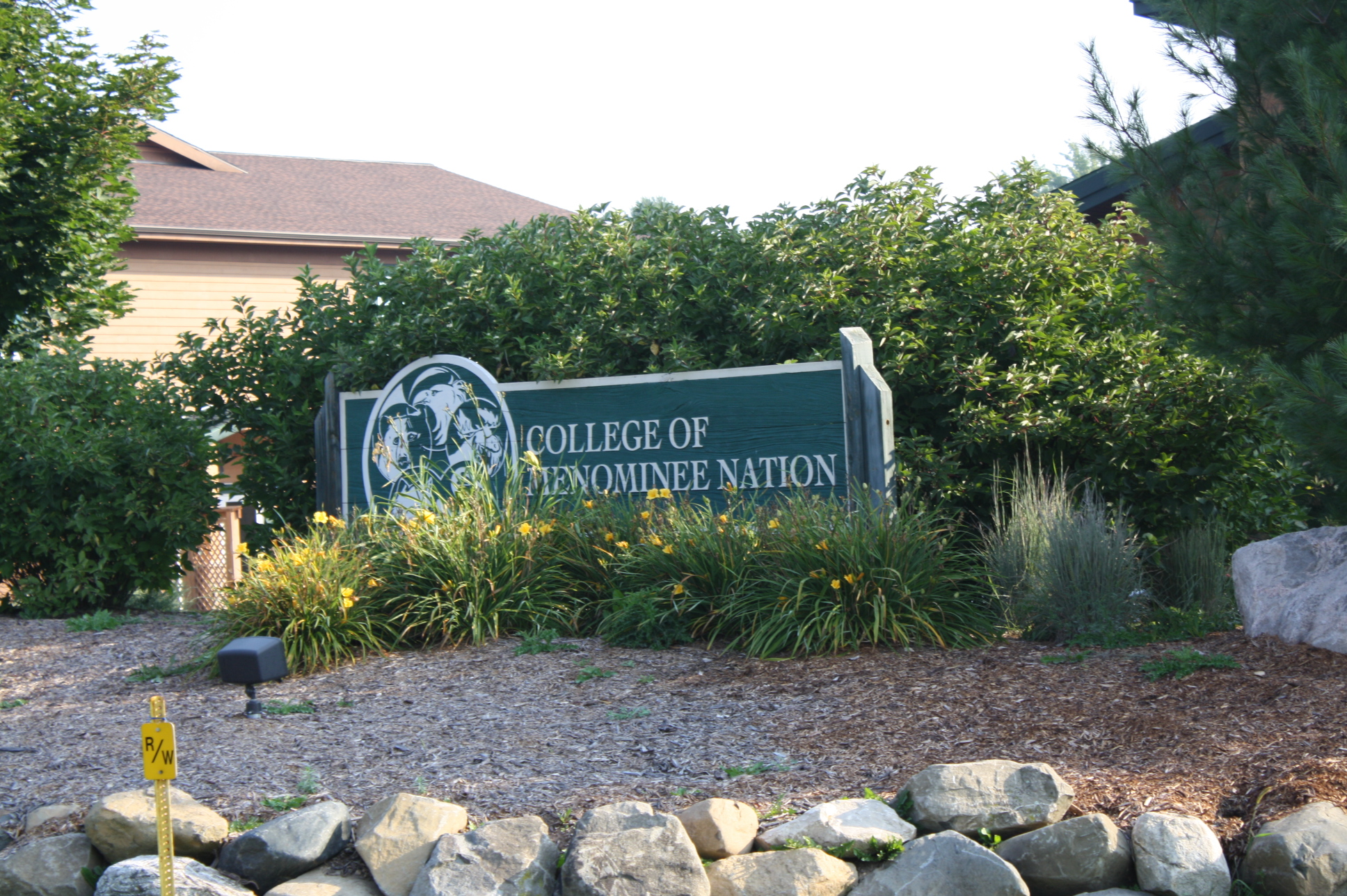
Sign
