= Ingrid Washinawatok =

Native American activist (1957–1999)

- Born: July 31, 1957; Keshena, Wisconsin
- Died: c. February 25, 1999 (aged 41); Colombia
- Other names: O'Peqtaw-Metamoh; Flying Eagle Woman
- Citizenship: Menominee
- Known for: Indigenous rights activism

Ingrid Washinawatok El-Issa (also known as O'Peqtaw-Metamoh and Flying Eagle Woman) (July 31, 1957 – c. February 25, 1999) was a member of the Menominee Nation of upper Wisconsin. She was murdered by FARC guerrillas in Colombia. At the time of her death she was forty-one years old, the wife of Ali El-Issa, a Palestinian, and the mother of her 14-year-old son, Maehkiwkasic (meaning "Red Sky").

== Early life ==
She was born in Keshena, Wisconsin. Her parents were James and Gwendolyn Washinawatok, who created a grassroots organization to restore Menominee Nation land and stop its sale. Her family later moved to Chicago, Illinois, where she and her sister, Regina, attended St. Sylvester School. Ingrid graduated in 1971. During their years in Chicago, the family used White as its last name. Every summer, the sisters stayed on the Menominee Indian Reservation. Both sisters went on to Alvernia High School in Chicago, but during Ingrid's high school years, the family moved back to Wisconsin, and Ingrid graduated from John F. Kennedy Preparatory High School in St. Nazianz, Wisconsin. In Wisconsin, she convinced the family to reclaim the name Washinawatok.

While attending the University of Minnesota, Ingrid Washinawatok became involved with the American Indian Movement and later the International Indian Treaty Council. She also studied at the International University in Cuba, where she learned Spanish and met El-Issa.

== Human rights activist ==
The International Indian Treaty Council asked her to move to New York City to administer its office. She later became executive director of the Fund for the Four Directions in New York, where she planned, organized, and directed grant-making policies and initiated an effort to promote and revitalize indigenous languages and cultures.

Washinawatok was the Chair of the NGO Committee on the United Nations International Decade of the World's Indigenous Peoples, a delegate to the United Nations Commission on Human Rights, an NGO representative in consultative status to the UN for the International Indian Treaty Council, a member of the Indigenous Initiative for Peace, a board member of the American Indian Community House, a founding member of the Native American Council in New York, co-chair of the Indigent Women's Network, chair of the board of Native Americans in philanthropy, and a member of the UN Working Group on Indigenous Populations.

Washinawatok was an award-winning lecturer who spoke worldwide on behalf of the rights of Indigenous Peoples. She co-produced the film documentary, Warrior. She was the recipient of numerous awards from the Native American, Asian American, Hispanic American, and African American communities, including the Asian Americans for Equality Award in 1987; Fannie Lou Hamer Award for helping indigenous peoples in 1997; key to the city from Scranton, Pennsylvania in 1993; North Star Fund 1995 Frederick Douglass Award for outstanding contributions to the struggle for political social, and economic justice; the Thunderbird American Indian Dancers' 1998 Indian of the Year Award; the International Women's Leadership Award of the International Cross-Cultural Black Women's Institute; and a Rockefeller Foundation Fellow in its Next Generation Leadership Program.

"Ingrid was known as a tireless defender of the rights of Indigenous peoples," said Mary Robinson, then UN High Commissioner for Human Rights.

== Kidnapping and murder ==
Ingrid Washinawatok, along with Hawaiian activist Lahe’ena’e Gay and environmental activist Terence Freitas, were asked by the U'wa People of Arauca Department, Colombia, to help set up a school to protect their culture and language, and to help them to defend their lands against oil exploration by Occidental Petroleum. On February 25, 1999, while traveling with the U’was, the three activists were kidnapped by guerrillas of the Revolutionary Armed Forces of Colombia (FARC). A week later Washinawatok and her colleagues were found murdered, their bodies dumped across the border in Venezuela.

After initial denials, the FARC stated that "Commander Gildardo of the FARC's 10th Front found that strangers had entered the U'wa Indian region and did not have authorization from the guerrillas. He improvised an investigation, captured and executed them without consulting his superiors."

In 2003, Nelson Vargas Rueda was extradited to the United States for prosecution in the case. He was the first FARC member ever extradited to the USA. However, the case was dismissed when two witnesses failed to appear.

== Tributes ==
The Menominee Nation honored her with a full warrior's funeral, and she received a memorial in the Cathedral of St. John the Divine, in New York City. The song "Nuevas Señoritas" by Indigo Girls is an elegy in honor of Ingrid Washinawatok and Marsha Gómez. The Flying Eagle Woman Fund for Peace, Justice, and Sovereignty was established in 2000 to strengthen indigenous people's sovereignty by building communities that are self-reliant yet maintain and reinforce their traditional cultures and way of life.

== Quote ==
As Ingrid Washinawatok herself concluded, "From offerings to the black ash trees and sweet grass so baskets can be made for family income, to scholarships to honor the memory of a loved one, to the distribution of meat and fish by the young men's first kill or catch, to community pow wows to send an athlete to national or international competition, the realization of the circle of life takes on an even stronger constitution in this day and age."

== See also ==
- List of kidnappings
- List of solved missing person cases: 1950–1999
