= Joseph Filz =

American politician

Joseph Filz (June 18, 1848 – February 6, 1920) was an American carpenter, merchant, and politician.

Born in Germany, Filz emigrated to the United States in 1873 and settled in Luxemburg, Wisconsin. Filz was a carpenter, farmer, merchant, and the owner of a hotel. Filz served as postmaster of Luxemburg and as county treasurer of Kewaunee County, Wisconsin. He also served on the school board and was the school board treasurer. In 1891 and 1893, Filz served in the Wisconsin State Assembly and was a Democrat. Filz died in St. Nazianz, Wisconsin where he had been living.
