= Loreto Shrine Chapel =

Historic church in Wisconsin, United States

- U.S. National Register of Historic Places
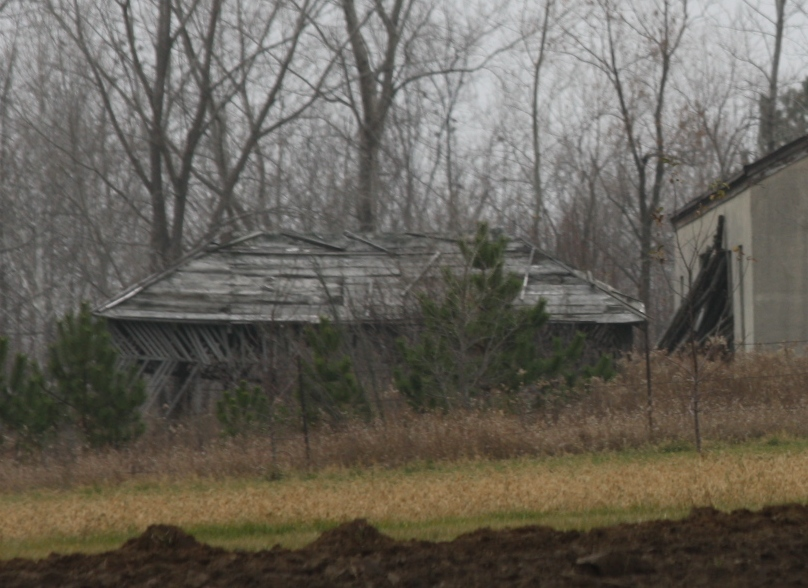
- Loreto Shrine Chapel in November 2011
- Location: St. Nazianz, Wisconsin
- NRHP reference No.: 82000679
- Added to NRHP: June 7, 1982

The Loreto Shrine Chapel is located in St. Nazianz, Wisconsin. It was added to the National Register of Historic Places in 1982.

== History ==
The chapel was created by Ambrose Oschwald, the Roman Catholic priest who founded St. Nazianz. After a storm in 2000 damaged the chapel, it was restored by the St. Nazianz Historical Society.
