= St. Nazianz, Wisconsin =

- Village
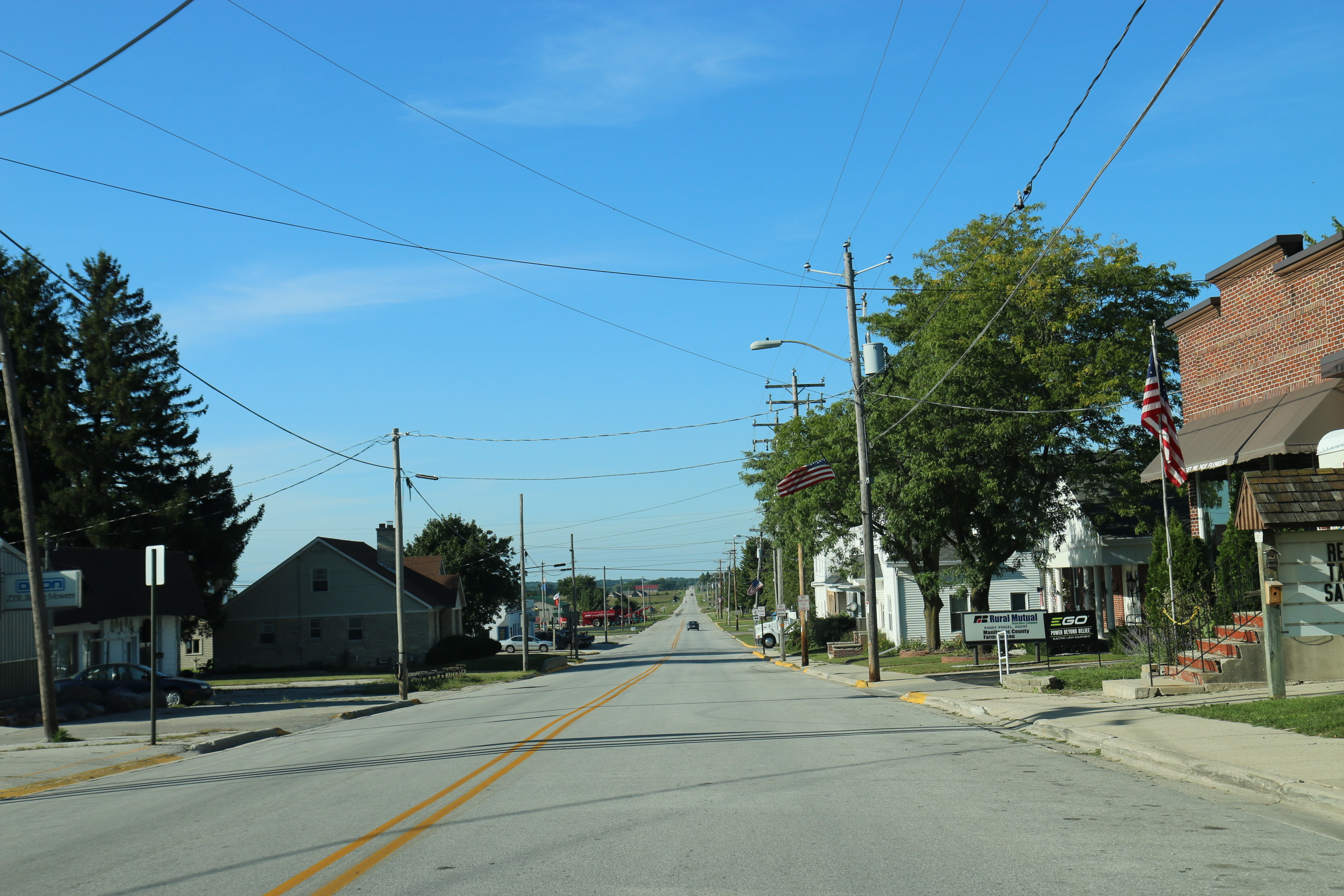
- Looking north at downtown St. Nazianz in 2016

- Location of St. Nazianz in Manitowoc County, Wisconsin
- Coordinates: 44°0′21″N 87°55′25″W
- Country: United States
- State: Wisconsin
- County: Manitowoc

Area
  - Total: 0.81 sq mi (2.11 km^{2})
  - Land: 0.80 sq mi (2.06 km^{2})
  - Water: 0.023 sq mi (0.06 km^{2})
- Elevation: 856 ft (261 m)

Population (2020)
  - Total: 714
  - Density: 898/sq mi (347/km^{2})
- Time zone: UTC-6 (Central (CST))
  - Summer (DST): UTC-5 (CDT)
- ZIP code: 54232
- Area code: 920
- FIPS code: 55-71025
- GNIS feature ID: 1573385
- Website: vi.stnazianz.wi.gov

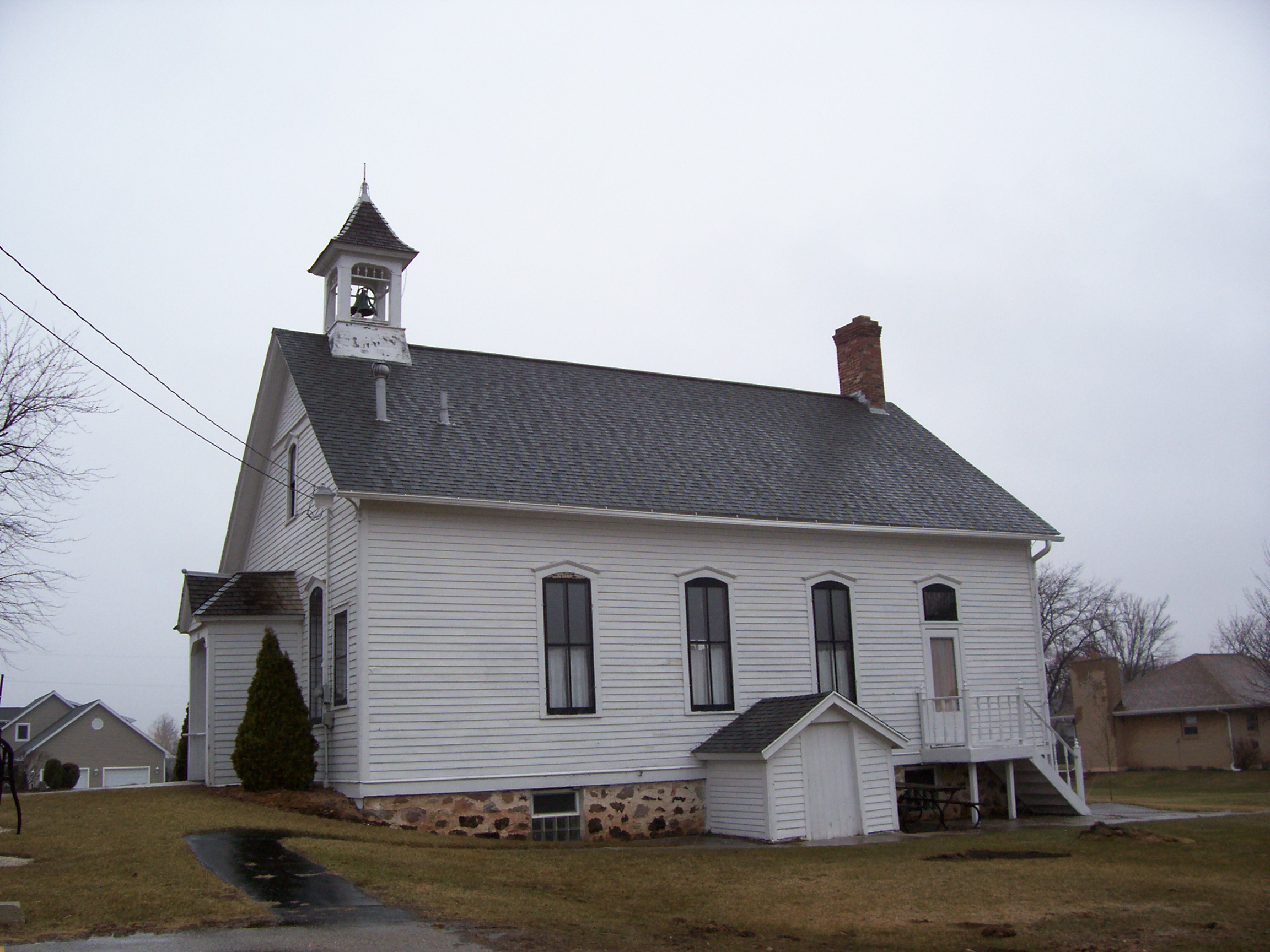
Village hall, a remodeled schoolhouse

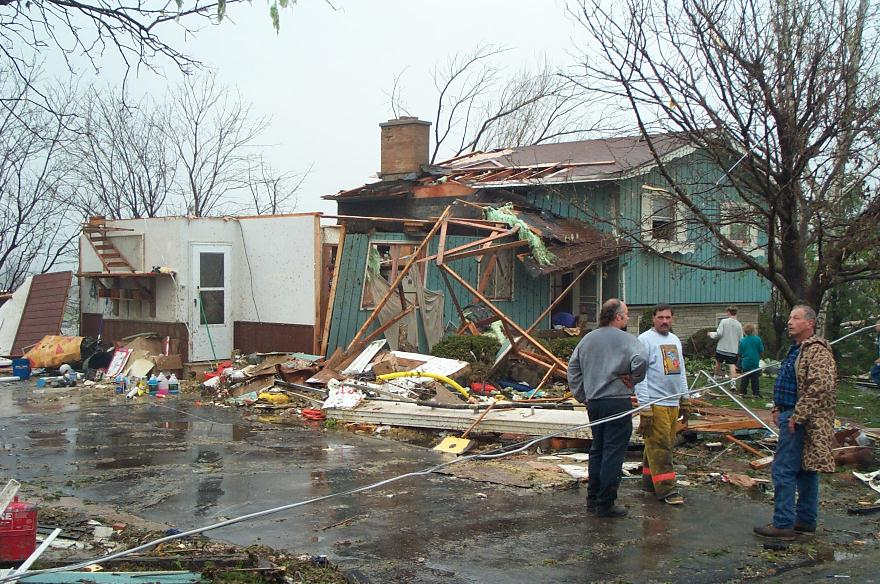
Storm damage from May 12, 2000

St. Nazianz is a village in Manitowoc County, Wisconsin, United States. Founded in 1854, the population was 714 at the 2020 census.

== History ==
=== 19th century ===
St. Nazianz was organized in 1854 as a religious colony by a group of German immigrants, led by Father Ambrose Oschwald, a Roman Catholic priest. The first settlers in the Oschwald group numbered 113 and came to the United States from the Black Forest of Baden, Germany, seeking religious freedom.

Oschwald and his group sailed for America on the Feast of Corpus Christi in 1854, on two separate ships. The voyage of one lasted 52 days, and the other 55 days. By the time they arrived in Milwaukee by train, several of the group had died. Oschwald bought 3,840 acres (15.5 km^{2}) of land in Manitowoc County for $3.50 per acre. His down payment was $1,500, with the rest paid in five installments.

In late August 1854, Oschwald sent six men to locate the land he had purchased. They took a boat from Milwaukee to Manitowoc, the county seat, then headed west by oxcart, getting as far as the place where Valders now stands. They then cut their way through the dense forest, arriving at their destination on August 27. The men named the site St. Nazianz, in honor of Gregory of Nazianzus. Oschwald followed on September 1 with more men, and the group began working to clear the land and build log houses. Soon after, work started on the community's first church, a 32-by-24-foot structure, which was built by hand. By October 21, the church was half completed, and Oschwald celebrated the first Mass.

Settlers began going by the name "The Association" and agreed to share everything in common and work without pay. That arrangement continued until 1896. The group built shops and mills and the community was thriving within just a few years of its start. People began practicing trades, including blacksmithing, carpentry, masonry, shoemaking, woodworking, tailoring, barrel making, rope making, tanning, weaving, brick-making, baking soda, and brewing.

In the ensuing years, Oschwald helped start several religious organizations, including the Oschwald Brothers and the Franciscan Sisters of Christian Charity. Oschwald died on February 27, 1873, and was buried under the altar at the old St. Ambrose Church at the Loreto Monastery. Several years later his body was moved to a shrine near Loreto Shrine Chapel in the village.

The Salvatorian priests and brothers came to St. Nazianz in 1896, 15 years after the Society of the Divine Savior was founded by Father Francis Mary of the Cross Jordan in Italy. The Salvatorian priests and brothers and the Salvatorian sisters worked to improve the holding of the former association and built St. Ambrose Church in 1898.

=== 2000 weather incident ===
Shortly before noon on May 12, 2000, St. Nazianz and surrounding communities were hit by a severe storm that caused major damage. The storm was initially considered a tornado but was later declared a "thunderstorm super cell moist microburst" by meteorologists. It was reported that the storm produced 120 mph (190 km/h) straight line winds. The National Weather Service reported that at least 75 mph (121 km/h) wind gusts were achieved. Residents who were in St. Nazianz as the storm hit said that it went from noon light to midnight darkness in a matter of seconds.

The storm roughly followed U.S. Route 151, with St. Nazianz and Chilton receiving the worst of the damage, caused largely by wind and hail. The hail ranged from golf ball-size to baseball-size. Many houses were destroyed by the storm, while others sustained major damage. Many cars were totaled or needed hail damage repair. The total damage caused by this storm to St. Nazianz and surrounding areas was estimated at $122 million. It was the state's first storm to exceed $100 million in damage. No casualties were caused by the storm. The village has since recovered considerably.

== Geography ==
St. Nazianz is located at 44°0′21″N 87°55′25″W (44.005717, -87.923604).

According to the United States Census Bureau, the village has a total area of 0.85 square miles (2.20 km^{2}), of which 0.83 square miles (2.15 km^{2}) is land and 0.02 square miles (0.05 km^{2}) is water.

St. Nazianz is accessible to I-43 exit 144, WIS 42, and WIS 67 by County Highway C, and accessible to U.S. 151 by County Highway A.

== Demographics ==
Historical population
Census	Pop.	Note	%±
1960	669		—
1970	718		7.3%
1980	738		2.8%
1990	693		−6.1%
2000	749		8.1%
2010	783		4.5%
2020	714		−8.8%
U.S. Decennial Census

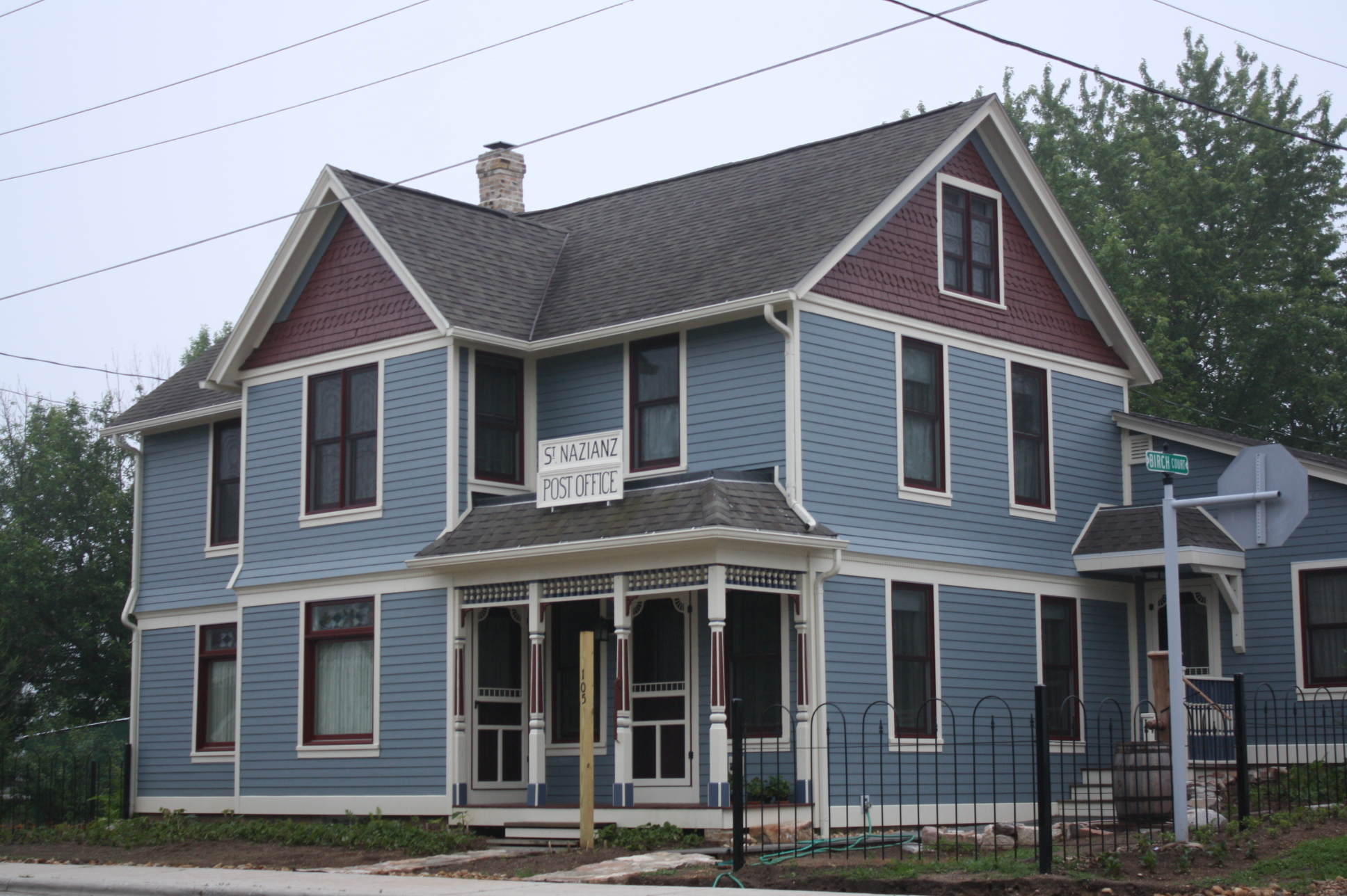
Post office

=== 2010 census ===
As of the census of 2010, there were 783 people, 324 households, and 209 families residing in the village. The population density was 943.4 inhabitants per square mile (364.2/km^{2}). There were 346 housing units at an average density of 416.9 per square mile (161.0/km^{2}). The racial makeup of the village was 97.1% White, 0.1% Native American, 1.1% Asian, 0.9% from other races, and 0.8% from two or more races. Hispanic or Latino people of any race were 1.7% of the population.

There were 324 households, of which 30.6% had children under the age of 18 living with them, 49.7% were married couples living together, 9.0% had a female householder with no husband present, 5.9% had a male householder with no wife present, and 35.5% were non-families. 28.7% of all households were made up of individuals, and 14.8% had someone living alone who was 65 years of age or older. The average household size was 2.42 and the average family size was 2.97.

The median age in the village was 41.8 years. 22.7% of residents were under the age of 18; 6.9% were between the ages of 18 and 24; 27.7% were from 25 to 44; 27.2% were from 45 to 64; and 15.5% were 65 years of age or older. The gender makeup of the village was 50.2% male and 49.8% female.

=== 2000 census ===
As of the census of 2000, there were 749 people, 296 households, and 197 families residing in the village. The population density was 907.6 people per square mile (348.4/km^{2}). There were 302 housing units at an average density of 365.9 per square mile (140.5/km^{2}). The racial makeup of the village was 96.80% White, 0.13% African American, 0.13% Native American, 0.13% Asian, 0.53% from other races, and 2.27% from two or more races. Hispanic or Latino people of any race were 2.27% of the population.

There were 296 households, out of which 35.1% had children under the age of 18 living with them, 53.4% were married couples living together, 6.8% had a female householder with no husband present, and 33.4% were non-families. 25.7% of all households were made up of individuals, and 10.8% had someone living alone who was 65 years of age or older. The average household size was 2.50 and the average family size was 3.09.

In the village, the population was spread out, with 28.2% under the age of 18, 7.2% from 18 to 24, 29.5% from 25 to 44, 20.2% from 45 to 64, and 15.0% who were 65 years of age or older. The median age was 35 years. For every 100 females, there were 103.0 males. For every 100 females age 18 and over, there were 107.7 males.

The median income for a household in the village was $40,139, and the median income for a family was $43,750. Males had a median income of $35,341 versus $22,917 for females. The per capita income for the village was $16,989. About 3.9% of families and 5.3% of the population were below the poverty line, including 4.1% of those under age 18 and 15.4% of those age 65 or over.

== Notable people ==
- Joseph Filz, Wisconsin State Representative; lived in St. Nazianz
- Victor A. Miller, Attorney General of Wisconsin; lived in St. Nazianz

== Images ==
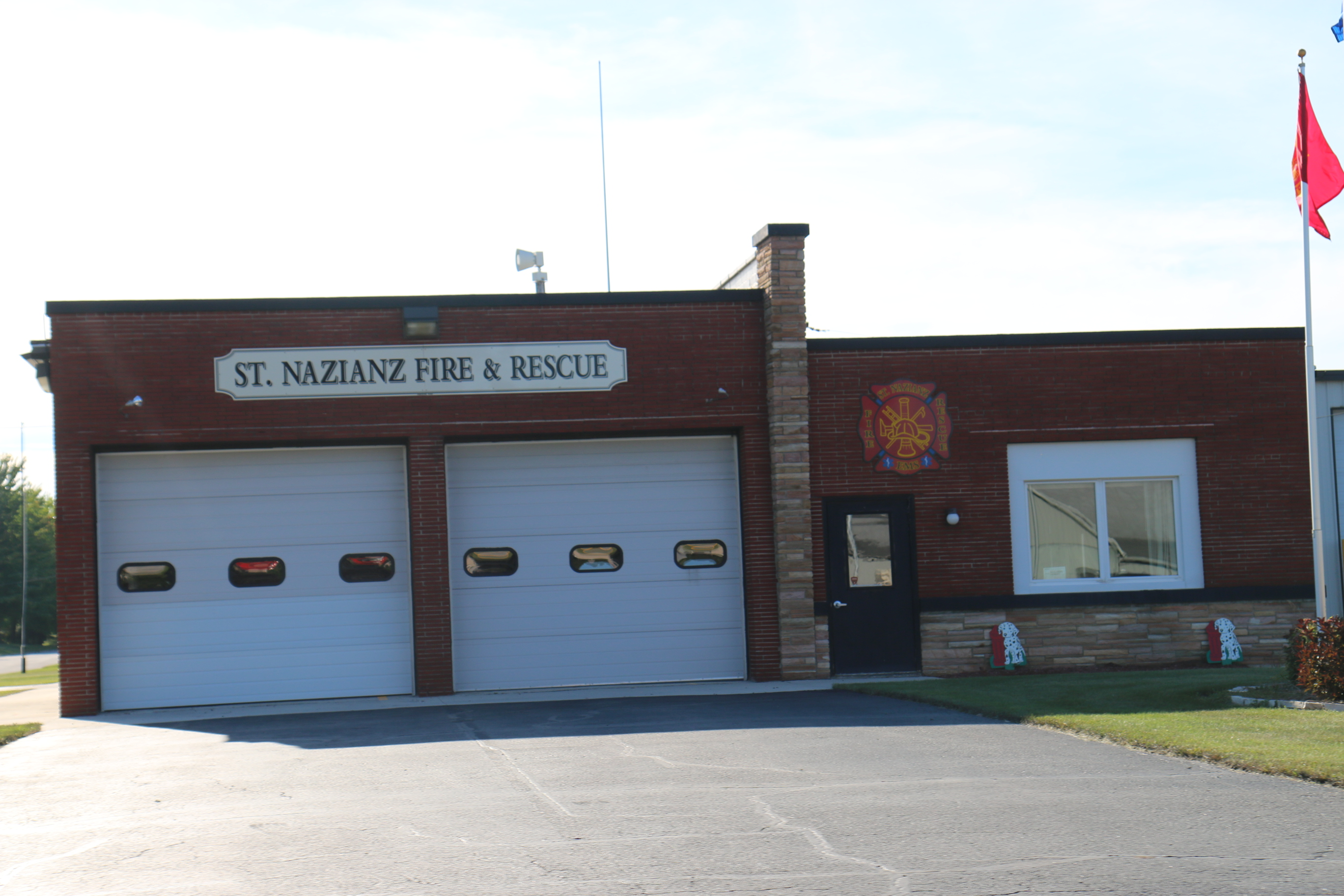
St. Nazianz Fire and Rescue

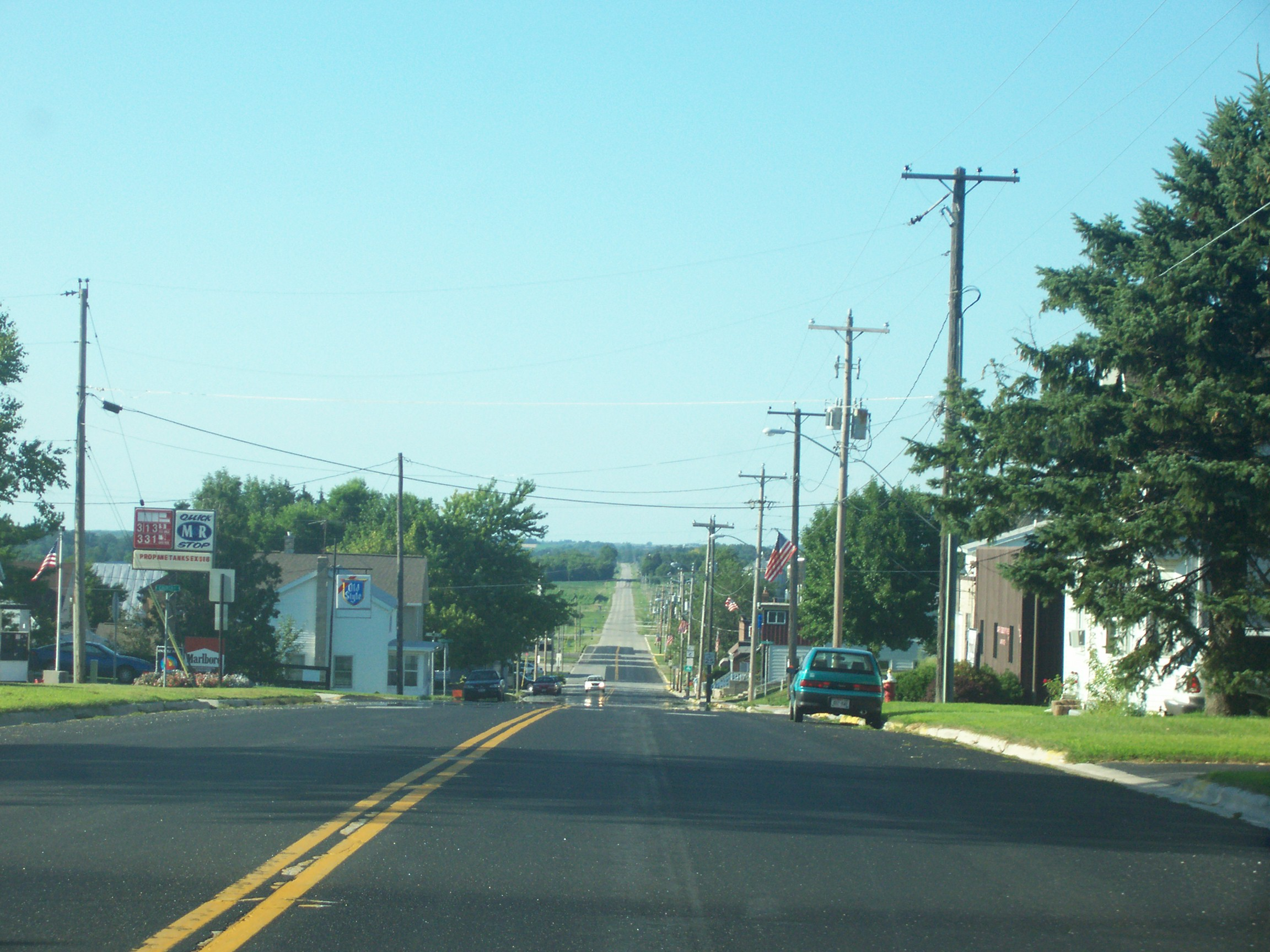
Looking north in St. Nazianz
