= Ambrose Oschwald =

American minister

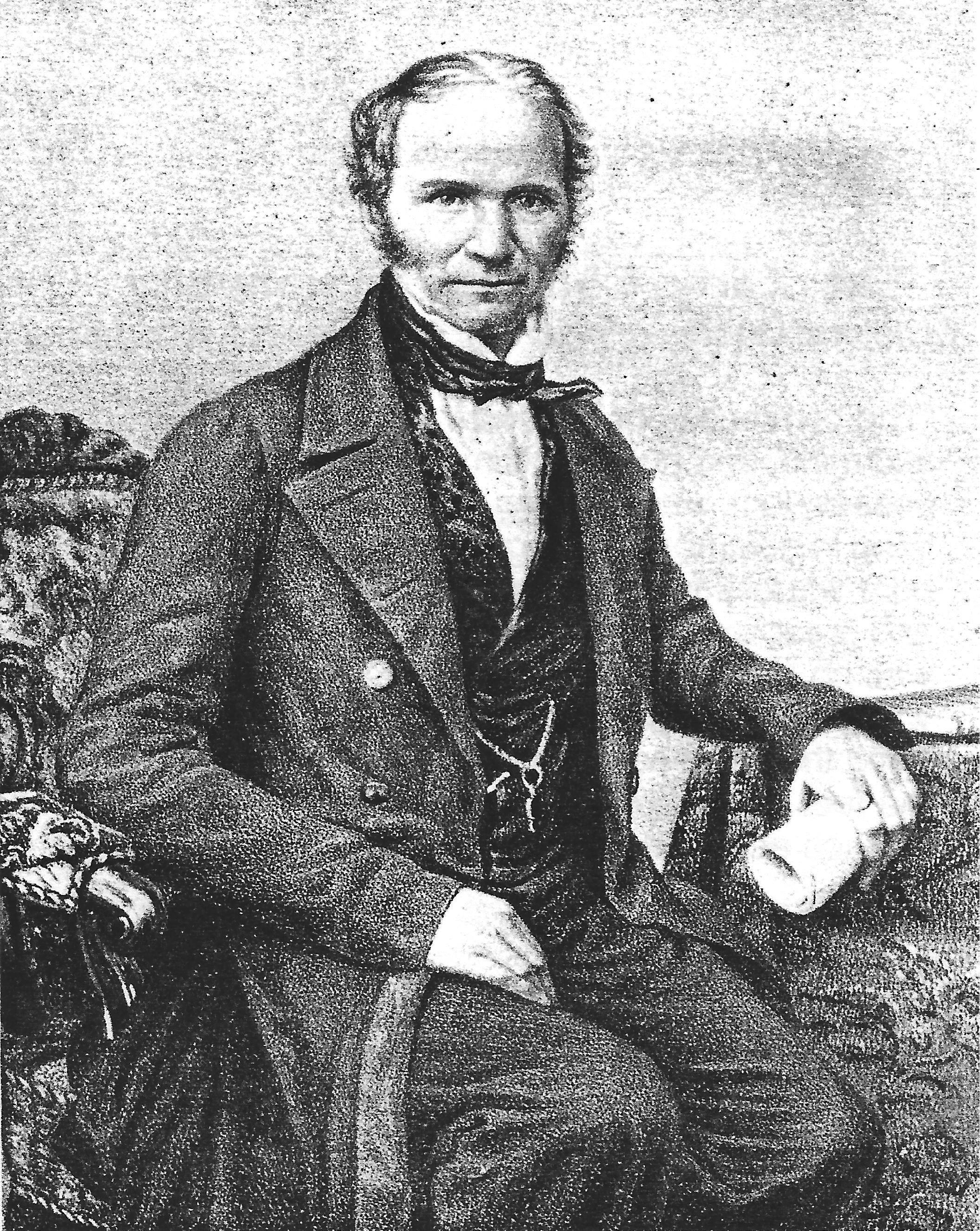
Ambros Oschwald

Ambrose Oschwald (March 14, 1801 – February 27, 1873) was a Roman Catholic priest. Ordained to the priesthood on August 1, 1833, Oschwald came to Wisconsin in August 1854 to form a religious haven for the members of his congregation in what later became the village of St. Nazianz.

== Life ==
Ambrose Oschwald was born in Mundelfingen, Fürstenberg on March 14, 1801. He was educated at Donaueschingen and at the University of Freiburg. He was ordained a priest of the Diocese of Freiburg in 1833. Oschwald studied the healing properties of plants and herbs. He was also attracted to mysticism, and believed he had been blessed with a gift of healing. Local doctors called him a quack.

The German revolutions of 1848–49 persuaded Oschwald to make plans to start a religious colony in America. The first settlers in the Oschwald group numbered 113 and came to the United States from the Black Forest region of Baden, Germany.

The group sailed for America from Strassbourg on the Feast of Corpus Christi in May 1854, on two separate ships. One of the voyages lasted 52 days, and the other took 55 days. By the time they arrived in Milwaukee by train, several members of the group had died. Oschwald bought 3,840 acres (15.5 km^{2}) of land in Manitowoc County for $3.50 per acre. His down payment was $1,500, with the rest paid in five installments.

In late August 1854, Father Oschwald sent six men to locate the land he had purchased, and they took a boat on Lake Michigan from Milwaukee to Manitowoc, the county seat. They then headed west by oxcart, getting as far as the place where Valders now stands. They cut their way through the dense forest and arrived at their destination on August 27. The men named the site St. Nazianz, in honor of St. Gregory Nazianzus. Oschwald followed on September 1, with more men, and the group began working to clear the land and build log houses. Soon after, work started on the community's first church—named for the village's patron saint—a 32-by-24-foot structure, which was built by hand. By October 21, the church was half completed, and Oschwald presided over the first Mass. Like a monastery, members of the colony would gather there daily to pray the Divine Office in their native German.

The settlers began going by the name "The Association" and agreed to share everything in common and work without pay, in imitation of the lives of the first Christians as depicted in the Acts of the Apostles. This arrangement lasted until 1896. The Association built many shops and mills and the community was thriving within just a few years after its start. People began practicing many trades, including blacksmithing, carpentry, masonry, shoemaking, woodworking, tailoring, barrel making, rope making, tanning, weaving, brick-making, baking, brewing, and others. In preparation for the great move, Oschwald had studied medicine at the Ludwig-Maximilians-Universität München, thus he served as both the spiritual guide and healer of bodies for the community.

Following a pattern of life seen in some earlier attempts at Christian utopianism, the celibate members of the community lived in two separate communal residences, and their inhabitants came to follow the rule of the Third Order of St. Francis. The residence of the men, called the Brothers, was called the Loretto Monastery. In 1858 the Sisters were able to occupy the Holy Ghost Convent (familiarly known as the "Pink Convent"). By 1869, five of the Sisters living in this situation had decided to take formal religious vows. They went on to form the Franciscan Sisters of Christian Charity.

Oschwald died on February 27, 1873, and was buried under the altar at the old St. Ambrose Church at the Loretto Monastery. Several years later his body was moved to a shrine near the Loreto Shrine Chapel in the village.

The Salvatorian Fathers to come to St. Nazianz in 1896, just fifteen years after their founding by Father Francis Mary of the Cross Jordan in Rome. The Fathers and Sisters continued to work to improve the holding of the former association, and built St. Ambrose Church in 1898. For many years, they operated a minor seminary on the property.
