= Trempealeau Valley Conference =

Wisconsin high school athletic conference (1927-1959)

The Trempealeau Valley Conference is a former high school athletic conference in Wisconsin. It was in existence from 1927 to 1959 and its member schools were affiliated with the Wisconsin Interscholastic Athletic Association.

== History ==
Location of Original Trempealeau Valley Conference Members

The Trempealeau Valley Conference was formed in 1927 by six small high schools in close proximity to the Trempealeau River in the Driftless Area of Wisconsin: Alma Center, Blair, Hixton, Independence, Taylor and Whitehall. The conference remained a six-member loop for most of its existence, with the first change to membership coming in 1936, when Whitehall left the conference to join the Mississippi Valley Conference and were replaced by Melrose. They would only last one season in the conference before Merrillan, who was displaced from the Little Eight Conference after it ended competition, took their place in 1937. In 1949, Alma Center and Merrillan merged with Humbird to form the new Lincoln High School in Alma Center. Fairchild also joined after being left without a conference affiliation by the dissolution of the 10-12 Conference in 1948. Eleva-Strum (also known as Central Union) joined the Trempealeau Valley in 1952, giving the conference seven members for the rest of its history. In 1959, the Trempealeau Valley Conference was disbanded, with all seven schools joining newly formed conferences. Four schools entered the West Central Conference (Alma Center Lincoln, Fairchild, Hixton and Taylor) and three became members of the Dairyland Conference (Blair, Eleva-Strum and Independence).

== Conference membership history ==
=== Final members ===
| School | Location | Affiliation | Mascot | Colors | Joined | Left | Conference Joined | Current Conference |
|---|---|---|---|---|---|---|---|---|
| Alma Center Lincoln | Alma Center, WI | Public | Hornets | | 1949 | 1959 | West Central | Dairyland |
| Blair | Blair, WI | Public | Cardinals | | 1927 | 1959 | Dairyland | Closed in 1989 (merged into Blair-Taylor) |
| Eleva-Strum | Strum, WI | Public | Cardinals | | 1952 | 1959 | Dairyland | |
| Fairchild | Fairchild, WI | Public | Purple Dragons | | 1949 | 1959 | West Central | Closed in 1968 (merged into Osseo-Fairchild) |
| Hixton | Hixton, WI | Public | Vikings | | 1927 | 1959 | West Central | Closed in 1961 (consolidated into Black River Falls) |
| Independence | Independence, WI | Public | Indees | | 1927 | 1959 | Dairyland | Dairyland (coop with Gilmanton) |
| Taylor | Taylor, WI | Public | Trojans | | 1927 | 1959 | West Central | Closed in 1989 (merged into Blair-Taylor) |

=== Previous members ===
| School | Location | Affiliation | Mascot | Colors | Joined | Left | Conference Joined | Current Conference |
|---|---|---|---|---|---|---|---|---|
| Alma Center | Alma Center, WI | Public | Hornets | | 1927 | 1949 | Closed (merged into Alma Center Lincoln) | |
| Melrose | Melrose, WI | Public | Eagles | | 1936 | 1937 | Independent | Closed in 1965 (merged into Melrose-Mindoro) |
| Merrillan | Merrillan, WI | Public | Yellow Jackets | | 1937 | 1949 | Closed (merged into Alma Center Lincoln) | |
| Whitehall | Whitehall, WI | Public | Norse | | 1927 | 1936 | Mississippi Valley | Dairyland |

== List of conference champions ==
=== Boys Basketball ===
| School | Quantity | Years |
|---|---|---|
| Blair | 14 | 1929, 1931, 1932, 1933, 1935, 1946, 1947, 1948, 1949, 1950, 1953, 1954, 1955, 1956 |
| Independence | 7 | 1937, 1939, 1941, 1944, 1945, 1946, 1952 |
| Taylor | 6 | 1936, 1940, 1941, 1942, 1943, 1959 |
| Whitehall | 3 | 1928, 1930, 1934 |
| Alma Center | 1 | 1938 |
| Alma Center Lincoln | 1 | 1958 |
| Fairchild | 1 | 1951 |
| Hixton | 1 | 1957 |
| Eleva-Strum | 0 | |
| Melrose | 0 | |
| Merrillan | 0 | |
