= Alma, Wisconsin (disambiguation) =

Alma, Wisconsin may refer to:

- Alma, Wisconsin, a city
- Alma, Buffalo County, Wisconsin, a town
- Alma, Jackson County, Wisconsin, a town
- Alma Center, Wisconsin, a village
