= 10-12 Conference =

Wisconsin high school athletic conference (1946-1948)

The 10-12 Conference is a former high school athletic conference located in western Wisconsin. It was a relatively short-lived organization, competing from 1946 to 1948 and its member schools were affiliated with the Wisconsin Interscholastic Athletic Association.

== History ==
Location of 10-12 Conference Members

The 10-12 Conference was formed in 1946 by four small high schools in western Wisconsin: Eleva, Fairchild, Humbird and Strum. The conference was named after two highways that were located within its geographic footprint (U.S. Route 10 and U.S. Route 12), and member schools were located in Clark, Eau Claire and Trempealeau Counties. In 1948, the school districts in Eleva and Strum merged, and Central Union High School of Eleva-Strum was opened in Strum shortly afterwards. The decrease in members to three led to the demise of the 10-12 Conference, only two years after it was originally founded. Eleva-Strum and Fairchild both became members of the Trempealeau Valley Conference in later years (Fairchild in 1949, Eleva-Strum in 1952), and Humbird competed as an independent for its final year of existence before consolidation with Alma Center and Merrillan into Lincoln High School in Alma Center.

== Conference membership history ==
School	Location	Affiliation	Mascot	Colors	Joined	Left	Conference Joined	Current Conference
Eleva	Eleva, WI	Public	Elevators		1946	1948	Closed (merged into Eleva-Strum)	
Fairchild	Fairchild, WI	Public	Purple Dragons		1946	1948	Independent	Closed in 1968 (merged into Osseo-Fairchild)
Humbird	Humbird, WI	Public	Game Birds		1946	1948	Independent	Closed in 1949 (merged into Alma Center Lincoln)
Strum	Strum, WI	Public	Blues		1946	1948	Closed (merged into Eleva-Strum)	

== List of conference champions ==
=== Boys Basketball ===
School	Quantity	Years
Eleva	2	1947, 1948
Fairchild	0	
Humbird	0	
Strum	0	
