= List of cities in Wisconsin =

Wisconsin Municipalities map of counties, cities, villages, and towns.

Wisconsin is a state located in the Midwestern United States. As of January 1, 2021, there were 190 cities in Wisconsin, and 1,883 municipalities.

== List of cities ==
City	County(ies)	Population (2010 Census)	Population (2020 Census)	Class	Incorporation date
Abbotsford	Clark; Marathon	2,310	2,275	4th	1965
Adams	Adams	1,967	1,761	4th	1926
Algoma	Kewaunee	3,167	3,243	4th	1879
Alma	Buffalo	781	716	4th	1885
Altoona	Eau Claire	6,706	8,293	4th	1887
Amery	Polk	2,902	2,962	4th	1919
Antigo	Langlade	8,234	8,100	4th	1885
Appleton	Calumet; Outagamie; Winnebago	72,623	75,644	2nd	1857
Arcadia	Trempealeau	2,925	3,737	4th	1925
Ashland	Ashland; Bayfield	8,216	7,908	4th	1887
Augusta	Eau Claire	1,550	1,567	4th	1885
Baraboo	Sauk	12,048	12,556	3rd	1882
Barron	Barron	3,423	3,733	4th	1887
Bayfield	Bayfield	487	584	4th	1913
Beaver Dam	Dodge	16,243	16,708	3rd	1856
Beloit	Rock	36,966	36,657	3rd	1857
Berlin	Green Lake; Waushara	5,524	5,571	4th	1857
Black River Falls	Jackson	3,622	3,523	4th	1883
Blair	Trempealeau	1,366	1,325	4th	1949
Bloomer	Chippewa	3,539	3,683	4th	1920
Boscobel	Grant	3,231	3,286	4th	1873
Brillion	Calumet	3,148	3,262	4th	1944
Brodhead	Green; Rock	3,293	3,274	4th	1891
Brookfield	Waukesha	37,920	41,464	3rd	1954
Buffalo City	Buffalo	1,023	1,007	4th	1859
Burlington	Racine; Walworth	10,464	11,047	3rd	1900
Cedarburg	Ozaukee	11,412	12,121	4th	1885
Chetek	Barron	2,221	2,172	4th	1891
Chilton	Calumet	3,933	4,080	4th	1877
Chippewa Falls	Chippewa	13,679	14,731	3rd	1869
Clintonville	Waupaca	4,559	4,591	4th	1887
Colby	Clark; Marathon	1,852	1,952	4th	1891
Columbus	Columbia; Dodge	4,991	5,540	4th	1874
Cornell	Chippewa	1,467	1,453	4th	1956
Crandon	Forest	1,920	1,713	4th	1898
Cuba City	Grant; Lafayette	2,086	1,890	4th	1925
Cudahy	Milwaukee	18,267	18,204	3rd	1906
Cumberland	Barron	2,170	2,274	4th	1885
Darlington	Lafayette	2,451	2,462	4th	1877
Delafield	Waukesha	7,085	7,185	4th	1959
Delavan	Walworth	8,463	8,505	4th	1897
De Pere	Brown	23,800	25,410	3rd	1883
Dodgeville	Iowa	4,698	4,984	4th	1889
Durand	Pepin	1,931	1,854	4th	1887
Eagle River	Vilas	1,398	1,628	4th	1937
Eau Claire	Chippewa; Eau Claire	65,883	69,421	2nd	1872
Edgerton	Dane; Rock	5,461	5,945	4th	1883
Elkhorn	Walworth	10,084	10,247	4th	1897
Elroy	Juneau	1,442	1,356	4th	1885
Evansville	Rock	5,012	5,703	4th	1896
Fennimore	Grant	2,497	2,764	4th	1919
Fitchburg	Dane	25,260	29,609	4th	1983
Fond du Lac	Fond du Lac	43,021	44,678	2nd	1852
Fort Atkinson	Jefferson	12,368	12,579	3rd	1878
Fountain City	Buffalo	859	806	4th	1889
Fox Lake	Dodge	1,519	1,604	4th	1938
Franklin	Milwaukee	35,451	36,816	3rd	1956
Galesville	Trempealeau	1,481	1,662	4th	1942
Gillett	Oconto	1,386	1,289	4th	1944
Glendale	Milwaukee	12,872	13,357	3rd	1950
Glenwood City	St. Croix	1,242	1,306	4th	1895
Green Bay	Brown	104,057	107,395	2nd	1854
Green Lake	Green Lake	960	1,001	4th	1962
Greenfield	Milwaukee	36,720	37,803	3rd	1957
Greenwood	Clark	1,026	1,058	4th	1891
Hartford	Dodge; Washington	14,223	15,626	3rd	1883
Hayward	Sawyer	2,318	2,533	4th	1915
Hillsboro	Vernon	1,417	1,397	4th	1885
Horicon	Dodge	3,655	3,767	4th	1897
Hudson	St. Croix	12,719	14,755	4th	1858
Hurley	Iron	1,547	1,558	4th	1918
Independence	Trempealeau	1,336	1,498	4th	1942
Janesville	Rock	63,575	65,615	2nd	1853
Jefferson	Jefferson	7,973	7,793	4th	1878
Juneau	Dodge	2,814	2,658	4th	1887
Kaukauna	Outagamie	15,462	17,089	3rd	1885
Kenosha	Kenosha	99,218	99,986	2nd	1850
Kewaunee	Kewaunee	2,952	2,837	4th	1883
Kiel	Calumet; Manitowoc	3,738	3,932	4th	1920
La Crosse	La Crosse	51,320	52,680	2nd	1856
Ladysmith	Rusk	3,414	3,216	4th	1905
Lake Geneva	Walworth	7,651	8,277	4th	1883
Lake Mills	Jefferson	5,708	6,211	4th	1905
Lancaster	Grant	3,868	3,907	4th	1878
Lodi	Columbia	3,050	3,189	4th	1941
Loyal	Clark	1,261	1,203	4th	1948
Madison	Dane	233,209	269,840	2nd	1856
Manawa	Waupaca	1,371	1,441	4th	1954
Manitowoc	Manitowoc	33,736	34,626	3rd	1870
Marinette	Marinette	10,968	11,119	3rd	1887
Marion	Shawano; Waupaca	1,260	1,324	4th	1898
Markesan	Green Lake	1,476	1,377	4th	1959
Marshfield	Marathon; Wood	19,118	18,929	3rd	1883
Mauston	Juneau	4,423	4,347	4th	1883
Mayville	Dodge	5,154	5,196	4th	1885
Medford	Taylor	4,326	4,349	4th	1889
Mellen	Ashland	731	698	4th	1907
Menasha	Calumet; Winnebago	17,353	18,268	3rd	1874
Menomonie	Dunn	16,264	16,843	4th	1882
Mequon	Ozaukee	23,132	25,142	4th	1957
Merrill	Lincoln	9,661	9,347	4th	1883
Middleton	Dane	17,442	21,827	3rd	1963
Milton	Rock	5,546	5,716	4th	1969
Milwaukee	Milwaukee; Washington; Waukesha Ozaukee	594,833	577,222	1st	1846
Mineral Point	Iowa	2,487	2,581	4th	1857
Mondovi	Buffalo	2,777	2,845	4th	1889
Monona	Dane	7,533	8,624	4th	1969
Monroe	Green	10,827	10,661	4th	1882
Montello	Marquette	1,495	1,448	4th	1938
Montreal	Iron	807	801	4th	1924
Mosinee	Marathon	3,988	4,452	4th	1931
Muskego	Waukesha	24,135	25,032	3rd	1964
Neenah	Winnebago	25,501	27,319	3rd	1873
Neillsville	Clark	2,463	2,384	4th	1882
Nekoosa	Wood	2,580	2,449	4th	1926
New Berlin	Waukesha	39,584	40,451	3rd	1959
New Holstein	Calumet	3,236	3,195	4th	1889
New Lisbon	Juneau	2,554	1,748	4th	1889
New London	Outagamie; Waupaca	7,295	7,348	4th	1877
New Richmond	St. Croix	8,375	10,079	4th	1885
Niagara	Marinette	1,624	1,602	4th	1992
Oak Creek	Milwaukee	34,451	36,497	3rd	1955
Oconomowoc	Waukesha	15,712	18,203	3rd	1875
Oconto	Oconto	4,513	4,609	4th	1869
Oconto Falls	Oconto	2,891	2,957	4th	1919
Omro	Winnebago	3,517	3,652	4th	1944
Onalaska	La Crosse	17,736	18,803	4th	1887
Oshkosh	Winnebago	66,083	66,816	2nd	1853
Osseo	Trempealeau	1,701	1,811	4th	1941
Owen	Clark	940	916	4th	1925
Park Falls	Price	2,462	2,410	4th	1912
Peshtigo	Marinette	3,502	3,420	4th	1903
Pewaukee	Waukesha	13,195	15,914	3rd	1999
Phillips	Price	1,478	1,533	4th	1891
Pittsville	Wood	874	813	4th	1887
Platteville	Grant	11,224	11,836	4th	1876
Plymouth	Sheboygan	8,445	8,932	4th	1877
Port Washington	Ozaukee	11,250	12,353	4th	1882
Portage	Columbia	10,324	10,581	4th	1854
Prairie du Chien	Crawford	5,911	5,506	4th	1872
Prescott	Pierce	4,258	4,333	4th	1857
Princeton	Green Lake	1,214	1,267	4th	1920
Racine	Racine	78,860	77,816	2nd	1848
Reedsburg	Sauk	10,014	9,984	4th	1887
Rhinelander	Oneida	7,798	8,285	4th	1894
Rice Lake	Barron	8,438	9,040	4th	1887
Richland Center	Richland	5,184	5,114	4th	1887
Ripon	Fond du Lac	7,733	7,863	4th	1858
River Falls	Pierce; St. Croix	15,000	16,182	3rd	1875
St. Croix Falls	Polk	2,133	2,208	4th	1958
St. Francis	Milwaukee	9,365	9,161	4th	1951
Schofield	Marathon	2,169	2,157	4th	1951
Seymour	Outagamie	3,451	3,546	4th	1879
Shawano	Shawano	9,305	9,243	4th	1874
Sheboygan	Sheboygan	49,288	49,929	2nd	1853
Sheboygan Falls	Sheboygan	7,775	8,210	4th	1913
Shell Lake	Washburn	1,347	1,371	4th	1961
Shullsburg	Lafayette	1,226	1,173	4th	1889
South Milwaukee	Milwaukee	21,156	20,795	4th	1897
Sparta	Monroe	9,522	10,025	4th	1883
Spooner	Washburn	2,682	2,477	4th	1909
Stanley	Chippewa; Clark	3,608	3,804	4th	1898
Stevens Point	Portage	26,717	25,666	3rd	1858
Stoughton	Dane	12,611	13,173	4th	1882
Sturgeon Bay	Door	9,144	9,646	4th	1883
Sun Prairie	Dane	29,364	35,967	3rd	1958
Superior	Douglas	27,244	26,751	3rd	1858
Thorp	Clark	1,621	1,795	4th	1948
Tomah	Monroe	9,093	9,570	4th	1883
Tomahawk	Lincoln	3,397	3,441	4th	1891
Two Rivers	Manitowoc	11,712	11,271	3rd	1878
Verona	Dane	10,619	14,030	4th	1977
Viroqua	Vernon	5,079	4,504	4th	1885
Washburn	Bayfield	2,117	2,051	4th	1904
Waterloo	Jefferson	3,333	3,492	4th	1962
Watertown	Dodge; Jefferson	23,861	22,926	3rd	1853
Waukesha	Waukesha	70,718	71,158	2nd	1895
Waupaca	Waupaca	6,069	6,282	4th	1878
Waupun	Dodge; Fond du Lac	11,340	11,344	4th	1878
Wausau	Marathon	39,106	39,994	2nd	1872
Wautoma	Waushara	2,218	2,209	4th	1901
Wauwatosa	Milwaukee	46,396	48,387	2nd	1897
West Allis	Milwaukee	60,411	60,325	2nd	1906
West Bend	Washington	31,078	31,752	3rd	1885
Westby	Vernon	2,200	2,332	4th	1920
Weyauwega	Waupaca	1,900	1,796	4th	1939
Whitehall	Trempealeau	1,558	1,645	4th	1941
Whitewater	Jefferson; Walworth	14,390	14,889	4th	1885
Wisconsin Dells	Adams; Columbia; Juneau; Sauk	2,678	2,942	4th	1925
Wisconsin Rapids	Wood	18,367	18,877	3rd	1869

== Fictional ==
- Deerlaken, Wisconsin, the setting of Irresistible
- Point Place, Wisconsin, the setting of That '70s Show and its sequel That '90s Show
- Stillwell, Wisconsin, the setting of novels by Milton K. Ozaki
- Willows, Wisconsin, the home of Barbie

== See also ==
- List of municipalities in Wisconsin by population
- List of towns in Wisconsin
- List of villages in Wisconsin
- Political subdivisions of Wisconsin

== Images ==
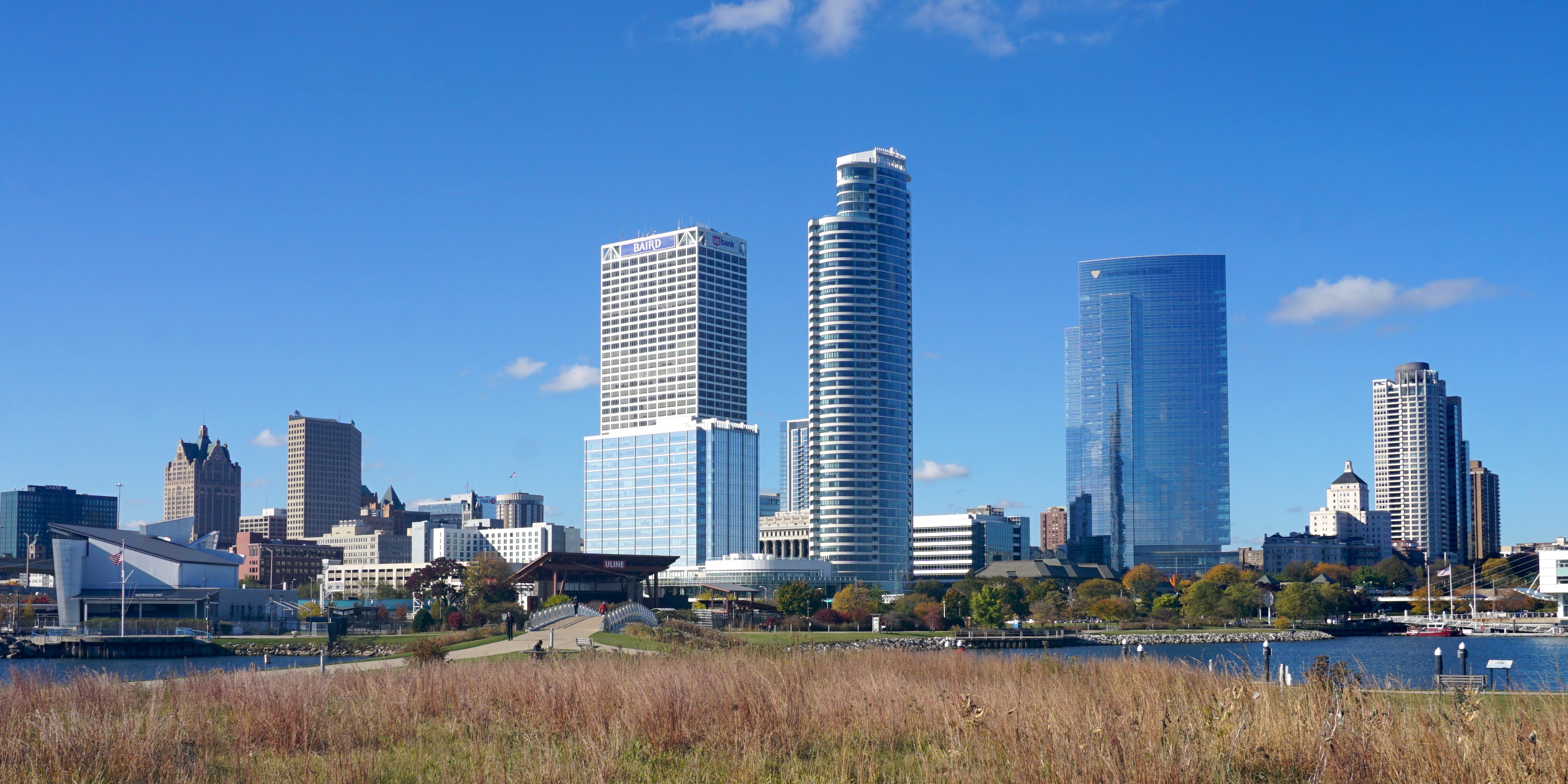
Milwaukee is the most populous city in Wisconsin.

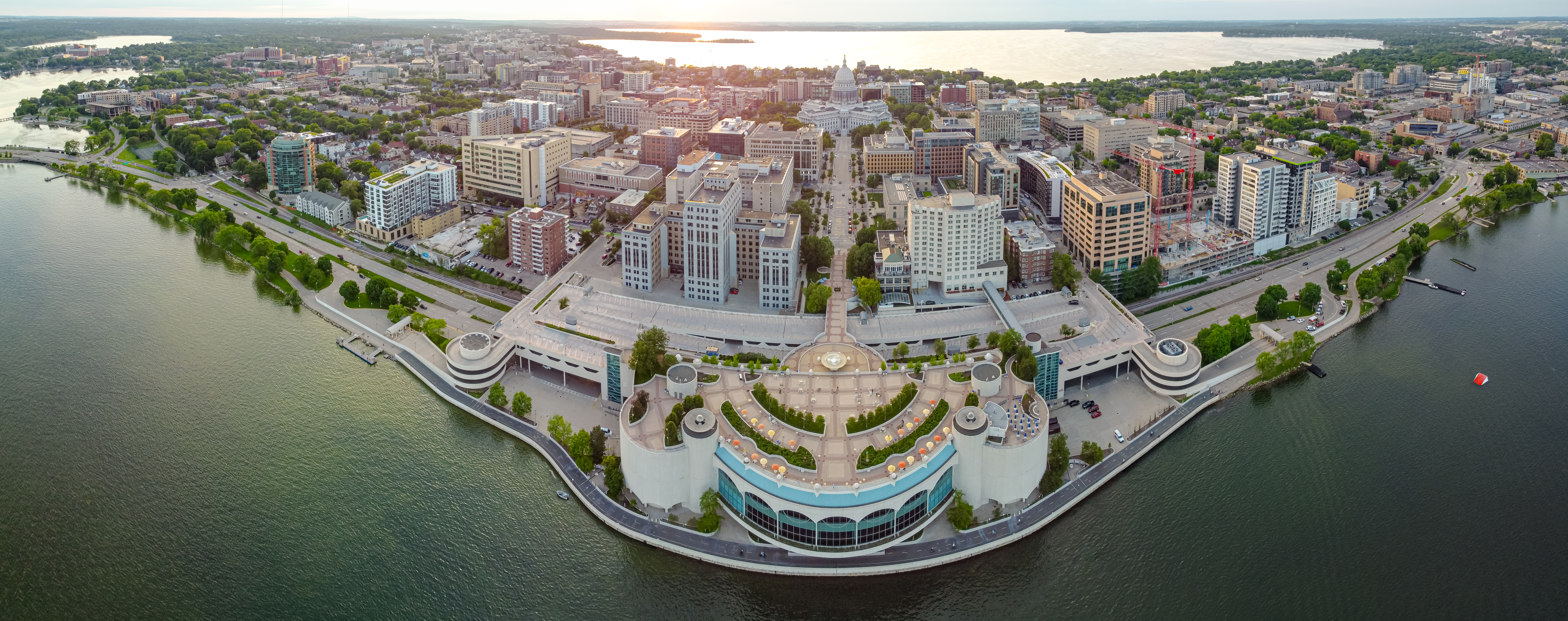
Madison is the state's capital and second-most populous city.

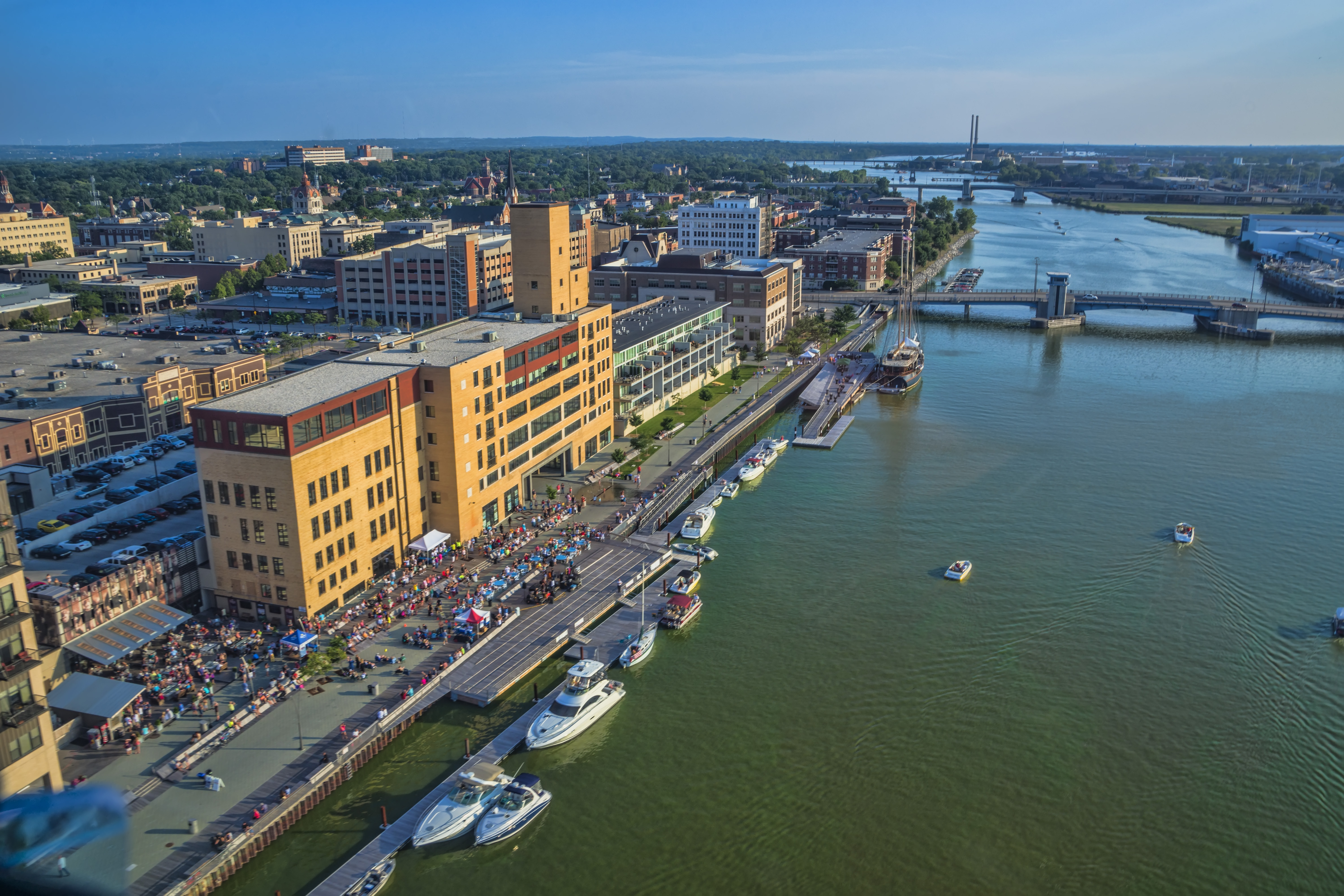
Green Bay is the state's third-most populous city.
