= Jerome B. Miller =

American politician

Jerome Bonaparte Miller (August 12, 1846 – December 10, 1920) was a member of the Wisconsin State Assembly.

== Biography ==
Miller was born on August 12, 1846, in Sherman, New York. During the American Civil War, he served with the 151st Illinois Volunteer Infantry Regiment of the Union Army. Afterwards, he settled in Alma Center, Wisconsin, where he was a bank cashier worked in hardware. Miller died there on December 10, 1920.

His brother, Edwin A. Miller, was also a member of the Assembly.

== Political career ==
Miller was a Republican member of the Assembly during the 1895 session. Additionally, he was a member of the town board (similar to city council) of Alma Center and of the county board of Jackson County, Wisconsin.
