= Edwin A. Miller =

American politician

Edwin Adelbert Miller (July 18, 1857 – May 28, 1913) was a member of the Wisconsin State Assembly during the 1901 session. He represented Jackson County, Wisconsin as a Republican.

Miller was born in Belvidere, Illinois, the son of William J. Miller (1811–1899) and Rachel Minerva Heath Miller (1814–1895). Miller died at his home in Hixton, Wisconsin from hardening of the liver (cirrhosis). His brother, Jerome, was also a member of the Assembly.
