= Alma, Jackson County, Wisconsin =

Alma, Wisconsin
- Town
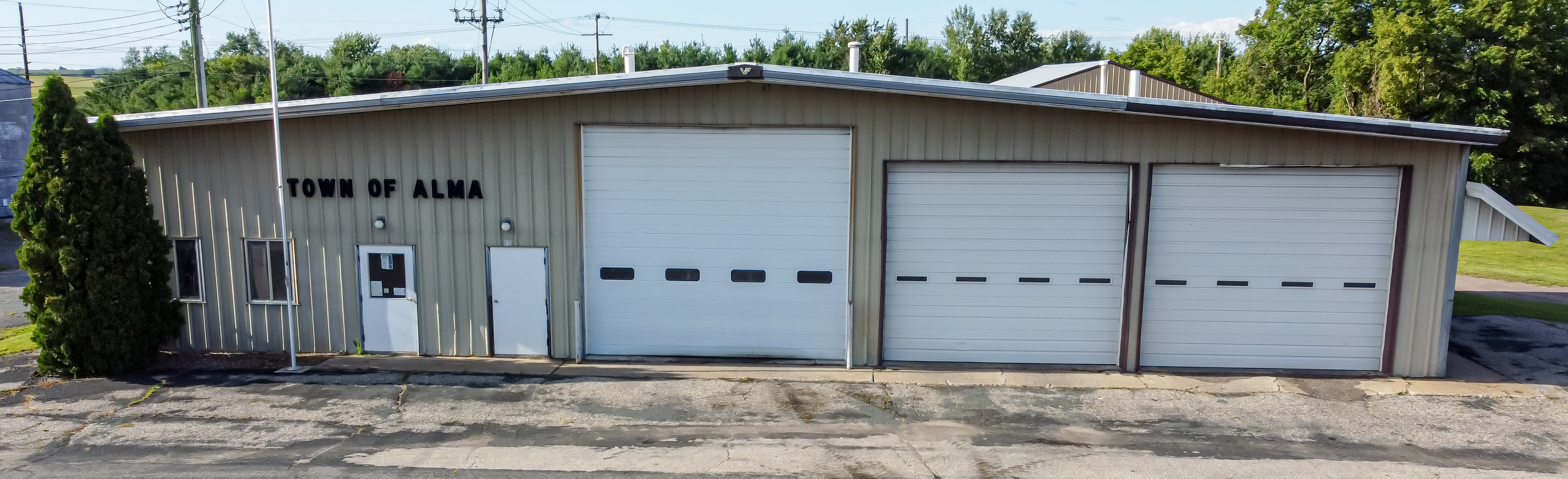
- Town hall in Alma Center

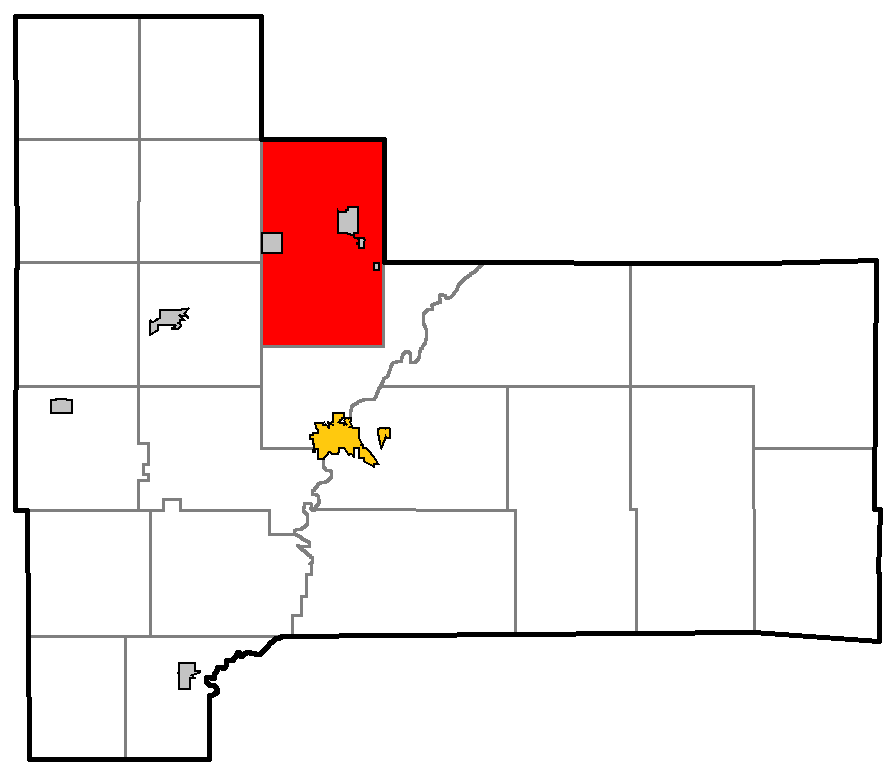
- Location of Alma, Jackson County

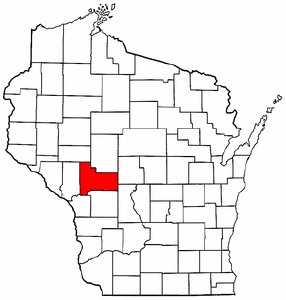
- Location of Jackson County, Wisconsin
- Coordinates: 44°25′49″N 90°51′46″W
- Country: United States
- State: Wisconsin
- County: Jackson

Area
  - Total: 58.0 sq mi (150.1 km^{2})
  - Land: 58.0 sq mi (150.1 km^{2})
  - Water: 0.039 sq mi (0.1 km^{2})
- Elevation: 991 ft (302 m)

Population (2020)
  - Total: 1,033
  - Density: 17.82/sq mi (6.882/km^{2})
- Time zone: UTC-6 (Central (CST))
  - Summer (DST): UTC-5 (CDT)
- FIPS code: 55-01275
- GNIS feature ID: 1582677
- Website: https://townofalmajacksoncounty.com/

Alma is a town in Jackson County, Wisconsin, United States. The population was 1,033 at the 2020 census. The Village of Alma Center is located within the town. The ghost town of Wrightsville was also located in the town.

== Geography ==
According to the United States Census Bureau, the town has a total area of 58.0 square miles (150.1 km^{2}), of which 57.9 square miles (150.1 km^{2}) is land and 0.04 square mile (0.1 km^{2}) (0.05%) is water.

== Demographics ==
As of the census of 2000, there were 983 people, 344 households, and 265 families residing in the town. The population density was 17.0 people per square mile (6.6/km^{2}). There were 393 housing units at an average density of 6.8 per square mile (2.6/km^{2}). The racial makeup of the town was 91.35% White, 1.42% Native American, 0.20% Asian, 6.71% from other races, and 0.31% from two or more races. Hispanic or Latino of any race were 7.43% of the population.

There were 344 households, out of which 38.1% had children under the age of 18 living with them, 65.1% were married couples living together, 5.8% had a female householder with no husband present, and 22.7% were non-families. 18.3% of all households were made up of individuals, and 6.7% had someone living alone who was 65 years of age or older. The average household size was 2.71 and the average family size was 3.08.

In the town, the population was spread out, with 27.8% under the age of 18, 7.3% from 18 to 24, 28.1% from 25 to 44, 25.6% from 45 to 64, and 11.2% who were 65 years of age or older. The median age was 36 years. For every 100 females, there were 116.0 males. For every 100 females age 18 and over, there were 121.2 males.

The median income for a household in the town was $38,000, and the median income for a family was $41,979. Males had a median income of $27,260 versus $21,078 for females. The per capita income for the town was $15,602. About 2.8% of families and 8.1% of the population were below the poverty line, including 6.5% of those under age 18 and 1.9% of those age 65 or over.
