= Blair, Wisconsin =

- City
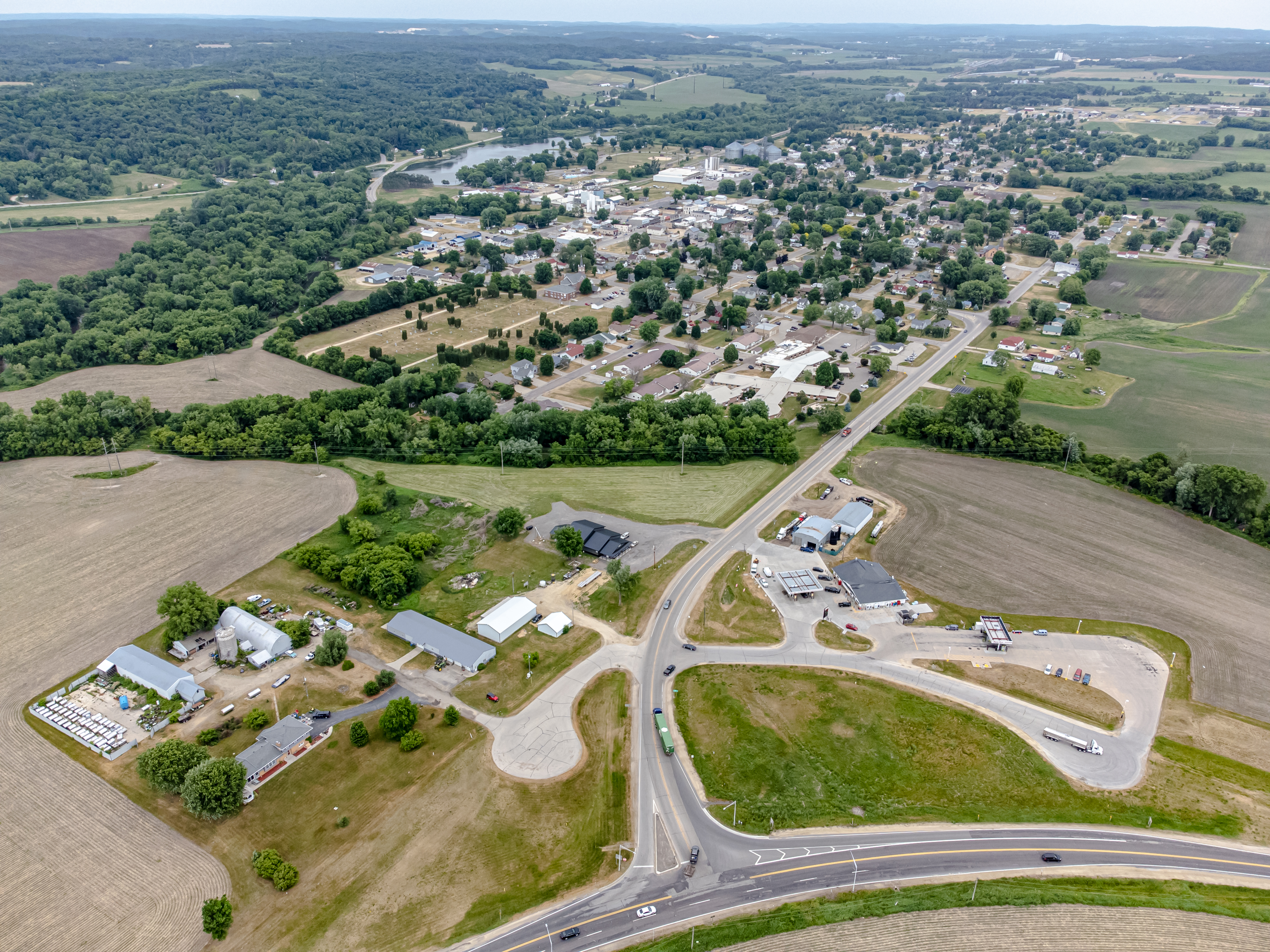
- Junction of U.S. Route 53 and Wisconsin Highway 95 in the foreground

- Location of Blair in Trempealeau County, Wisconsin.

- Location within Wisconsin Location within the United States
- Coordinates: 44°17′42″N 91°13′48″W
- Country: United States
- State: Wisconsin
- County: Trempealeau

Area
  - Total: 4.39 sq mi (11.36 km^{2})
  - Land: 4.30 sq mi (11.14 km^{2})
  - Water: 0.085 sq mi (0.22 km^{2})
- Elevation: 850 ft (260 m)

Population (2020)
  - Total: 1,325
  - Density: 308/sq mi (118.9/km^{2})
- Time zone: UTC-6 (Central (CST))
  - Summer (DST): UTC-5 (CDT)
- Area code: 608
- FIPS code: 55-08075
- GNIS feature ID: 1561910
- Website: cityofblair.org

Blair is a city in Trempealeau County, Wisconsin, United States, along the Trempealeau River. The population was 1,325 at the 2020 census. Blair is on the former Green Bay and Western Railroad, which ran down the Trempealeau River valley to Winona, Minnesota.

== History ==
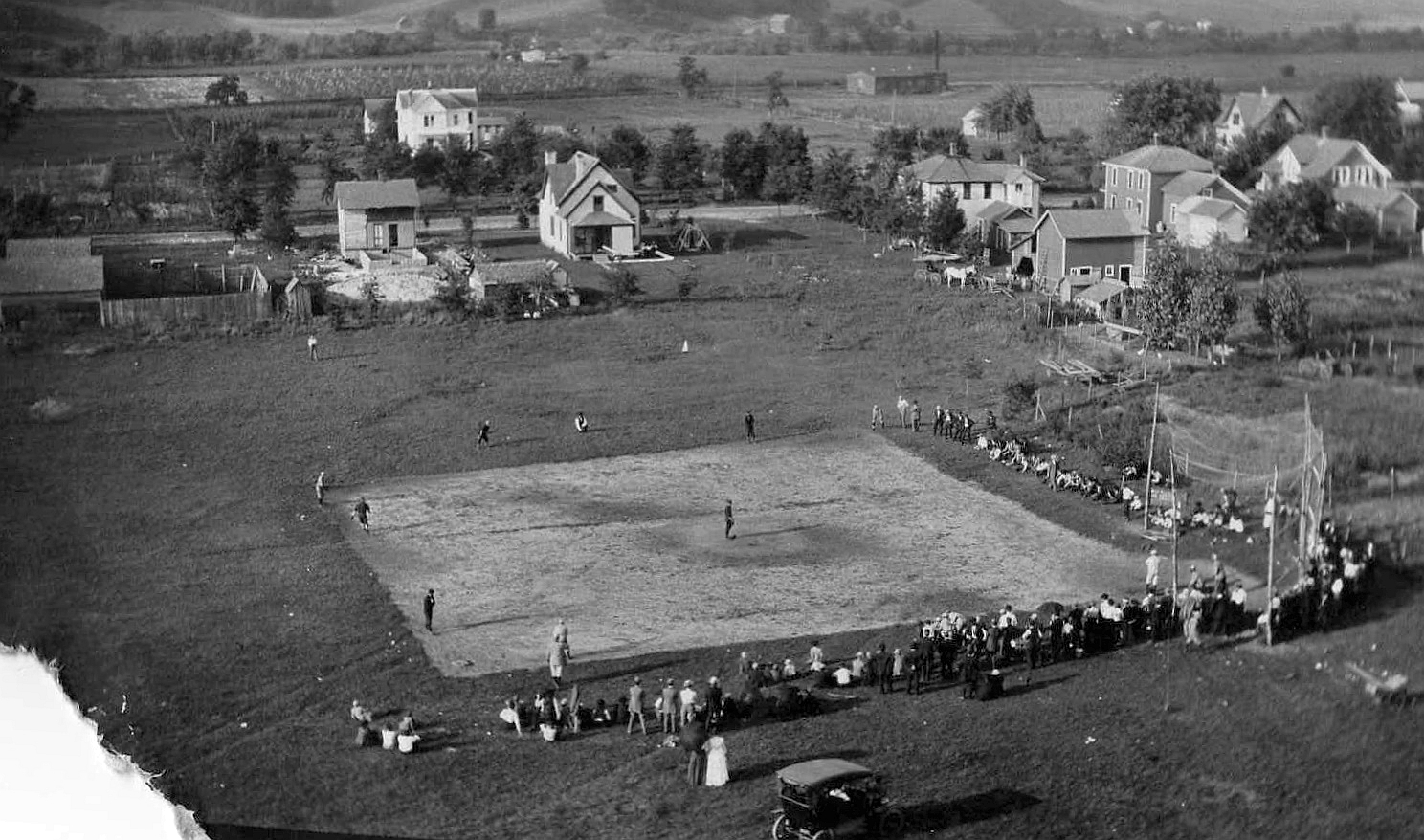
Baseball game between Blair and Arcadia, 1912

The city was first settled during the 1850s. The majority of the city's population are descended from Norwegian settlers, with a smaller group descended from German settlers. The city's Norwegian heritage is represented by annual lefse and lutefisk suppers at the churches and a love of polka music. A lefse company is located in Blair.

The city's name was changed from Porterville in 1873 when the Green Bay and Western Railroad was routed through the city. The new name of Blair came from one of the railroad's chief investors, John Insley Blair. At one time, during the heyday of railroads, a branch line connected the GB&W with the nearby village of Ettrick, although it was later abandoned. The railroad continues to operate, although under a different name.

The city has avoided the fate of some small towns in the Midwest which slowly lost population due to young people leaving for jobs elsewhere. The population of Blair nearly doubled in the years between 1950 and 2000. During the 1950s and earlier annual floods during the snow melt were often experienced, but better farming techniques now make flooding rare. More recently, a number of Amish farming families have settled in the area and their horse-drawn carriages are sometimes seen on the roads.

== Geography ==
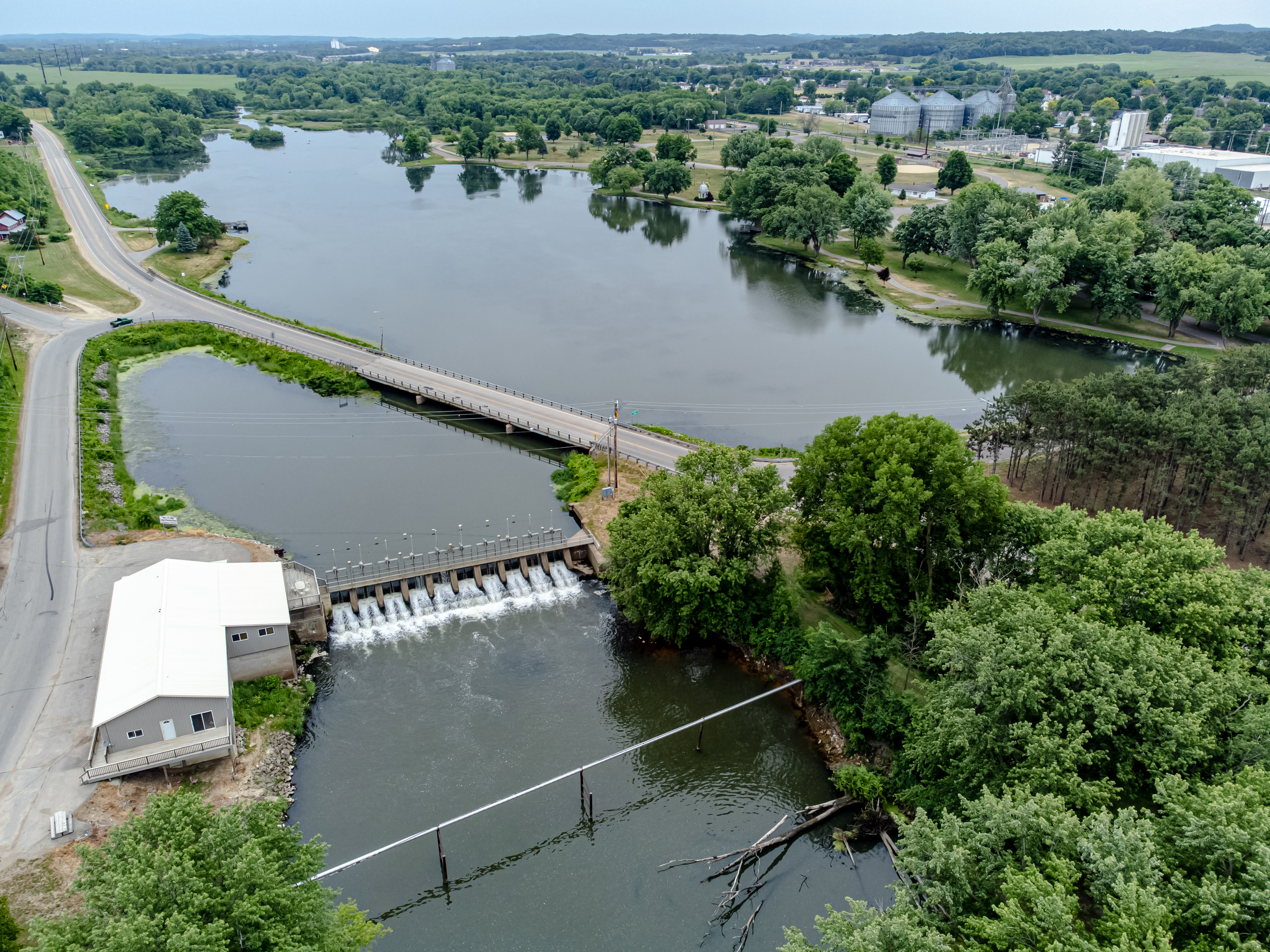
Lake Henry in Blair

According to the United States Census Bureau, the city has a total area of 4.39 square miles (11.37 km^{2}), of which 4.30 square miles (11.14 km^{2}) is land and 0.09 square miles (0.23 km^{2}) is water.

Two highways connect to the city: Highway 53, a north-south route, and Highway 95, an east-west route. The closest large cities are Eau Claire to the north and La Crosse to the south. Whitehall, the county seat, is seven miles away. The rural area surrounding Blair is in the Town of Preston. Nearby communities include Taylor, Arcadia, Independence, Hixton, and Galesville.

The Trempealeau River near Blair was dammed to create Lake Henry, named after one of the first settlers.

Blair is in the Driftless Area, which was undisturbed by the last great glacial flow over North America. The area is also known as the Coulee Region, characterized by rolling hills. The forested hills are favored by deer hunters. Pheasants and grouse are also hunted. Local streams are fished for trout, which are stocked.

=== Climate ===
The Köppen Climate Classification subtype for this climate is "Dfb" (Warm Summer Continental Climate).

Climate data for Blair, Wisconsin (1991–2020)
Month	Jan	Feb	Mar	Apr	May	Jun	Jul	Aug	Sep	Oct	Nov	Dec	Year
Mean daily maximum °F (°C)	24.0 (−4.4)	29.3 (−1.5)	41.4 (5.2)	55.5 (13.1)	67.6 (19.8)	77.5 (25.3)	81.3 (27.4)	79.4 (26.3)	71.7 (22.1)	57.9 (14.4)	42.4 (5.8)	29.2 (−1.6)	54.8 (12.7)
Daily mean °F (°C)	14.0 (−10.0)	18.8 (−7.3)	31.0 (−0.6)	43.9 (6.6)	56.2 (13.4)	66.3 (19.1)	70.0 (21.1)	67.8 (19.9)	59.9 (15.5)	46.3 (7.9)	33.1 (0.6)	20.7 (−6.3)	44.0 (6.7)
Mean daily minimum °F (°C)	4.1 (−15.5)	8.2 (−13.2)	20.7 (−6.3)	32.4 (0.2)	44.7 (7.1)	55.2 (12.9)	58.8 (14.9)	56.2 (13.4)	48.1 (8.9)	34.7 (1.5)	23.9 (−4.5)	12.1 (−11.1)	33.3 (0.7)
Average precipitation inches (mm)	1.01 (26)	1.21 (31)	1.66 (42)	3.31 (84)	4.76 (121)	5.04 (128)	4.44 (113)	4.64 (118)	4.07 (103)	2.51 (64)	1.78 (45)	1.18 (30)	35.61 (905)
Average snowfall inches (cm)	10.0 (25)	8.5 (22)	8.9 (23)	2.5 (6.4)	0.0 (0.0)	0.0 (0.0)	0.0 (0.0)	0.0 (0.0)	0.0 (0.0)	0.2 (0.51)	2.2 (5.6)	8.8 (22)	41.1 (104.51)
Source: NOAA

== Demographics ==
Historical population
Census	Pop.	Note	%±
1880	184		—
1900	438		—
1910	486		11.0%
1920	657		35.2%
1930	702		6.8%
1940	856		21.9%
1950	873		2.0%
1960	909		4.1%
1970	1,036		14.0%
1980	1,142		10.2%
1990	1,126		−1.4%
2000	1,273		13.1%
2010	1,366		7.3%
2020	1,325		−3.0%
U.S. Decennial Census

=== 2010 census ===
As of the census of 2010, there were 1,366 people, 571 households, and 319 families residing in the city. The population density was 1,187.8 inhabitants per square mile (458.6/km^{2}). There were 638 housing units at an average density of 554.8 per square mile (214.2/km^{2}). The racial makeup of the city was 96.6% White, 0.4% African American, 0.2% Native American, 0.1% Asian, 1.3% from other races, and 1.4% from two or more races. Hispanic or Latino of any race were 3.8% of the population.

There were 571 households, of which 30.1% had children under the age of 18 living with them, 41.2% were married couples living together, 8.9% had a female householder with no husband present, 5.8% had a male householder with no wife present, and 44.1% were non-families. 37.3% of all households were made up of individuals, and 18.1% had someone living alone who was 65 years of age or older. The average household size was 2.27 and the average family size was 2.97.

The median age in the city was 41.1 years. 24.1% of residents were under the age of 18; 6.7% were between the ages of 18 and 24; 23.8% were from 25 to 44; 22.7% were from 45 to 64; and 22.5% were 65 years of age or older. The gender makeup of the city was 47.1% male and 52.9% female.

=== 2000 census ===
As of the census of 2000, there were 1,273 people, 533 households, and 305 families residing in the city. The population density was 1,175.2 people per square mile (455.1/km^{2}). There were 564 housing units at an average density of 520.7 per square mile (201.6/km^{2}). The racial makeup of the city was 98.51% White, 0.24% African American, 0.16% Native American, 0.08% Asian, 0.55% from other races, and 0.47% from two or more races. Hispanic or Latino of any race were 1.34% of the population.

There were 533 households, out of which 24.8% had children under the age of 18 living with them, 46.9% were married couples living together, 6.8% had a female householder with no husband present, and 42.6% were non-families. 37.9% of all households were made up of individuals, and 21.2% had someone living alone who was 65 years of age or older. The average household size was 2.21 and the average family size was 2.92.

In the city, the population was spread out, with 21.7% under the age of 18, 7.1% from 18 to 24, 24.4% from 25 to 44, 18.2% from 45 to 64, and 28.5% who were 65 years of age or older. The median age was 42 years. For every 100 females, there were 85.0 males. For every 100 females age 18 and over, there were 85.7 males.

The median income for a household in the city was $30,769, and the median income for a family was $41,292. Males had a median income of $27,297 versus $20,750 for females. The per capita income for the city was $16,253. About 3.3% of families and 9.6% of the population were below the poverty line, including 13.2% of those under age 18 and 14.4% of those age 65 or over.

== Economy ==
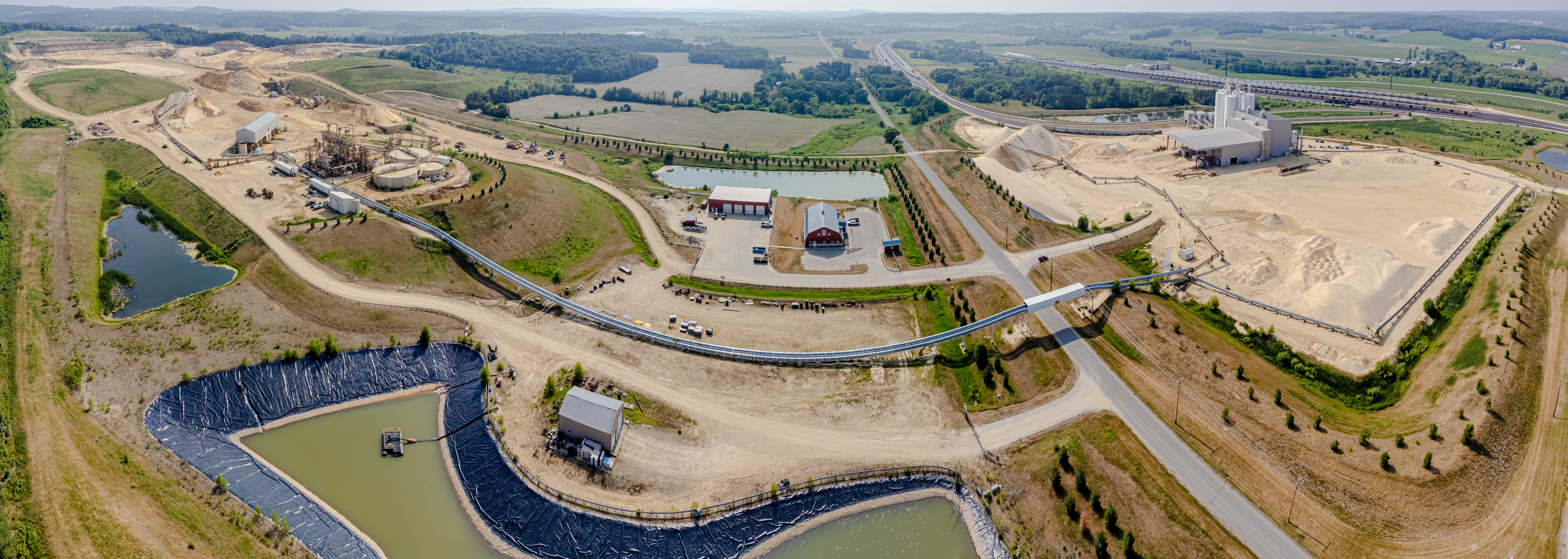
Frac sand facility in Blair

The local post office provides box service only. The local newspaper used to be The Blair Press.until it closed in 2019 when the owner died. The city's creamery, operated by the Associated Milk Producers, processes milk and produces cheese. In the past, Colby cheese was a staple, distributed by the Kraft company. The city's largest employers are the Public schools, Sand Mines, AMPI, and Grandview a Nursing home.

== Arts and culture ==
The local festival is the Cheese Fest, which takes place annually in mid-September. A city park and municipal swimming pool are located along Lake Henry. Blair has one Lutheran church and one Catholic church.
