= Trempealeau River =

River in Wisconsin, United States

Coordinates: 44.327037°N 91.454011°W

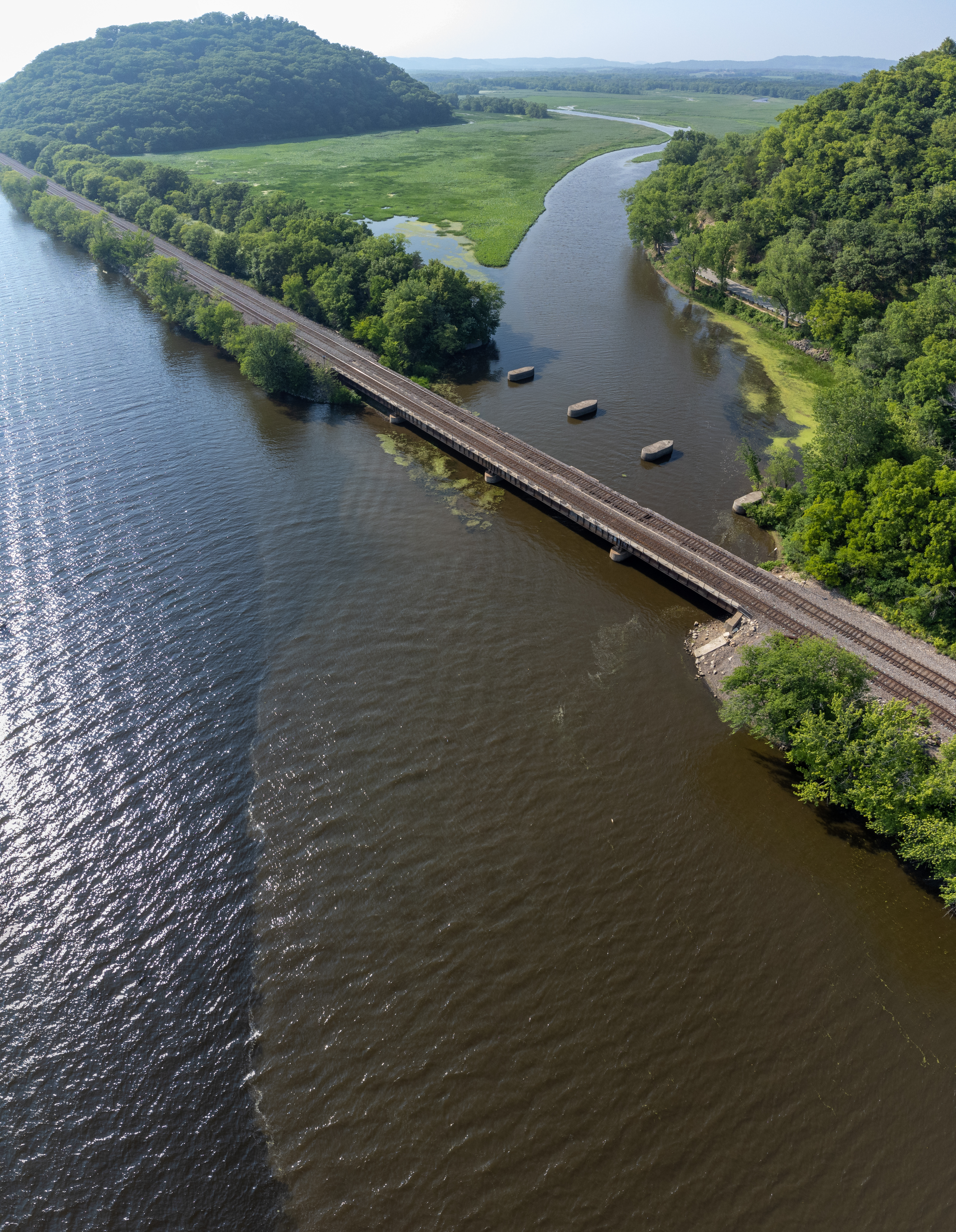
Trempealeau River confluence with Mississippi

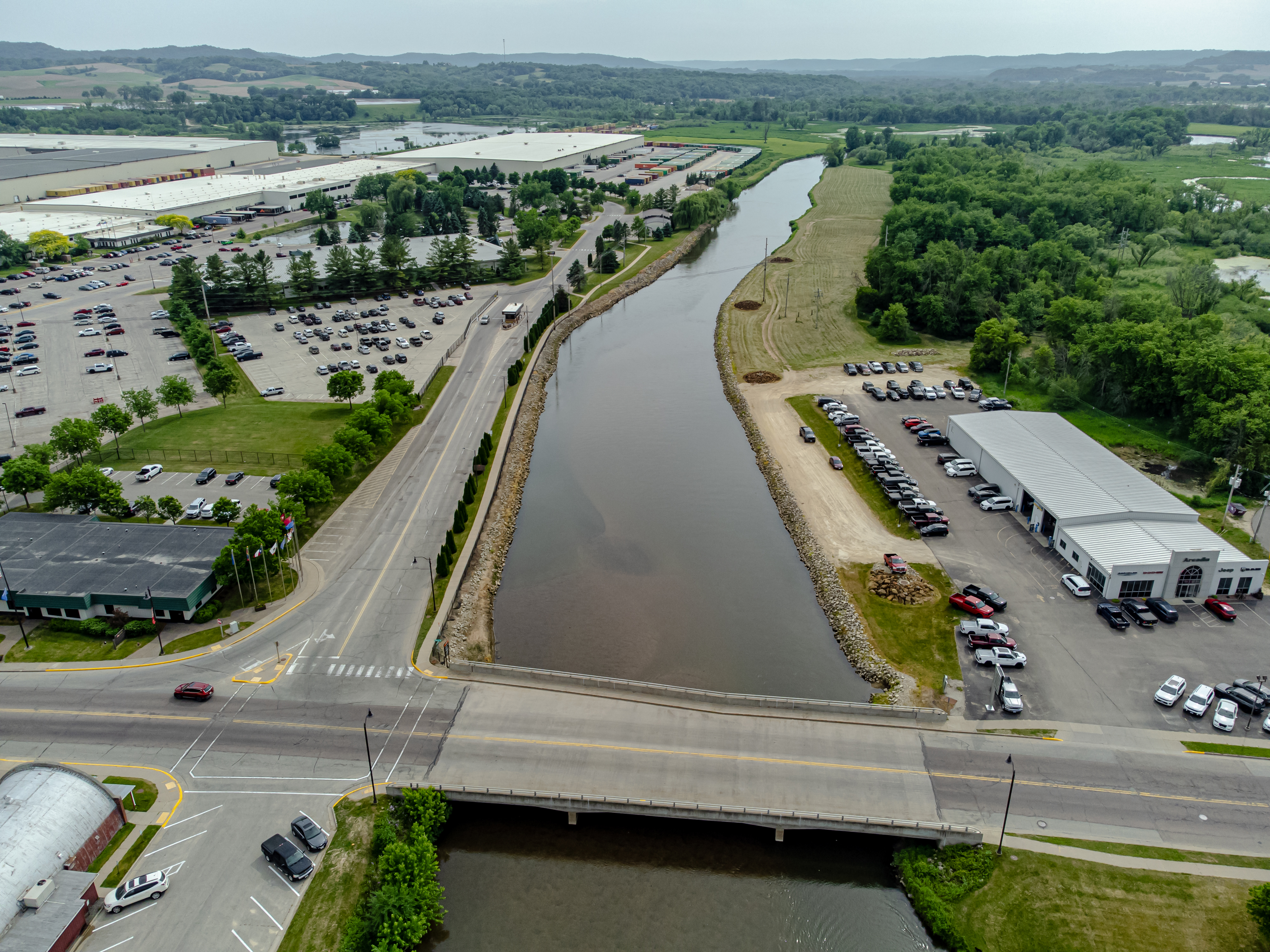
Trempealeau River in Arcadia

The Trempealeau River (pronounced TREM-puh-lo, from the French trempe à l'eau, dip in water) is an 81.5-mile-long (131.2 km) tributary of the Mississippi River in the Driftless Area of western Wisconsin in the United States.

== Course ==
The Trempealeau River rises in western Jackson County as two streams, its North and South Branches; the South Branch has at times been known as the main stem of the river, and the North Branch has at times been known as "Bovee Creek". The two streams join just east of Hixton, and the Trempealeau initially flows generally westwardly into Trempealeau County, past Hixton, Taylor, Blair, Whitehall and Independence. Near Independence, the river turns to the southwest and flows past Arcadia; in its lower course, it is used to define the boundary between Trempealeau and Buffalo counties. The Trempealeau flows into the Mississippi River just downstream of Winona, Minnesota at Perrot State Park.

== Gallery ==
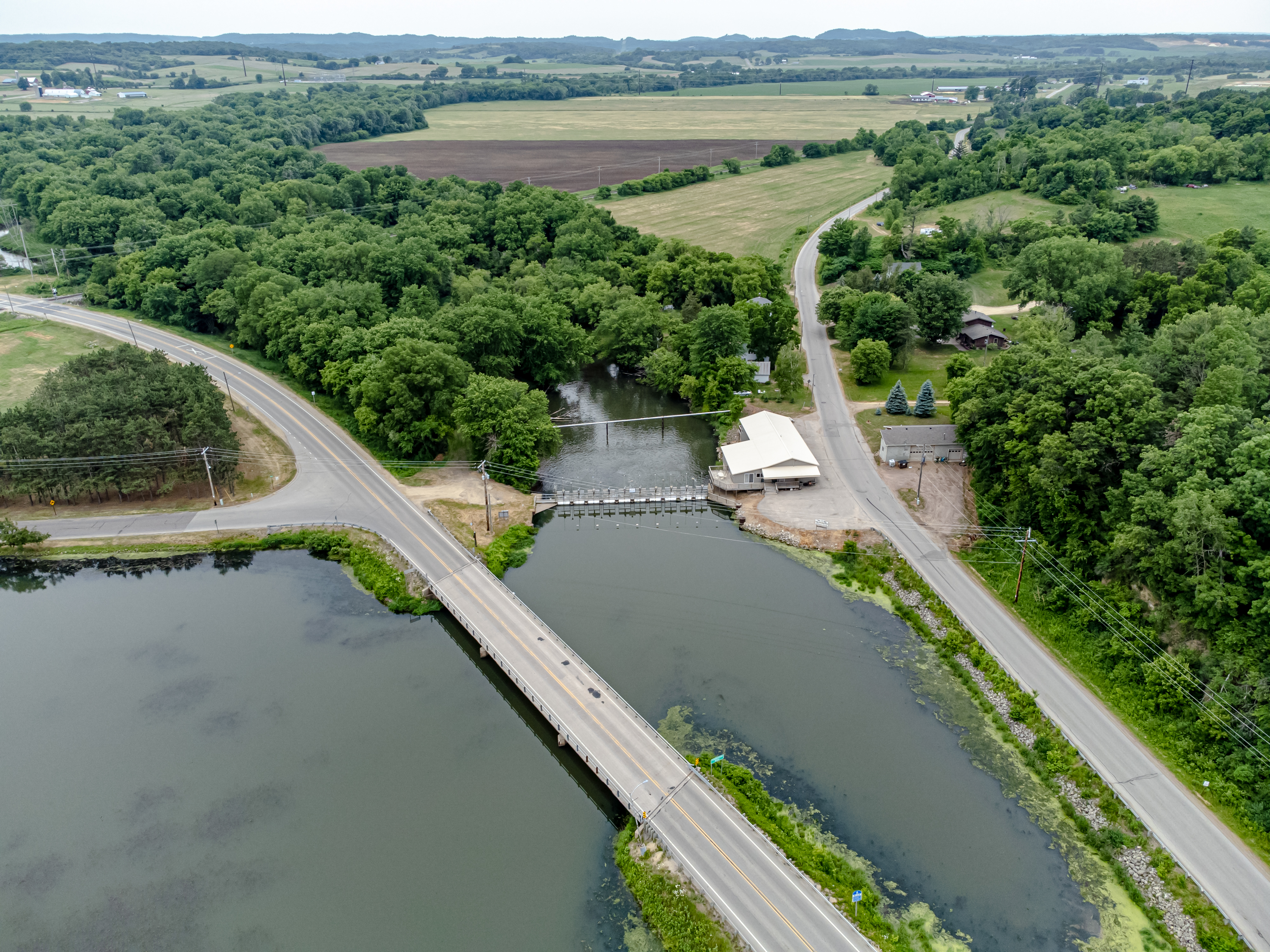
Lake Henry in Blair, Wisconsin, a dammed section of the Trempealeau River

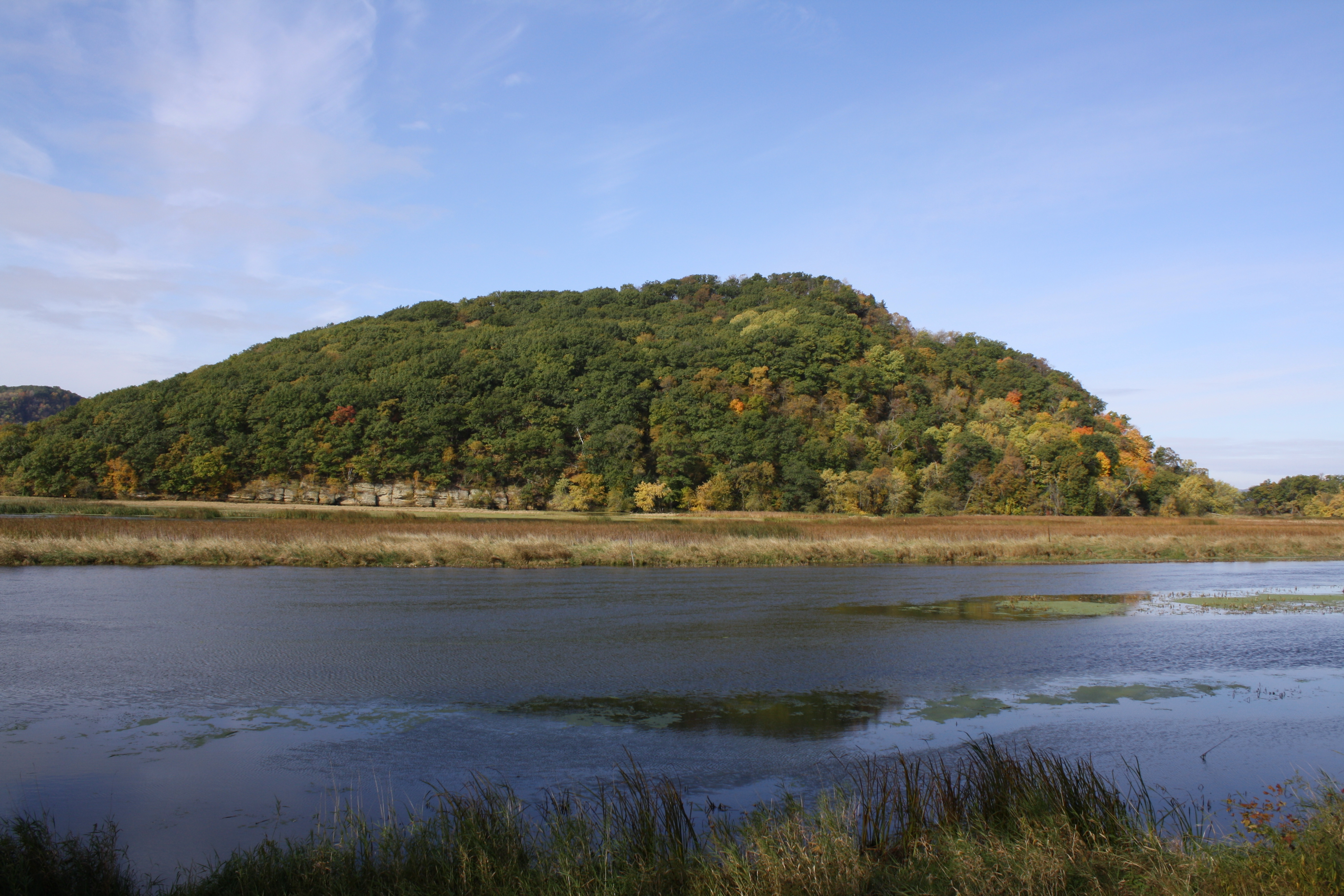
Trempealeau Mountain with the Trempealeau River in foreground

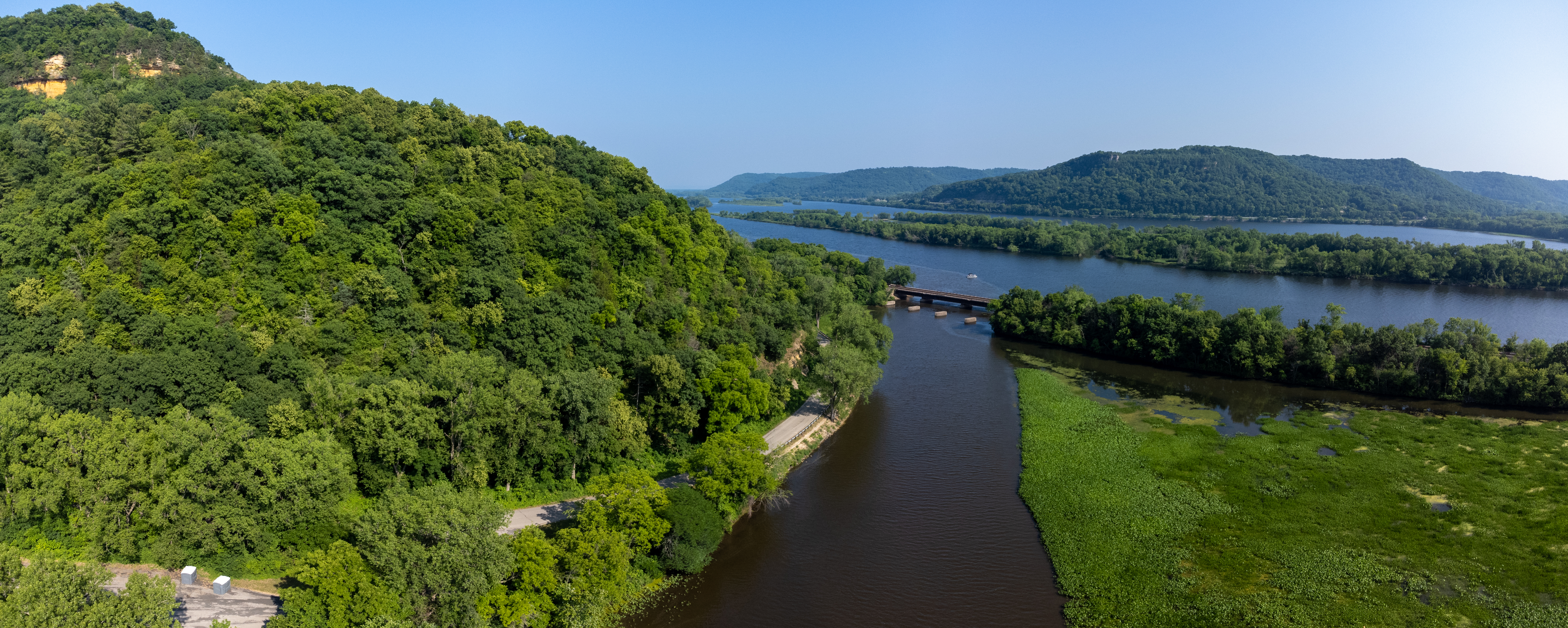
Trempealeau River confluence with Mississippi

== See also ==
- List of rivers of Wisconsin
