= Independence, Wisconsin =

- City
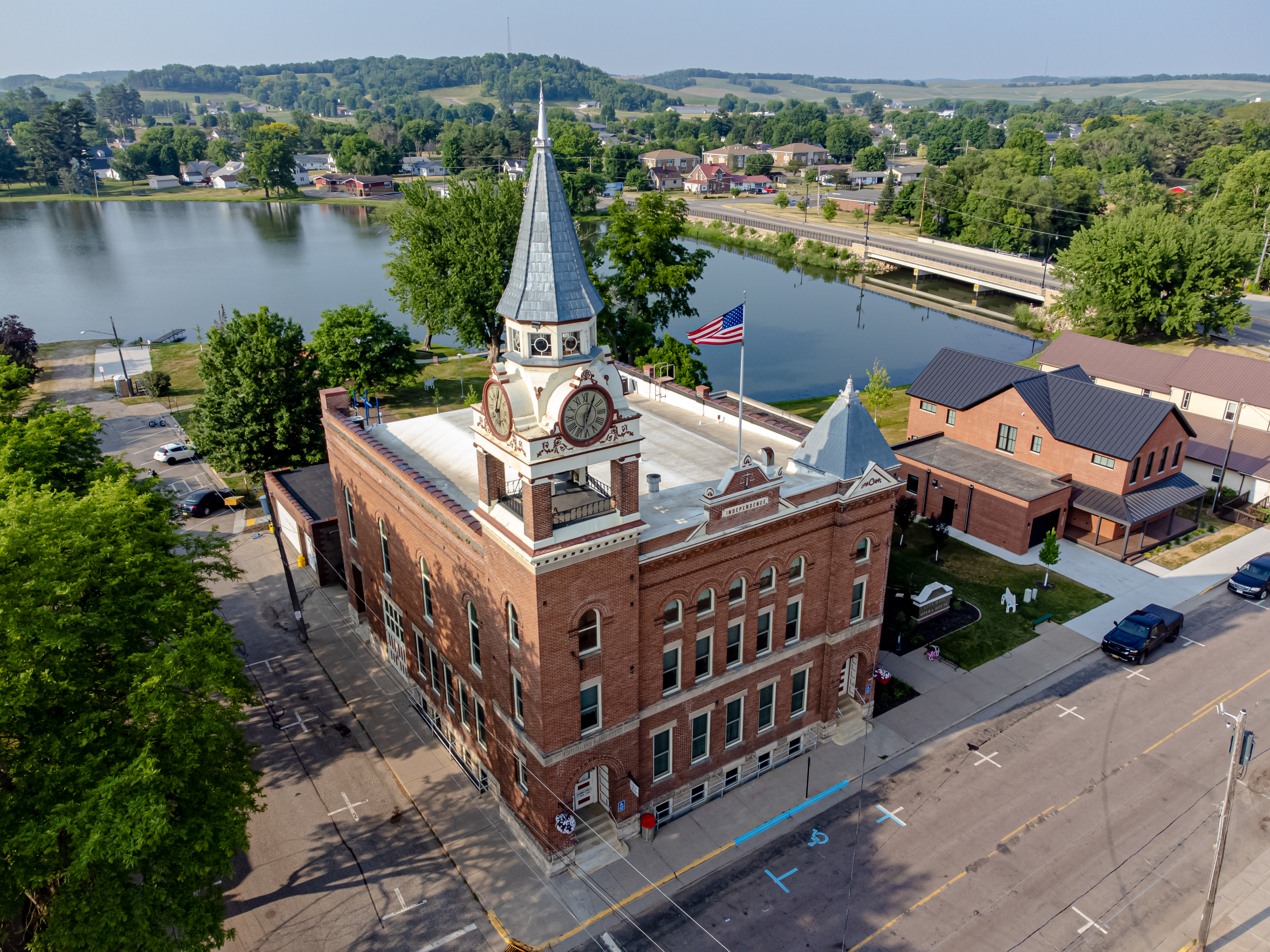
- Independence City Hall and Public Library

- Location of Independence in Trempealeau County, Wisconsin.

- Location within Wisconsin Location within the United States
- Coordinates: 44°21′30″N 91°25′20″W
- Country: United States
- State: Wisconsin
- County: Trempealeau

Area
  - Total: 4.22 sq mi (10.93 km^{2})
  - Land: 4.16 sq mi (10.78 km^{2})
  - Water: 0.054 sq mi (0.14 km^{2})
- Elevation: 781 ft (238 m)

Population (2020)
  - Total: 1,498
  - Density: 360/sq mi (138.9/km^{2})
- Time zone: UTC-6 (Central (CST))
  - Summer (DST): UTC-5 (CDT)
- Area codes: 715 & 534
- FIPS code: 55-36800
- GNIS feature ID: 1583429
- Website: www.independencewi.org

Independence is a city in Trempealeau County, Wisconsin, United States. The population was 1,498 at the 2020 census. It is located at the confluence of Elk Creek and the Trempealeau River.

== History ==
Unless otherwise noted, the history below is taken from a local historical album published for the city's centennial in 1976.

Independence is in the Town of Burnside, which corresponds with one of the townships created under the Land Ordinance of 1785. Shortly after the naming of Burnside in 1863, settlers from Europe and the Eastern United States began arriving in significant numbers.

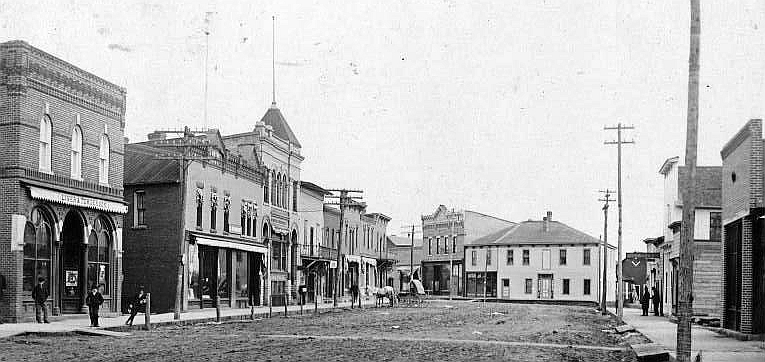
Looking east on Washington Street, 1900

The city of Independence owes its existence to a railroad and a man named David M. Kelly. Running almost parallel to the Trempealeau River is the Green Bay and Western Railroad, which is part of a line originally intended to run from Green Bay, Wisconsin to Wabasha, Minnesota. Kelly was an enthusiastic promoter of building a depot for the new line in Burnside.

After much disagreement and dispute over its location, Green Bay and Lake Pepin (as the company was then known) agreed to build a depot if $5,000 could be raised by the residents to finance construction. The money was raised, and Kelly bought the land for the depot in 1876. He founded a village on the land and named it Independence in honor of the nation's centennial of independence. The village was incorporated in 1885 and became a city in 1942.

Independence has outlived the depot that was once at its heart. The line began at Green Bay but eventually reached Winona, Minnesota instead of Wabasha. Passenger service was never very profitable. Under the inexorable pressure of the automobile, passenger service ended in 1949, but freight trains still use the line today.

== Geography ==
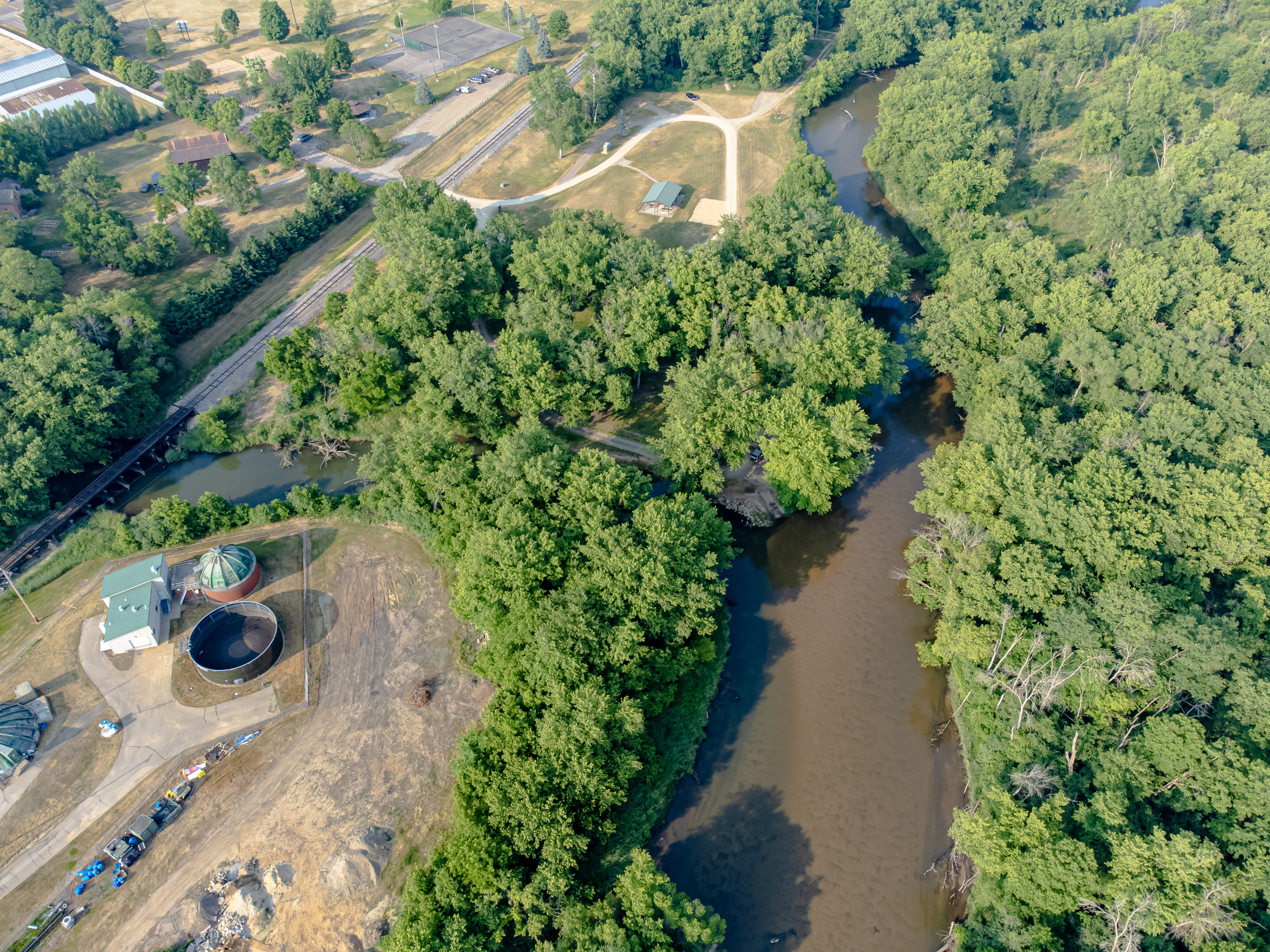
Elk Creek and Trempealeau River confluence

According to the United States Census Bureau, the city has a total area of 4.22 square miles (10.93 km^{2}), of which, 4.16 square miles (10.77 km^{2}) is land and 0.06 square miles (0.16 km^{2}) is water. It is within the Driftless Zone of the Midwest.

Just upstream from the intersection between Elk Creek and the Trempealeau is the dam impounding Bugle Lake. The present dam was built in 1935 as part of the Works Progress Administration. It replaced an earlier dam that had been built by a resident named W.S. Newton. It later broke and flooded all of Arcadia, Wisconsin in 2011. Bugle Lake has peaceful canoeing, and a small park covers the island in the lake.

== Demographics ==
Historical population
Census	Pop.	Note	%±
1880	365		—
1890	382		4.7%
1900	630		64.9%
1910	664		5.4%
1920	805		21.2%
1930	866		7.6%
1940	1,036		19.6%
1950	1,088		5.0%
1960	954		−12.3%
1970	1,036		8.6%
1980	1,180		13.9%
1990	1,041		−11.8%
2000	1,244		19.5%
2010	1,336		7.4%
2020	1,498		12.1%
U.S. Decennial Census

=== 2020 census ===
As of the census of 2020, the population was 1,498. The population density was 359.8 inhabitants per square mile (138.9/km^{2}). There were 681 housing units at an average density of 163.6 per square mile (63.2/km^{2}). The racial makeup of the city was 68.6% White, 1.8% Native American, 1.0% Black or African American, 0.3% Asian, 17.4% from other races, and 10.9% from two or more races. Ethnically, the population was 32.3% Hispanic or Latino of any race.

=== 2010 census ===
As of the census of 2010, there were 1,336 people, 606 households, and 352 families residing in the city. The population density was 1,052.0 inhabitants per square mile (406.2/km^{2}). There were 676 housing units at an average density of 532.3 per square mile (205.5/km^{2}). The racial makeup of the city was 88.6% White, 0.1% African American, 0.1% Native American, 0.4% Asian, 9.9% from other races, and 1.0% from two or more races. Hispanic or Latino of any race were 12.9% of the population.

There were 606 households, of which 29.0% had children under the age of 18 living with them, 37.8% were married couples living together, 11.9% had a female householder with no husband present, 8.4% had a male householder with no wife present, and 41.9% were non-families. 34.2% of all households were made up of individuals, and 13.3% had someone living alone who was 65 years of age or older. The average household size was 2.20 and the average family size was 2.74.

The median age in the city was 37.7 years. 22.3% of residents were under the age of 18; 10.4% were between the ages of 18 and 24; 25.6% were from 25 to 44; 25% were from 45 to 64; and 16.7% were 65 years of age or older. The gender makeup of the city was 51.9% male and 48.1% female.

=== 2000 census ===
As of the census of 2000, there were 1,244 people, 581 households, and 317 families residing in the city. The population density was 978.8 people per square mile (378.2/km^{2}). There were 619 housing units at an average density of 487.0 per square mile (188.2/km^{2}). The racial makeup of the city was 98.47% White, 0.16% African American, 0.16% Native American, 0.88% from other races, and 0.32% from two or more races. Hispanic or Latino of any race were 1.61% of the population.

There were 581 households, out of which 26.2% had children under the age of 18 living with them, 42.2% were married couples living together, 9.3% had a female householder with no husband present, and 45.4% were non-families. 38.7% of all households were made up of individuals, and 20.1% had someone living alone who was 65 years of age or older. The average household size was 2.13 and the average family size was 2.86.

In the city, the population was spread out, with 21.9% under the age of 18, 8.7% from 18 to 24, 27.0% from 25 to 44, 20.0% from 45 to 64, and 22.4% who were 65 years of age or older. The median age was 40 years. For every 100 females, there were 101.3 males. For every 100 females age 18 and over, there were 97.2 males.

The median income for a household in the city was $27,389, and the median income for a family was $41,691. Males had a median income of $26,389 versus $21,065 for females. The per capita income for the city was $15,977. About 6.2% of families and 9.6% of the population were below the poverty line, including 7.2% of those under age 18 and 18.5% of those age 65 or over.

== Gallery ==
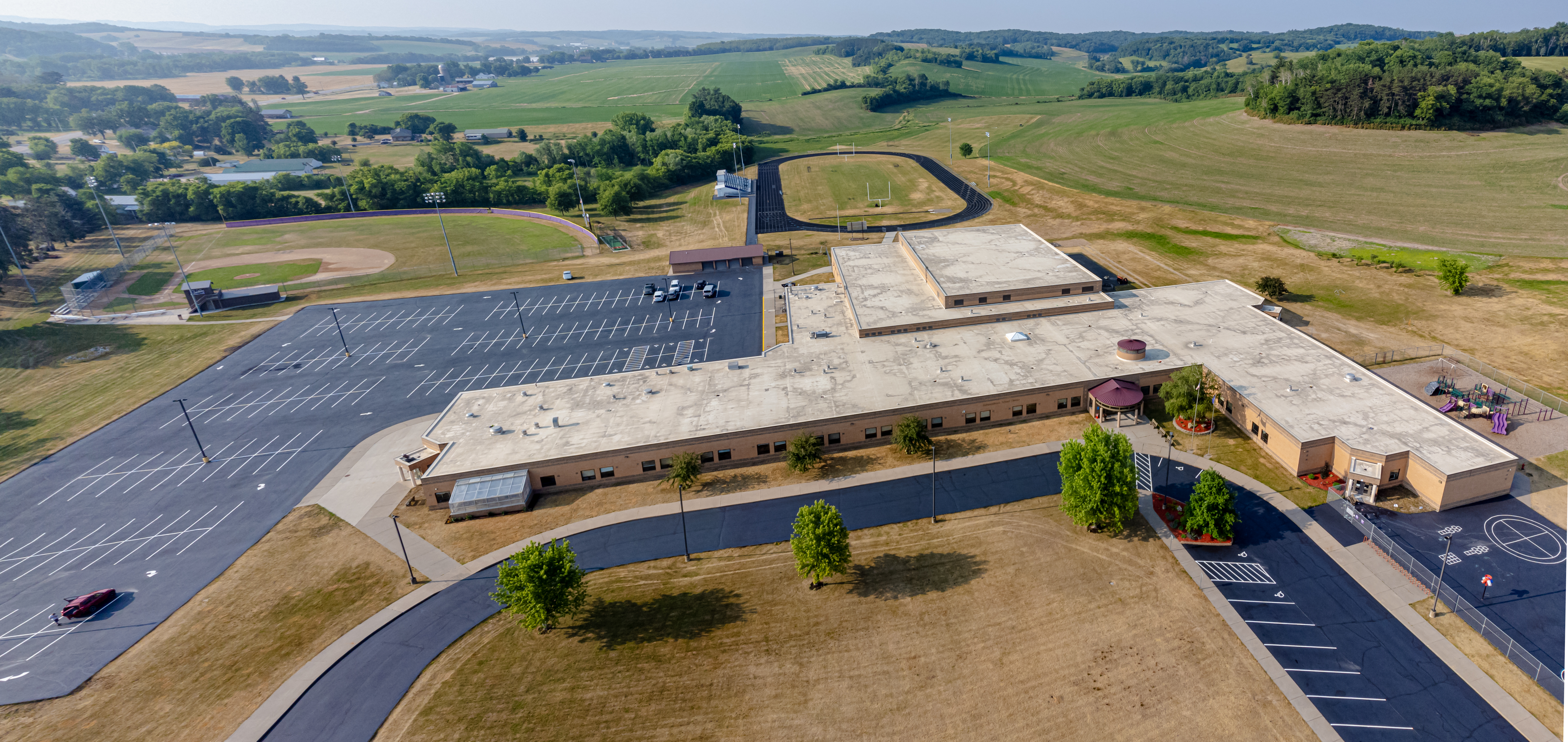
Independence schools

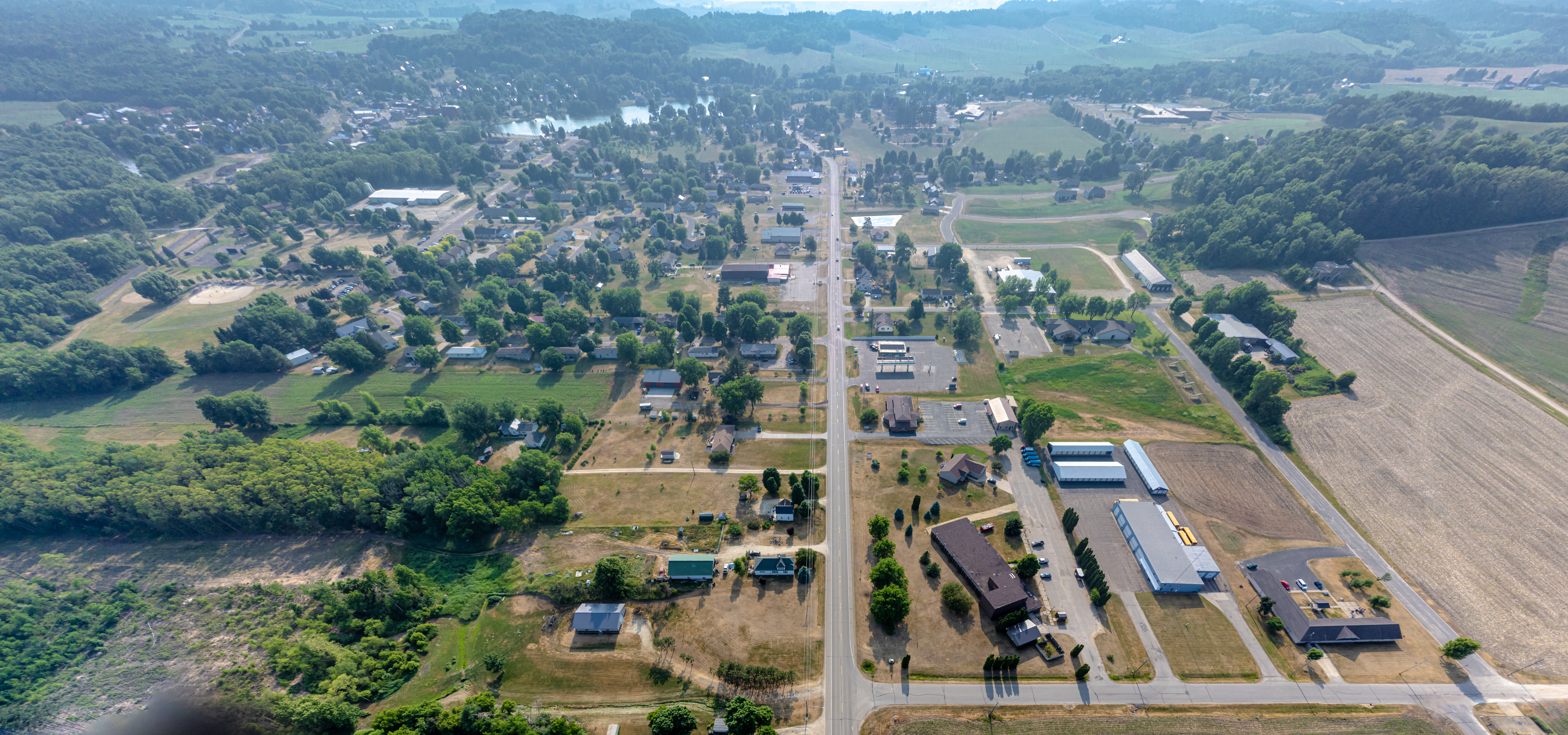
Independence from the air

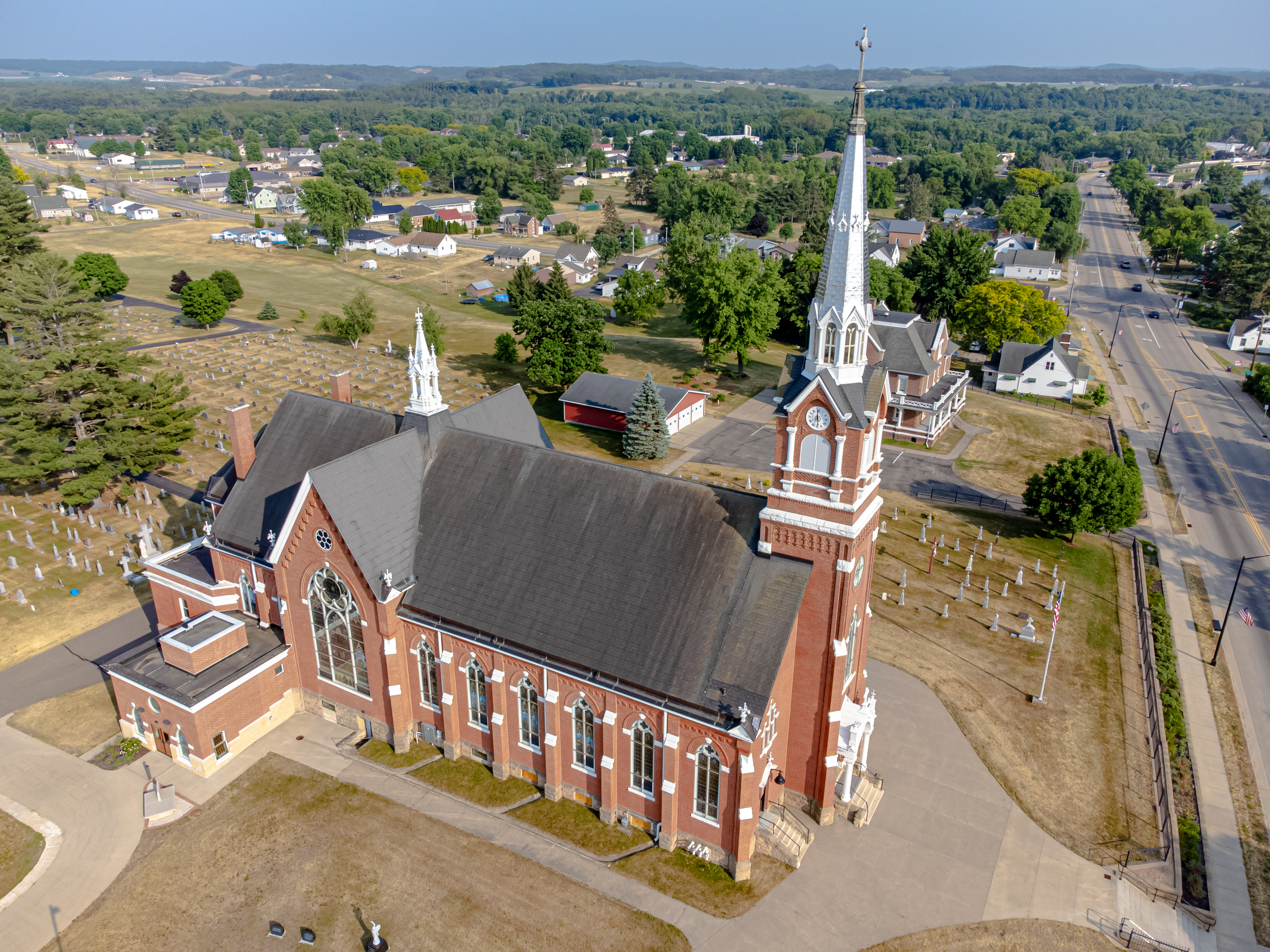
Independence Church SS Peter & Paul Catholic Church

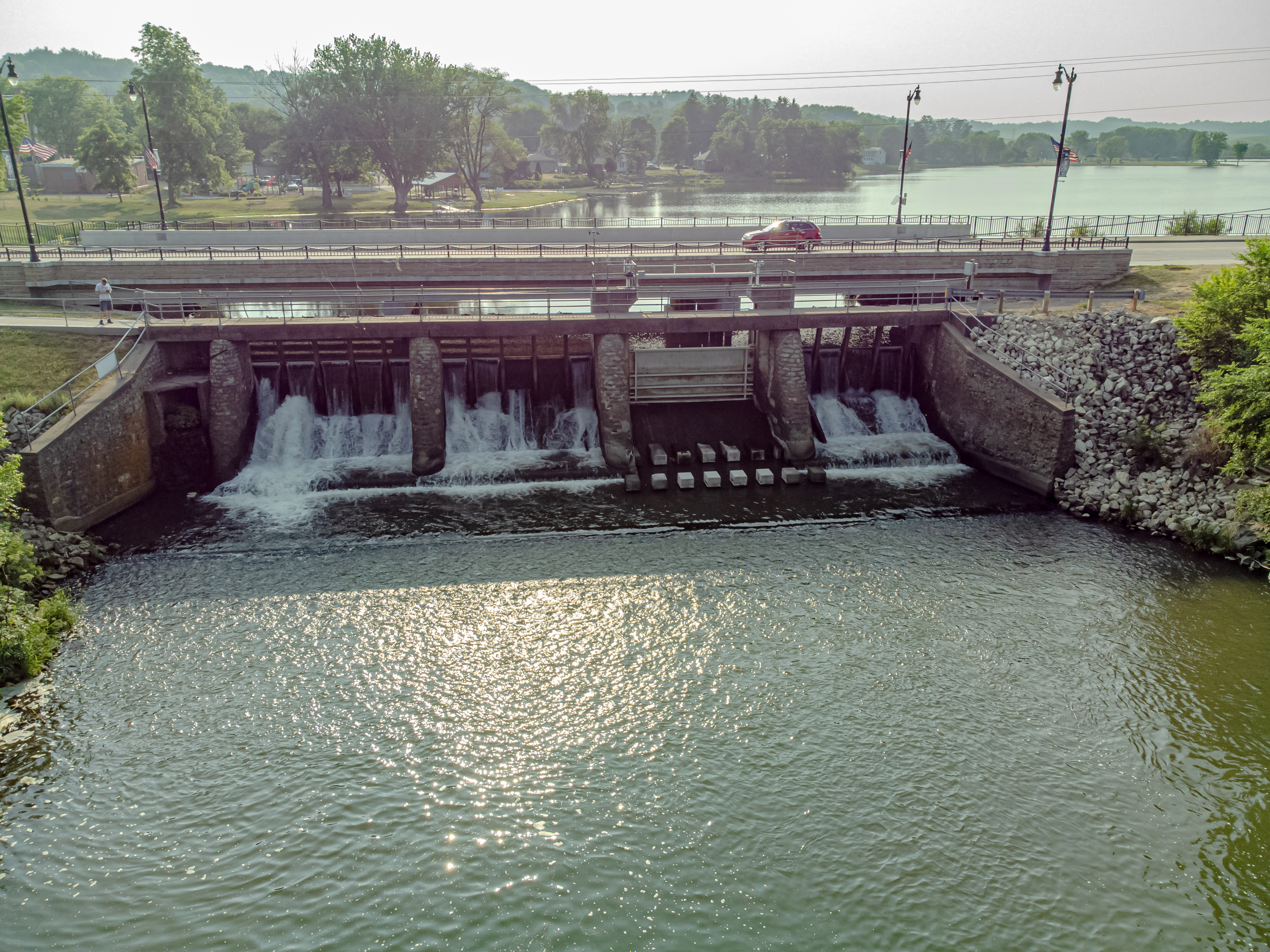
Bugle Lake dam

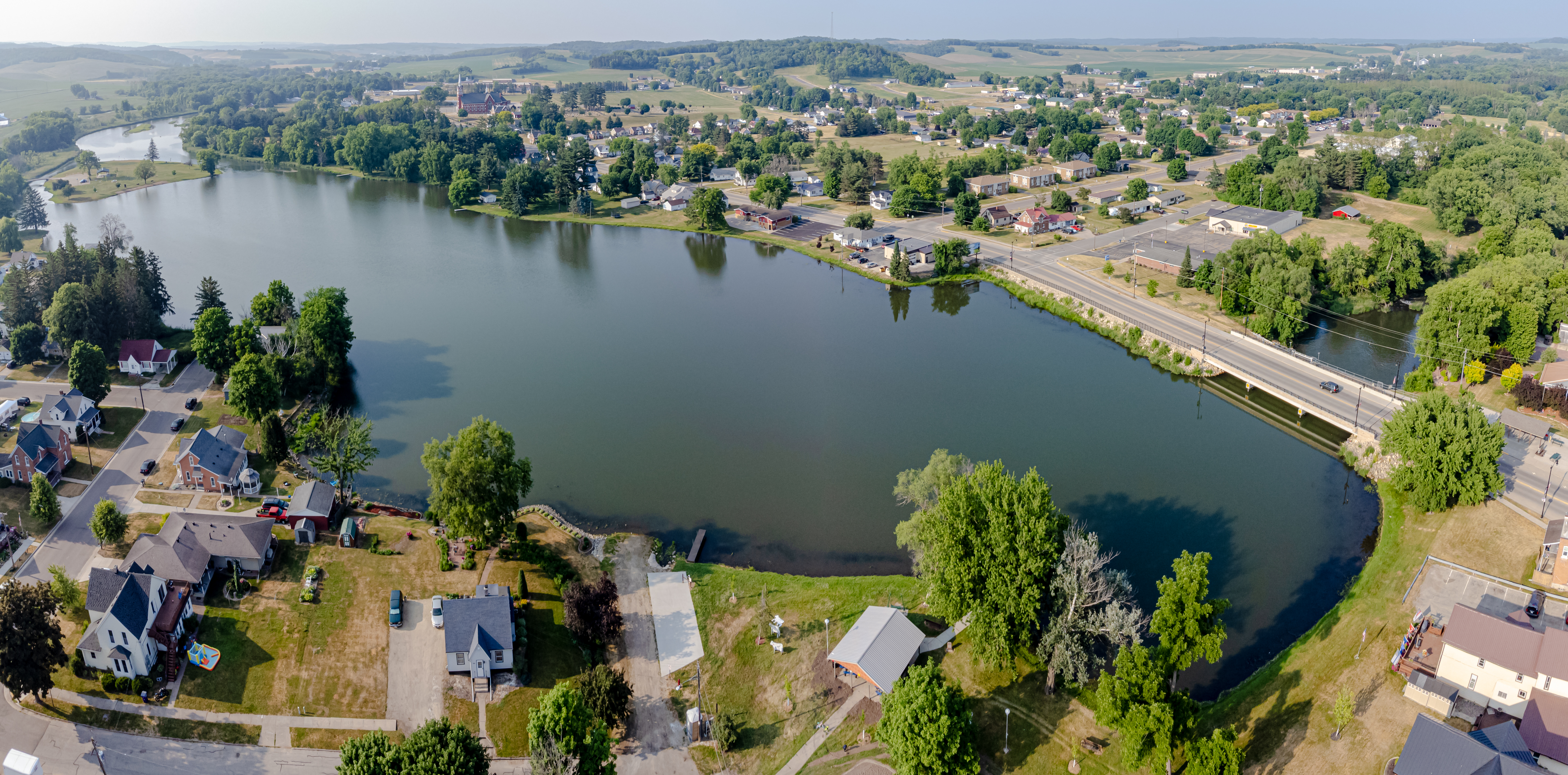
Bugle Lake

== Notable people ==
- Grover L. Broadfoot, chief justice of the Wisconsin Supreme Court
- Leo Ferdinand Dworschak, Roman Catholic Bishop of the Roman Catholic Diocese of Fargo
- George H. Markham, Wisconsin State Representative
- William H. Markham, Wisconsin State Senator

== See also ==
- List of cities in Wisconsin
