= School District of Alma Center-Humbird-Merrillan =

School district in Wisconsin, USA

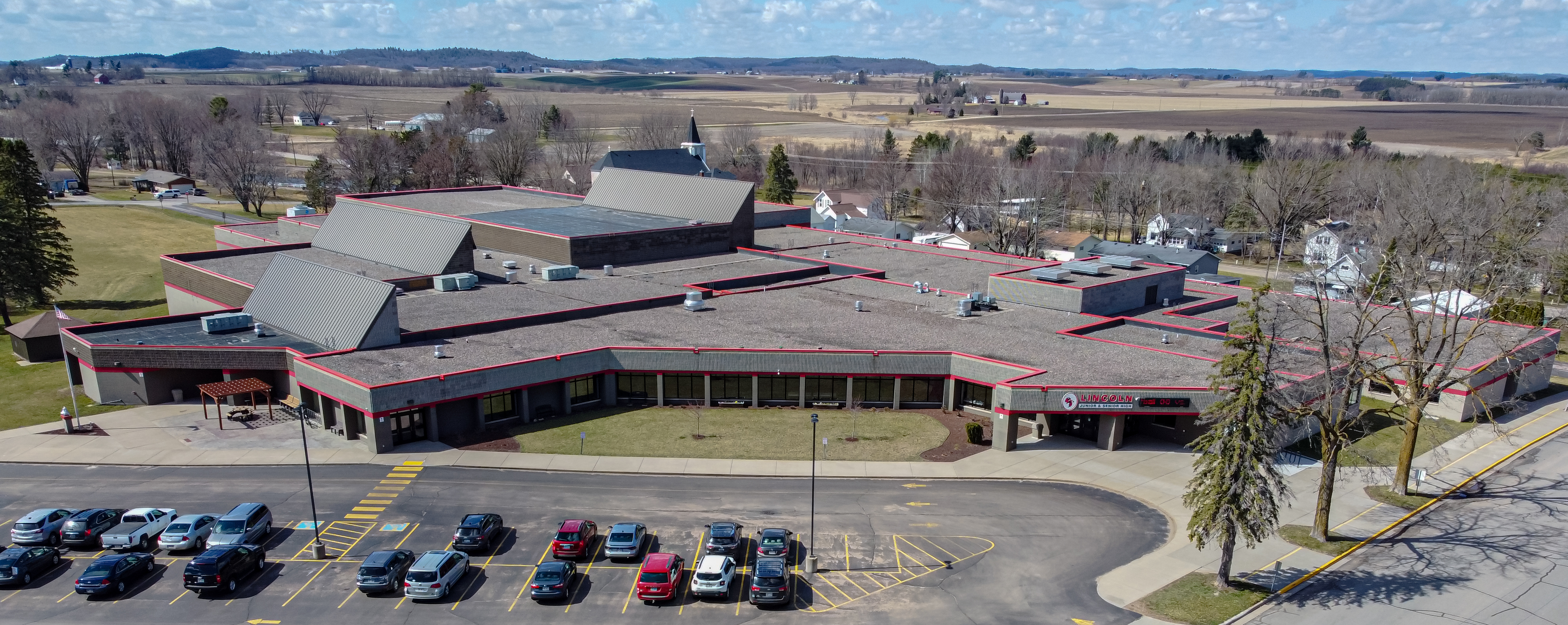
- Lincoln High/Middle School

Address
- 124 South School Street Alma Center, Wisconsin, 54611; United States

District information
- Type: Public
- Grades: PreK–12
- NCES District ID: 5500210

Students and staff
- Students: 601
- Teachers: 44.82
- Staff: 36.34
- Student–teacher ratio: 13.41

Other information
- Website: www.lincolnhornets.org

School District of Alma Center-Humbird-Merrillan is a school district headquartered in Alma Center, Wisconsin. It operates Lincoln Elementary School in Merrillan and Lincoln Junior-Senior High School in Alma Center. It also serves Humbird.

== Gallery ==
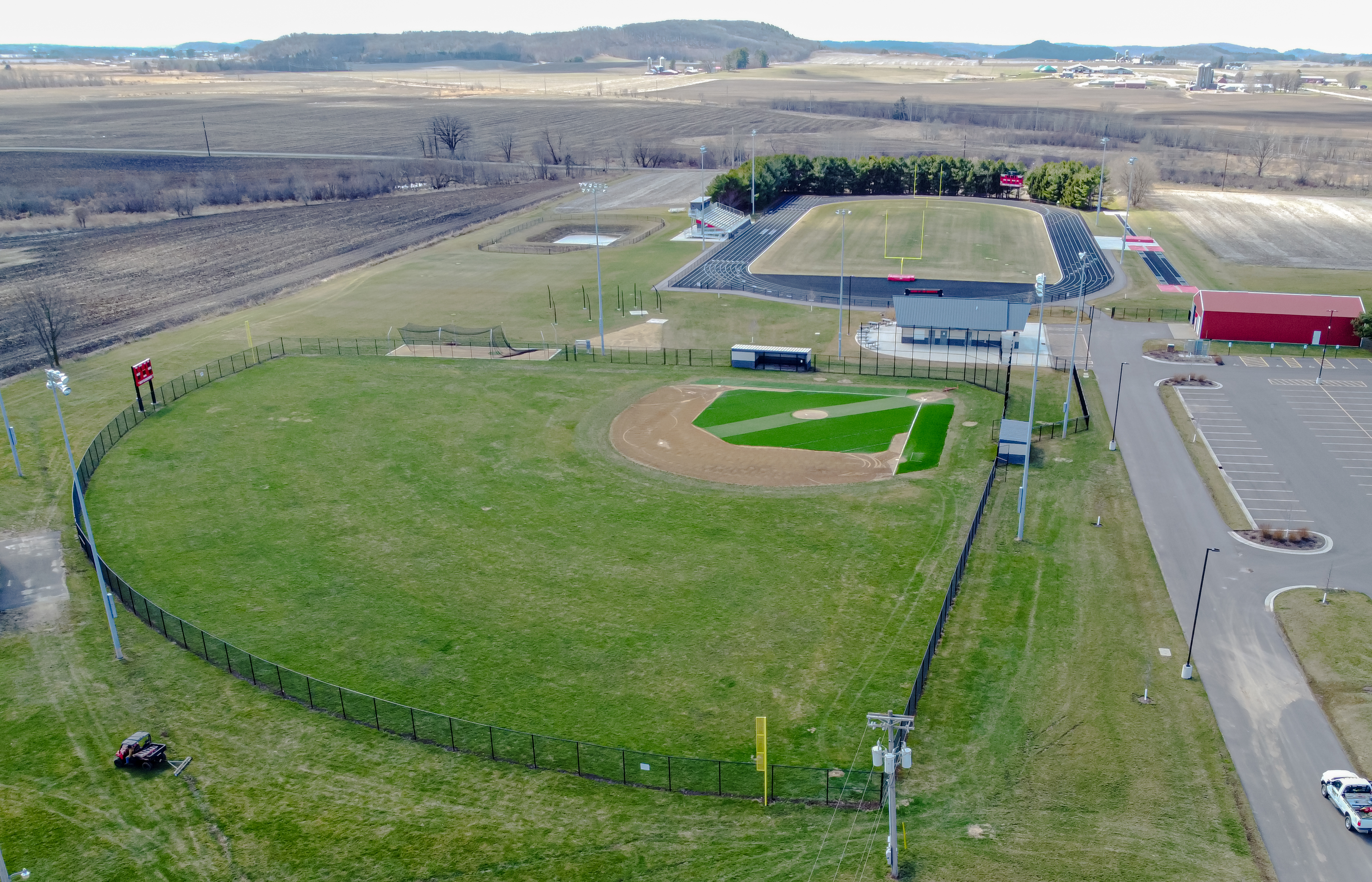
Alma Center High School sports fields

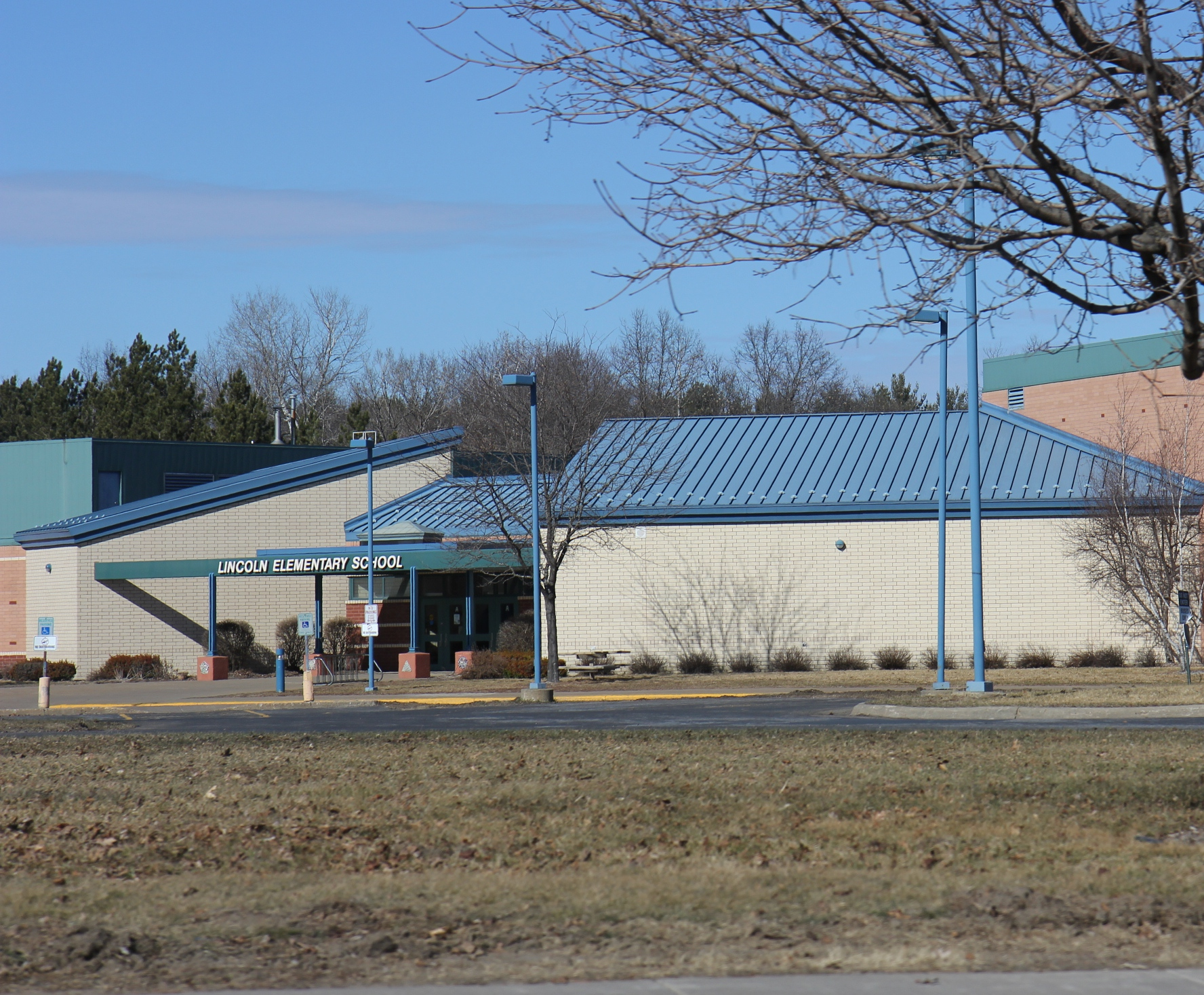
Lincoln Elementary School
