= Alma Center, Wisconsin =

- Village
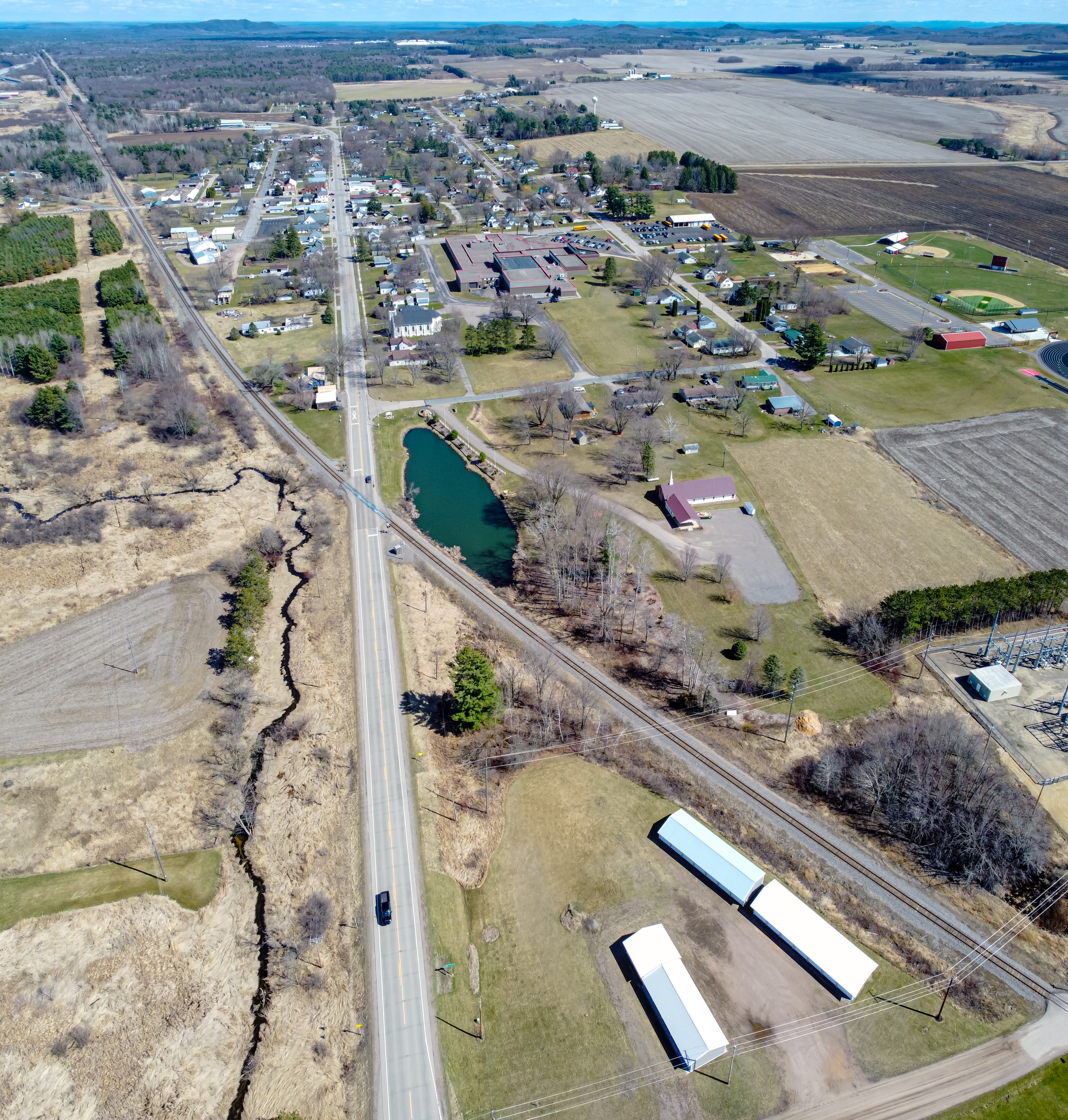
- Wis-95 and the CN Railway run through town
- Nickname: Strawberry Capital of Wisconsin
- Location of Alma Center in Jackson County, Wisconsin.
- Coordinates: 44°26′17″N 90°54′43″W
- Country: United States
- State: Wisconsin
- County: Jackson

Area
  - Total: 1.00 sq mi (2.60 km^{2})
  - Land: 1.00 sq mi (2.60 km^{2})
  - Water: 0 sq mi (0.00 km^{2})
- Elevation: 981 ft (299 m)

Population (2020)
  - Total: 487
  - Density: 485/sq mi (187/km^{2})
- Time zone: UTC-6 (Central (CST))
  - Summer (DST): UTC-5 (CDT)
- Area codes: 715 & 534
- FIPS code: 55-01300
- GNIS feature ID: 1560797
- Website: https://almacenterwi.gov

Alma Center is a village in Jackson County, Wisconsin, United States. The population was 487 at the 2020 census. The village is located within the Town of Alma.

== Geography ==
Alma Center is located at 44°26′17″N 90°54′43″W (44.438046, -90.911890).

According to the United States Census Bureau, the village has a total area of 1.00 square mile (2.59 km^{2}), all land.

== Demographics ==
Historical population
Census	Pop.	Note	%±
1880	170		—
1910	417		—
1920	461		10.6%
1930	383		−16.9%
1940	431		12.5%
1950	441		2.3%
1960	464		5.2%
1970	495		6.7%
1980	454		−8.3%
1990	416		−8.4%
2000	446		7.2%
2010	503		12.8%
2020	487		−3.2%
U.S. Decennial Census

=== 2010 census ===
As of the census of 2010, there were 503 people, 205 households, and 143 families living in the village. The population density was 503.0 inhabitants per square mile (194.2/km^{2}). There were 229 housing units at an average density of 229.0 per square mile (88.4/km^{2}). The racial makeup of the village was 92.8% White, 0.2% Native American, 0.2% Asian, 0.2% Pacific Islander, 4.4% from other races, and 2.2% from two or more races. Hispanic or Latino of any race were 6.4% of the population.

There were 205 households, of which 39.0% had children under the age of 18 living with them, 50.7% were married couples living together, 14.6% had a female householder with no husband present, 4.4% had a male householder with no wife present, and 30.2% were non-families. 24.9% of all households were made up of individuals, and 13.7% had someone living alone who was 65 years of age or older. The average household size was 2.45 and the average family size was 2.89.

The median age in the village was 37.1 years. 29.4% of residents were under the age of 18; 5.1% were between the ages of 18 and 24; 27.3% were from 25 to 44; 23.5% were from 45 to 64; and 14.9% were 65 years of age or older. The gender makeup of the village was 46.1% male and 53.9% female.

=== 2000 census ===
As of the census of 2000, there were 446 people, 191 households, and 123 families living in the village. The population density was 442.5 people per square mile (170.5/km^{2}). There were 214 housing units at an average density of 212.3 per square mile (81.8/km^{2}). The racial makeup of the village was 97.53% White, 1.12% Native American, 1.35% from other races. Hispanic or Latino of any race were 1.57% of the population.

There were 191 households, out of which 27.2% had children under the age of 18 living with them, 53.9% were married couples living together, 7.3% had a female householder with no husband present, and 35.6% were non-families. 29.3% of all households were made up of individuals, and 19.4% had someone living alone who was 65 years of age or older. The average household size was 2.34 and the average family size was 2.86.

In the village, the population was spread out, with 23.3% under the age of 18, 7.2% from 18 to 24, 28.0% from 25 to 44, 19.1% from 45 to 64, and 22.4% who were 65 years of age or older. The median age was 39 years. For every 100 females, there were 90.6 males. For every 100 females age 18 and over, there were 91.1 males.

The median income for a household in the village was $27,404, and the median income for a family was $40,625. Males had a median income of $31,364 versus $17,250 for females. The per capita income for the village was $16,142. About 4.6% of families and 9.8% of the population were below the poverty line, including 2.1% of those under age 18 and 16.7% of those age 65 or over.

== Education ==
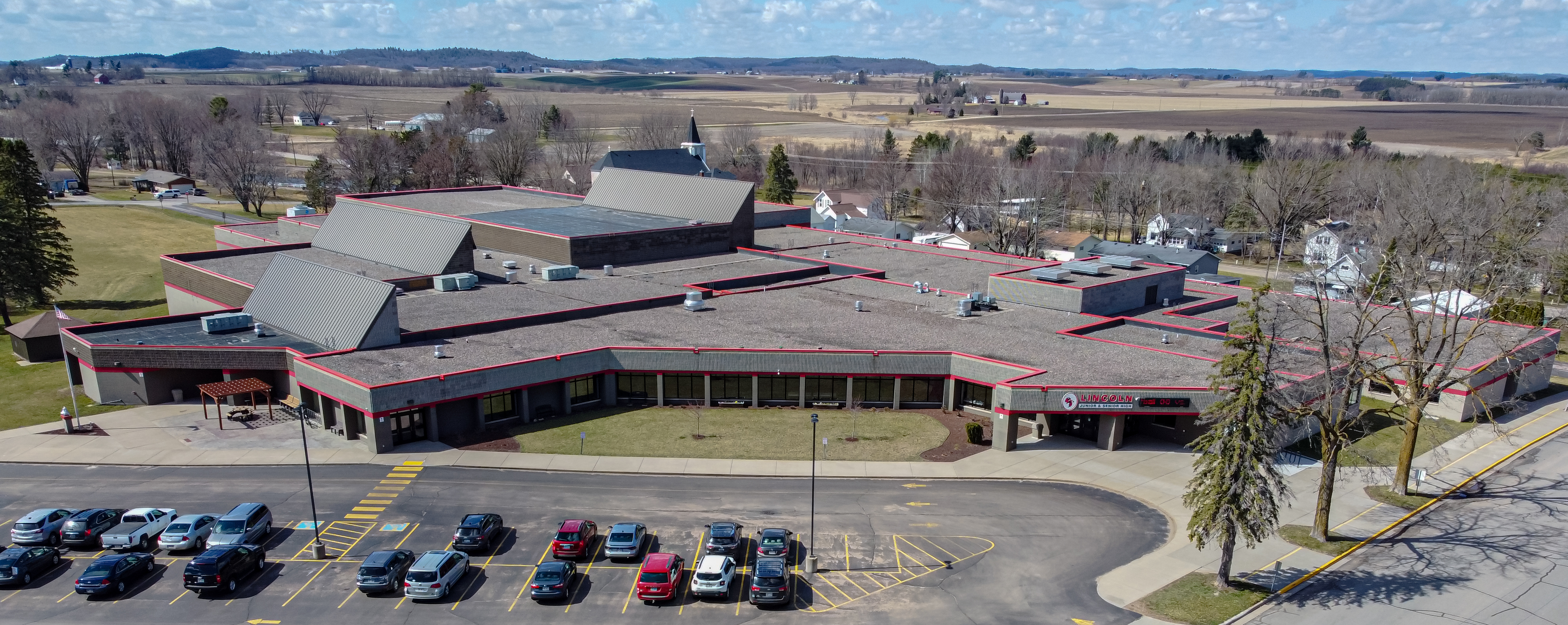
Alma Center High/Middle School

School District of Alma Center-Humbird-Merrillan operates public schools.

One of the first schoolhouses was located at 236 East Main Street. The M.J. Chapmans bought the house in the 1880s and remodeled it into a home.

In 1949 the schools of the Humbird, Merrillan, and Alma Center consolidated and all high school students were transported to Alma Center. A $300,000 addition was added to Lincoln High School on September 8, 1968. Another addition was added in 1975 for $1.2 million. In 1995 the original three-story school was demolished. In 2011, a $13 million referendum was approved for a reconstruction and addition to the school.

== Notable people ==
- Addison W. Merrill - Wisconsin State Representative
- Jerome B. Miller - Wisconsin State Representative

== Images ==
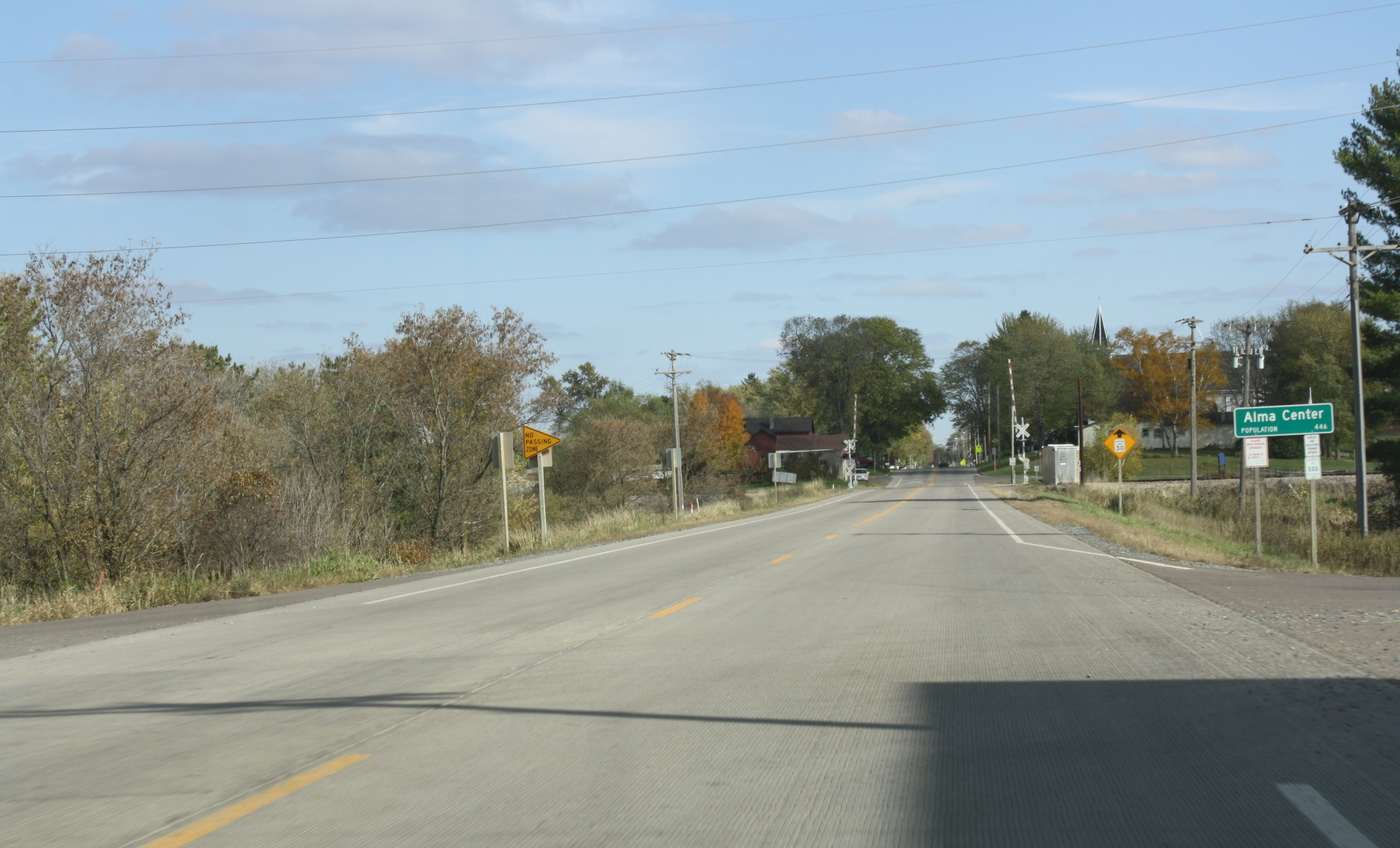
Looking east at the WIS 95 sign

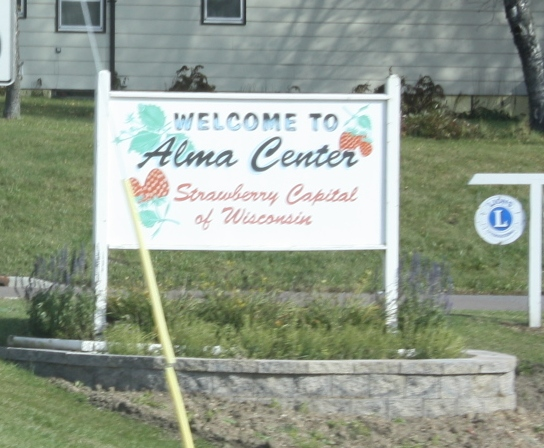
City welcome sign

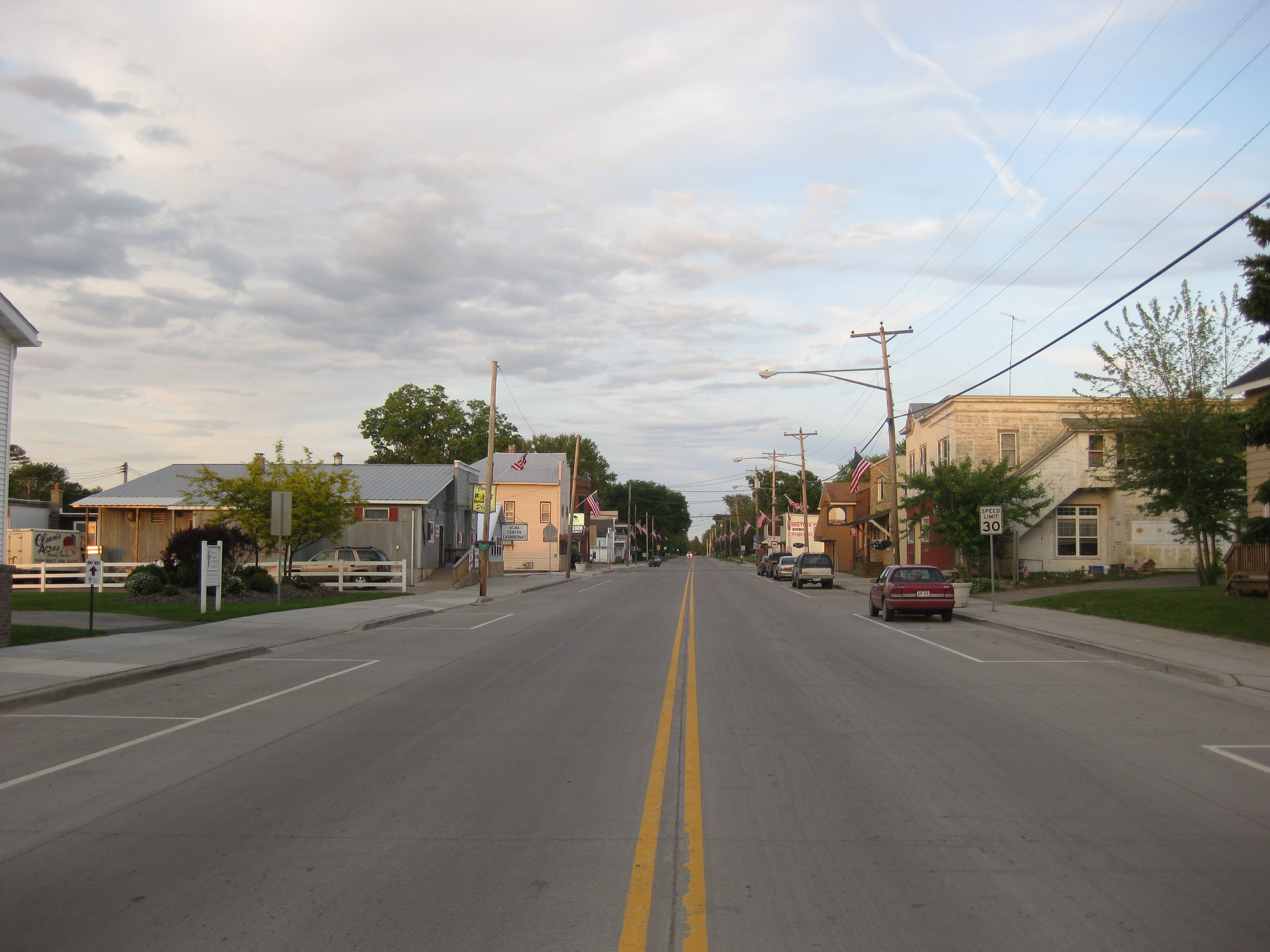
Downtown Alma Center

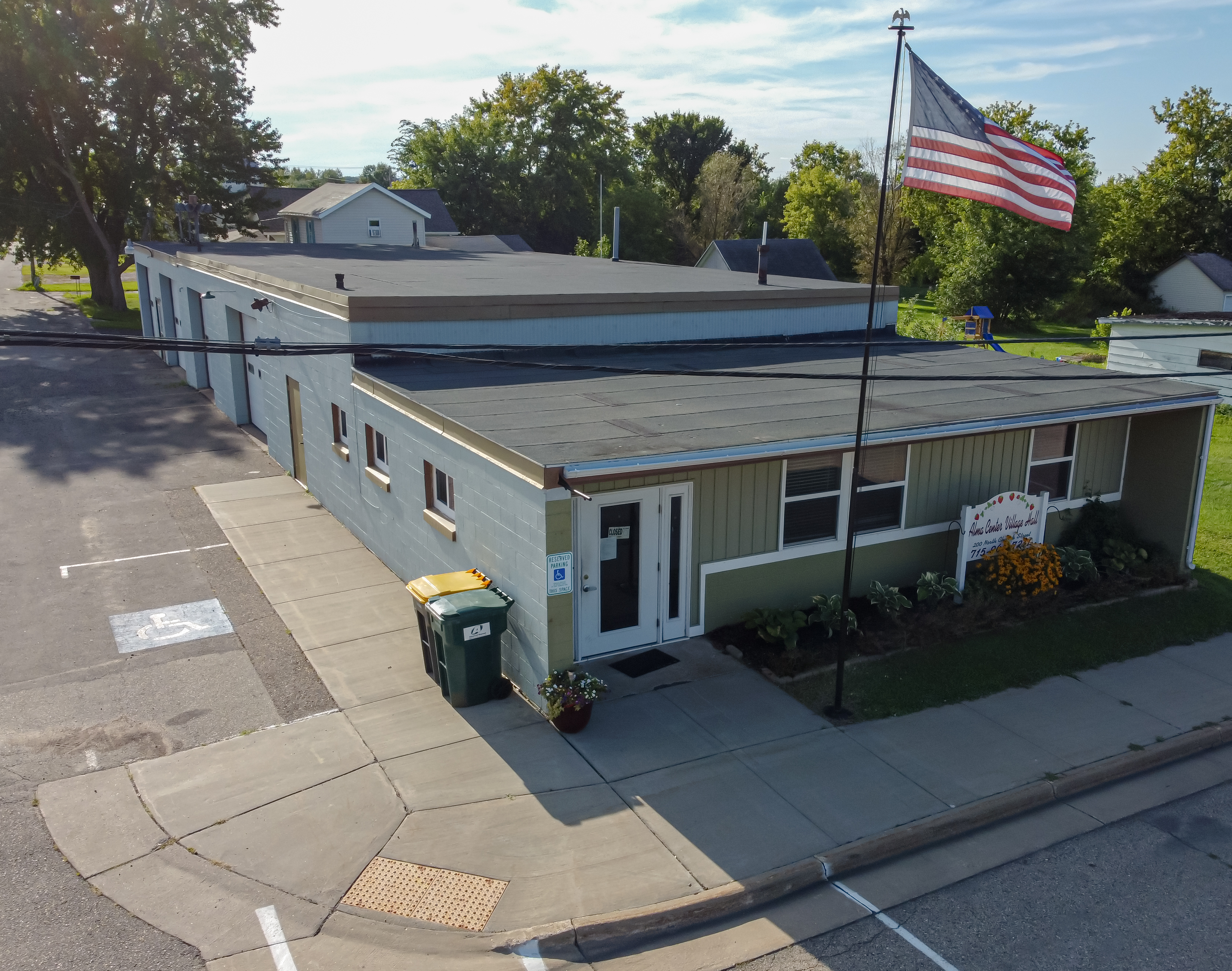
Village hall
