= Chuck Hockenbery =

American baseball player (born 1950)

- Pitcher
- Born: December 15, 1950 (age 74); La Crosse, Wisconsin, US
- Batted: Switch Threw: Right

MLB debut
- July 4, 1975, for the California Angels

Last MLB appearance
- September 15, 1975, for the California Angels

MLB statistics
- Win–loss record: 0–5
- Earned run average: 5.27
- Strikeouts: 15
- Stats at Baseball Reference

Teams
- California Angels (1975)

Charles Marion Hockenbery (born December 15, 1950) is an American former professional baseball player who played one season, 1975, for the California Angels of Major League Baseball. He coached the Onalaska Legion baseball team and at the Onalaska High School after retiring from the Major League.

== Early life ==
Hockenbery was born in La Crosse, Wisconsin, on December 15, 1950, to Mr. and Mrs. Gordon Hockenbery. He lived in Onalaska, Wisconsin, for most of his life. Hockenbery began playing baseball as a child in 1961 in Onalaska's Pee Wee League. He continued playing baseball as a pitcher while he was enrolled in high school. In 1969, he was part of a relay team and was a record holding league jumper.

== Professional career ==
In 1969, Hockenbery graduated from high school and signed on as a free agent with the California Angels in July of that year. He was assigned to the Midwest League in Davenport, Iowa, by the Angels. After recovering from an injury while playing in Davenport, he pitched for the Pioneer League in Idaho Falls. Hockenbery then pitched for the Bend Rainbows in Oregon. He was then changed to the position of short reliever. Hockenbery played in the California League in 1972 and was promoted to AA ball at Shreveport, Louisiana as part of the Shreveport Captains. He was later part of the Angels 40-man roster as a pitcher in the Arizona Instructional League in Phoenix, Arizona. In 1973, Hockenbery continued to play AA ball by playing with El Paso, Texas, in the Texas League. He then played AAA ball and played in Salt Lake City as part of the Pacific Coast League. He played at Mayagüez, Puerto Rico during the winter season until he was declared as being disabled when his right elbow had a pinched nerve.

In May 1975, Hockenbery joined the Major Leagues as part of the California Angels. He pitched at the Oakland Coliseum on July 4, 1975, against Oakland Athletics. During the same season, he pitched in relief against the New York Yankees. The California Angels placed Hockenbery on a waivers list in 1976. Hockenbery said that his career ended because when his manager during the 1975 season wanted him to hit an opponent in the head with a baseball during an upcoming pitch, Hockenbery refused to do so. He sat out during the 1977 season in Onalaska. In 1977, the Seattle Mariners wanted Hockenbery to join the team, but he had to refuse because of an ankle injury. He signed to play with the Oakland Athletics, but he was traded shortly after. Hockenbery played for Jersey City of the Eastern League, and then he retired after briefly playing AAA ball for Vancouver in the Pacific League.

== Later life ==
Hockenbery coached the Onalaska Legion baseball team from 1990 to 2000, minus two years. From 1999 to 2000, he was the head baseball coach at the local high school. He had a stroke in 2005 that caused him to lose feeling on his right side, resulting in him having to be hospitalized for two and a half weeks.
