= Tri-Valley Conference (Wisconsin) =

Wisconsin high school football conference (1953-1958)

The Tri-Valley Conference is a former high school football conference with its membership concentrated in west central Wisconsin. Founded in 1953 and dissolved after the 1958 football season, the conference's member schools belonged to the Wisconsin Interscholastic Athletic Association.

== History ==
The Tri-Valley Conference was formed in 1953 by four small high schools in west central Wisconsin: Blair, Eleva-Strum, Independence and Onalaska. It was named after the three rivers (Mississippi, Black and Trempealeau) that flowed through its catchment area. Three of the conference's original members (Blair, Eleva-Strum and Independence) belonged to the Trempealeau Valley Conference and Onalaska was a member of the Coulee Conference, neither of which sponsored football at that time. Melrose and Sacred Heart in Lima joined the Tri-Valley Conference for the 1955 season, bringing the roster to six schools. Sacred Heart only spent one season in the Tri-Valley Conference and were replaced by former Mississippi Valley Conference members Whitehall for the 1956 season. Just like the school they replaced, their time in the conference was short-lived and they returned to the MVC for the 1957 football season. Bi-County League member Alma joined for the league's final season in 1958, after which the Tri-Valley Conference ceased to exist. Three schools (Blair, Eleva-Strum and Independence) became members of the new Dairyland Conference, and two schools (Melrose and Onalaska) joined the Coulee Conference after it started sponsorship of football in 1959.

== Conference membership history ==
School	Location	Affiliation	Mascot	Colors	Seasons	Primary Conference
Blair	Blair, WI	Public	Cardinals		1953–1958	Trempealeau Valley
Eleva-Strum	Strum, WI	Public	Cardinals		1953–1958	Trempealeau Valley
Independence	Independence, WI	Public	Indees		1953–1958	Trempealeau Valley
Onalaska	Onalaska, WI	Public	Hilltoppers		1953–1958	Coulee
Melrose	Melrose, WI	Public	Eagles		1955–1958	Coulee
Sacred Heart	Lima, WI	Private (Catholic)	Redmen		1955	Independent
Whitehall	Whitehall, WI	Public	Norse		1956	Mississippi Valley
Alma	Alma, WI	Public	Rivermen		1958	Bi-County

== List of conference champions ==
School	Quantity	Years
Onalaska	3	1955, 1957, 1958
Blair	2	1953, 1954
Independence	1	1957
Whitehall	1	1956
Alma	0	
Eleva-Strum	0	
Melrose	0	
Sacred Heart	0	
