= Theresa Knutson =

American ice hockey player

- Born: April 1, 1996 (age 29) Onalaska, Wisconsin, US
- Height: 168 cm (5 ft 6 in)
- Position: Forward
- Shoots: Left
- DFEL team Former teams: ECDC Memmingen: Metropolitan Riveters; Eisbären Juniors Berlin; Mad Dogs Mannheim; UConn Huskies
- Playing career: 2014–present

Theresa Marie Knutson (born April 1, 1996) is an American ice hockey forward, currently playing in the German Women's Ice Hockey League (DFEL) with ECDC Memmingen.

== Playing career ==
Knutson attended Aquinas High School in La Crosse, Wisconsin and played varsity ice hockey with the Onalaska Hilltoppers Co-Op based at Onalaska High School in Onalaska, Wisconsin. During her high school ice hockey career in Wisconsin Prep Hockey (WiPH), she led the state in scoring for four consecutive seasons, was named Wisconsin High School Offensive Player of the Year three times, and won the Wisconsin Miss Hockey Award in 2014.

From 2014 to 2018, she played college ice hockey with the UConn Huskies women's ice hockey program, scoring 79 points in 135 NCAA games. She scored her first collegiate goal on 19 October 2014 against the Syracuse Orange.

After graduating, she moved to Germany to sign with Mad Dogs Mannheim in the Fraueneishockey-Bundesliga. In her rookie Bundesliga season, she ranked third in the league for scoring, with 66 points in 28 games, including 48 goals.

She returned to North America for the 2020–21 season, signing with the Metropolitan Riveters of the National Women's Hockey League (NWHL; renamed PHF in 2021). Due to the COVID-19 pandemic, the number of games in the NWHL season was severely limited, prompting Knutson to return to Germany and play with the Eisbären Juniors Berlin in the DFEL after the Riveters season had ended. She re-signed with the Riveters for the 2021–22 PHF season.

Knutson signed with ECDC Memmingen for the 2022–23 DFEL season, during which she led the league in regular season scoring, with 14 goals and 18 assists for 32 points in twenty games. Her elite production helped propel the team to a bronze medal finish in the 2023 EWHL Super Cup and her playoff-leading 14 points contributed to ECDC Memmingen’s consecutive semifinal and final series sweeps, which ended in the 2023 German Championship victory.

== Career statistics ==
=== Regular season and playoffs ===
			Regular season					Playoffs
Season	Team	League	GP	G	A	Pts	PIM	GP	G	A	Pts	PIM
2010-11	Onalaska Co-Op	WiPH		54				2	5	3	8	0
2011-12	Onalaska Co-Op	WiPH	24	61	32	93	8	5	10	2	12	6
2012-13	Onalaska Co-Op	WiPH	23	70	14	94	32	5	7	7	14	8
2013-14	Onalaska Co-Op	WiPH	22	69	18	87	26	5	9	11	20	2
2014-15	UConn Huskies	NCAA	36	9	5	14	10	–	–	–	–	–
2015-16	UConn Huskies	NCAA	37	19	9	28	22	–	–	–	–	–
2016-17	UConn Huskies	NCAA	23	10	9	19	12	–	–	–	–	–
2017-18	UConn Huskies	NCAA	39	13	5	18	16	–	–	–	–	–
2018-19	Mad Dogs Mannheim	DFEL	28	48	18	66	22	2	8	0	8	2
2019-20	Mad Dogs Mannheim	DFEL	21	15	13	28	30	4	7	4	11	2
2020-21	Metropolitan Riveters	NWHL	3	1	0	1	0	–	–	–	–	–
2020-21	Eisbären Juniors Berlin	DFEL	8	5	7	12	0	2	2	0	2	0
2021-22	Metropolitan Riveters	PHF	19	6	6	12	6	1	0	0	0	0
2022-23	ECDC Memmingen	DFEL	20	14	18	32	8	6	9	5	14	0
NCAA totals			135	51	28	79	60	–	–	–	–	–
PHF totals			22	7	6	13	6	1	0	0	0	0
DFEL totals			77	82	56	138	60	8	11	5	16	0

Note: Postseason results from the 2018–19 and 2019–20 seasons are from the relegation round rather than the playoffs and are not calculated with playoff totals.
