= Tom Newberry =

American football player (born 1962)

No. 66
- Position: Guard

Personal information
- Born: December 20, 1962 (age 63); Onalaska, Wisconsin, U.S.
- Listed height: 6 ft 2 in (1.88 m)
- Listed weight: 285 lb (129 kg)

Career information
- High school: Onalaska
- College: Wisconsin–La Crosse
- NFL draft: 1986: 2nd round, 50th overall pick

Career history
- Los Angeles Rams (1986–1994); Pittsburgh Steelers (1995)

Awards and highlights
- 2× First-team All-Pro (1988, 1989); 2× Pro Bowl (1988, 1989); PFWA All-Rookie Team (1986)

Career NFL statistics
- Games played: 147
- Games started: 143
- Fumble recoveries: 5
- Stats at Pro Football Reference

Thomas J. Newberry (born December 20, 1962) is an American former professional football player who was a guard for 10 seasons in the National Football League (NFL). He played with the Los Angeles Rams for nine years and the Pittsburgh Steelers for one year. He was a starter for the Steelers in Super Bowl XXX. He was a two-time Pro Bowl (1988,1989) and All-Pro offensive guard.

Newberry was named to the Wisconsin Sports Hall of Fame in 2015.

== College career ==
After graduating from Onalaska High School, Newberry attended the University of Wisconsin–La Crosse on an academic scholarship. Newberry was a four year starter and letter winner on the offensive line for the Wisconsin–La Crosse Eagles football team under head coach Roger Harring. He was also a captain of the 1985 NAIA Division II Football National Championship winning team. While at UW–L he was a four time NCAA Division III National Champion in track and field, three times in shot put and one time in discus. He was inducted into the UW–L Wall of Fame in 1997.

== Professional career ==
=== Los Angeles Rams ===
Newberry was drafted 50th overall in the second round of the 1986 NFL draft by the Los Angeles Rams. In his rookie season, Newberry started in 14 regular season games, and played in all 16 games, as well as starting in the Rams playoff game. Newberry was selected to the 1986 PFWA All-Rookie Team. Over his nine seasons with the Rams, Newberry played in 136 games, starting in 133 games including playoffs. With the Rams Newberry was selected to the 1988 All-Pro Team and 1989 All-Pro Team. Additionally, Newberry was a member of the 1989 Pro Bowl and 1990 Pro Bowl. Newberry made the playoffs three times with the Rams (1986, 1988, 1989).

=== Pittsburgh Steelers ===
In 1995 Newberry played his final season with the Pittsburgh Steelers starting in 15 regular season games, and playing in all 16 regular season games compiling a 11–5–0 record and winning the AFC Central Division. Newberry started in all three playoff games, beating the Indianapolis Colts in the 1995 AFC Championship Game by a score of 20–16, before losing to the Dallas Cowboys in Super Bowl XXX 17–27. Shortly after the Super Bowl, Newberry informed head coach Bill Cowher that he planned to retire.
