= Frank Eugene Nichols House =

Historic house in Wisconsin, United States

- U.S. National Register of Historic Places
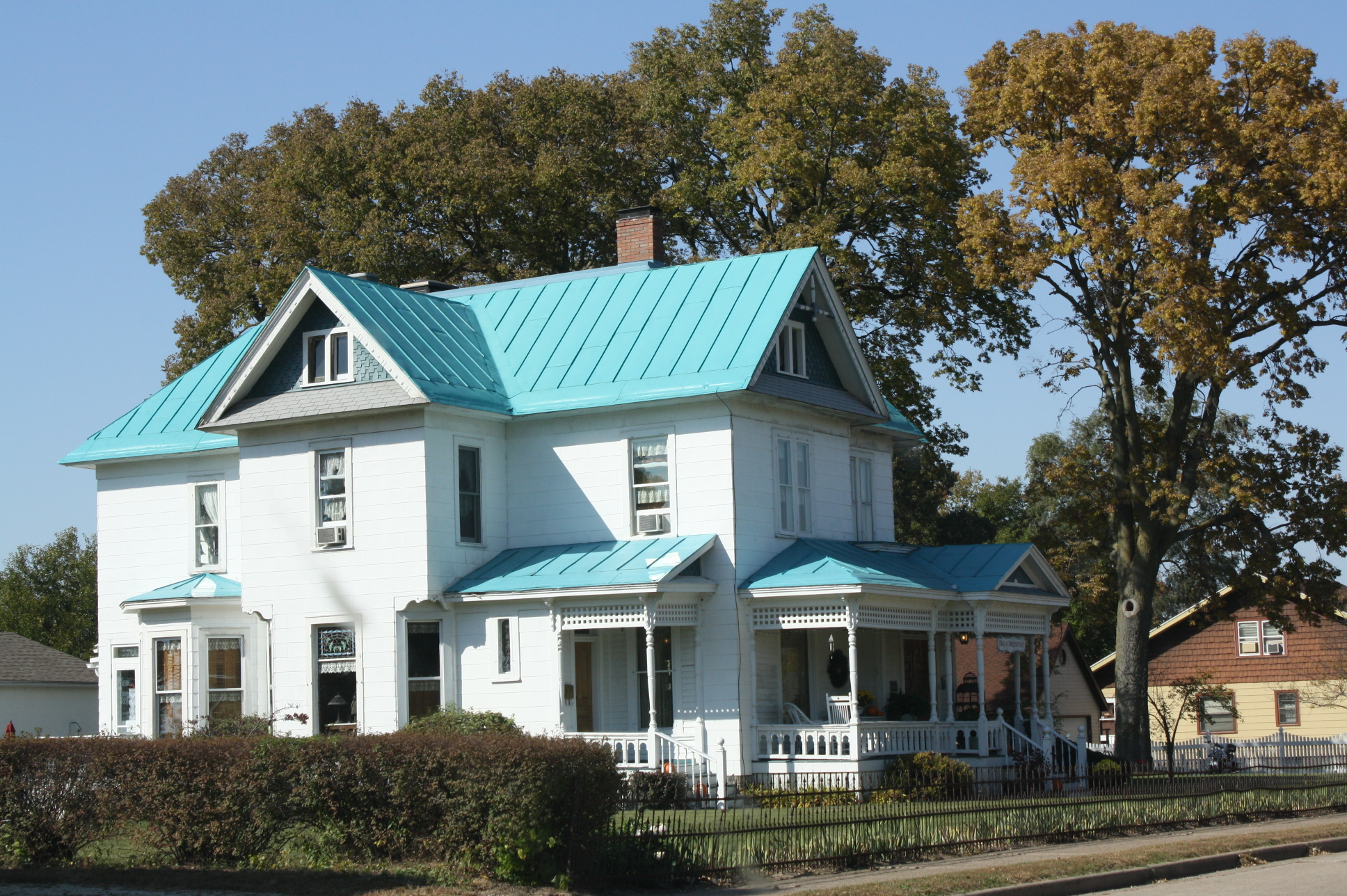
- Frank Eugene Nichols House
- Location: 421 N. Second St., Onalaska, Wisconsin
- Coordinates: 43°53′10″N 91°14′10″W
- Area: less than one acre
- Architect: Frank DeLorea
- Architectural style: Queen Anne
- NRHP reference No.: 93000027
- Added to NRHP: February 11, 1993

The Frank Eugene Nichols House is located in Onalaska, Wisconsin. It was added to the State Register of Historic Places in 1992 and to the National Register of Historic Places the following year.
