= Misty Lown =

American dance teacher, studio owner, and author

- Occupations: Studio owner and dancer
- Website: www.mistylown.com

Misty Lown is an American dance teacher, studio owner and author of One Small Yes. She is the founder of Misty's Dance Unlimited and the More Than Just Great Dancing dance studio affiliate program.

== Biography ==
Lown was reared in La Crosse, Wisconsin. Her parents are father Paul Averill, a truck driver who retrained to work in the railroad industry, and mother Sandy Averill. She began taking dance lessons at age three despite having asthma and a club foot, and taught dance starting at age 16. Attending college at University of Wisconsin–La Crosse, she earned a bachelor's degree in Spanish and a master's degree in education. She was accepted into a year-long training program at the Alvin Ailey American Dance Theater but realized she wanted to be a dance teacher rather than a performer.

In 1998 at age 21, she founded Misty's Dance Unlimited in Onalaska, Wisconsin, teaching ballet, tap, jazz, hip hop, and beginner's classes. The studio integrates classes on community building and service into the dance curriculum. Lown is also the owner of More Than Just Great Dancing, an international affiliation program that establishes standards for dance programs and management. The program included 25 dance studios as of 2013 and 177 dance schools as of November 2016. In 2013, Lown and Misty's Dance Unlimited won Evoloshen's "Most Amazing Companies" award. She also founded the A Chance To Dance Foundation, which as of 2015 had awarded over $200,000 in financial assistance and scholarships to students in need.

In the summer of 2016, she published a digital edition of her book One Small Yes: Small Decisions That Lead to Big Results which resulted in 10,000 downloads on Amazon in its first five days of release. A year later it had 55,000 downloads and became available in print.

Lown sees teachers as important supports for dancers struggling with rising anxiety and depression. To ease students’ stress, she redesigned her studio's schedule based on parent feedback, consolidating older dancers’ rehearsals into a single three-hour, phone-free Monday block and shifting their classes later in the day to allow time for other extracurricular activities. She also regularly invites wellness specialists to speak about whole-life balance and holds annual “dance pathways” conferences in the spring to help families create manageable schedules.

She has been recognized as "Teacher of the Year" by Eclipse, "Outstanding Businesswoman of the Year" by the YWCA and awarded the "Pope John XXIII Award for Distinguished Service" by Viterbo University and the "Philanthropy Award" from the Red Cross.

Lown married her high school boyfriend and has five children.
