= Onalaska School District (Onalaska, Wisconsin) =

Public school in Wisconsin

Coordinates: 43°52′52″N 91°13′59″W

Address
- 237 2nd Avenue South Onalaska, La Crosse County, Wisconsin, 54650; United States

District information
- Motto: Working together to ensure high levels of learning for all
- Grades: PK–12
- Superintendent: Dr. Todd Antoni
- Schools: 6
- NCES District ID: 5511010

Students and staff
- Students: 2,920 (2024–25)
- Teachers: 211.02 (on an FTE basis)
- Student–teacher ratio: 13.84
- Colors: Purple, white, and black

Other information
- Website: www.onalaskaschools.com

School District of Onalaska is the public school district for Onalaska, Wisconsin in La Crosse County, Wisconsin. Onalaska High School is the school district's public high school.

== Schools ==
- Onalaska High School
- Onalaska Middle School
- Eagle Bluff Elementary School
- Irving Pertzsch Elementary School
- Northern Hills Elementary
- Prekindergarten Partner School

== Gallery ==
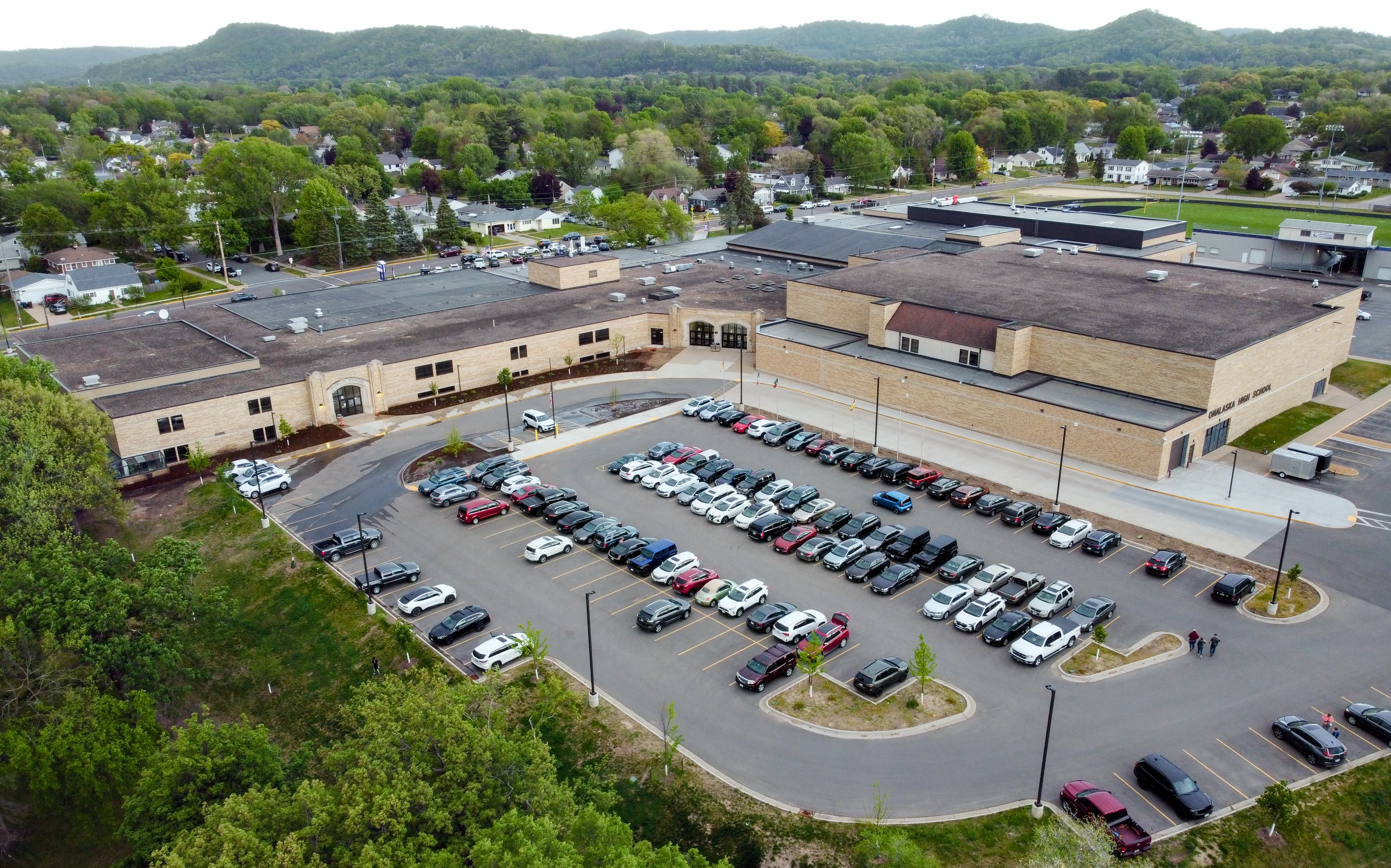
Onalaska High School

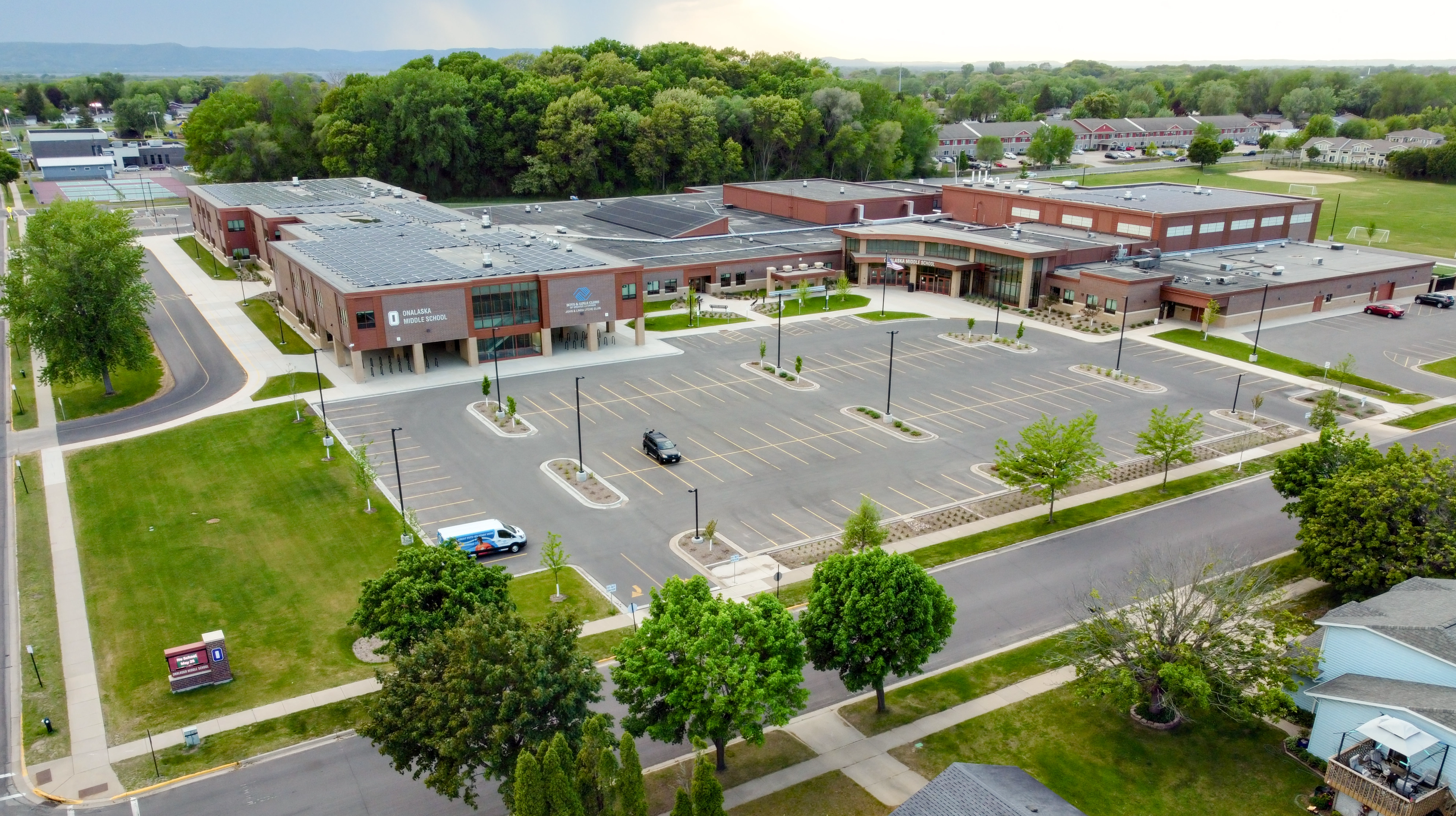
Onalaska Middle School

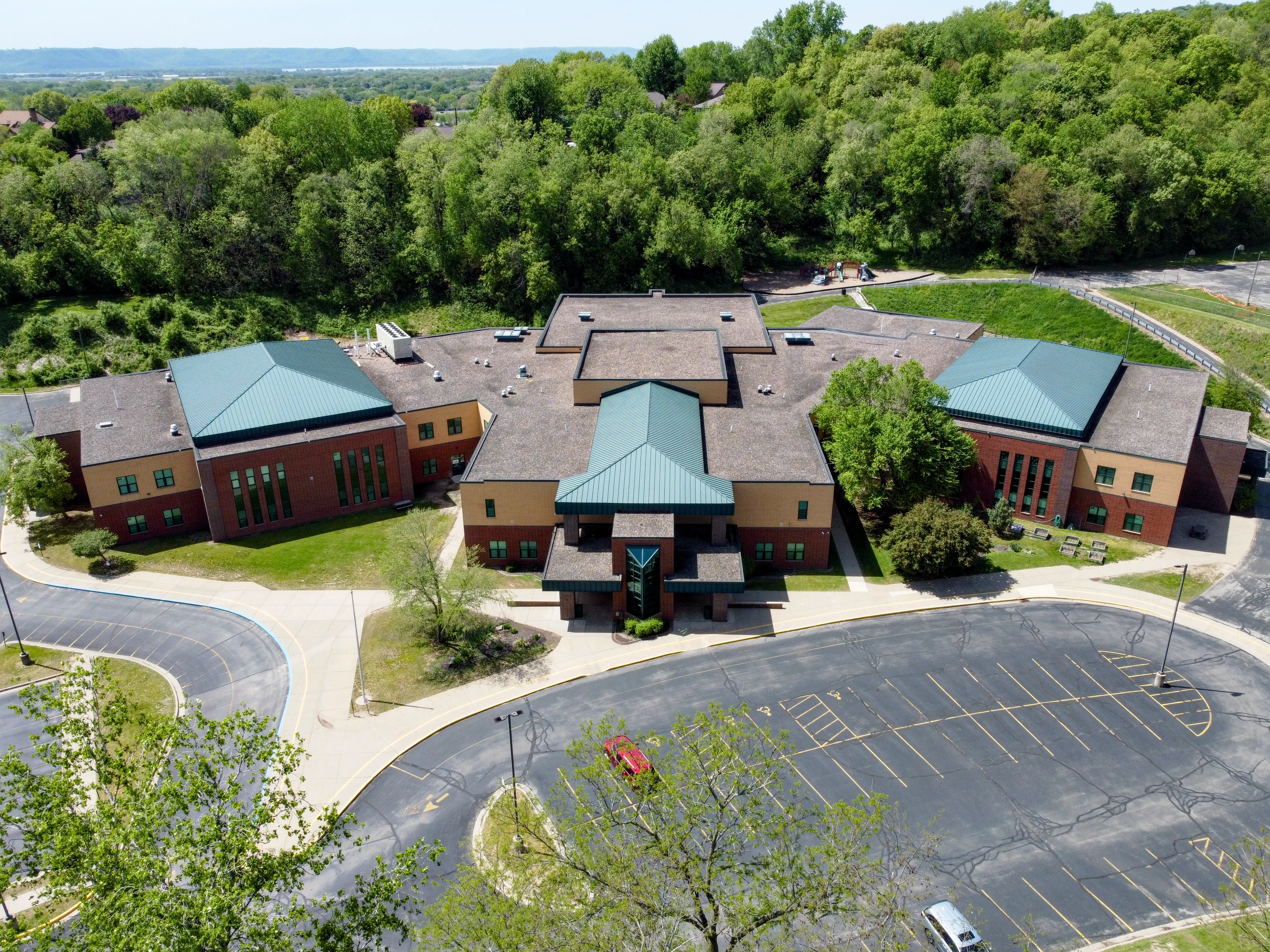
Eagle Bluff Elementary

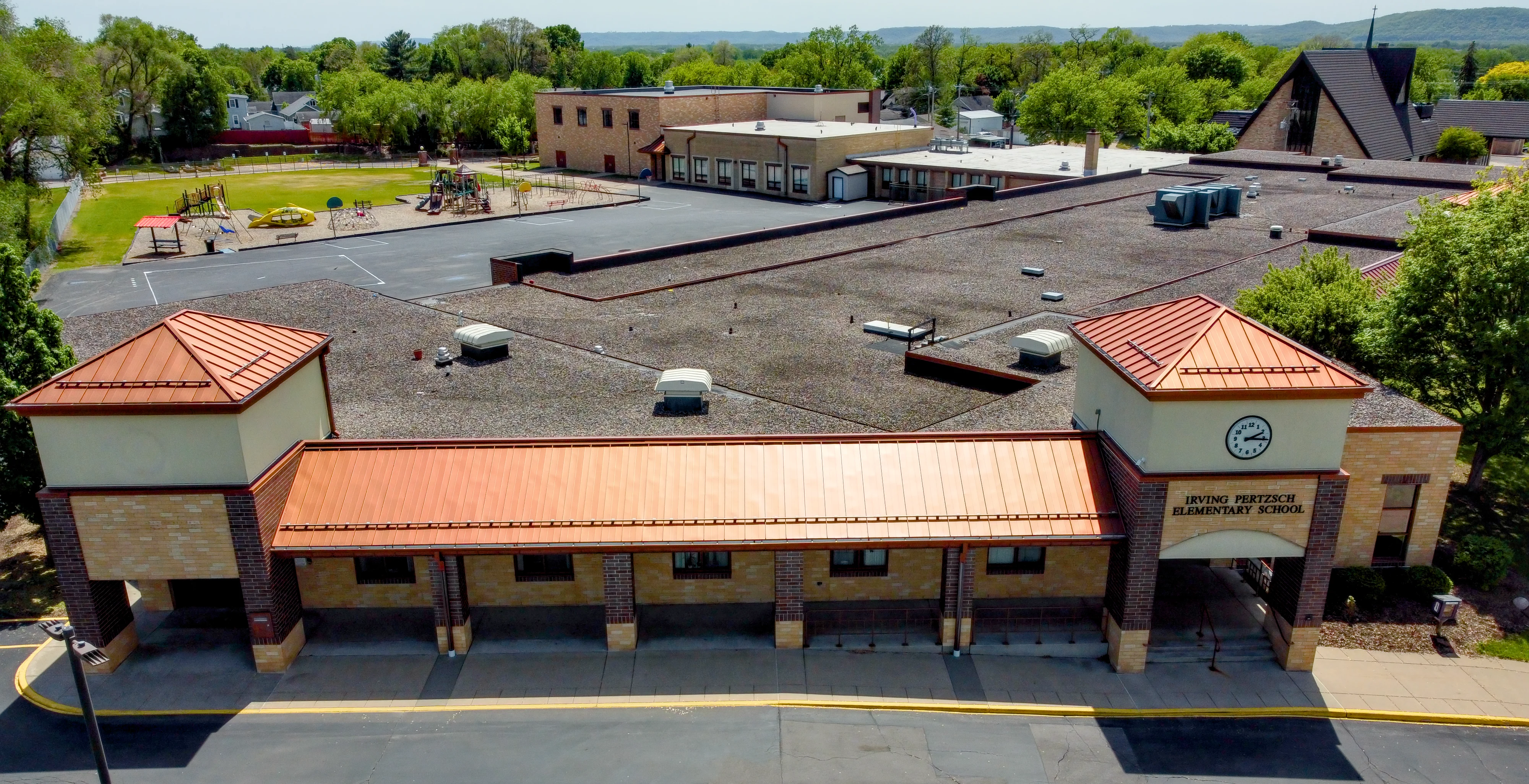
Irving Pertzsch Elementary

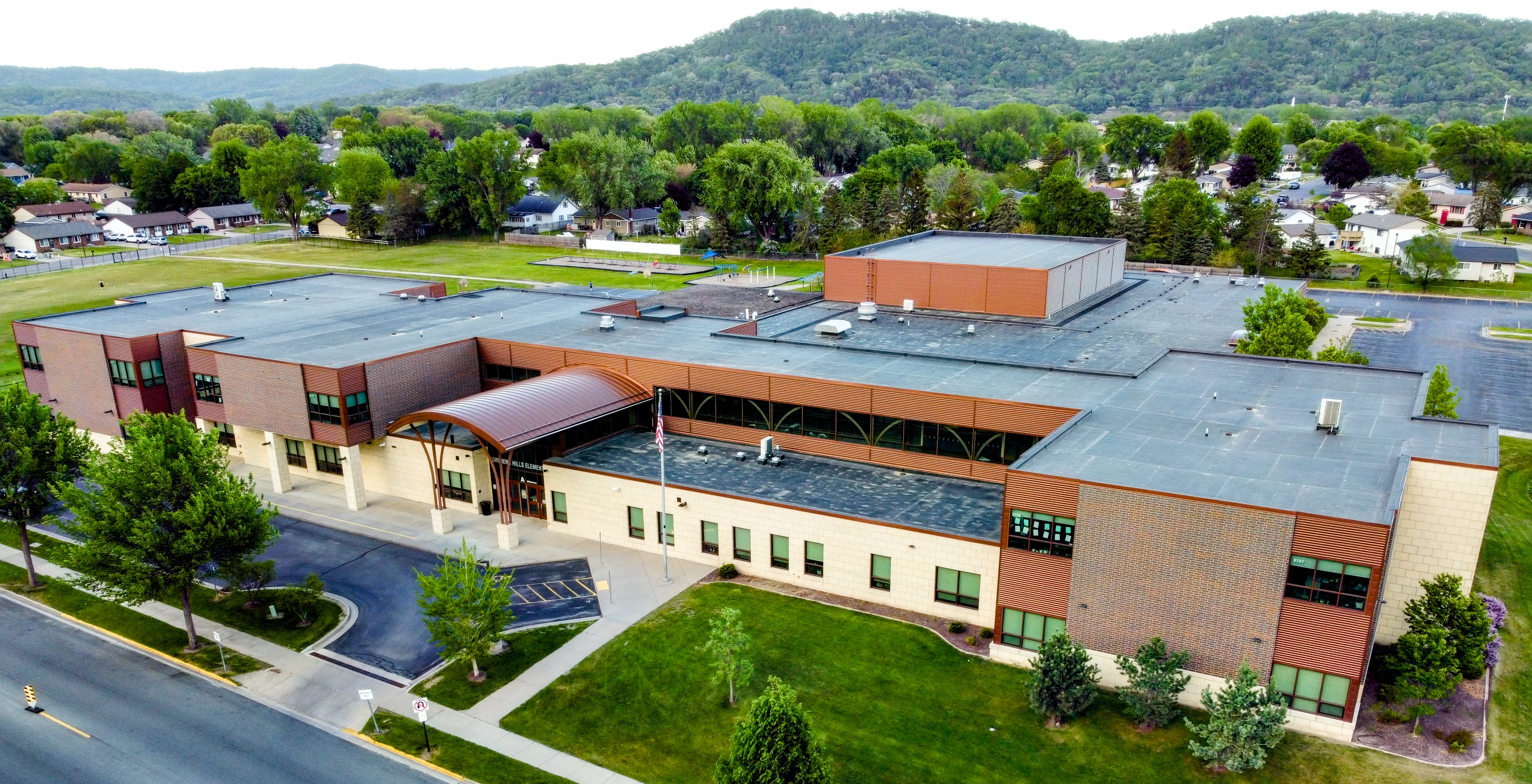
Northern Hills Elementary
