= Onalaska High School (Wisconsin) =

Public secondary school in Onakaska, Wisconsin, United States

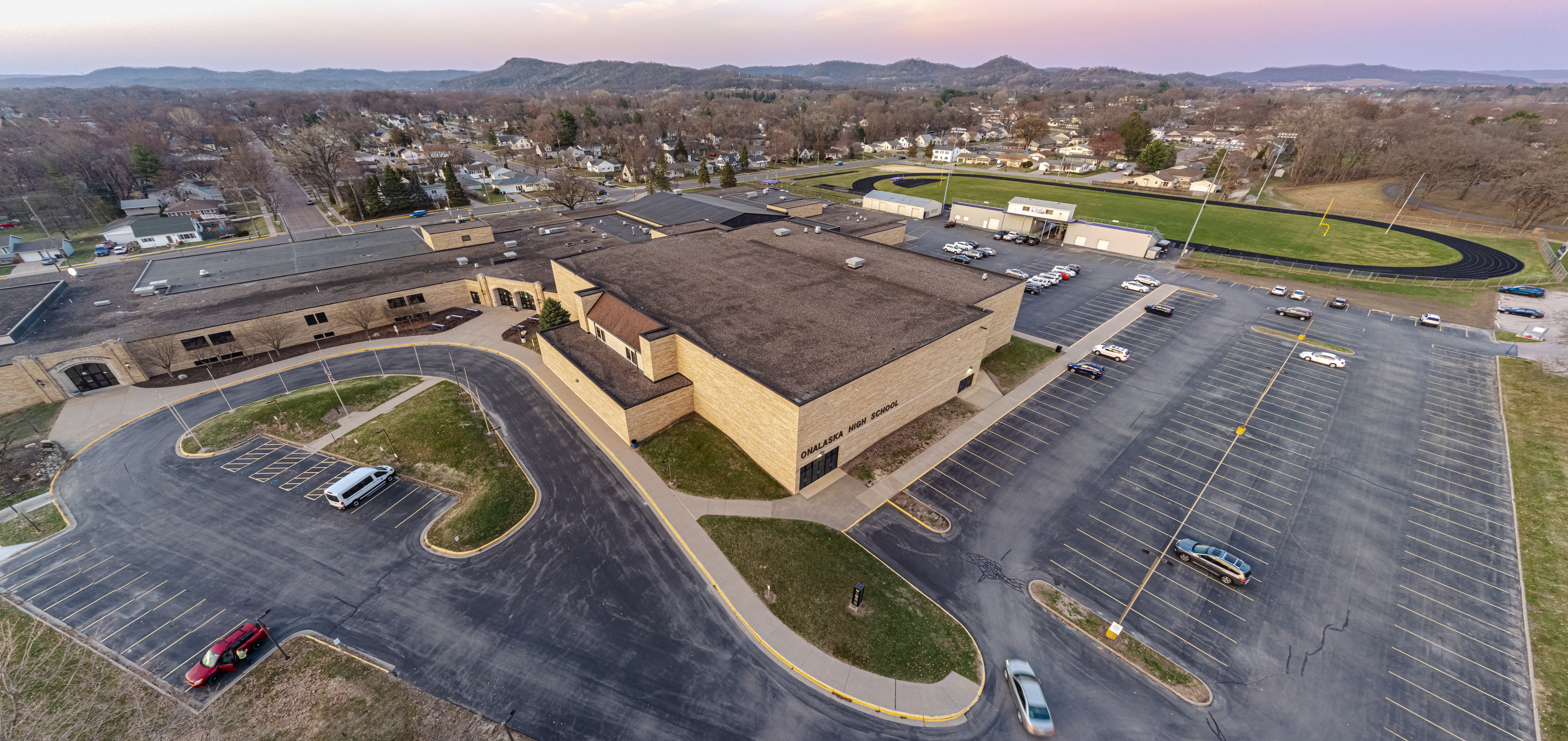

Location
- 700 Hilltopper Place; Onalaska, La Crosse County, Wisconsin 54650; United States; 43.8764°N 91.22726°W

Information
- School type: Public, Secondary
- Motto: Where you can't hide that Hilltopper pride!
- Established: 1890
- School district: Onalaska School District
- Superintendent: Ben Barton
- Principal: Jared Schaffner
- Grades: 9-12
- Enrollment: 926 (2023-2024)
- Student to teacher ratio: 14: 1
- Hours in school day: 8
- Colors: Purple, white, and black
- Athletics conference: Mississippi Valley Conference
- Mascot: Freddy Hilltopper
- Rival: Holmen, La Crosse Central
- Publication: Freddy's Footnotes
- Communities served: Onalaska, Wisconsin
- Website: https://onalaskahighschool.onalaskaschools.com/

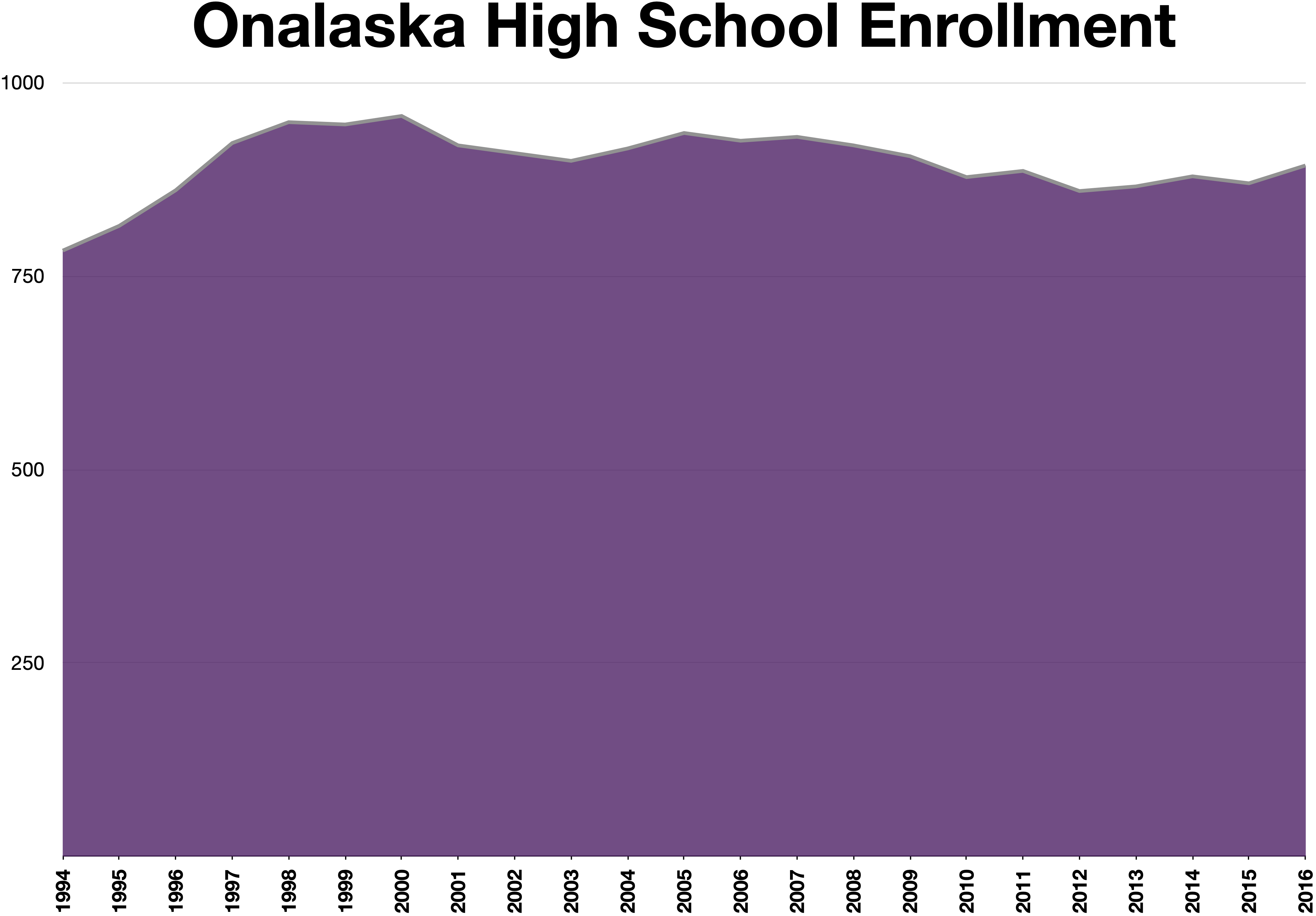
Onalaska High School enrollment

Onalaska High School is a public high school in Onalaska, Wisconsin, in the Onalaska School District. It had an enrollment of 933 students in grades 9-12 for the 2022-23 school year.

== History ==
The first public high school in Onalaska was founded in January 1890 on a plot of land between Main, King, Fourth and Fifth Streets. The first graduating class had three students, and the school was known as the Vikings, with the school colors being red and white. The original building burned down in 1895, and a new building was built on-site the following year. After another fire in 1924 left the new building completely destroyed, all students in the Onalaska public school system moved to the former La Crosse County School of Agriculture. The school's colors changed to purple and white in the 1940s, and the "Hilltopper" moniker came soon after that due to the location of the school, dubbed "Heaven on a Hill". Another new building was built due to growing student counts in 1970.

== Academics ==
Onalaska offers Advanced Placement classes. About half of all seniors take AP classes.

== Demographics ==
OHS is 71.7% white, 12.6% Asian, 6.1% Hispanic, 6.1% two or more races, 2.4% black, and 0.4% American Indian, and 0.1% Native Hawaiian/Pacific Islander. OHS is 48% female and 52% male.

== Athletics ==
=== WIAA ===
Onalaska competes in the Mississippi Valley Conference (MVC) and the Wisconsin Interscholastic Athletic Association (WIAA), winning 10 state titles across 5 different sports.

WIAA state champion titles:

- Boys' Basketball: 1988, 1992, 2012
- Boys' Cross Country: 2021
- Boys' Golf: 1982, 1985
- Girls' Golf: 1989
- Girls' Gymnastics: 1985, 1997, 1998

=== WAHA ===
Prior to joining the WIAA for hockey, the Hilltopper hockey team competed in the Wisconsin Amateur Hockey Association (WAHA). The Hilltoppers won the 1986 and 1987 WAHA Class B state titles.

=== Athletic conference affiliation history ===
- Coulee Conference (1926–1989)
- Tri-Valley Conference (1953–1958; football only)
- Mississippi Valley Conference (1989–present)

== Performing arts ==
=== Show Choir ===
OHS has two competitive show choirs, the higher-level Hilltoppers and lower-level Express. The Hilltoppers have been a top show choir in the nation for three decades, winning a competition in Wisconsin Dells, Wisconsin in 1984. From 1985 - 2006, led by Paul Gulsvig, the Hilltoppers competed in 140 competitions, won grand championships in 16 cities and 7 states, won national championships in 2004 and 2006, and made the finals in all but two of the competitions in the 21-year period.

They continue to be a major force, ranking 2nd in the nation, winning six grand championships, best band, and best vocals awards in their 2020 season with their show themed after the Netflix TV series The Umbrella Academy. OHS also hosts its own annual competition, the Onalaska Show Choir Classic, which started in 1987. It is noted for being one of the toughest competitions in the Midwest and attracts schools from Wisconsin, Minnesota and Iowa.

=== Dance Team ===
The OHS dance team competes in the Wisconsin Association of Cheer/Pom Coaches (WACPC) and has won five state championships:

- 1992 (Division 1 Pom)
- 1993 (Division 1 Jazz)
- 1996 (Division 2 Pom)
- 2019 (Division 2 Jazz)
- 2026 (Division 2 Jazz)

== Notable alumni ==
- Tim Gullikson, professional tennis player and coach
- Tom Gullikson, professional tennis player and coach
- Chuck Hockenbery, Major League Baseball player for the California Angels
- Michael Huebsch, Wisconsin politician
- Sandra Lee, professional chef and television personality
- Tom Newberry, National Football League player for the Los Angeles Rams and Pittsburgh Steelers
- Frank Pooler, composer
- Mark Proksch, comedian and actor
- Matt Thomas, National Basketball Association player for the Toronto Raptors, Utah Jazz, and Chicago Bulls
- Rhonda K. Wood, Associate Justice of the Arkansas Supreme Court

== Gallery ==
Onalaska High School open field	Onalaska High School 360° panoramic (view as a 360° interactive panorama) Onalaska High School Entrance	Skate park at Rowe Park
