= Onalaska, Wisconsin =

City in the United States

- City
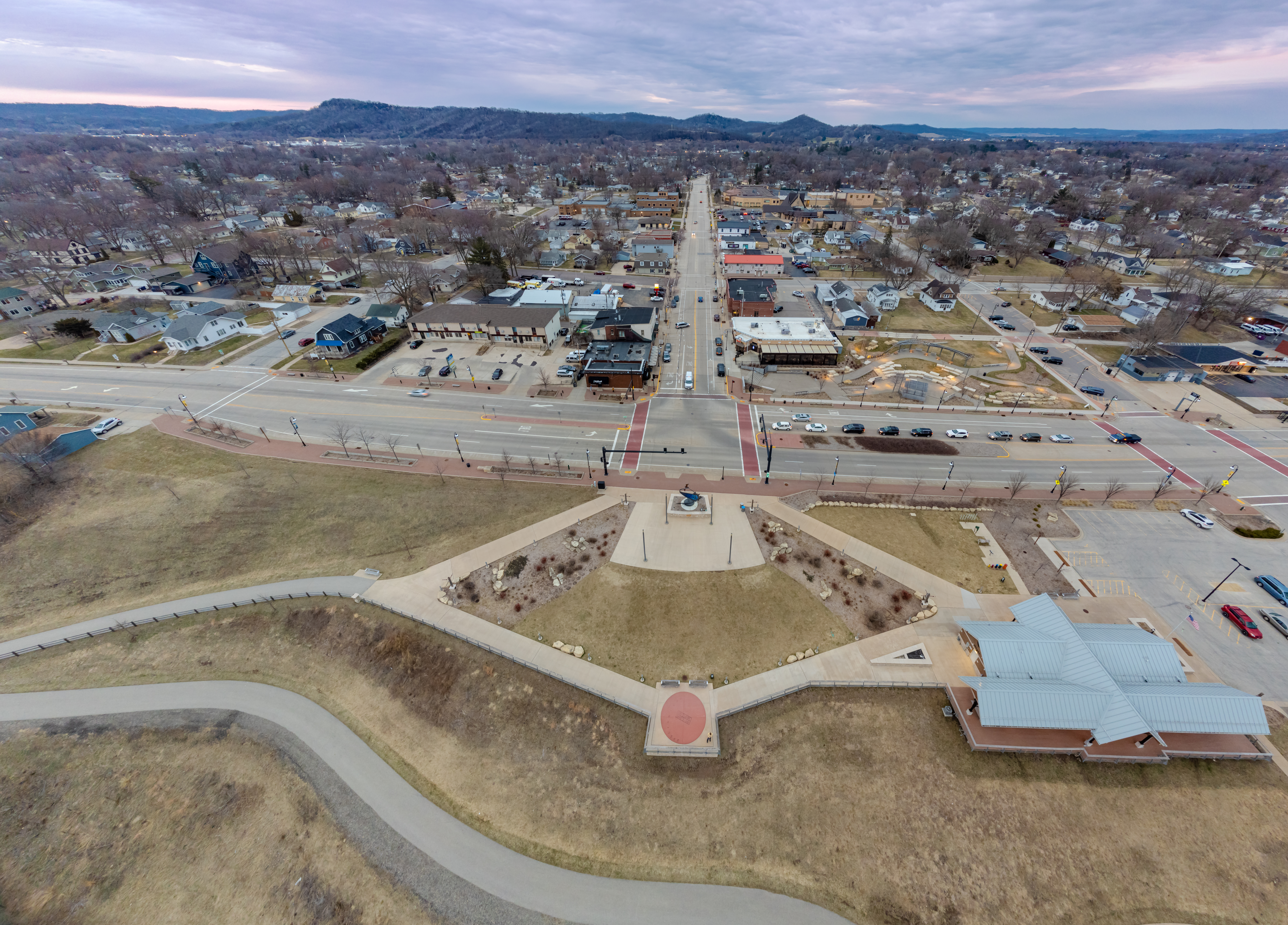
- Downtown Onalaska
- Nickname: Ona
- Location of Onalaska in La Crosse County, Wisconsin.

- Location within Wisconsin Location within the United States
- Country: United States
- State: Wisconsin
- County: La Crosse
- Established: 1851
- Founder: Thomas G. Rowe

Government
  - Mayor: Kim Smith

Area
  - Total: 10.98 sq mi (28.43 km^{2})
  - Land: 10.38 sq mi (26.88 km^{2})
  - Water: 0.60 sq mi (1.55 km^{2})
- Elevation: 700 ft (210 m)

Population (2020)
  - Total: 18,803
  - Estimate (2022): 18,975 ▲
  - Density: 1,825.3/sq mi (704.77/km^{2})
- Time zone: UTC−6 (Central)
  - Summer (DST): UTC−5 (Central)
- Zipcode: 54650
- Area code: 608
- FIPS code: 55-59925
- Public Transit: La Crosse MTU
- Website: www.onalaskawi.gov

Onalaska (/ˌɒnəˈlæskə/ ON-ə-LASS-kə) is a city in La Crosse County, Wisconsin, United States. The population was 18,803 at the 2020 census. It is a principal city of the La Crosse–Onalaska metropolitan area.

Onalaska is built on a slightly elevated ridge above the Black River. Natural areas include both river bottom land and high, heavily wooded, scenic bluffs. A man-made reservoir at the city's western edge is known as Lake Onalaska. Onalaska is known as "The Sunfish Capital of the World."

== History ==
The original village (now city) was platted by Thomas G. Rowe (New York) and John C. Laird (Pennsylvania) in 1851. In its early days, lumbering and related industries served as a basis for its economy.

According to local legend, the city's name comes from the 1799 poem The Pleasures of Hope, by the Scottish poet Thomas Campbell, which makes one mention of "Oonalaska's shore" in a passage about the remote reaches of a sailor's explorations. "Oonalaska" was an alternative spelling for Unalaska Island in Russian Alaska, one of the principal Aleutian Islands. Early settler Harvey Hubbard recounted that the poem was one of Thomas Rowe's favorites, leading him to choose the name. However, local historian George Tabbert argued that the name was more likely inspired by the story of a Lenape woman named Onalaska who died around 1780 in what is now Richland County, Ohio. By the 1840s, the woman's name was used in a variety of places, including a New York ferryboat that Rowe would likely have been familiar with. Other places named Onalaska are in Arkansas (now defunct), Texas, and Washington.

== Geography ==
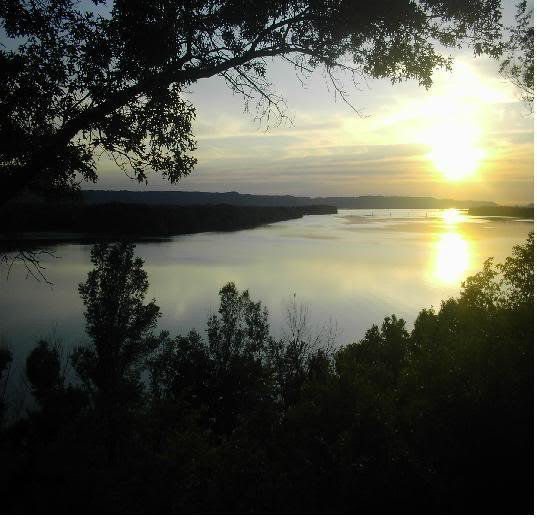
Lake Onalaska

According to the United States Census Bureau, the city has a total area of 10.97 square miles (28.41 km^{2}), of which 10.38 square miles (26.88 km^{2}) is land and 0.60 square miles (1.55 km^{2}) is water.

Onalaska lies immediately north of La Crosse, on the Black River. It is the second-largest city in La Crosse County, Wisconsin.

Named streams within the current corporate limits of the city include the Black River, the La Crosse River and Sand Lake Coulee Creek. In the 1930s, the construction of Lake Onalaska resulted in the flooding and eventual disappearance of a shallow, natural body of water, Rice Lake, and several smaller ponds in the Black River bottoms area.

Brice Prairie is an urban reserve area within the City of Onalaska, located below the ridge on which most of the city is situated. It lies to the northwest of the city's current northern border and is directly on Lake Onalaska.

== Demographics ==
Historical population
| Census | Pop. | Note | %± |
|---|---|---|---|
| 1880 | 826 | | — |
| 1890 | 1,587 | | 92.1% |
| 1900 | 1,368 | | −13.8% |
| 1910 | 1,146 | | −16.2% |
| 1920 | 1,066 | | −7.0% |
| 1930 | 1,408 | | 32.1% |
| 1940 | 1,742 | | 23.7% |
| 1950 | 2,561 | | 47.0% |
| 1960 | 3,161 | | 23.4% |
| 1970 | 4,909 | | 55.3% |
| 1980 | 9,249 | | 88.4% |
| 1990 | 11,284 | | 22.0% |
| 2000 | 14,839 | | 31.5% |
| 2010 | 17,736 | | 19.5% |
| 2020 | 18,803 | | 6.0% |
| 2022 (est.) | 18,975 | | 0.9% |
U.S. Decennial Census 2020 census

=== 2020 census ===
As of the 2020 census, Onalaska had a population of 18,803. The median age was 40.7 years. 22.5% of residents were under the age of 18 and 21.1% of residents were 65 years of age or older. For every 100 females, there were 92.7 males, and for every 100 females age 18 and over, there were 90.0 males age 18 and over.

The population density was 1,811.8 inhabitants per square mile (699.5/km^{2}). The city had 8,241 housing units at an average density of 794.1 per square mile (306.6/km^{2}). Of housing units, 4.1% were vacant. The homeowner vacancy rate was 0.5% and the rental vacancy rate was 4.9%.

99.9% of residents lived in urban areas, while 0.1% lived in rural areas.

There were 7,900 households in Onalaska, of which 28.4% had children under the age of 18 living in them. Of all households, 49.0% were married-couple households, 15.9% were households with a male householder and no spouse or partner present, and 26.9% were households with a female householder and no spouse or partner present. About 29.6% of all households were made up of individuals and 14.4% had someone living alone who was 65 years of age or older.

Racial composition as of the 2020 census
| Race | Number | Percent |
|---|---|---|
| White | 15,904 | 84.6% |
| Black or African American | 212 | 1.1% |
| American Indian and Alaska Native | 77 | 0.4% |
| Asian | 1,513 | 8.0% |
| Native Hawaiian and Other Pacific Islander | 2 | 0.0% |
| Some other race | 168 | 0.9% |
| Two or more races | 927 | 4.9% |
| Hispanic or Latino (of any race) | 485 | 2.6% |

=== 2013 income statistics ===
According to 2009–2013 ACS estimates, the median household income was $55,982 and the median family income was $74,182. Males had a median income of $47,745 versus $35,292 for females. The per capita income for the city was $31,491. About 3.4% of families and 6.8% of the population were below the poverty line, including 8.1% of those under age 18 and 11.1% of those age 65 or over.

=== 2010 census ===
As of the census of 2010, there were 17,736 people, 7,331 households, and 4,792 families living in the city. The population density was 1,750.8 inhabitants per square mile (676.0/km^{2}). There were 7,608 housing units at an average density of 751.0 per square mile (290.0/km^{2}). The racial makeup of the city was 90.7% White, 1.1% African American, 0.3% Native American, 5.7% Asian, 0.5% from other races, and 1.7% from two or more races. Hispanic or Latino of any race were 1.6% of the population.

There were 7,331 households, of which 31.9% had children under the age of 18 living with them, 52.5% were married couples living together, 9.1% had a female householder with no husband present, 3.8% had a male householder with no wife present, and 34.6% were non-families. 28.0% of all households were made up of individuals, and 11.8% had someone living alone who was 65 years of age or older. The average household size was 2.40 and the average family size was 2.96.

The median age in the city was 38.5 years. 24.9% of residents were under the age of 18; 7.3% were between the ages of 18 and 24; 25.9% were from 25 to 44; 26.5% were from 45 to 64; and 15.3% were 65 years of age or older. The gender makeup of the city was 48.0% male and 52.0% female.

=== 2000 census ===
As of the census of 2000, there were 14,839 people, 5,893 households, and 4,036 families living in the city. The population density was 1,631.6 people per square mile (630.3/km^{2}). There were 6,070 housing units at an average density of 667.4 per square mile (257.8/km^{2}). The racial makeup of the city was 95.17% White, 0.63% Black or African American, 0.20% Native American, 2.80% Asian, 0.25% from other races, and 0.95% from two or more races. 0.95% of the population were Hispanic or Latino of any race.

There were 5,893 households, out of which 33.8% had children under the age of 18 living with them, 57.0% were married couples living together, 8.6% had a female householder with no husband present, and 31.5% were non-families. 24.4% of all households were made up of individuals, and 7.4% had someone living alone who was 65 years of age or older. The average household size was 2.50 and the average family size was 3.00.

In the city, the population was spread out, with 26.2% under the age of 18, 8.8% from 18 to 24, 29.9% from 25 to 44, 23.9% from 45 to 64, and 11.3% who were 65 years of age or older. The median age was 36 years. For every 100 females, there were 93.8 males. For every 100 females age 18 and over, there were 90.0 males.

The median income for a household in the city was $47,800, and the median income for a family was $57,264. Males had a median income of $41,335 versus $25,316 for females. The per capita income for the city was $24,066. About 4.5% of families and 6.2% of the population were below the poverty line, including 7.7% of those under age 18 and 5.4% of those age 65 or over.

== Education ==
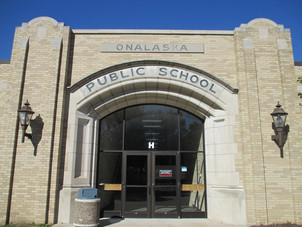
thumbOnalaska High School entrance

Onalaska is served by two school districts, Onalaska and Holmen. Onalaska School District schools include Onalaska High School, Onalaska Middle School, Eagle Bluff Elementary School, Northern Hills Elementary School and Irving Pertzsch Elementary School.

Parochial schools in the city include Luther High School, a Lutheran high school of the Wisconsin Evangelical Lutheran Synod, St. Patrick Elementary School, part of La Crosse Aquinas Catholic Schools, and St. Pauls Lutheran School, serving grades Pre-K through 8.

== Media ==
- Onalaska's newspaper is the Onalaska/Holmen Courier-Life.
- Onalaska's tourism Instagram is @discoveronalaska

== Economy ==
Onalaska Omni Center is Onalaska's convention center and indoor arena. It is the second largest convention center in southwest Wisconsin, after the La Crosse Center.

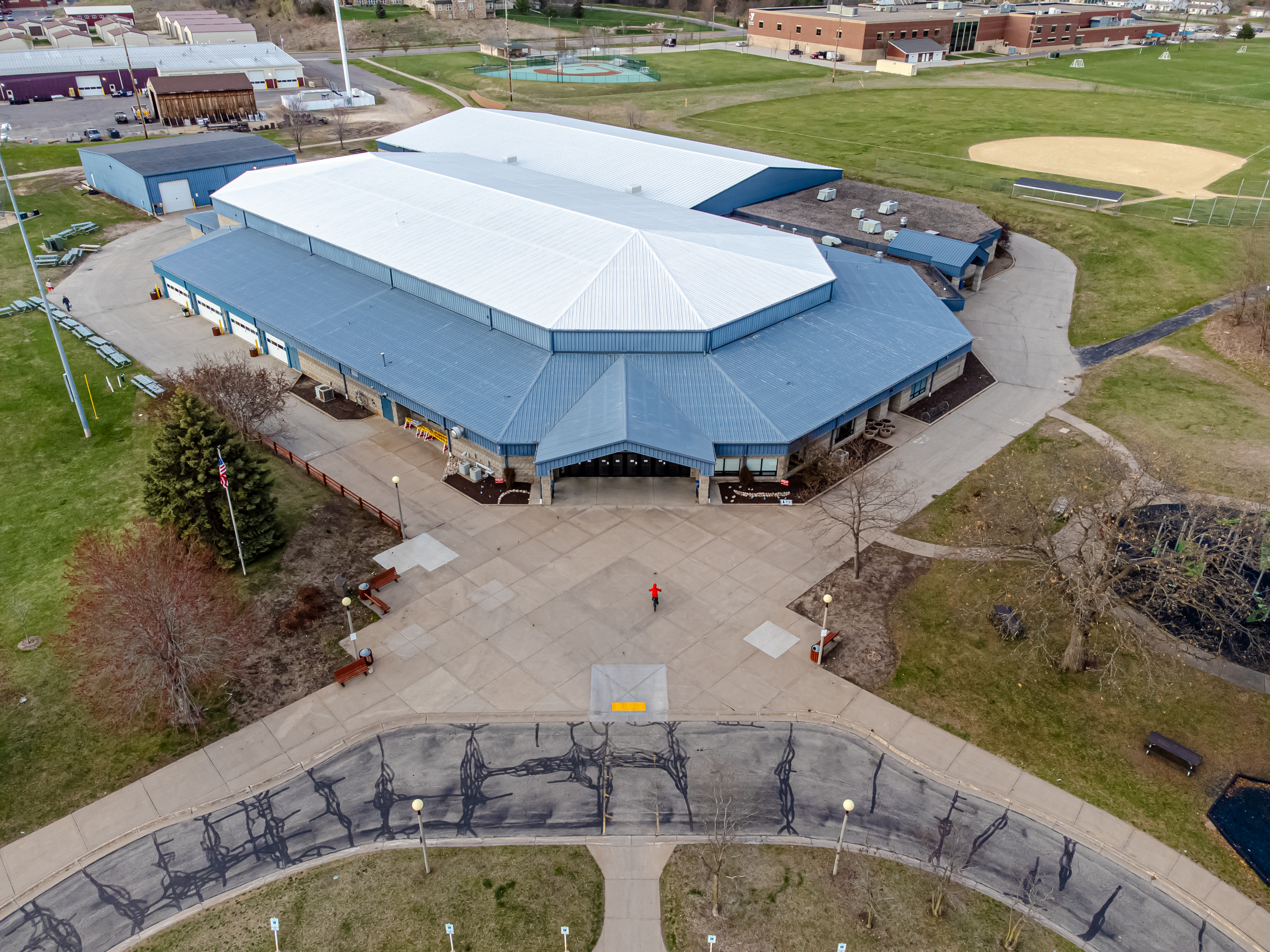
Onalaska Omni Center

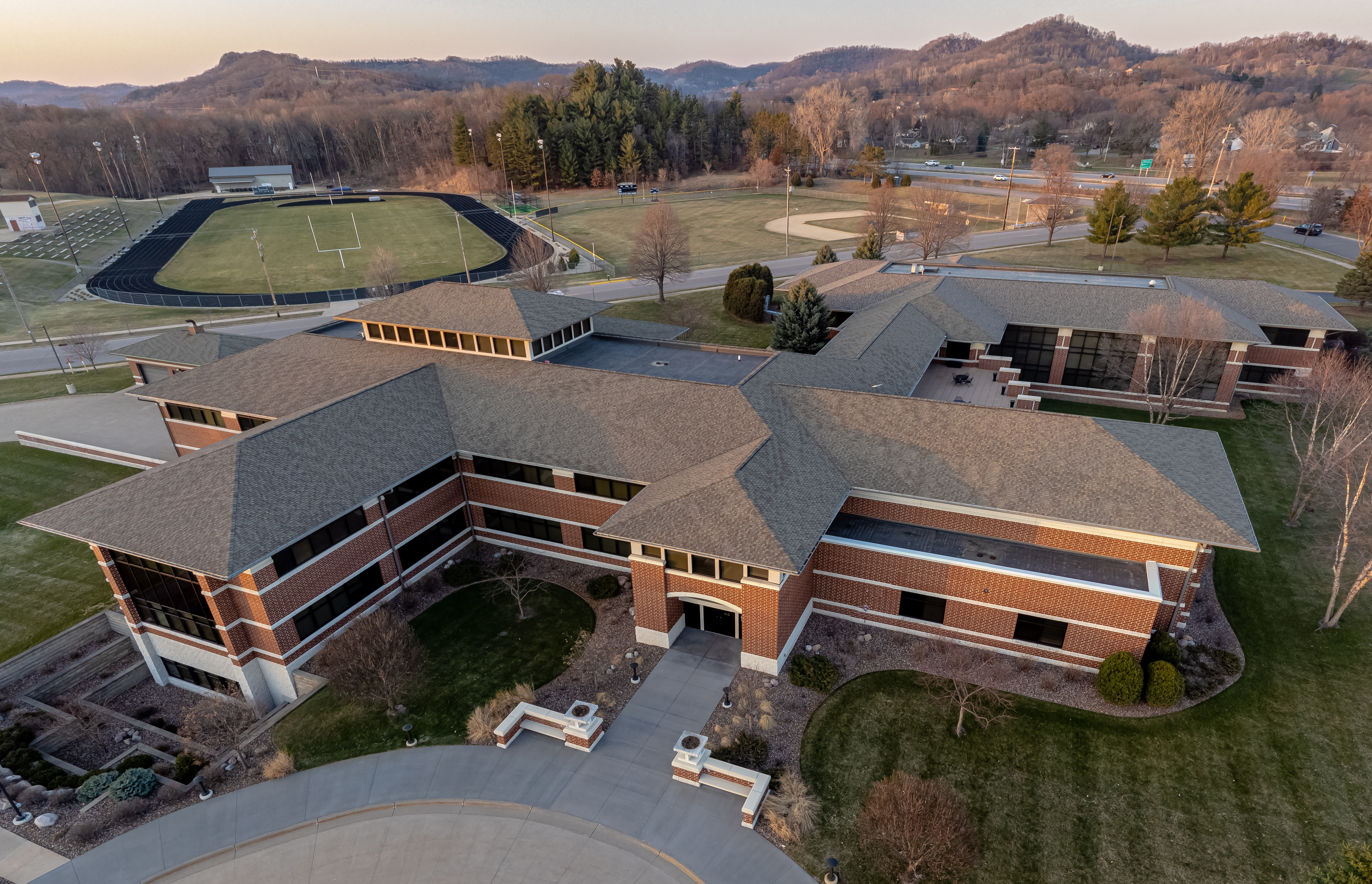
Altra Federal Credit Union headquarters

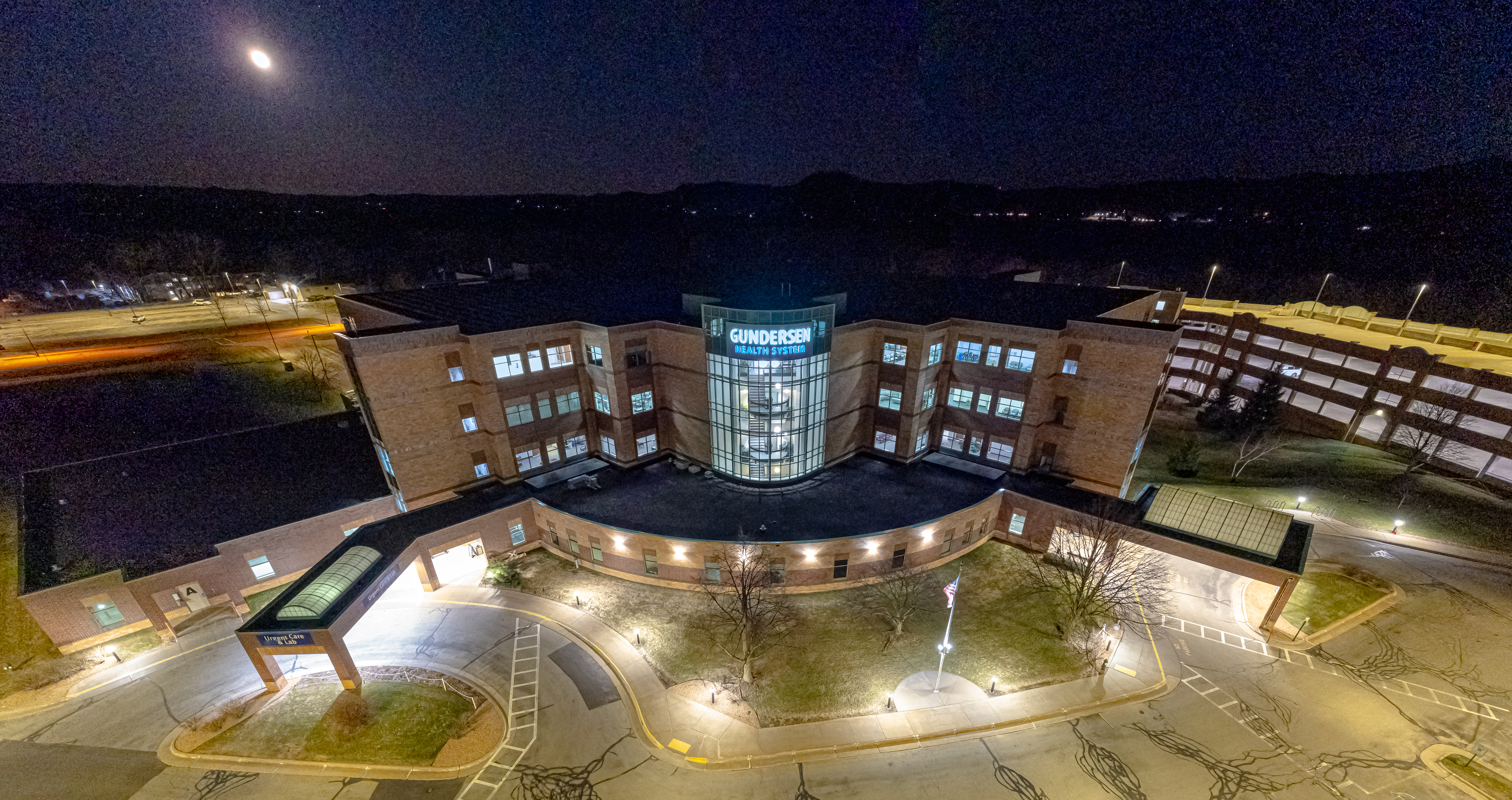
Gundersen Health System

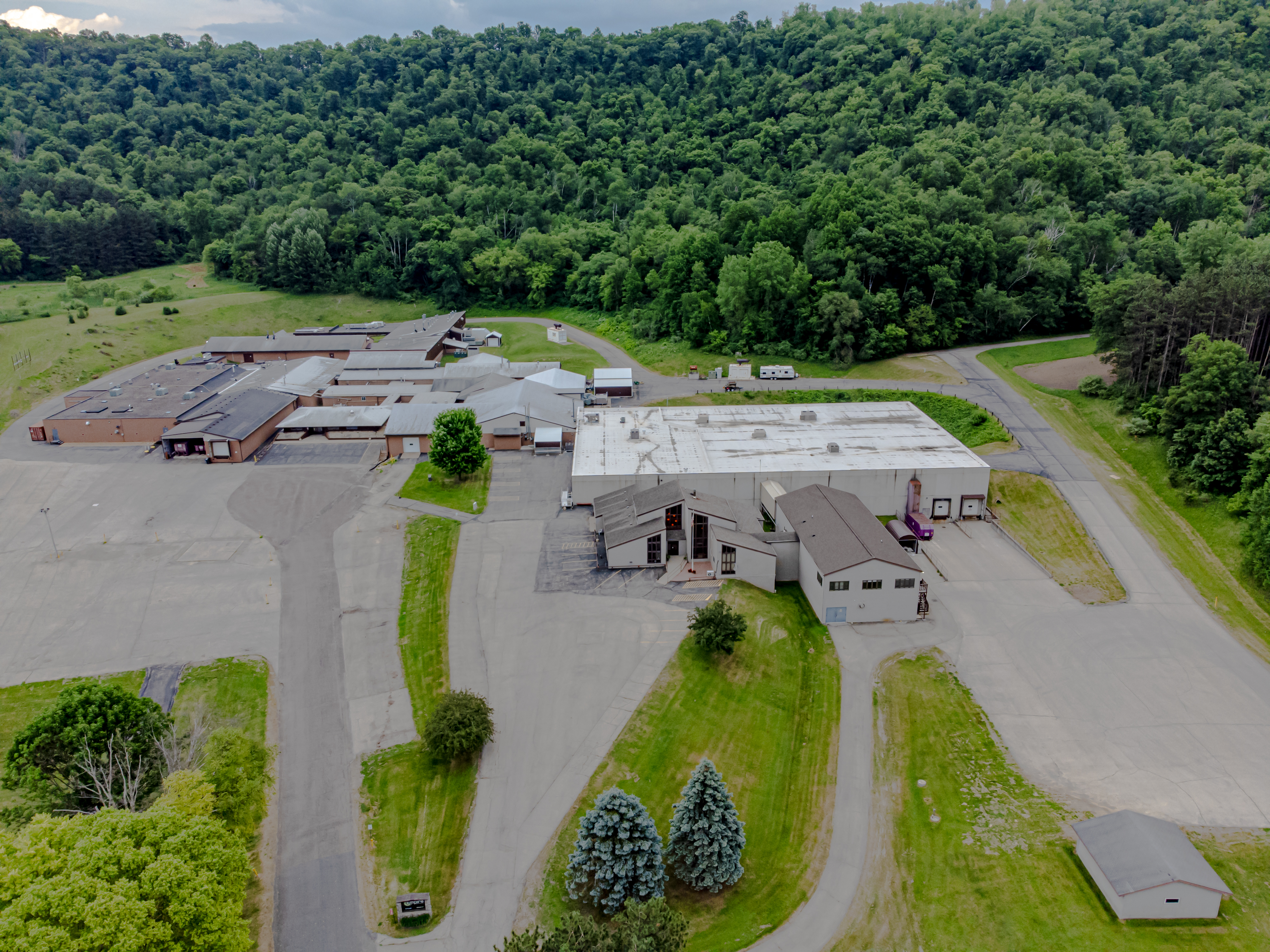
Empire Screen Printing

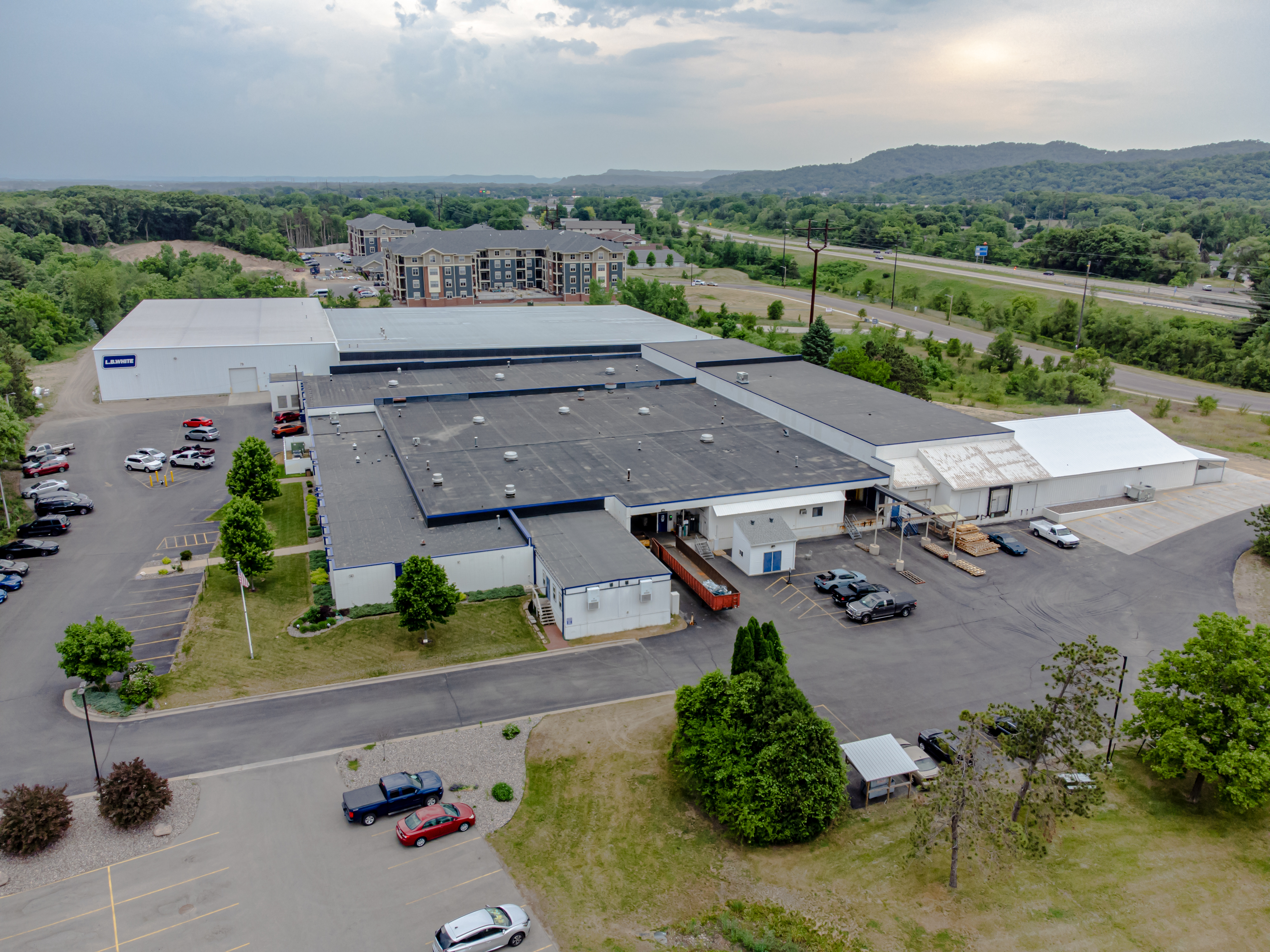
L.B. White

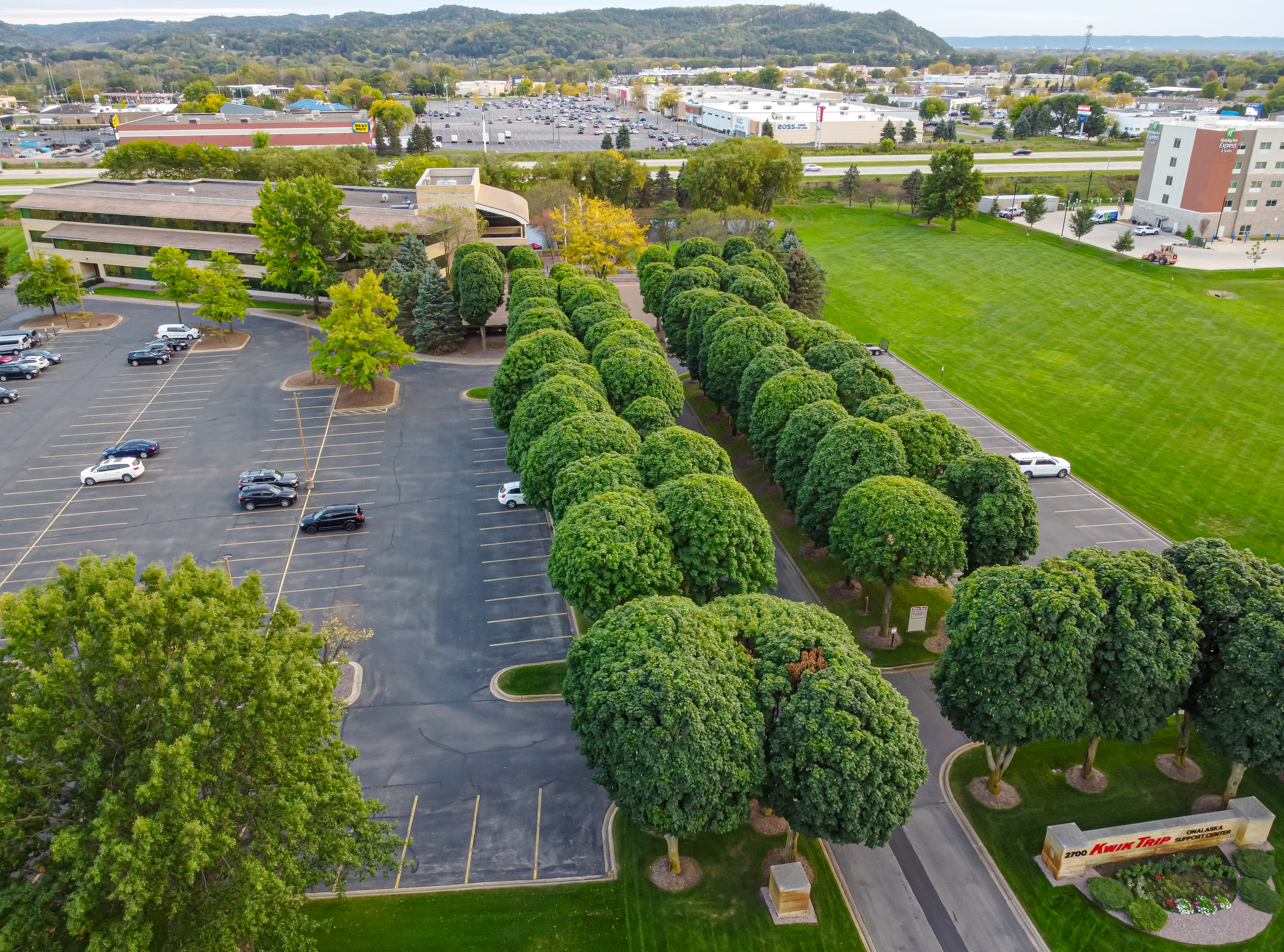
Kwik Trip Onalaska Support Center

== Transportation ==
Onalaska is served by the La Crosse Municipal Transit Utility, which provides public transit on three routes in Onalaska. Until 1963, Onalaska had a train station which served the Dakota 400.

La Crosse Regional Airport is nearby.

=== State and Federal roads serving Onalaska ===
- Interstate 90
- U.S. Highway 53
- Wisconsin State Highway 16
- Wisconsin State Highway 35
- Wisconsin State Highway 157

== Gallery of Historic Places ==
Buildings, sites, structures, districts, and objects in Onalaska listed on the National Register of Historic Places

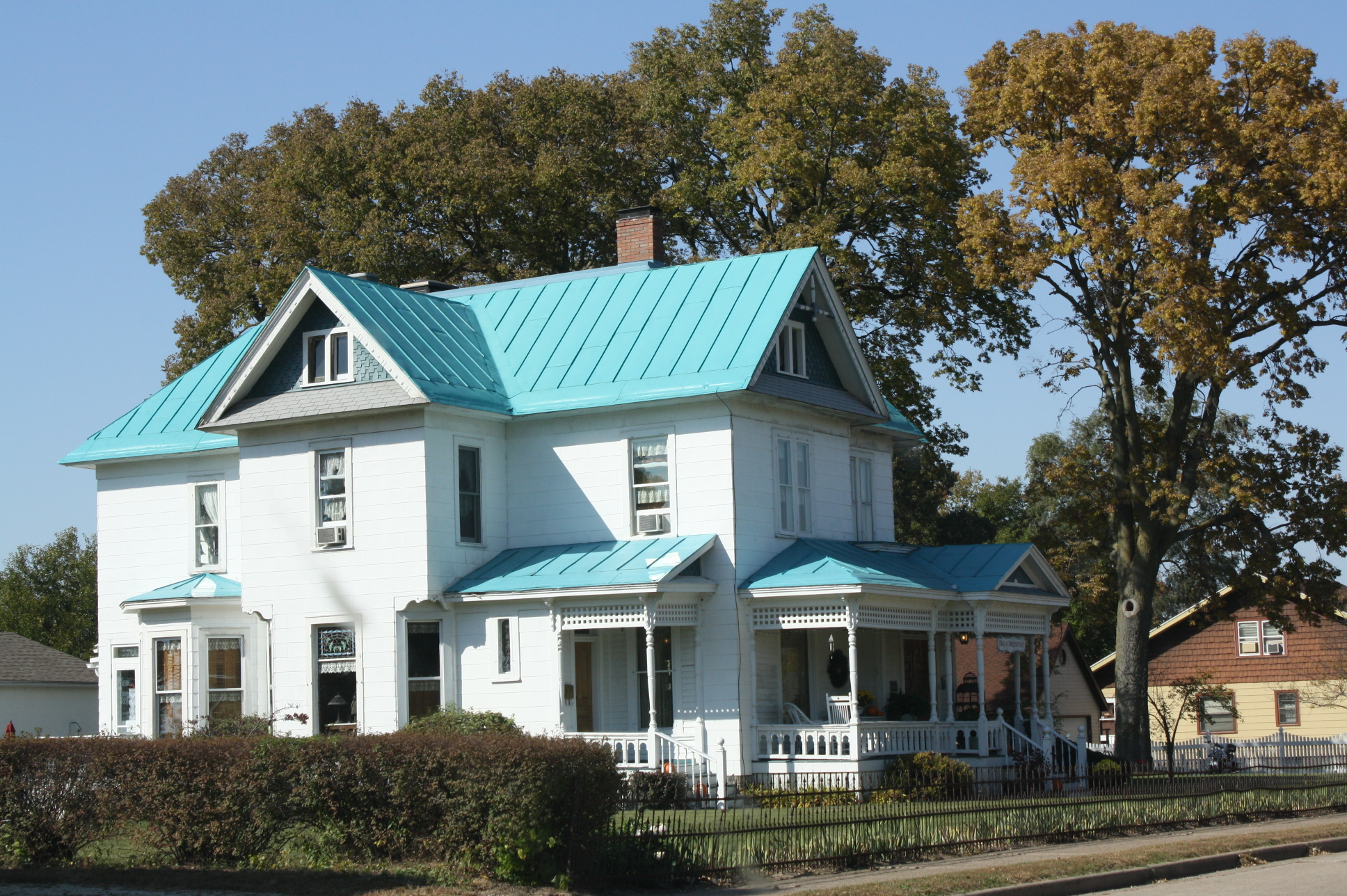
Frank Eugene Nichols House

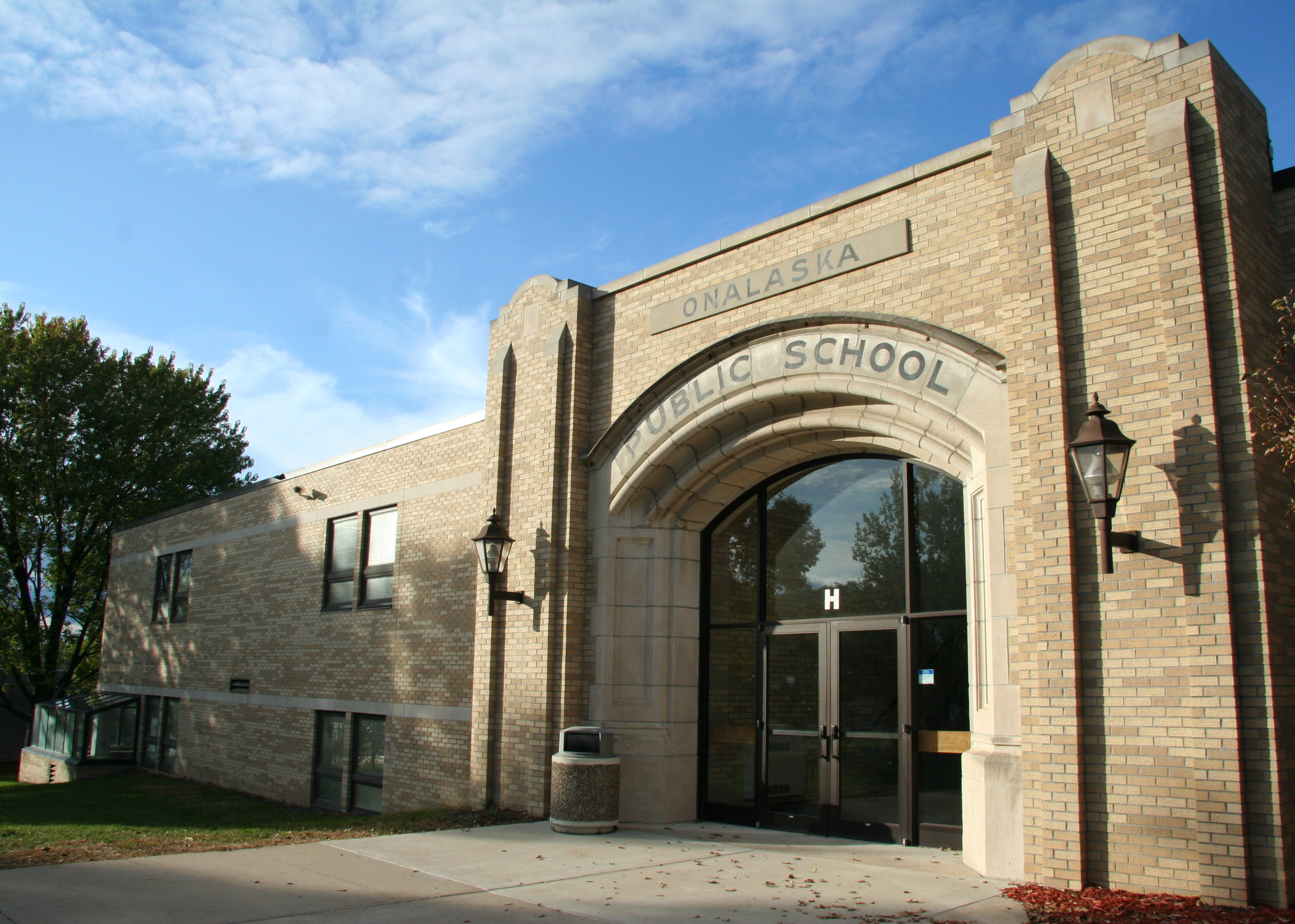
Onalaska High School

== Notable people ==
- Biddy Dolan, MLB player
- Tim Gullikson, tennis player
- Carlie Hanson, singer-songwriter
- Theresa Knutson, ice hockey player
- Ken Kratz (born c. 1960), lawyer, former district attorney of Calumet County, Wisconsin; law license was suspended for four months after sexting scandal
- Sandra Lee, television chef
- Misty Lown, dance teacher, studio owner and author
- Shane Mauss, stand-up comedian
- Tom Newberry, football player
- Frank Pooler (Wisconsin politician), Wisconsin businessman, state legislator, mayor of Onalaska
- Frank Pooler, choral director and songwriter ("Merry Christmas Darling")
- Mark Proksch, actor and comedian
- Clayton Rand, journalist and writer
- Harry W. Schilling, farmer, Wisconsin state legislator
- William H. Stevenson, U.S. Representative
- Matt Thomas, professional basketball player
- Leila Usher, artist

== Images ==
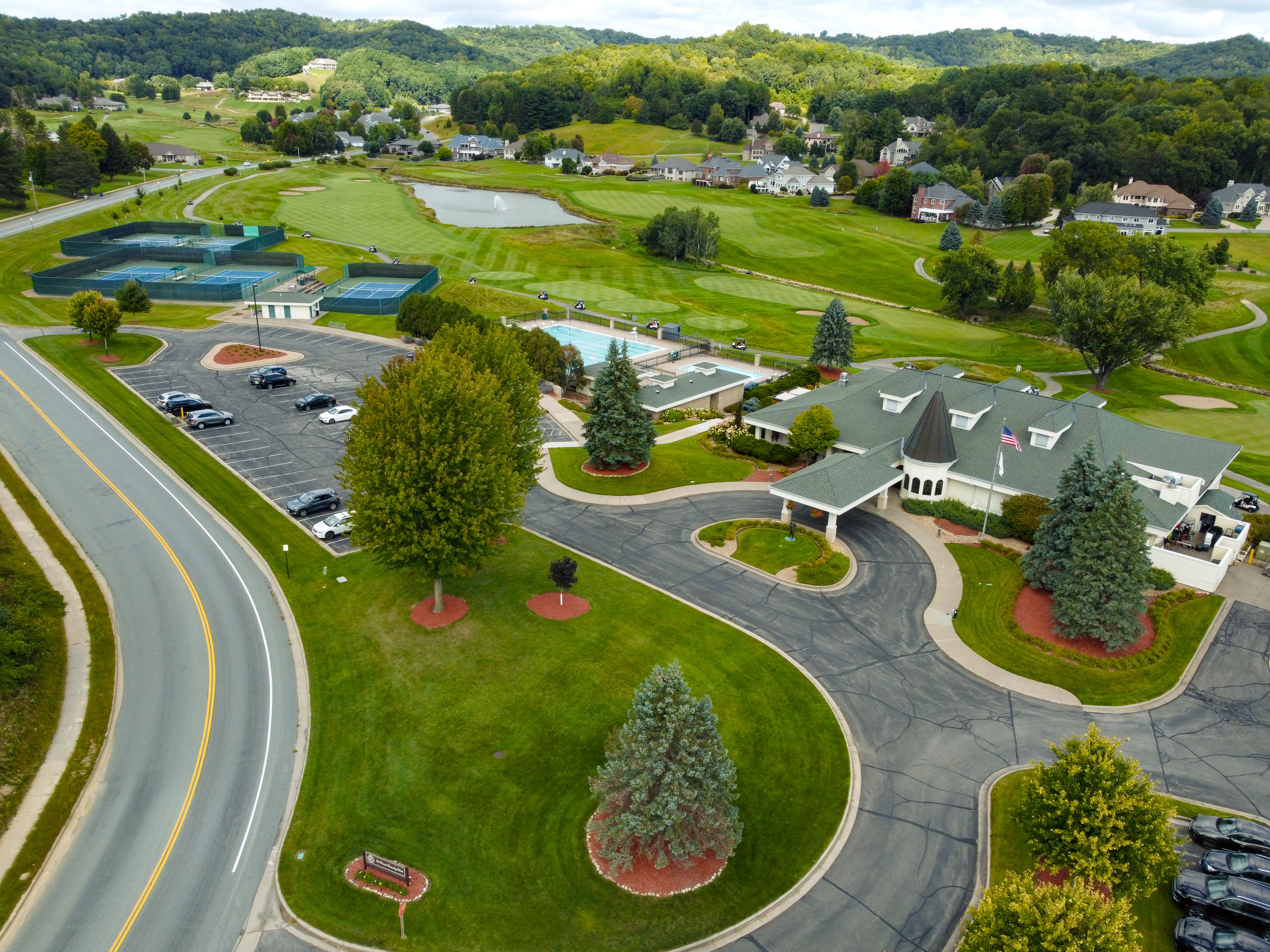
La Crosse Country Club in Onalaska

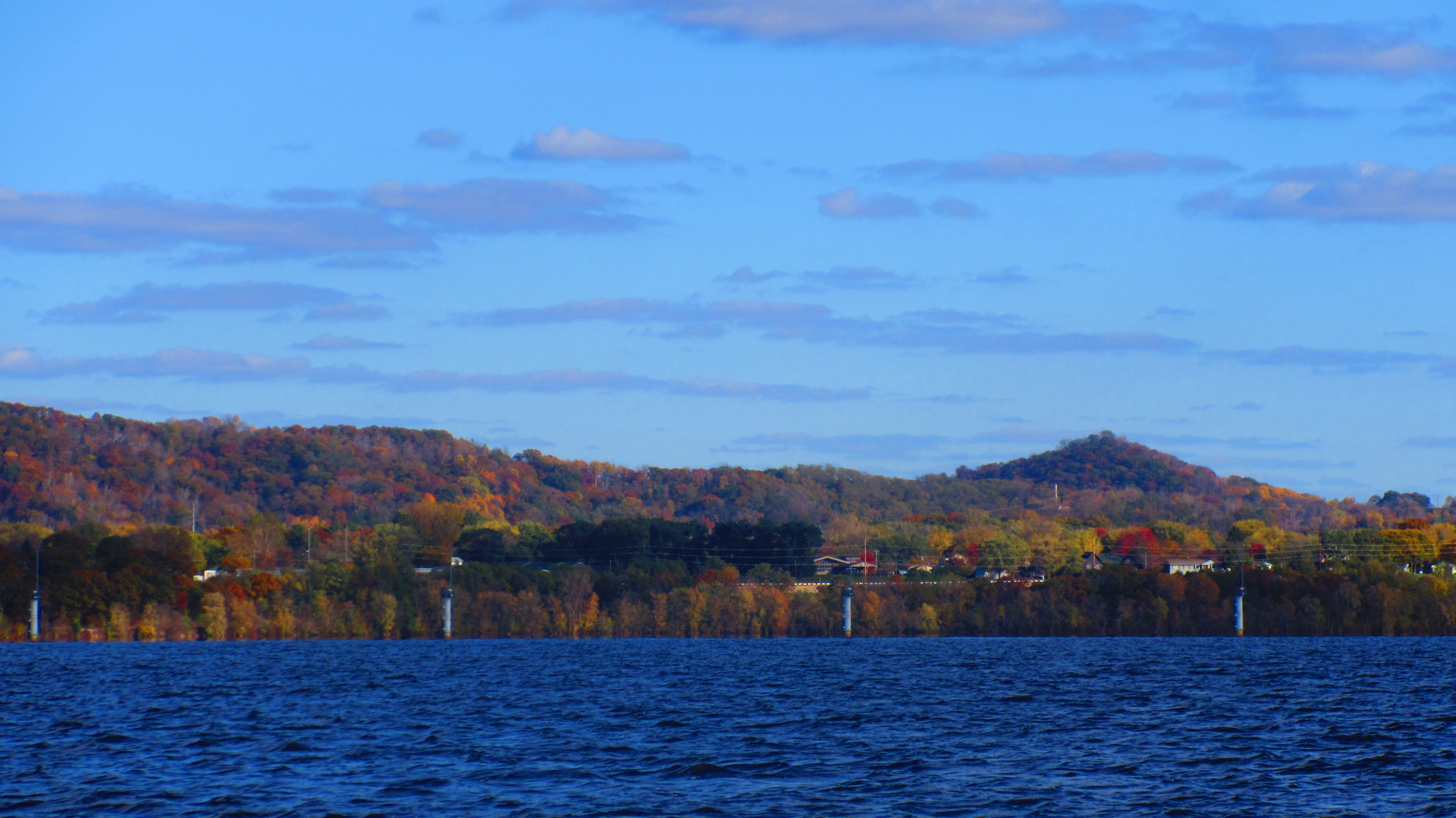
View of Onalaska Wisconsin from Lake Onalaska.

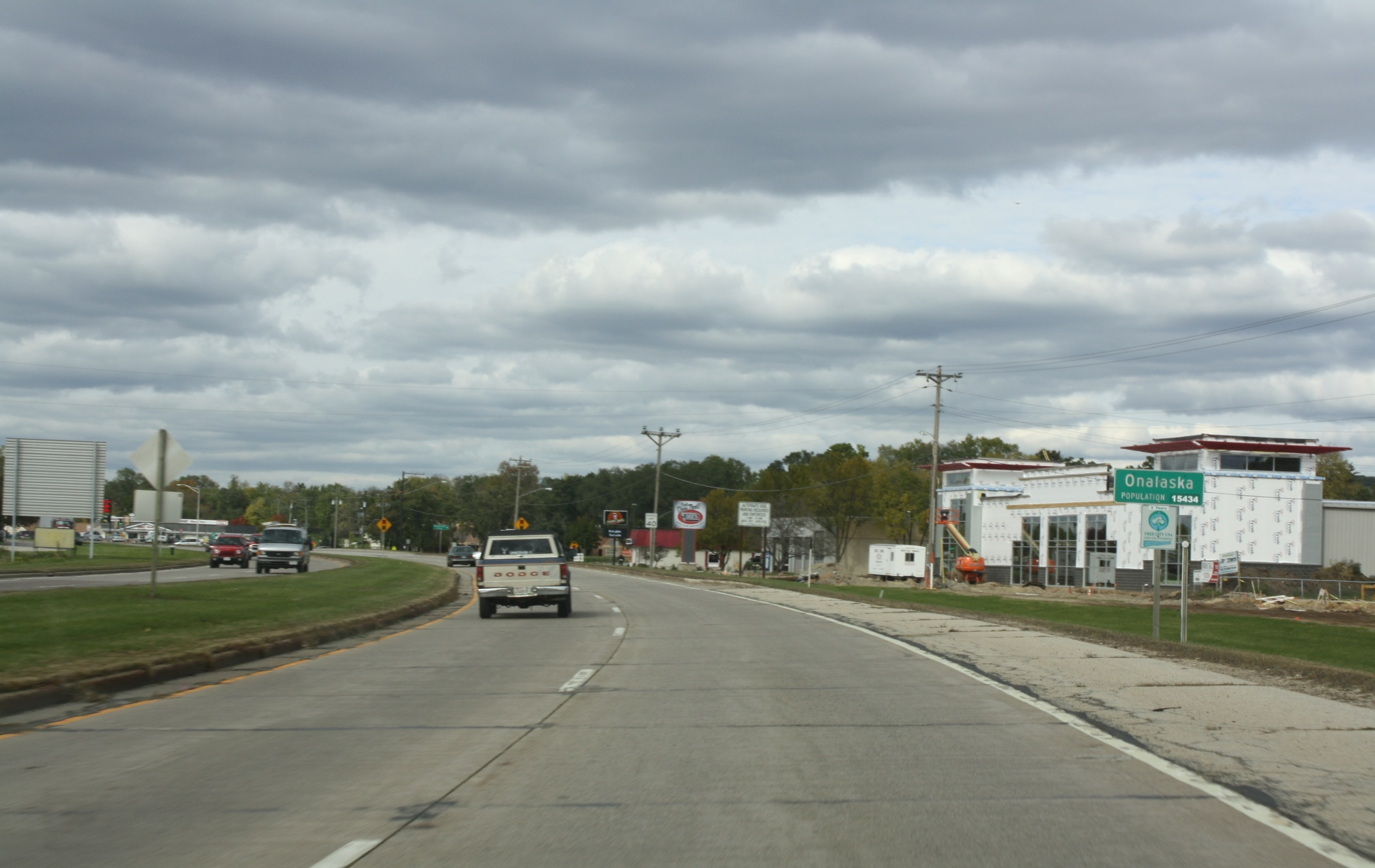
Looking north at the welcome sign on Wisconsin Highway 35

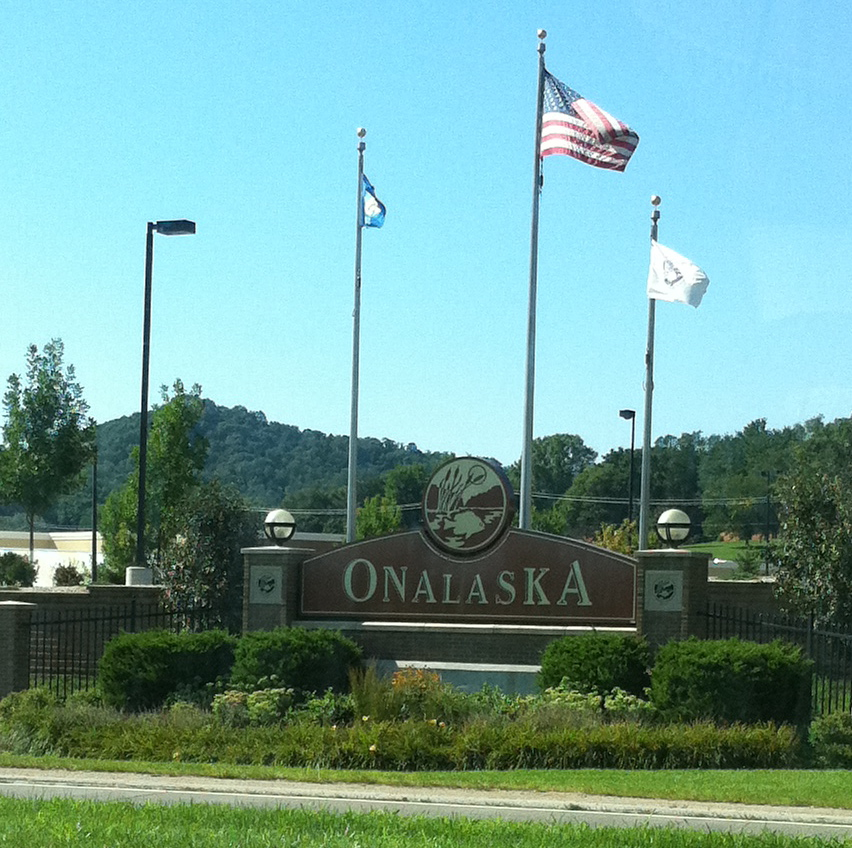
Welcome sign coming from Interstate 90 on Highway 16

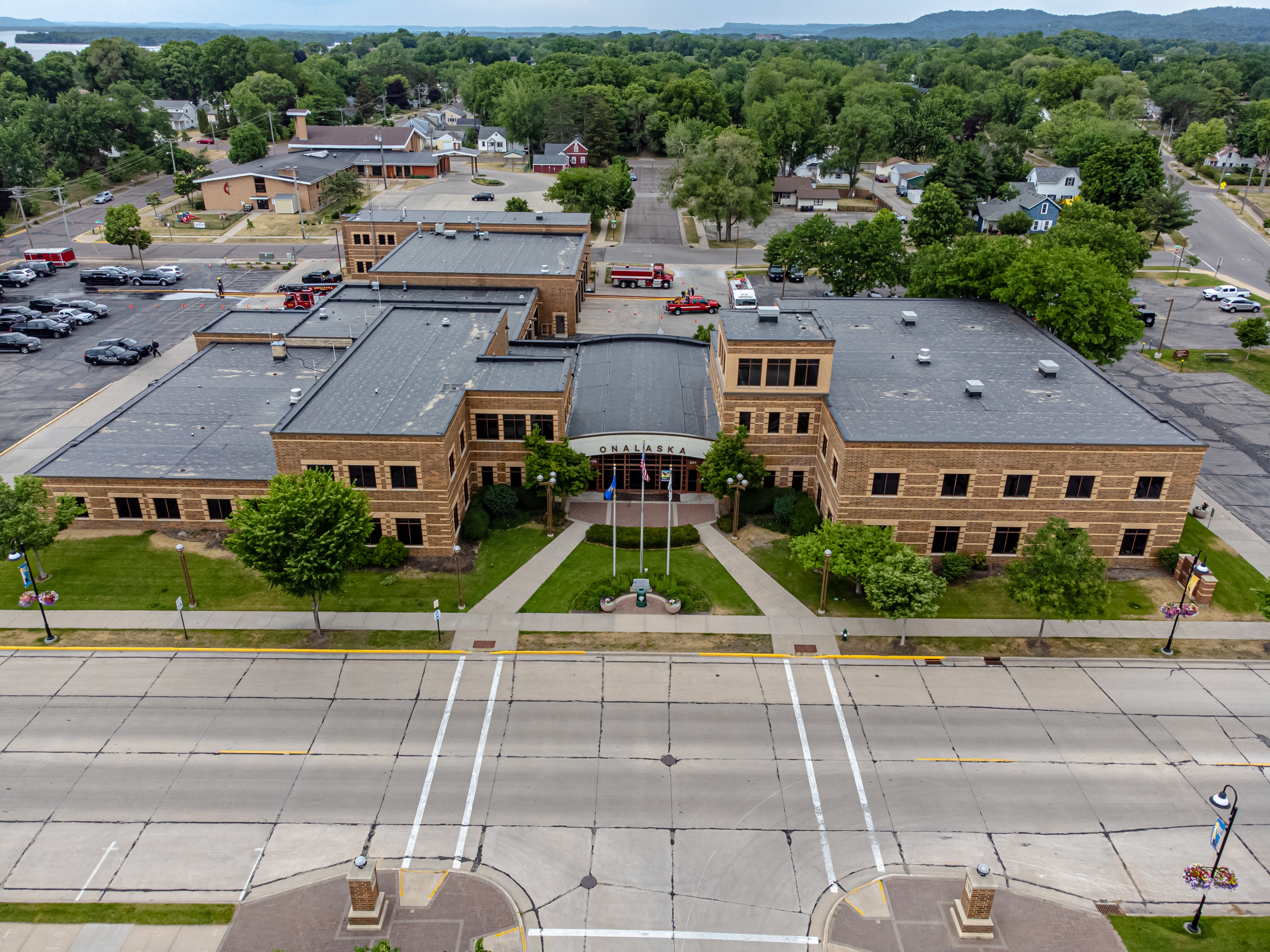
Onalaska City Hall

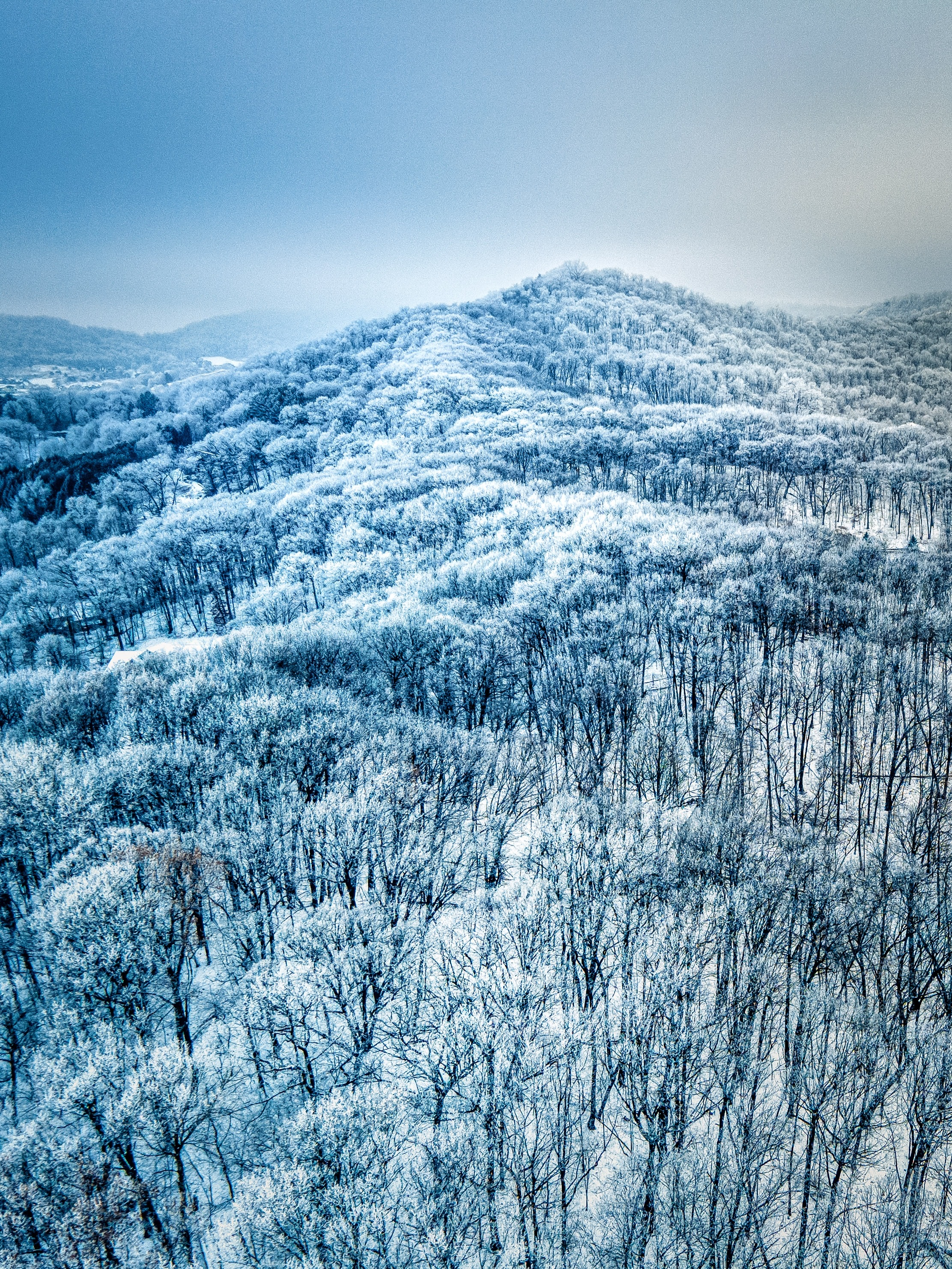
Onalaska by Air

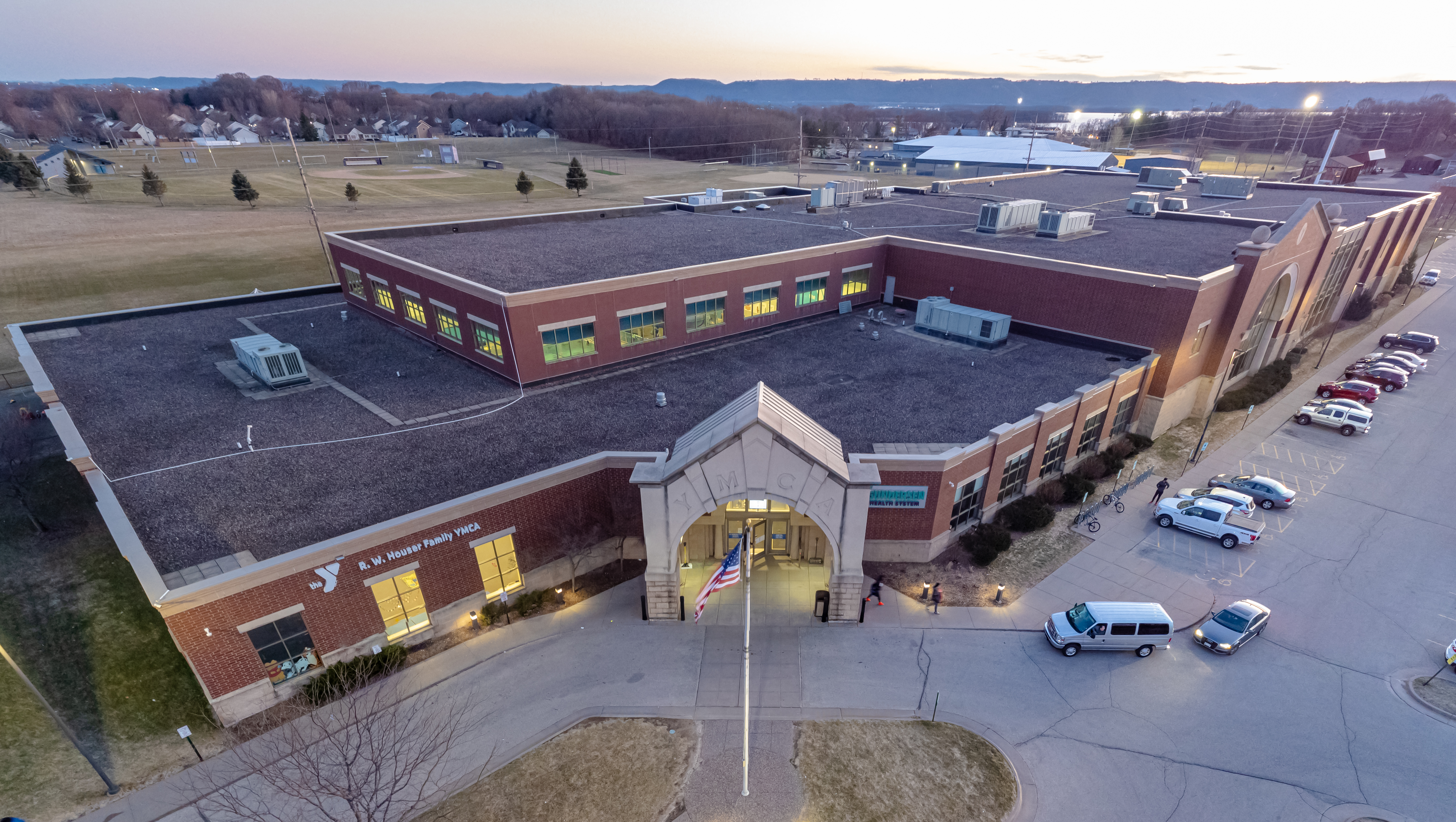
YMCA in Onalaska, Wisconsin

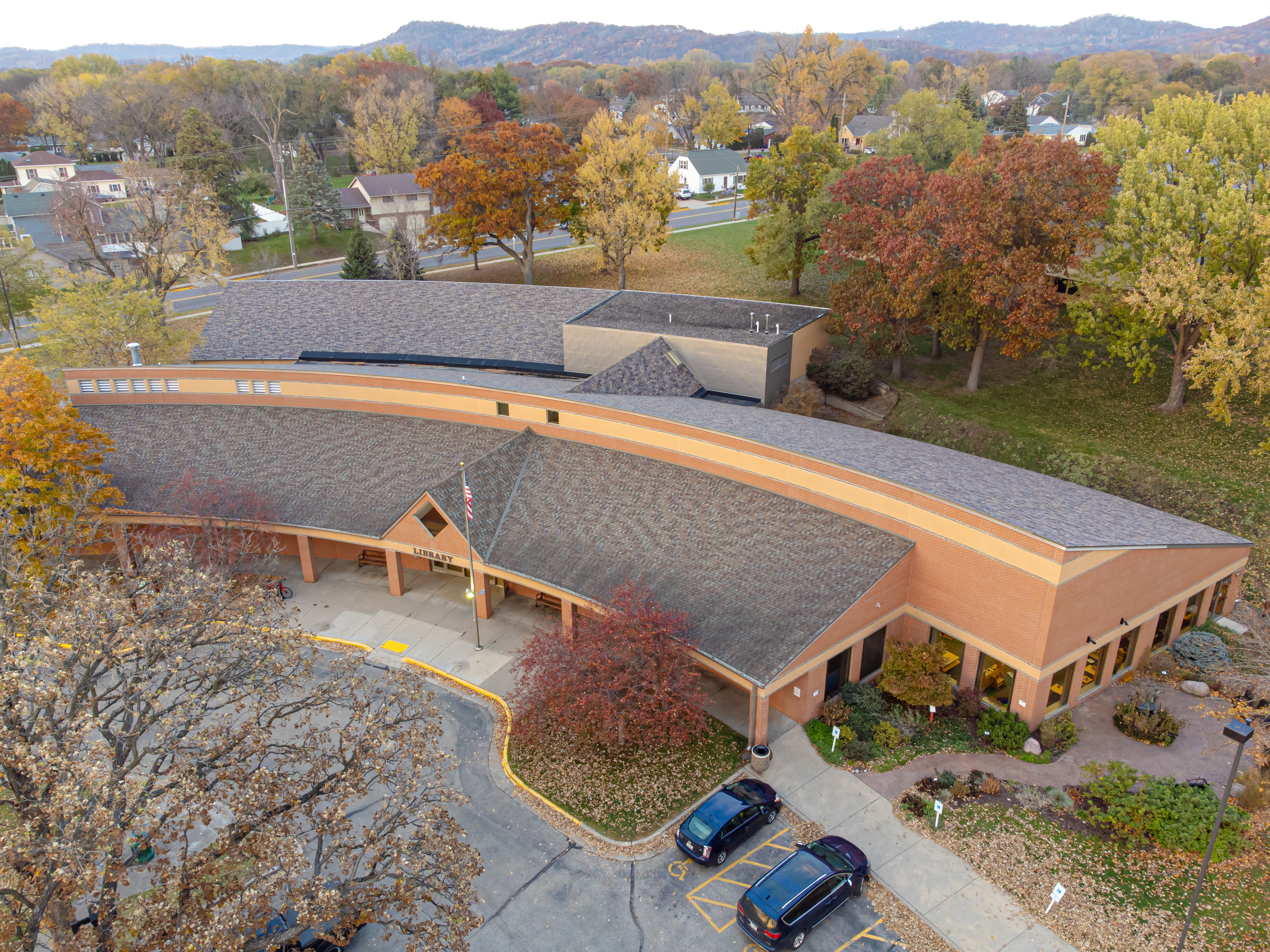
Onalaska library

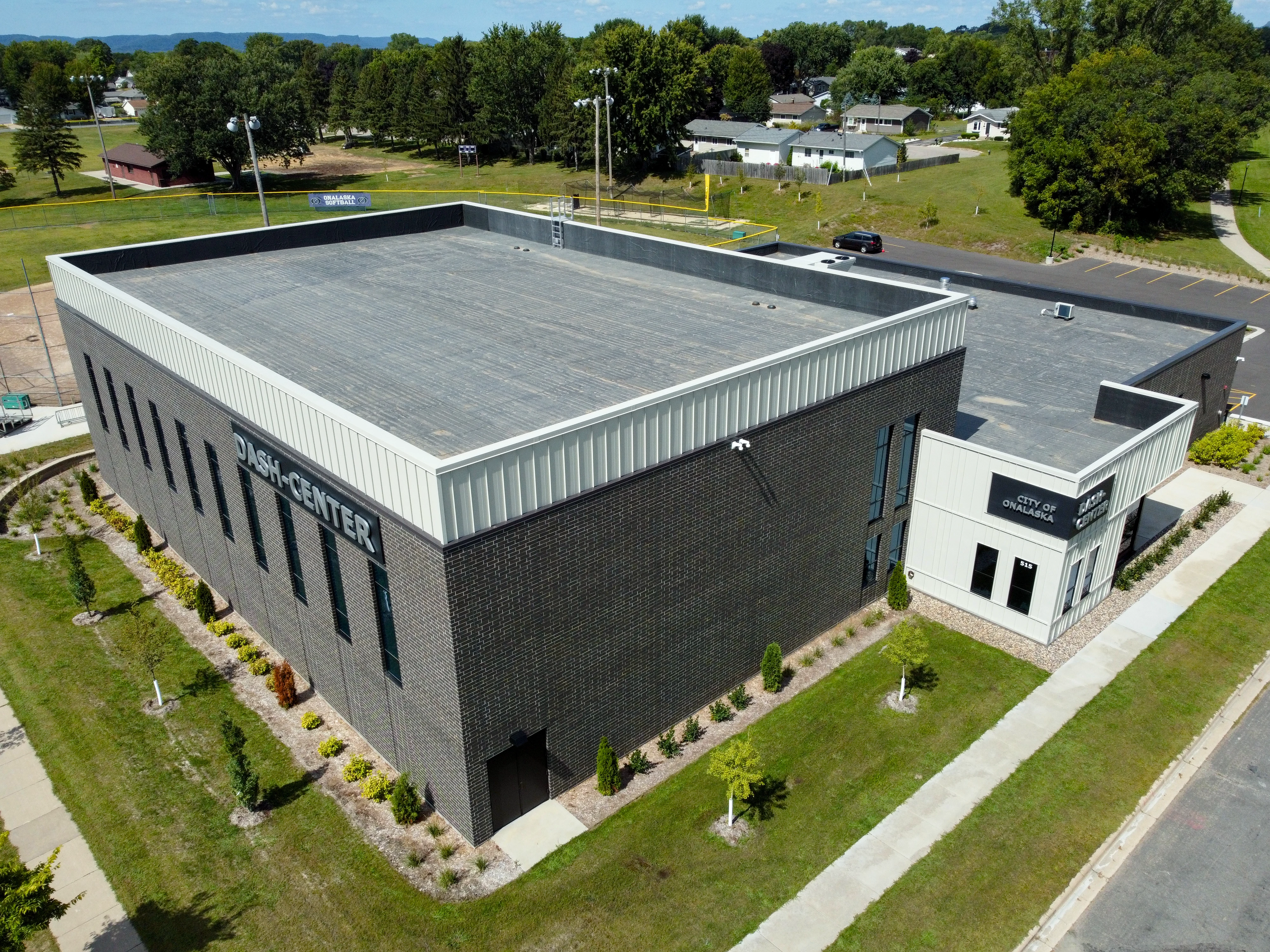
Dash–Center on Quincy Street

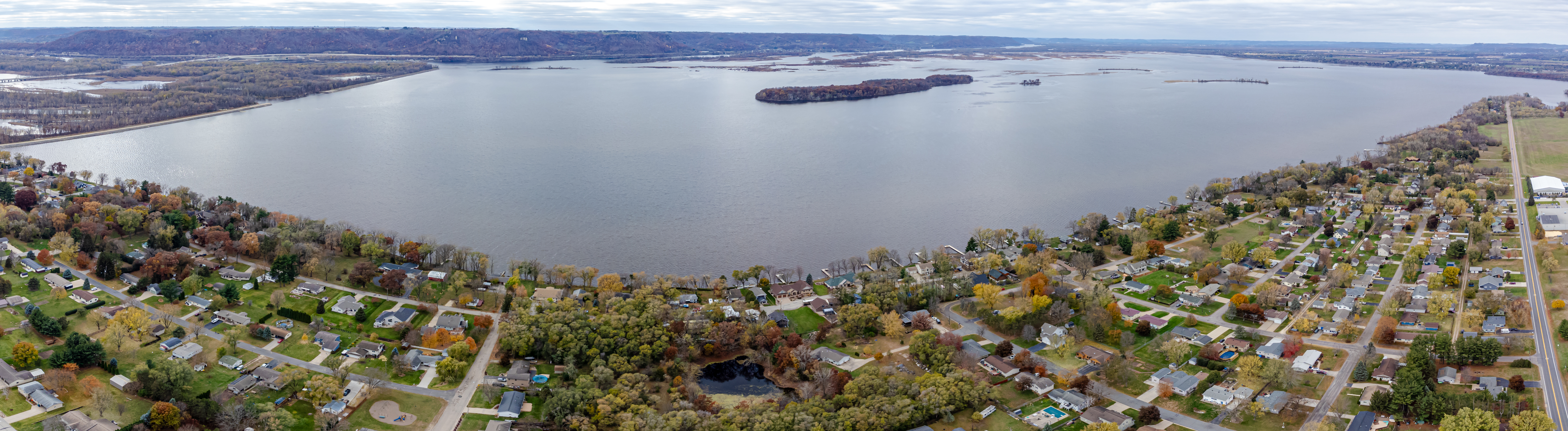
Lake Onalaska

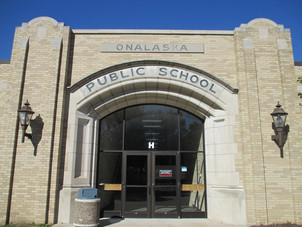
Onalaska High School

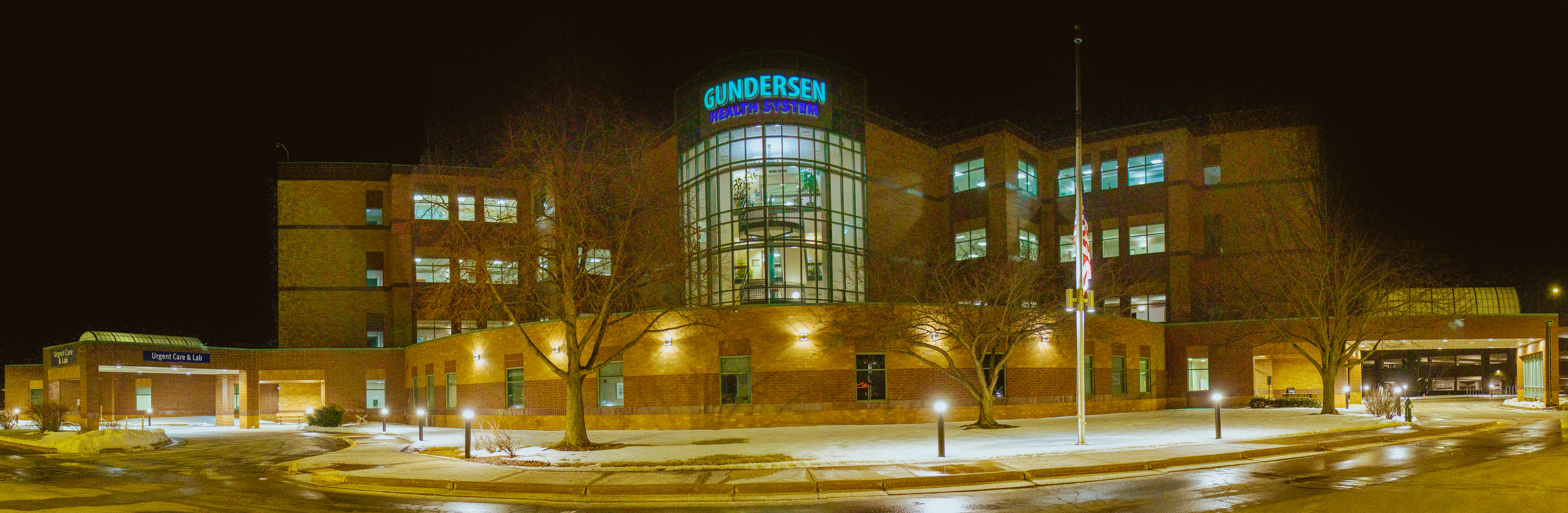
Gundersen Hospital

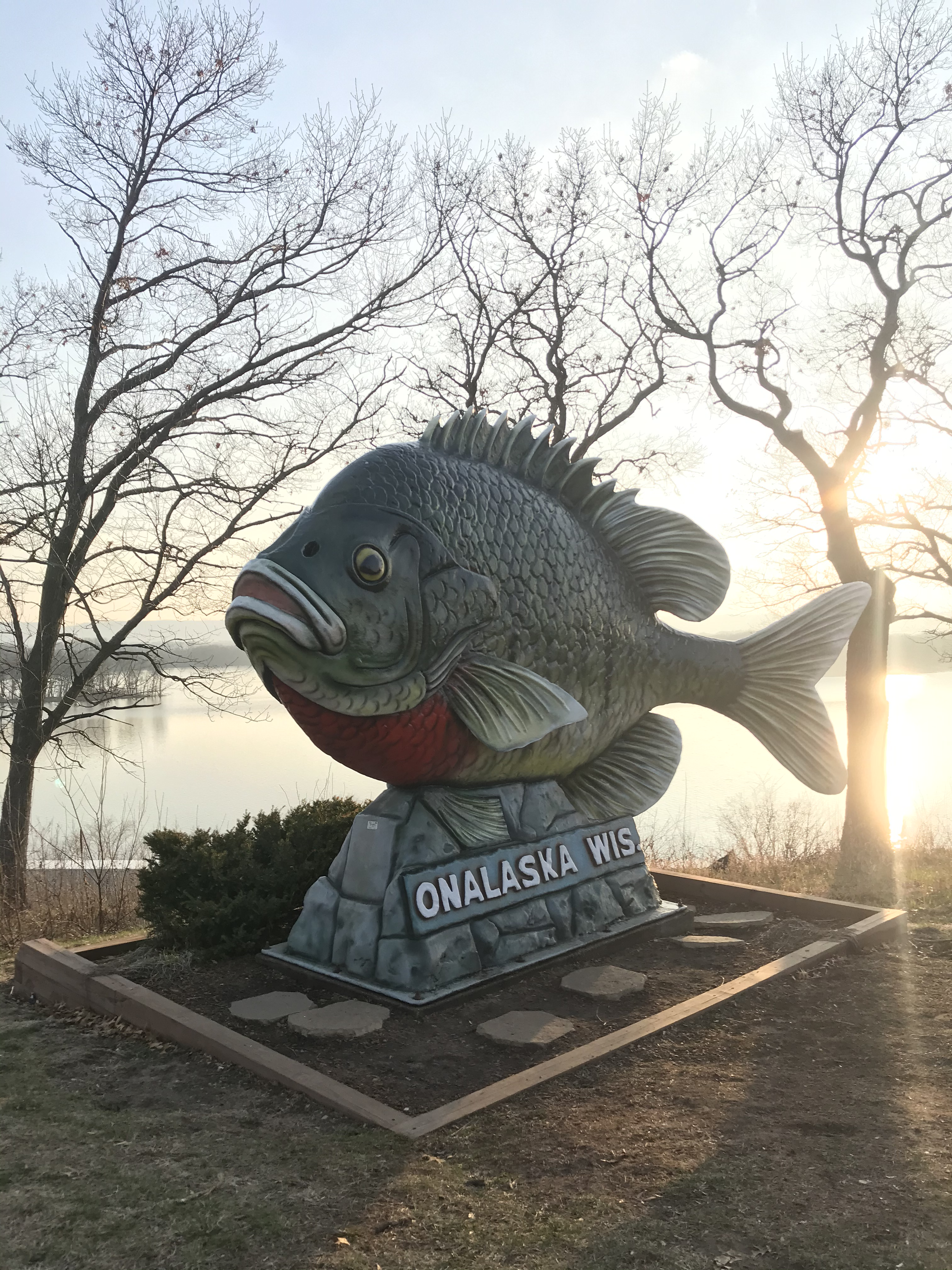
Sunny the Sunfish

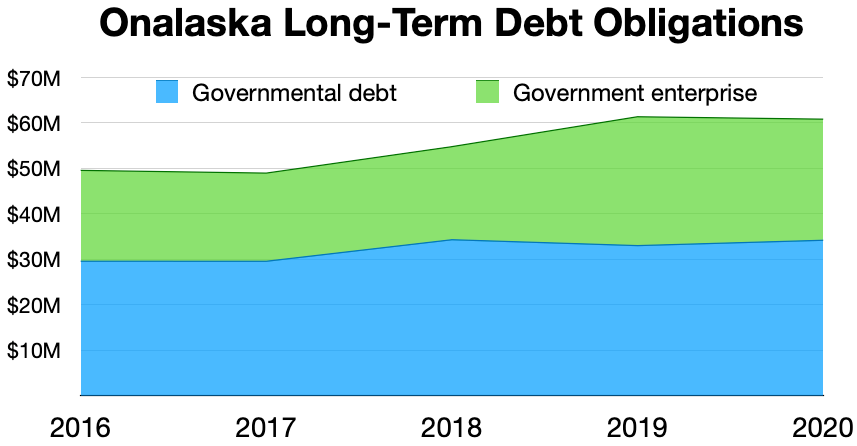
Onalaska long term debt

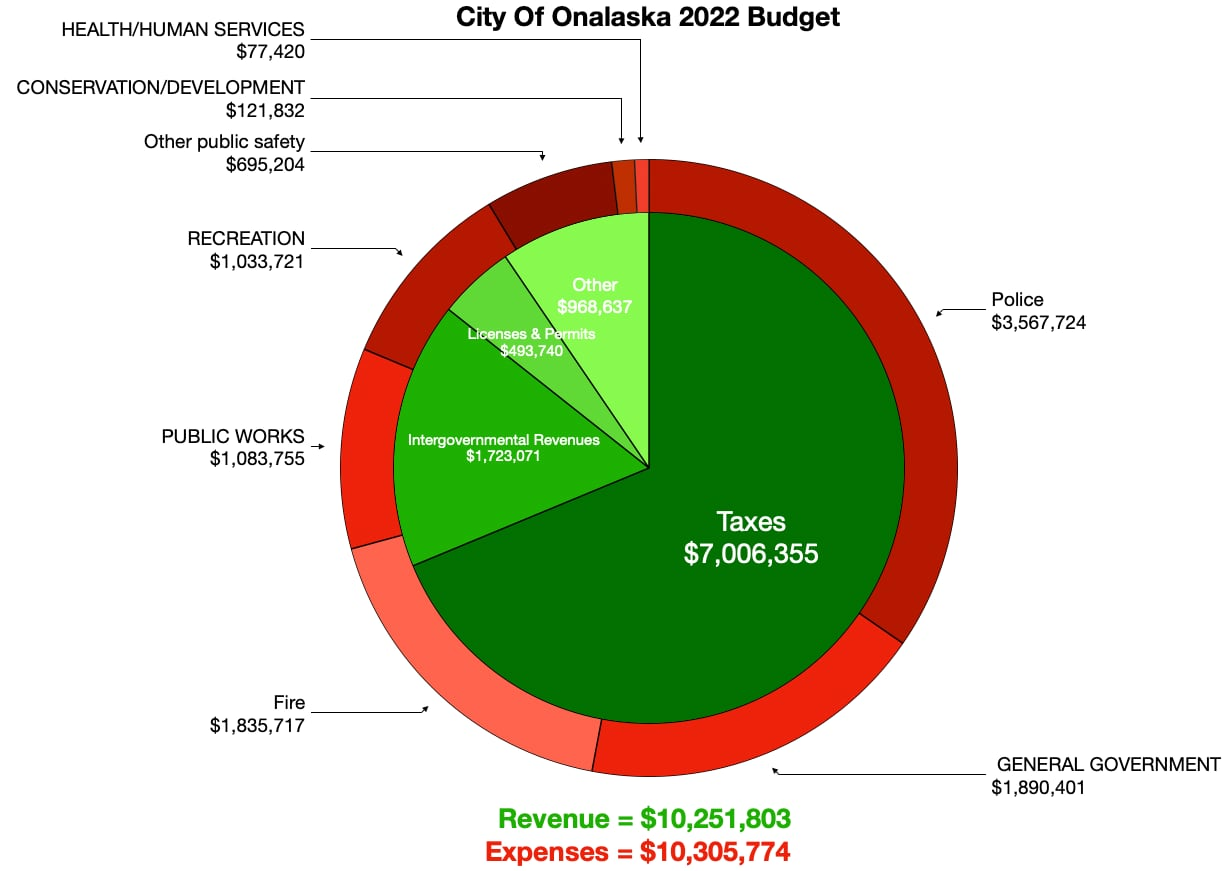
Onalaska 2022 City Budget
