= Wisconsin Highway 129 =

State highway in Grant County, Wisconsin, United States

State Trunk Highway 129
- WIS 129 highlighted in red

Route information
- Maintained by WisDOT
- Length: 2.69 mi (4.33 km)

Major junctions
- South end: US 61 / WIS 35 / WIS 81 southeast of Lancaster
- CTH-A on eastern border of Lancaster
- North end: US 61 northeast of Lancaster

Location
- Country: United States
- State: Wisconsin
- Counties: Grant

Highway system
- Wisconsin State Trunk Highway System; Interstate; US; State; Scenic; Rustic
← WIS 128	→ WIS 130

State Trunk Highway 129 (often called Highway 129, STH-129 or WIS 129) is a 2.69-mile (4.33 km) state highway in central Grant County, Wisconsin, United States, that runs from U.S. Route 61/Wisconsin Highway 35/Wisconsin Highway 81 (US 61/WIS 35/WIS 81) southeast of the city of Lancaster north to US 61 northeast of the city of Lancaster, bypassing the city to the east. WIS 129 is maintained by the Wisconsin Department of Transportation.

== Route description ==
WIS 129 begins at a modified T Intersection with US 61/WIS 35/WIS 81 in the Town of South Lancaster, southeast of the city of Lancaster. (US 61/WIS 35/WIS 81 continues northeast into the city of Lancaster before WIS 35/WIS 81 diverges to head west, with WIS 35 heading toward Bloomington and WIS 81 heading toward Cassville. US 61/WIS 35/WIS 81 heads south, with WIS 81 quickly diverging to head southeast toward Platteville and US 61/WIS 35 continuing south toward Tennyson and Dickeyville and then on to Dubuque, Iowa.) For its entire route WIS is two-lane road located in rural agricultural area.

From it southern terminus, WIS 129 heads briefly northeast before curving to head north for the remainder of its route. About 1.1-mile (1.8 km) from the beginning of the highway, WIS 129 crosses Lincoln Road, which connects with Lancaster, and approximately 0.5 miles (0.80 km) later it reaches County Trunk Highway A (CTH‑A). Between Lincoln Road and CTH‑A, WIS 129 runs along the eastern border of the city of Lancaster. (CTH‑A heads easterly to Union, Wisconsin Highway 80, and Rewey, before ending at U.S. Route 151. CTH‑A heads west through Lancaster as Elm Street to pass by the Grant County Fairgrounds and Lancaster High School, before connecting with US 61 [Madison Avenue]. Beyond Lancaster, CTH‑A, continues westerly toward Bloomington and Bagley.)

North of CTH‑A, WIS 129 continues north to cross City Limits Road, where it also leaves the Town of South Lancaster and enters the Town of North Lancaster. (City Limits Road heads briefly east before reaching a dead end, after about 1,200 feet [370 m], and heads east into Lancaster to end at US 61.) After about another 0.5 miles (0.80 km) WIS 129 curves to the northwest immediately before reaching it northern terminus at US 61. (The road continues very briefly northwest before turning west and eventually turning south to reconnect with US 61 in the city of Lancaster. US 61 heads southwesterly into the city of Lancaster and northerly toward Fennimore and La Crosse.)

== Major intersections ==
The entire route is in Grant County.

Location	mi	km	Destinations	Notes
Town of South Lancaster	0.0	0.0	US 61 / WIS 35 / WIS 81 – Lancaster, Tennyson, Platteville, Dickeyville, Dubuque	Southern terminus
Town of South Lancaster	1.6	2.6	CTH-A (East Elm Street) – Union, Rewey, Lancaster, Bloomington, Bagley	Junction is on the eastern border of the city of Lancaster
Town of North Lancaster	2.7	4.3	US 61 – Fennimore, La Crosse, Lancaster; Commercial Road	Northern terminus; roadway continues as Commercial Road
1.000 mi = 1.609 km; 1.000 km = 0.621 mi
