= Wisconsin Highway 182 =

State highway in Wisconsin, United States

State Trunk Highway 182
- WIS 182 highlighted in red

Route information
- Maintained by WisDOT
- Length: 33.41 mi (53.77 km)
- Existed: 1948–present

Major junctions
- West end: WIS 13 in Park Falls
- WIS 47 west of Powell
- East end: US 51 in Manitowish

Location
- Country: United States
- State: Wisconsin
- Counties: Price, Iron

Highway system
- Wisconsin State Trunk Highway System; Interstate; US; State; Scenic; Rustic
← WIS 181	→ WIS 183

State Trunk Highway 182 (often called Highway 182, STH-182 or WIS 182) is a 33.41-mile (53.77 km) state highway in Price and Iron counties in northwestern Wisconsin, United States, that runs east–west from Park Falls to Manitowish.

== Route description ==
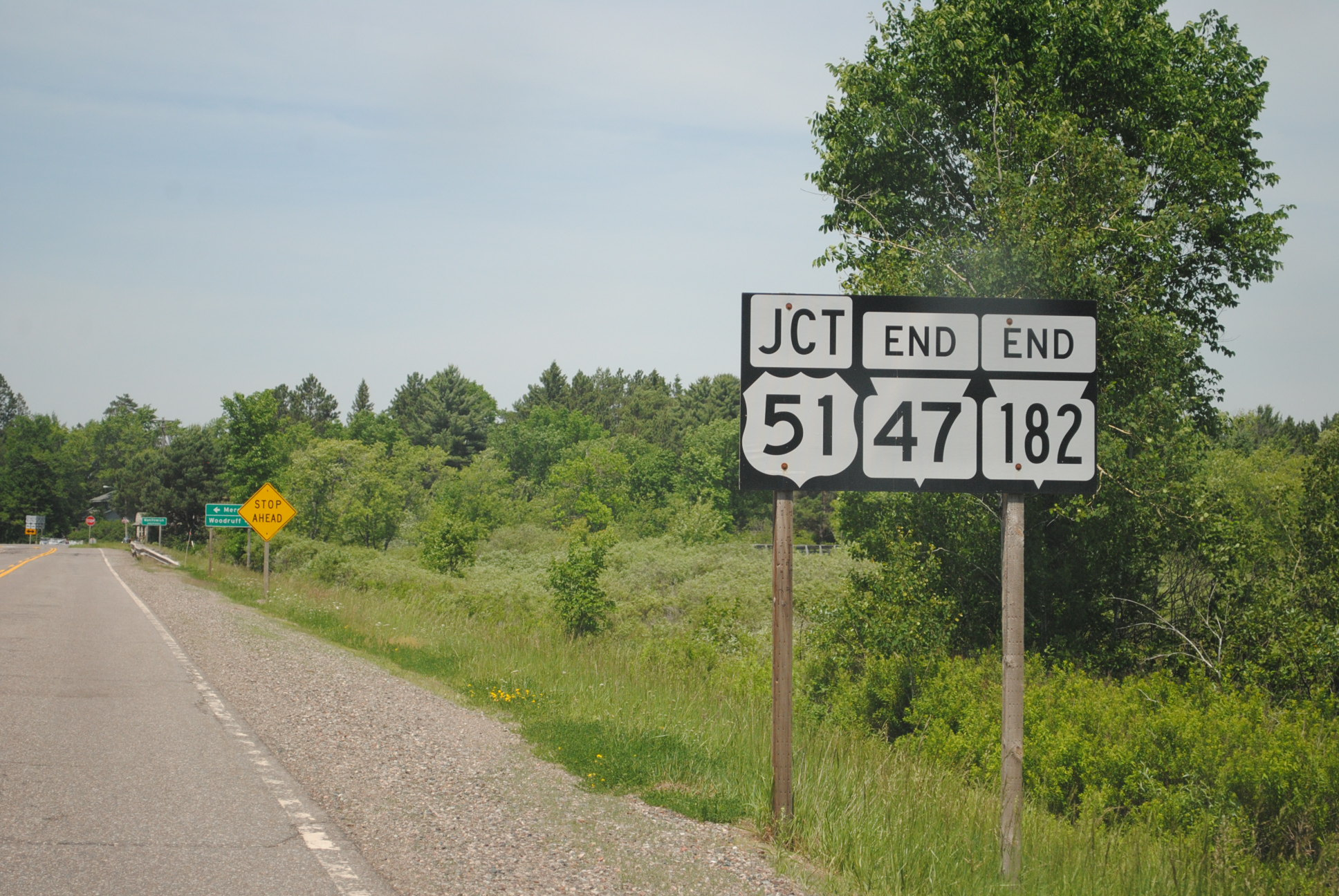
The northern terminus of WIS 182 (along with Wisconsin Highway 47) at Manitowish, June 2012

WIS 182 begins at a signal–controlled intersection with Wisconsin Highway 13 (WIS 13/South 4th Avenue) in western downtown Park Falls. (From the intersection the city street continues west as 1st Street South for one block before ending at South 5th Avenue. WIS 13 heads north as South 4th Avenue, but quickly becomes North 4th Avenue, toward Butternut, Mellen, and Ashland. WIS 13 heads south as South 4th Avenue toward Fifield, Phillips, and Prentice.) For its entire length, WIS 182 is a two-lane road.

From its western terminus, WIS 182 heads east as 1st Street South for about 1,450 feet (440 m) before crossing over the Flambeau River. East of the river the road is signed as Birch Street. Roughly 2,200 feet (670 m) after the river crossing the highway leaves Park Falls and enters the Town of Eisenstein. Immediately after leaving the city, the highway jogs to the northeast twice as it continues its otherwise eastern course. About 4.3 miles (6.9 km) after leaving Park Falls, the highway enters the Chequamegon–Nicolet National Forest. Approximately 8.5 miles (13.7 km) after entering the Forest, the highway assumes a northerly course.

Around 1.8 miles (2.9 km) along its northerly heading, WIS 182 leaves the Forest, the Town of Eisenstein, and Price County to enter the Town of Sherman in Iron County. Roughly 3.6 miles (5.8 km) north of the county line, and nearly a mile (1.6 km) west of unincorporated community of Springstead, the highway resumes an easterly course. After passing through Springstead and winding through multiple lakes for just over 7 miles (11 km), the highway again briefly resumes a northerly course. Nearly 2 miles (3.2 km) later the highway turns east again. After about another 1.7 miles (2.7 km), WIS 182 reaches its junction with Wisconsin Highway 47 (WIS 47), at a point just over a mile (1.6 kn) west of the unincorporated community of Powell. Running concurrent with WIS 47, WIS 182 heads briefly northwest before resuming a northerly course once again.

Roughly 2.3 miles (3.7 km) north of its southern junction with WIS 47, WIS 182/WIS 47 leaves the Town of Sherman and enters the Town of Mercer. Approximately 1.4 miles (2.3 km) later the concurrent highways cross Manitowish River and enter the unincorporated community of Manitowish. Almost immediately after entering Manitowish, WIS 182/WIS 47 reaches the eastern terminus of WIS 182 (as well as the northern terminus of WIS 47) at a T intersection with U.S. Route 51. (US 51 heads east toward Manitowish Waters and Woodruff. US 51 heads west toward Mercer and Hurley.) While WIS 182/WIS 47 ends at a T intersection with US 51, two roads run north from US 51 immediately east and west of that junction. On the east is Manitowish Road and on the west is Old Hwy 51 (a former routing of US 51). Both roads run straight northwest and closely parallel to each other for roughly 1.5 miles (2.4 km) before reconnecting with US 51.

== History ==
WIS 182 was designated along a section of roadway that was previously County Trunk Highway G (CTH–G) in 1948. The routing has remained unchanged since.

== Major intersections ==
County	Location	mi	km	Destinations	Notes
Price	Park Falls	0.00	0.00	WIS 13 – Butternut, Mellen, Ashland, Fifield, Phillips, Prentice; 1st Street South	Western terminus; roadway continues as 1st Street
Iron	Town of Sherman	29.65	47.72	WIS 47 south – Lac du Flambeau, Woodruff	Southern end of WIS 47 concurrency
Iron	Manitowish	33.41	53.77	US 51 – Manitowish Waters, Woodruff, Mercer, Hurley WIS 47 south	Northern end of WIS 47 concurrency
1.000 mi = 1.609 km; 1.000 km = 0.621 mi: Concurrency terminus
