= Mercer, Wisconsin =

- Town
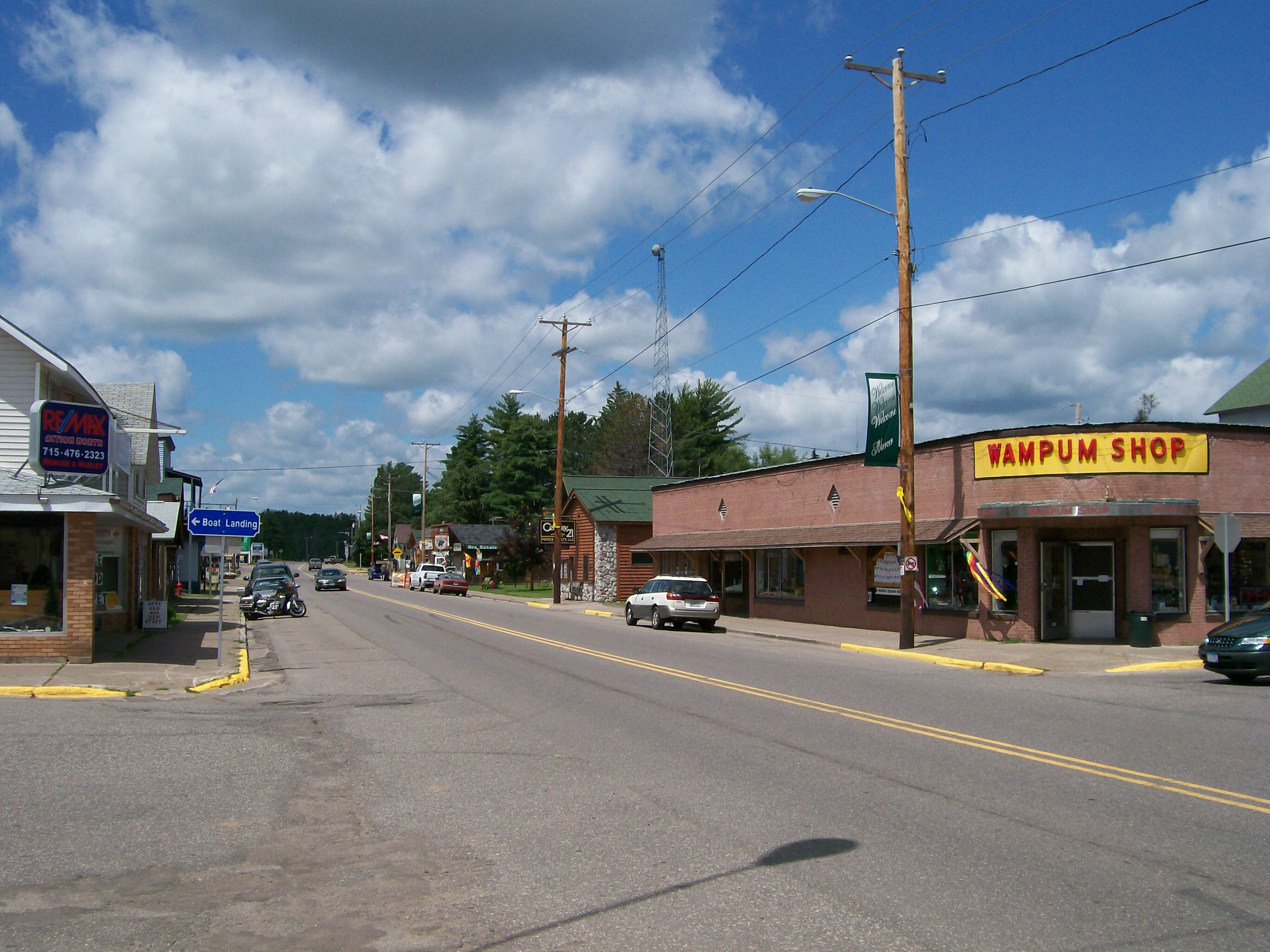
- Downtown Mercer in the census-designated place (CDP)
- Motto: Loon Capital of the World
- Location in Iron County and the state of Wisconsin.
- Coordinates: 46°10′3″N 90°6′15″W
- Country: United States
- State: Wisconsin
- County: Iron

Area
  - Total: 184.7 sq mi (478.5 km^{2})
  - Land: 168.0 sq mi (435.2 km^{2})
  - Water: 16.7 sq mi (43.3 km^{2})
- Elevation: 1,611 ft (491 m)

Population (2020)
  - Total: 1,649
  - Density: 9.814/sq mi (3.789/km^{2})
- Time zone: UTC-6 (Central (CST))
  - Summer (DST): UTC-5 (CDT)
- Area codes: 715 & 534
- FIPS code: 55-51200
- GNIS feature ID: 1583700

Mercer is a town in southern Iron County, Wisconsin, United States. The population was 1,649 at the 2020 census. The census-designated place of Mercer and the unincorporated communities of Carter and Manitowish are located within the town.

Mercer identifies itself as the "Loon Capital of the World" to promote tourism. A wildlife study found Mercer had the highest concentration of common loons in the world. In front of the Mercer Chamber of Commerce's information center, there is a 16-foot (4.9 m), 2,000-pound (910 kg) statue named "Claire de Loon". Mercer also hosts an annual "Loon Day" festival, which features an arts and crafts fair, live music and a loon calling contest.

== Geography ==
According to the United States Census Bureau, the town has a total area of 184.8 square miles (478.5 km^{2}), of which 168.0 square miles (435.2 km^{2}) is land and 16.7 square miles (43.3 km^{2}) (9.05%) is water.

== Demographics ==
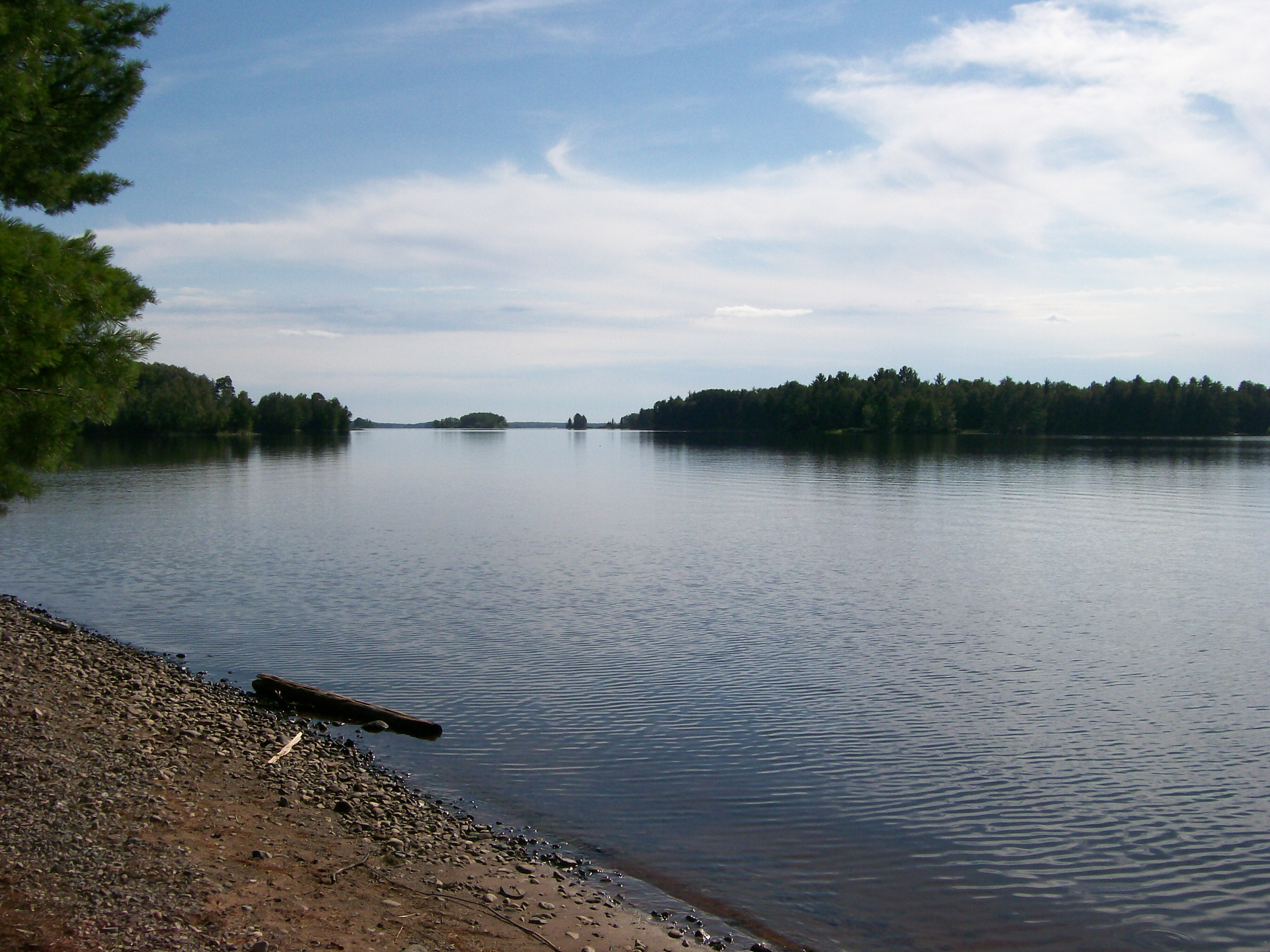
The Turtle-Flambeau Flowage is a major source of summer tourism

As of the census of 2000, there were 1,732 people, 820 households, and 519 families residing in the town. The population density was 10.3 people per square mile (4.0/km^{2}). There were 1,926 housing units at an average density of 11.5 per square mile (4.4/km^{2}). The racial makeup of the town was 98.96% White, 0.12% African American, 0.18% Native American, 0.17% Asian, 0.17% from other races, and 0.40% from two or more races. Hispanic or Latino of any race were 0.69% of the population.

There were 820 households, out of which 17.7% had children under the age of 18 living with them, 54.9% were married couples living together, 5.7% had a female householder with no husband present, and 36.7% were non-families. 31.5% of all households were made up of individuals, and 16.5% had someone living alone who was 65 years of age or older. The average household size was 2.11 and the average family size was 2.63.

In the town, the population was spread out, with 16.7% under the age of 18, 3.6% from 18 to 24, 22.6% from 25 to 44, 31.5% from 45 to 64, and 25.5% who were 65 years of age or older. The median age was 50 years. For every 100 females, there were 101.9 males. For every 100 females age 18 and over, there were 101.7 males.

The median income for a household in the town was $31,413, and the median income for a family was $39,402. Males had a median income of $29,911 versus $22,042 for females. The per capita income for the town was $19,087. About 8.7% of families and 13.5% of the population were below the poverty line, including 19.7% of those under age 18 and 11.2% of those age 65 or over.

== Education ==
Mercer is served by the Mercer School District, with about 140 K–12 students in a single school.

== Transportation ==
US Highway 51 runs through Mercer generally on a north–south trajectory, but through downtown Mercer it runs east-west. State Highway 47 and State Highway 182 also pass through the town.

== Tourism ==
Mercer's main industry is tourism. Year-round activities include fishing, hunting, camping, canoeing, kayaking, biking, skiing, bird watching, snowmobiling, and ATV/UTVing. A large portion of the Turtle-Flambeau Flowage is located in Mercer, and there are 214 other inland lakes in the surround area.

The Mercer Area Historical Society is housed in the former train station. It contains a small museum of local history. Other buildings include a jail, schoolhouse, barbershop, and a reconstructed caboose.

Each year on the first Wednesday in August the town hosts Loon Day. The town hosts vendors from the area to sell their arts and products. They also have food from local restaurants and live music. The annual event brings a lot of visitors to the town each year.

== Notable people ==
- Ralph Capone, brother of Al Capone
- Charles L. Lacy, resort owner and Wisconsin State Representative, lived in the town

== Images ==
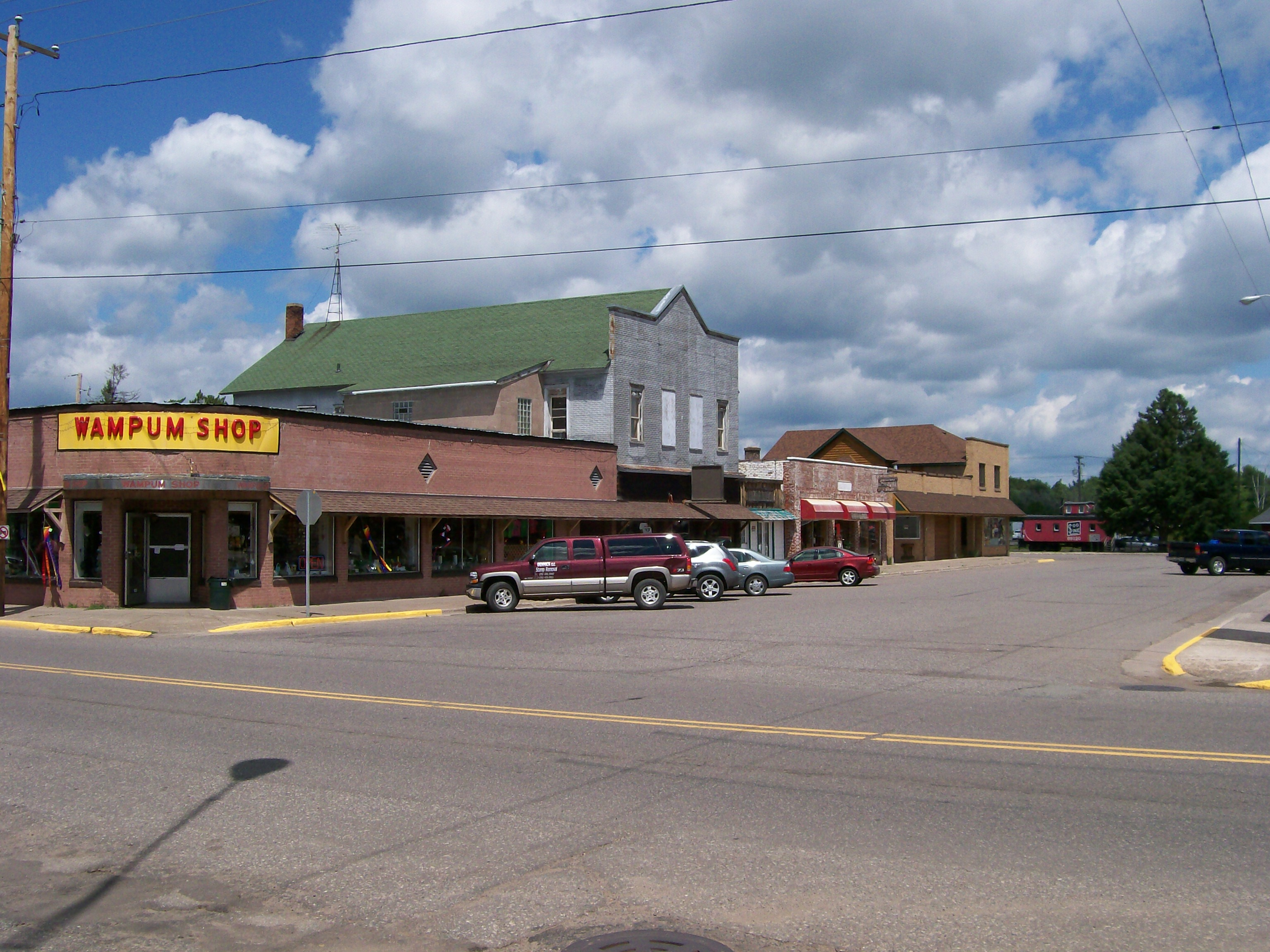
Mercer's central district. The tourist store Wampum Shop is on the left, with the Historical Society in the background

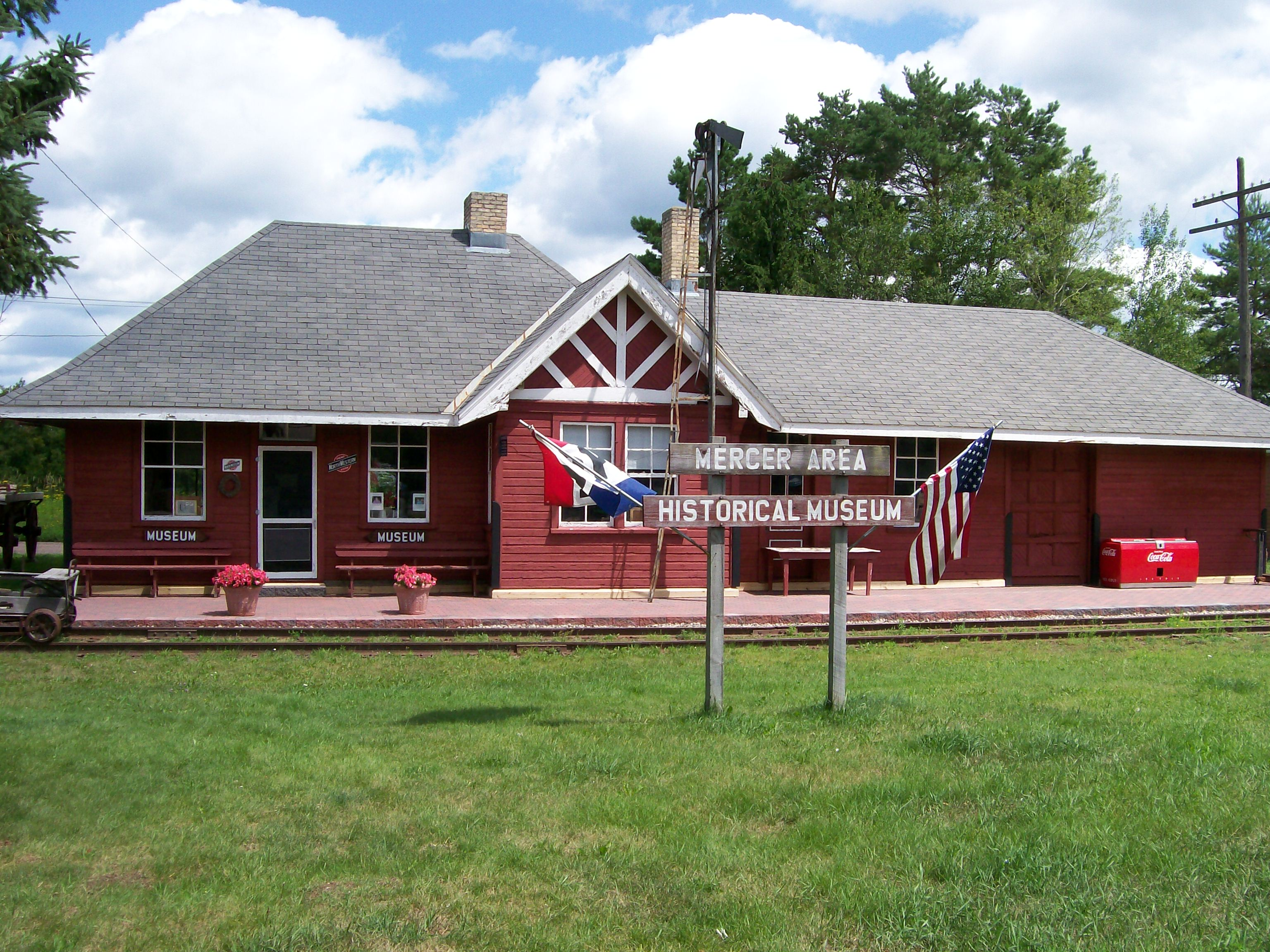
The Historical Society, housed in the former train depot in the CDP

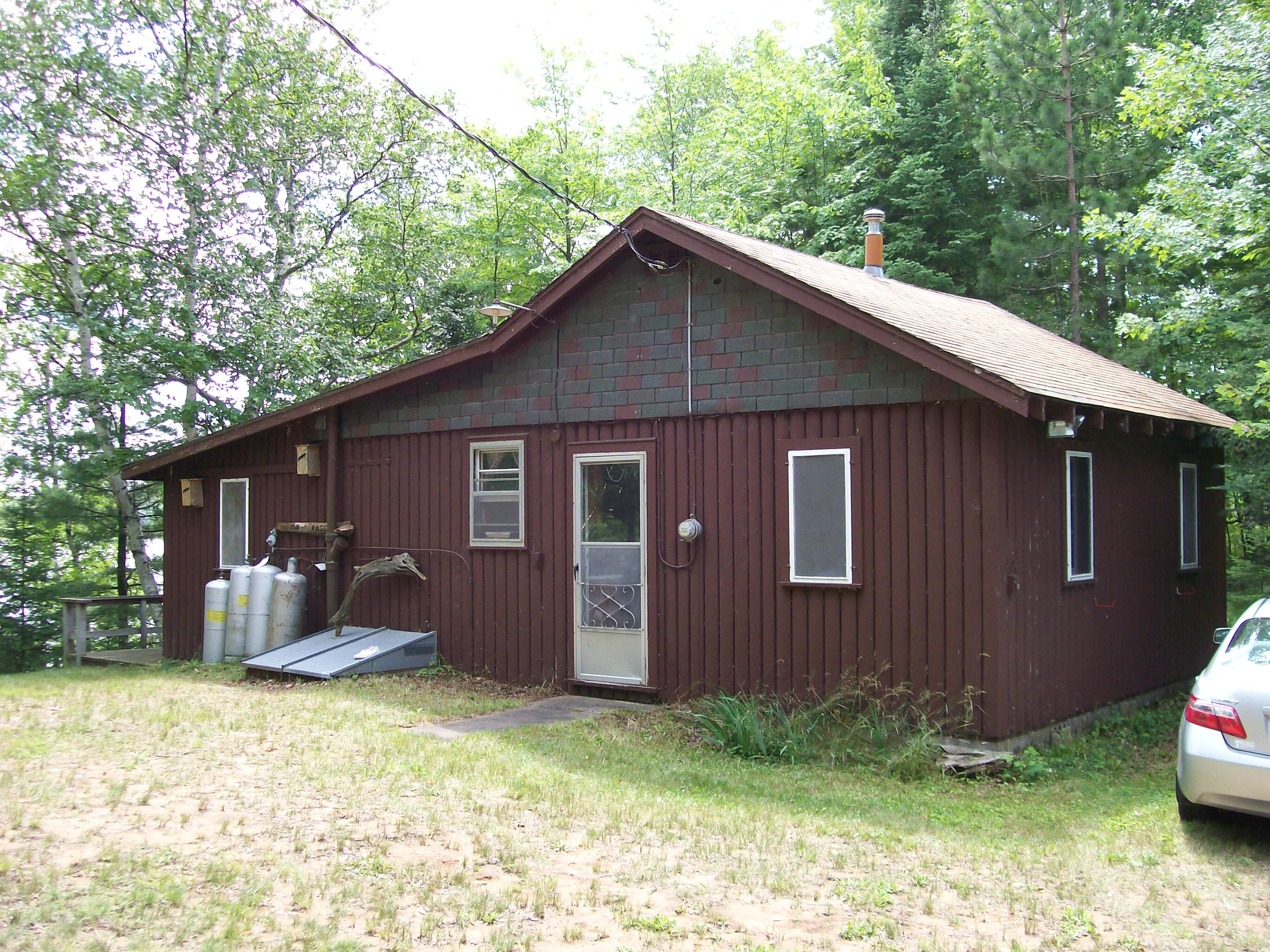
A typical Northwoods cabin in the Mercer area

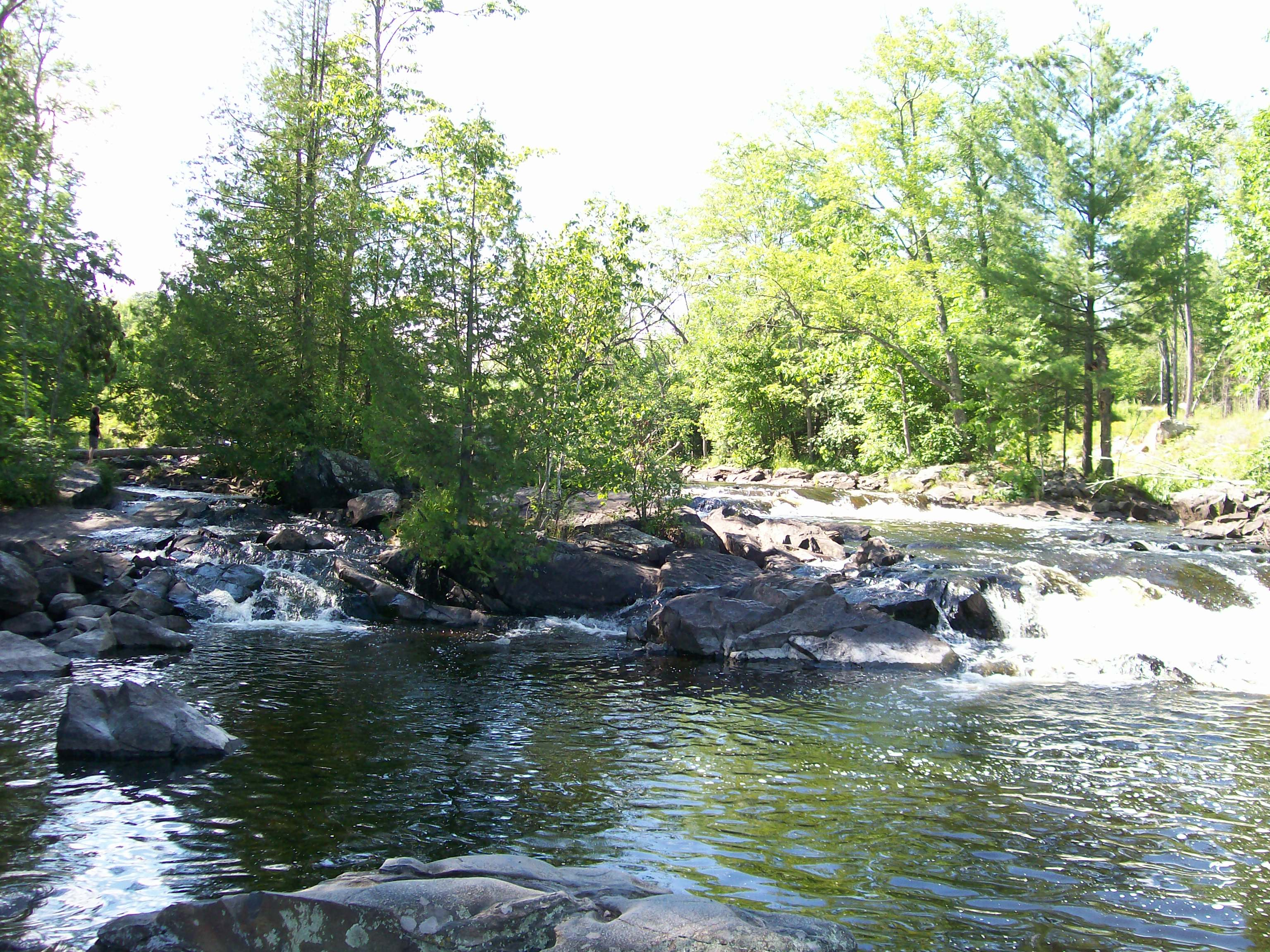
The Lake of the Falls park contains a beach and campgrounds

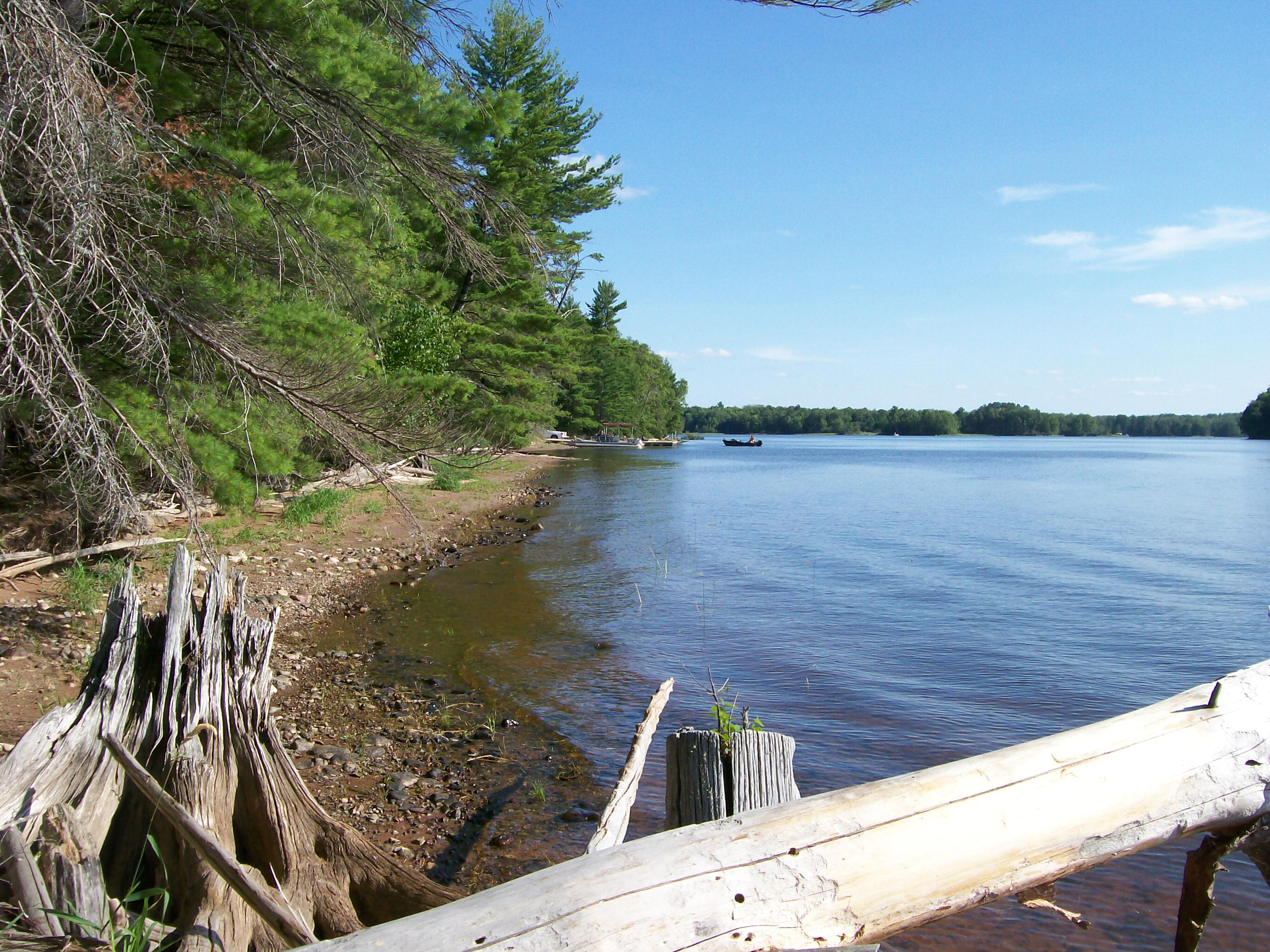
Fishermen departing from a public boat access point on the Flowage
