= Wisconsin Highway 81 =

Highway in Wisconsin

State Trunk Highway 81
- WIS 81 highlighted in red

Route information
- Maintained by WisDOT
- Length: 123.81 mi (199.25 km)

Major junctions
- West end: WIS 133 in Cassville
- US 61 / WIS 35 in Lancaster; US 151 in Platteville; US 51 in Beloit; I-39 / I-90 in Beloit
- East end: I-43 in Beloit

Location
- Country: United States
- State: Wisconsin
- Counties: Grant, Lafayette, Green, Rock

Highway system
- Wisconsin State Trunk Highway System; Interstate; US; State; Scenic; Rustic
| ← WIS 80 | → WIS 82 |

State Trunk Highway 81 (often called Highway 81, STH-81 or WIS 81) is a state highway in the U.S. state of Wisconsin. It runs east–west in southwest and south central Wisconsin from Cassville to Beloit. Between Brodhead and Monroe it run concurrently with WIS 11 for 13 miles (21 km). The route was originally designated as a state highway in the early 1920s, but there were three different designations along the route. It was not signed as WIS 81 along the entire route until 1934.

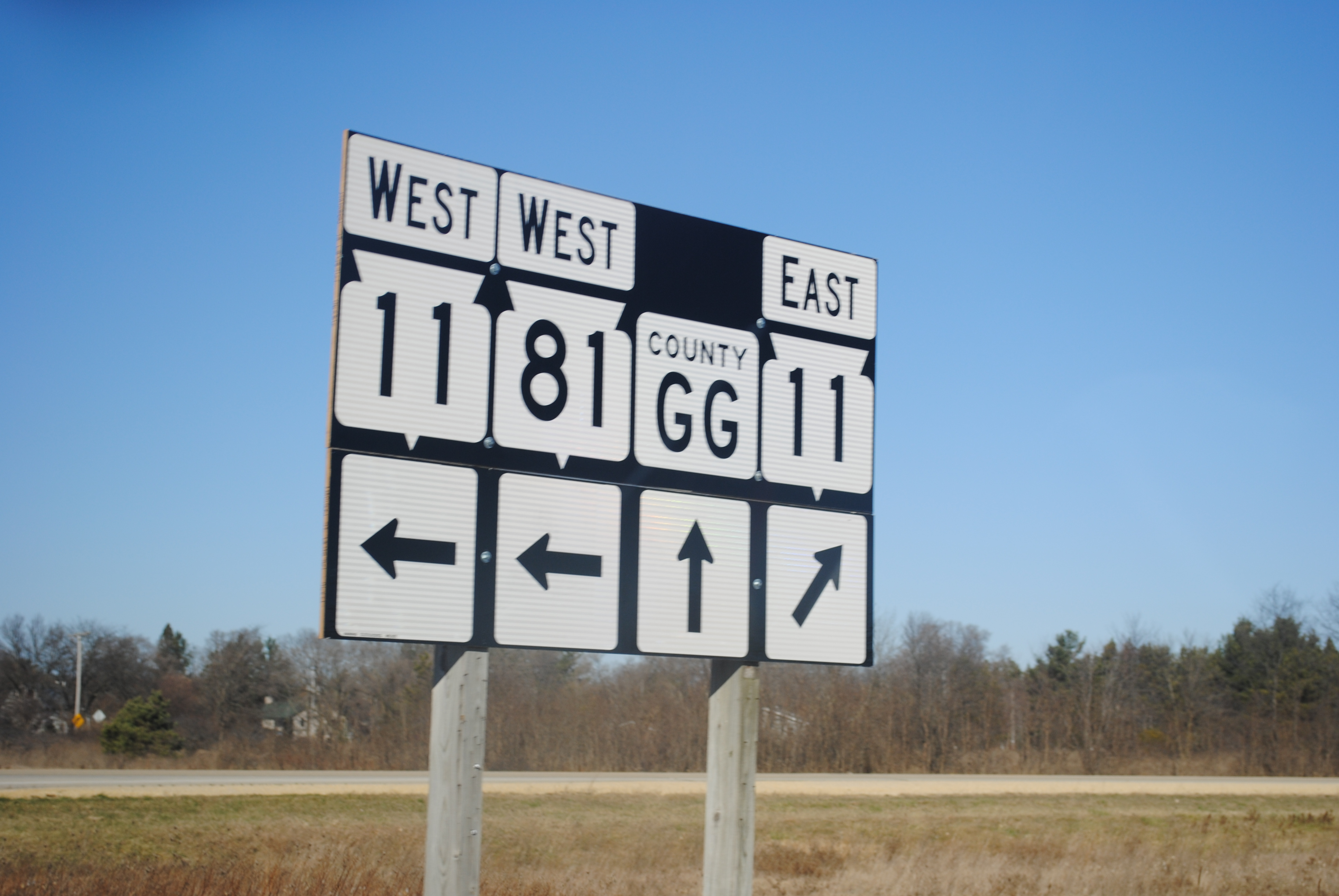
Junction at Brodhead with WIS 11 and CTH-GG

== Route description ==
The highway begins at an intersection with WIS 133 in Cassville, a village along the Mississippi River bordering Iowa, and runs northeastward from it. It intersects County Trunk Highway U (CTH-U) in Beetown and then runs concurrently with WIS 33 along the Grant River west of Five Points. From there, it continues running northeast, intersecting with CTH-N before reaching Lancaster, where it starts running concurrently with US Highway 61 (US 61). It then runs southeastward, meeting WIS 129, an eastern bypass of Lancaster, before exiting its concurrencies with US 61 and WIS 33. From there. it continues running southeast, passing the community of Ellenboro and running concurrently with CTH-D before entering Platteville along Lancaster Street. The highway then runs along a few of the streets in Platteville and ends its concurrency with CTH-D before starting another concurrency with WIS 80.

The highway runs southeasterly along the WIS 80 concurrency, intersecting with Business US 151 (Bus. US 151) before passing through an interchange with US 151. It then curves to the south, passing by Platteville Municipal Airport before exiting its concurrency with WIS 80 and running east from it. The highway runs directly eastward, passing by Elk Grove and intersecting with WIS 126 and numerous county trunk highways before running along a short concurrency with WIS 23 in Darlington. From there, it runs along the Pecatonica River before it runs south of the highway, and the highway runs east, passing through the community of Lamont before running along a short concurrency with WIS 78 in Argyle.

East of Argyle, the highway runs southeasterly towards Monroe before running concurrently with WIS 11 along a bypass alignment just north of Monroe. The concurrency runs east, passing by Juda before the highway leaves the concurrency and runs southeast from it. The highway curves east in Newark before entering Beloit along Liberty Avenue. West of the Rock River, the highway follows a short concurrency with WIS 213. After crossing the Rock River, the highway intersects US 51 before running northeast from it and terminating at an interchange with Interstate 39/Interstate 90 (I-39/I-90) and continuing as I-43.

== History ==
The route first appeared as a state trunk highway in the early 1920s but was split into three differently designated segments: from Cassville to the beginning of the WIS 35 (then WIS 65) concurrency, it was WIS 105; from the beginning of said concurrency to Monroe, it was part of WIS 65; and from the end of the WIS 11 (then WIS 20), it was part of WIS 61. In 1924, the entire route was signed as a western extension of WIS 61. In 1927, the highway, along with the rest of WIS 61, had been renumbered to WIS 14. In 1934, when US 14 was designated within the state, the entire route was renumbered to WIS 81. Between 1948 and 1956, the entire route within Grant County was paved. The sections which were not paved in 1956 were the entire route in Lafayette County, between the WIS 11 concurrency and Newark, and a short section along the WIS 11 concurrency near Juda.

In 2021, the eastern terminus of the highway was extended to I-43's exit 1 (CTH-X) and the interchange at I-39/90 was changed to a diverging diamond interchange. I-43 now terminates at a directional-T interchange at I-39/90, and the eastern terminus at I-43 is now a dumbbell interchange.

== Major junctions ==
| County | Location | mi | km | Destinations | Notes |
|---|---|---|---|---|---|
| Grant | Cassville | 0.0 | 0.0 | WIS 133 / Great River Road – Nelson Dewey State Park, Stonefield Historic Site | |
| Grant | Beetown | 11.6 | 18.7 | WIS 35 north – Prairie du Chien | Western end of WIS 35 concurrency |
| Grant | Lancaster | 18.8 | 30.3 | US 61 north (Madison Street) | Northern end of US 61 concurrency |
| Grant | South Lancaster | 20.8 | 33.5 | Truck US 61 north / WIS 129 north – Fennimore | |
| Grant | South Lancaster | 21.6 | 34.8 | US 61 south / WIS 35 south – Dickeyville, Dubuque | Southern end of US 61/WIS 35 concurrency |
| Grant | Platteville | 34.8 | 56.0 | WIS 80 north – Livingston, Montfort | Northern end of WIS 80 concurrency |
| Grant | Platteville–Platteville (town) line | 36.5 | 58.7 | US 151 – Madison, Dubuque | Interchange |
| Grant | Smelser | 40.2 | 64.7 | WIS 80 south – Cuba City, Hazel Green | Southern end of WIS 80 concurrency |
| Lafayette | Elk Grove | 45.6 | 73.4 | WIS 126 north – Belmont | |
| Lafayette | Darlington–Darlington (town) line | 55.8 | 89.8 | WIS 23 south – Shullsburg | Southern end of WIS 23 concurrency |
| Lafayette | Darlington | 56.9 | 91.6 | WIS 23 north (Main Street) | Northern end of WIS 23 concurrency |
| Lafayette | Argyle | 71.7 | 115.4 | WIS 78 south – Gratiot | Western end of WIS 78 concurrency |
| Lafayette | Argyle | 72.1 | 116.0 | WIS 78 north – Blanchardville | Eastern end of WIS 78 concurrency |
| Green | Town of Monroe | 85.7 | 137.9 | WIS 11 west / WIS 69 south – Dubuque, Freeport | Western end of WIS 11/WIS 69 concurrency; interchange |
| Green | Town of Monroe | 86.6 | 139.4 | WIS 69 north / Bus. WIS 11 – Verona | Eastern end of WIS 69 concurrency; interchange |
| Green | Monroe (town)–Monroe line | 87.7 | 141.1 | WIS 59 east – Albany | Interchange |
| Green | Spring Grove | 99.5 | 160.1 | WIS 11 east / CTH-GG north – Brodhead | Eastern end of WIS 11 concurrency |
| Rock | Beloit | 118.5 | 190.7 | WIS 213 north – Orfordville | Western end of WIS 213 concurrency |
| Rock | Beloit | 119.7 | 192.6 | WIS 213 south (4th Street) | Eastern end of WIS 213 concurrency |
| Rock | Beloit | 120.0 | 193.1 | US 51 (Riverside Drive, Pleasant Street) | |
| Rock | Beloit | 123.1 | 198.1 | I-39 / I-90 / Alt. I-43 – Madison, Chicago | I-39/I-90 exit 185; diverging diamond interchange |
| Rock | Turtle | 124.8 | 200.8 | CTH-X east | Western end of CTH-X concurrency |
| Rock | Turtle | 125.1 | 201.3 | I-43 / Alt. I-39 / CTH-X east / Hart Road – Milwaukee, Beloit | I-43 exits 0A-B southbound; tri-stack interchange. |
1.000 mi = 1.609 km; 1.000 km = 0.621 mi: Concurrency terminus
