= Manitowish, Wisconsin =

- Unincorporated community
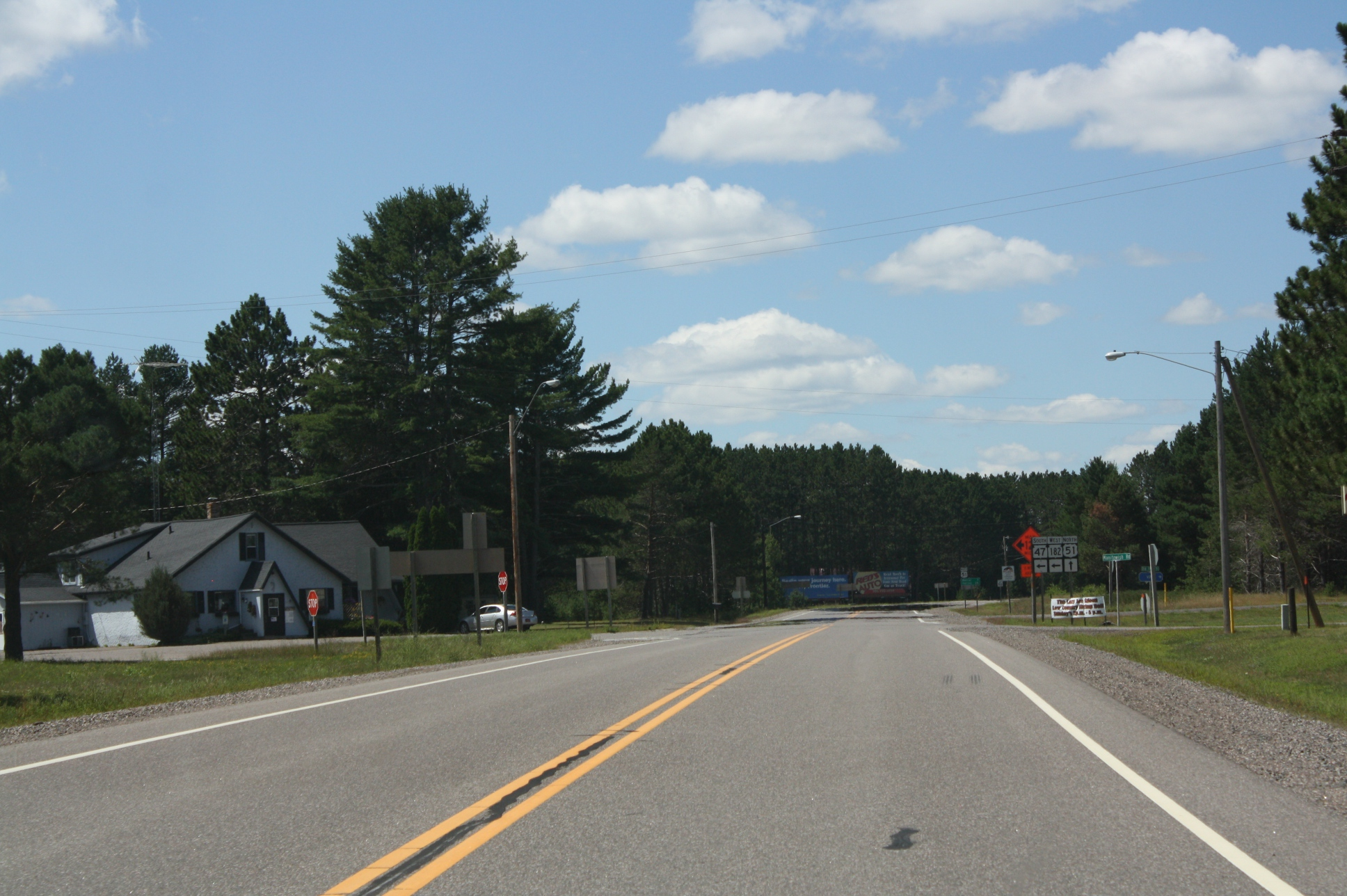
- Intersection of US 51 and WIS 47/WIS 182, August 2012

- Location within Wisconsin Location within the United States
- Coordinates: 46°07′59″N 90°00′49″W
- Country: United States
- State: Wisconsin
- County: Iron
- Town: Mercer
- Elevation: 1,591 ft (485 m)
- Time zone: UTC-6 (Central (CST))
  - Summer (DST): UTC-5 (CDT)
- Area codes: 715 & 534
- GNIS feature ID: 1568939

Manitowish is an unincorporated community located within the town of Mercer, Iron County, Wisconsin, United States. It is situated at the junction of U.S. Route 51, Wisconsin Highway 47 and Wisconsin Highway 182.

== History ==
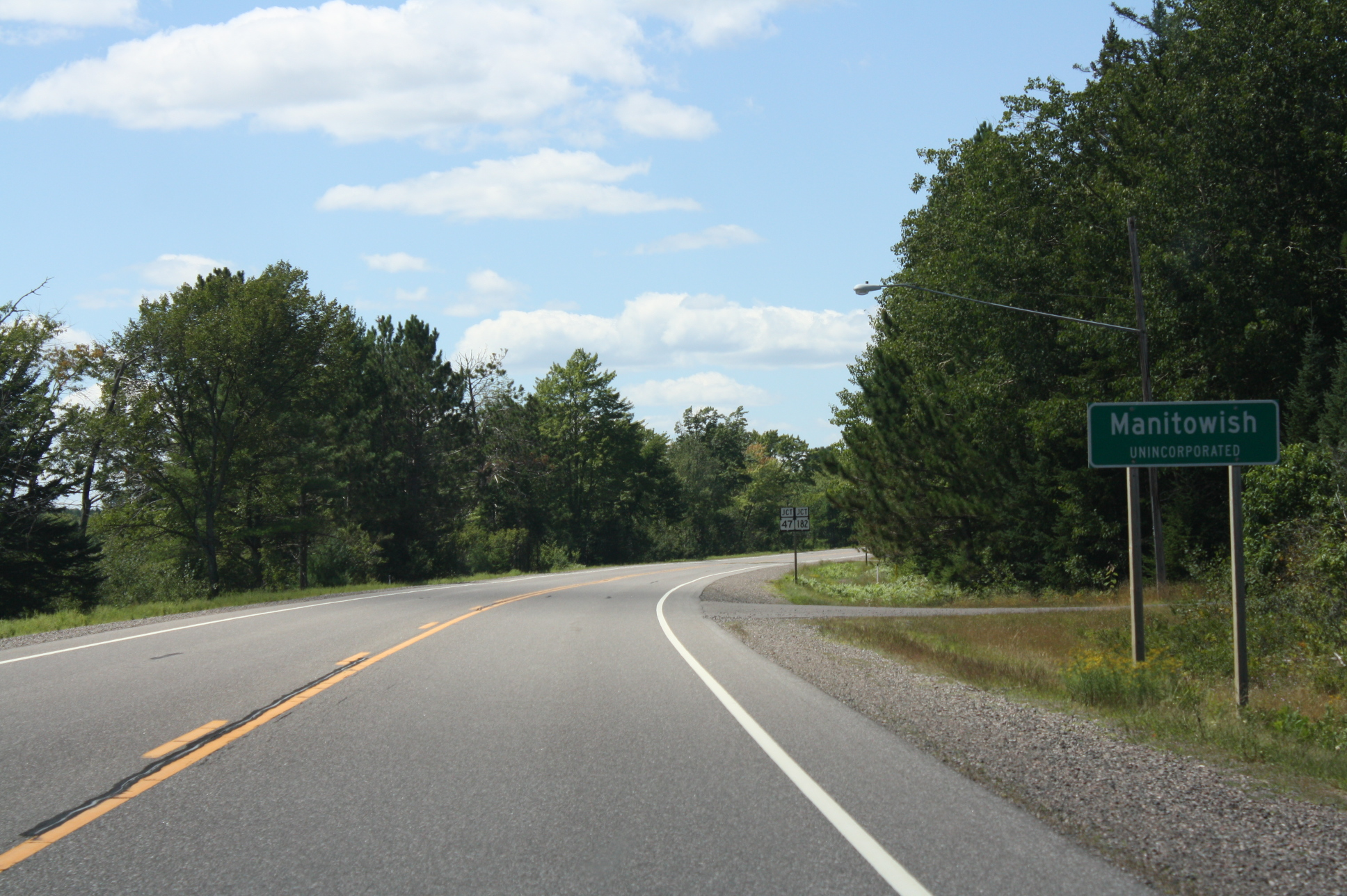
Sign for Manitowish on US 51, August 2012

A post office called Manitowish was established in 1890, and remained in operation until it was discontinued in 1968. The community took its name from the nearby Manitowish River.
