= Wisconsin Highway 47 =

State highway in Wisconsin, United States

State Trunk Highway 47
- WIS 47 highlighted in red

Route information
- Maintained by WisDOT
- Length: 188.01 mi (302.57 km)

Major junctions
- South end: WIS 114 in Menasha
- US 10 / WIS 441 in Menasha; I-41 / US 41 in Grand Chute; US 45 / WIS 52 in Antigo; US 8 / US 45 in Monico; US 8 in Rhinelander; US 51 / WIS 70 in Woodruff
- North end: US 51 / WIS 182 in Manitowish

Location
- Country: United States
- State: Wisconsin
- Counties: Winnebago, Outagamie, Shawano, Menominee, Langlade, Oneida, Vilas, Iron

Highway system
- Wisconsin State Trunk Highway System; Interstate; US; State; Scenic; Rustic
| ← WIS 46 | → WIS 48 |

State Trunk Highway 47 (often called Highway 47, STH-47 or WIS 47) is a 188.01-mile (302.57 km) state highway in the northeastern and northern parts of the US state of Wisconsin that runs in a diagonal northwest–southeast from Menasha to Manitowish.

== Route description ==
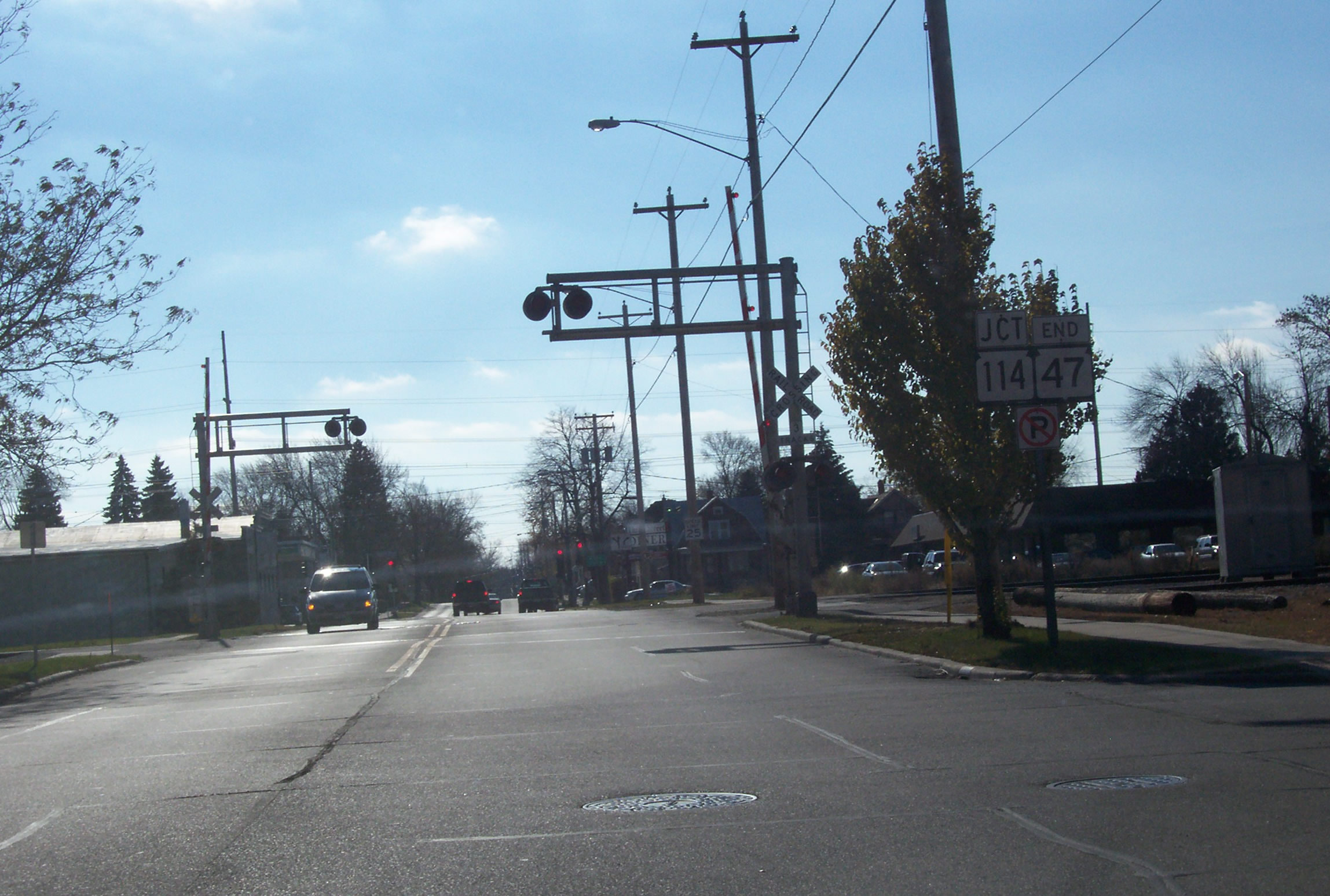
Looking south at the southern terminus of WIS 47

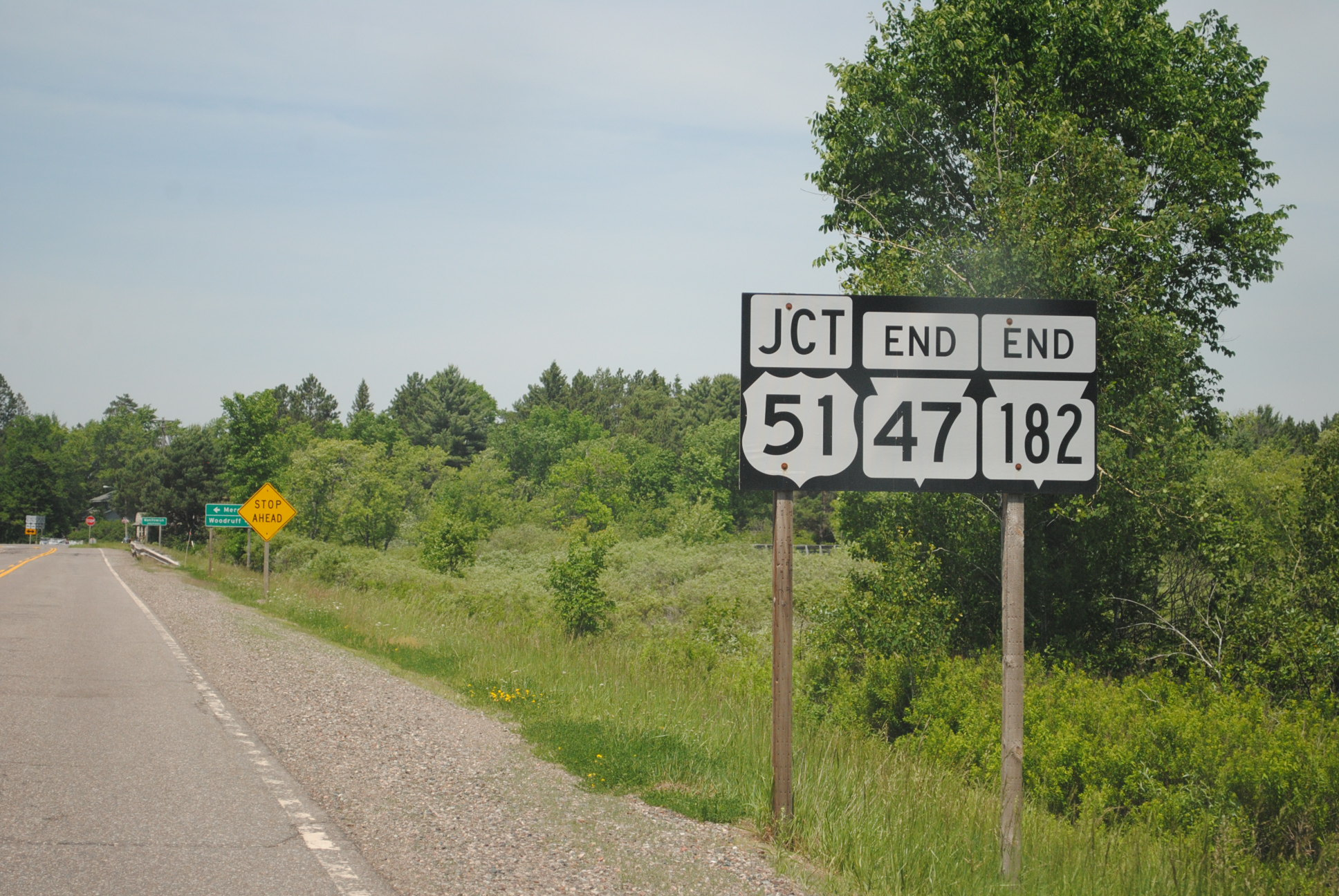
The northern terminus (along with Wisconsin Highway 182) in Mantowish, June 2012

The southern terminus of WIS 47 is at WIS 114 at the corner of Third and De Pere streets in Menasha.

Of the 188-mile (303 km) route, about 76 miles (122 km) are cosigned with other highways. From south to north, WIS 47 is aligned with WIS 29 from south of Bonduel to south of Shawano, WIS 55 from south of Bonduel to Keshena. After a solo segment, WIS 47 follows US Highway 45 (US 45) from south of Antigo to Monico and US 8 from Monico to Rhinelander.

The northern terminus of WIS 47 is a combined terminus with WIS 182 at US 51 in Manitowish.

== History ==
At its inception, WIS 47 ran from WIS 15 in Appleton to WIS 29 in Bonduel. In 1919, the highway was expanded north to Antigo, where it ended at US 45. In 1925, it was extended along US 45 to Woodruff. In 1937, it was extended along the old US 41 to Menasha. In 1952, it was extended north to Manitowish. In 1997, freeway was added with the WIS 29/WIS 55 bypass near Bonduel.

== Major intersections ==
| County | Location | mi | km | Destinations | Notes |
|---|---|---|---|---|---|
| Winnebago | Menasha | 0.0 | 0.0 | WIS 114 (3rd Street) – Neenah, Hilbert | |
| Winnebago | Menasha | 2.3 | 3.7 | US 10 / WIS 441 – Stevens Point, Green Bay | |
| Outagamie | Appleton | 4.4 | 7.1 | WIS 125 west (College Avenue) | Eastern terminus of WIS 125 |
| Outagamie | Appleton | 5.2 | 8.4 | WIS 96 (Wisconsin Avenue) | |
| Outagamie | Appleton | 7.0 | 11.3 | I-41 / US 41 – Oshkosh, Green Bay | |
| Outagamie | Black Creek | 20.1 | 32.3 | WIS 54 – Shiocton, Seymour | |
| Shawano | Town of Lessor | 28.9 | 46.5 | WIS 156 east – Briarton, Green Bay | Southern end of WIS 156 concurrency |
| Shawano | Town of Lessor | 29.4 | 47.3 | WIS 156 west – Navarino, Clintonville | Northern end of WIS 156 concurrency |
| Shawano | Bonduel | 37.4 | 60.2 | WIS 29 east / WIS 55 south / WIS 117 north – Bonduel, Green Bay | Eastern end of WIS 29 concurrency; southern end of WIS 55 concurrency; southern terminus of WIS 117 |
| Shawano | Shawano | 44.1 | 71.0 | WIS 29 west – Wausau | Western end of WIS 29 concurrency |
| Shawano | Shawano | 46.0 | 74.0 | WIS 22 north – Cecil | Eastern end of WIS 22 concurrency |
| Shawano | Shawano | 48.0 | 77.2 | WIS 22 south – Clintonville | Western end of WIS 22 concurrency |
| Menominee | Keshena | 56.4 | 90.8 | WIS 55 north – Crandon | Northern end of WIS 55 concurrency |
| Shawano | No major junctions | | | | |
| Menominee | No major junctions | | | | |
| Langlade | Town of Rolling | 86.3 | 138.9 | US 45 south / WIS 52 west – Wittenberg, Wausau | Southern end of US 45 concurrency; western end of WIS 52 concurrency |
| Langlade | Antigo | 93.7 | 150.8 | WIS 52 east / WIS 64 – Merrill, Langlade | Eastern end of WIS 52 concurrency |
| Oneida | Monico | 124.0 | 199.6 | US 8 east / US 45 north – Crandon, Eagle River | Eastern end of US 8 concurrency; northern end of US 45 concurrency |
| Oneida | Rhinelander | 135.1 | 217.4 | WIS 17 north – Eagle River | Northern end of WIS 17 concurrency |
| Oneida | Rhinelander | 137.8 | 221.8 | WIS 17 south – Merrill | Southern end of WIS 17 concurrency |
| Oneida | Rhinelander | 138.2 | 222.4 | US 8 west – Prentice | Western end of US 8 concurrency |
| Oneida | Woodruff | 161.5 | 259.9 | US 51 / WIS 70 – Minocqua, Mercer | |
| Vilas | No major junctions | | | | |
| Iron | Town of Sherman | 184.2 | 296.4 | WIS 182 west – Springstead, Park Falls | Western end of WIS 182 concurrency |
| Iron | Manitowish | 188.01 | 302.57 | US 51 / WIS 182 west – Mercer, Woodruff | Eastern terminus of WIS 182 |
1.000 mi = 1.609 km; 1.000 km = 0.621 mi: Concurrency terminus; Incomplete access
