= Wisconsin Highway 132 =

State highway in Wisconsin, United States

State Trunk Highway 132

Route information
- Existed: 1923–1992

Major junctions
- South end: CTH-J / CTH-JJ in Mount Hope
- North end: US 18 in Mount Hope

Location
- Country: United States
- State: Wisconsin
- Counties: Grant

Highway system
- Wisconsin State Trunk Highway System; Interstate; US; State; Scenic; Rustic
← WIS 131	→ WIS 133

State Trunk Highway 132 (often called Highway 132, STH-132 or WIS 132) was a state highway in the U.S. state of Wisconsin. The highway ran through Grant County.

== History ==
The highway number was designated in 1923, from WIS 11 (now US 61) in Boscobel to Mount Hope. In 1968, the section from US 61 to US 18 north of Mount Hope became part of WIS 133, leaving the highway as a short spur from US 18 to Mount Hope. The highway was decommissioned in 1993 and became part of County Highway J.

== Major intersections ==
The entire route was in Mount Hope, Grant County.

mi	km	Destinations	Notes
		CTH-JJ (Main Street)	
		US 18 – Fennimore, Prairie du Chien	
1.000 mi = 1.609 km; 1.000 km = 0.621 mi
