= Wisconsin Highway 126 =

State highway in Wisconsin, United States

State Trunk Highway 126
- WIS 126 highlighted in red

Route information
- Maintained by WisDOT
- Length: 5.7 mi (9.2 km)

Major junctions
- South end: WIS 81 in Belmont
- North end: US 151 / CTH-G in Belmont

Location
- Country: United States
- State: Wisconsin
- Counties: Lafayette

Highway system
- Wisconsin State Trunk Highway System; Interstate; US; State; Scenic; Rustic
← WIS 125	→ WIS 127

State Trunk Highway 126 (often called Highway 126, STH-126 or WIS 126) is a 5.7-mile (9.2 km) state highway in the US state of Wisconsin. It runs from Wisconsin Highway 81 south of the village of Belmont north to U.S. Highway 151 at the village's northern border; the highway is located entirely within Lafayette County. Highway 126 is maintained by the Wisconsin Department of Transportation.

== Route description ==
WIS 126 begins at an intersection with WIS 81 in the Town of Elk Grove. From here, the highway heads north through farmland. It meets the western terminus of County Trunk Highway F (CTF-F) before continuing north toward Belmont. At the village's southern edge, the highway curves to the east, following CTH-G. The road turns north at a junction with CTH-XX and heads through a residential area of Belmont as Mound Avenue. It continues north through the village's downtown, crossing the Pecatonica State Trail and a creek. From here, WIS 126 heads to the northwest as 1st Capitol Avenue, where it terminates at exit 26 on US 151. The road continues northwest as CTH-G.

== Major intersections ==
The entire route is in Lafayette County.

Location	mi	km	Destinations	Notes
Town of Elk Grove	0.0	0.0	WIS 81 – Platteville, Darlington	Southern terminus
Belmont	5.7	9.2	US 151 – Madison, Dubuque	Northern terminus
1.000 mi = 1.609 km; 1.000 km = 0.621 mi
