= Wisconsin Highway 127 =

State highway in Wisconsin, United States

State Trunk Highway 127
- WIS 127 highlighted in red

Route information
- Maintained by WisDOT
- Length: 14.16 mi (22.79 km)

Major junctions
- West end: WIS 16 near Wisconsin Dells
- East end: I-39 / WIS 16 in Portage

Location
- Country: United States
- State: Wisconsin
- Counties: Columbia

Highway system
- Wisconsin State Trunk Highway System; Interstate; US; State; Scenic; Rustic
← WIS 126	→ WIS 128

State Trunk Highway 127 (often called Highway 127, STH-127 or WIS 127) is a 14.16-mile (22.79 km) state highway in the U.S. state of Wisconsin. It runs from WIS 16 near Wisconsin Dells east to Interstate 39 (I-39) and WIS 16 in Portage; the highway is located entirely within Columbia County. WIS 127 is maintained by the Wisconsin Department of Transportation (WisDOT).

== Route description ==
WIS 127 begins at a junction with WIS 16 and County Trunk Highway WD (CTH-WD) in the Town of Newport, southwest of Wisconsin Dells. From here, the highway heads east through farmland, crossing CTH-O. It enters the Town of Lewiston, passing to the south of Lake Corning. Past the lake, the route meets CTH-XX and CTH-AA in succession before turning southeast; the latter route connects WIS 127 to Briggsville. WIS 127 crosses a creek before turning east to pass Lewiston Elementary School. After crossing a second creek, the route again heads southeast toward Portage. The highway curves south to pass Columbia Correctional Institution, a maximum-security state prison, before entering Portage. In Portage, WIS 127 passes several businesses before terminating at a junction with WIS 16 and exit 89B on I-39.

== History ==
WIS 127 is located on a former alignment of US 16 (now WIS 16). It was removed from US 16 when the portion of the route from Wisconsin Dells to Portage was realigned on a more direct routing in 1948, bringing it closer to the Wisconsin River. The route then became portions of CTH-WD and CTH-AA before re-entering the Wisconsin State Trunk Highway System in 1956, when WIS 127 was established.

== Major intersections ==
The entire route is in Columbia County.

Location	mi	km	Destinations	Notes
Town of Newport	0.0	0.0	WIS 16	Western terminus
Portage	14.1	22.7	I-39 / WIS 16	Eastern terminus
1.000 mi = 1.609 km; 1.000 km = 0.621 mi
