= Wisconsin Highway 125 =

Highway in Wisconsin

State Trunk Highway 125
- College Avenue
- WIS-125 highlighted in red

Route information
- Maintained by WisDOT
- Length: 2.62 mi (4.22 km)

Major junctions
- West end: I-41 / US 41 in Grand Chute
- East end: WIS 47 in Appleton

Location
- Country: United States
- State: Wisconsin
- Counties: Outagamie

Highway system
- Wisconsin State Trunk Highway System; Interstate; US; State; Scenic; Rustic
← WIS 124	→ WIS 126

State Trunk Highway 125 (often called Highway 125, STH-125 or WIS 125) is a 2.62-mile (4.22 km) state highway in Outagamie County in the US state of Wisconsin. It runs from Interstate 41 (I-41) in the Town of Grand Chute east to WIS 47 in Appleton; the route is located entirely within these two municipalities. WIS 125 is maintained by the Wisconsin Department of Transportation (WisDOT).

== Route description ==
WIS 125 begins at a junction with I-41 and County Trunk Highway CA (CTF-CA) in the Town of Grand Chute. From here, the route heads east as a divided highway called College Avenue, passing through a business district. It meets CTF-AA (Bluemound Drive) before passing a baseball diamond. After entering Appleton, the highway meets CTF-A (Lynndale Drive). Past this junction, the route crosses the Canadian National Railway. The highway runs through a mixed residential and business area, passing to the south of Wilson Middle School. After crossing Badger Avenue, WIS 125 terminates at a junction with WIS 47; College Avenue continues east of the intersection. Valley Transit's Route 15 West College bus serves much of WIS 125, including the entire eastern half of the road.

== Major intersections ==
The entire route is in Outagamie County.

Location	mi	km	Destinations	Notes
Town of Grand Chute	0.0	0.0	I-41 / US 41 – Green Bay, Milwaukee CTH-CA west	Western terminus
Town of Grand Chute	0.27	0.43	CTH-AA	
Appleton	1	1.6	CTH-A	
Appleton	2.5	4.0	WIS 47 (Richmond Street, Memorial Drive)	Eastern terminus
1.000 mi = 1.609 km; 1.000 km = 0.621 mi
