= Wisconsin Highway 213 =

State highway in Wisconsin, United States

State Trunk Highway 213
- WIS 213 highlighted in red

Route information
- Maintained by WisDOT
- Length: 27.21 mi (43.79 km)

Major junctions
- South end: IL 2 in Beloit
- North end: US 14 / WIS 59 in Evansville

Location
- Country: United States
- State: Wisconsin
- Counties: Rock

Highway system
- Wisconsin State Trunk Highway System; Interstate; US; State; Scenic; Rustic
← WIS 195	→ WIS 241

State Trunk Highway 213 (often called Highway 213, STH-213 or WIS 213) is a state highway in the U.S. state of Wisconsin. It runs north–south in south central Wisconsin from Beloit to Evansville.

== History ==
WIS 213 was designated in 1961 for a segment formerly a part of WIS 13 south of Evansville when WIS 13 was truncated to end in the Wisconsin Dells area. Later in 1961, WIS 213 was extended southerly from its terminus at WIS 81 to end at WIS 15. In 1988, Interstate 43 (I-43) replaced WIS 15, and WIS 213 was extended to the state line.

== Major intersections ==
The entire route is in Rock County.

Location	mi	km	Destinations	Notes
Beloit	0.00	0.00	IL 2 south	Wisconsin–Illinois state line
Beloit	0.18	0.29	Broad Street (Spur US 51) to US 51	
Beloit	0.84	1.35	WIS 81 east (Portland Avenue)	Southern end of WIS 81 overlap
Beloit	2.03	3.27	WIS 81 west (E. Liberty Avenue)	Northern end of WIS 81 overlap
Orfordville	16.04	25.81	WIS 11 – Janesville, Monroe	
Town of Magnolia	24.13	38.83	WIS 59 south – Monroe	Southern end of WIS 59 overlap
Evansville	27.21	43.79	US 14 / WIS 59 – Janesville, Madison, Edgerton	Northern end of WIS 59 overlap
1.000 mi = 1.609 km; 1.000 km = 0.621 mi: Concurrency terminus
