= Wisconsin Highway 133 =

State highway in Wisconsin, United States

State Trunk Highway 133
- WIS 133 highlighted in red

Route information
- Maintained by WisDOT
- Length: 91.07 mi (146.56 km)

Major junctions
- South end: US 61 / WIS 35 in Potosi
- US 18 / WIS 35 in Patch Grove; US 18 in Mount Hope; US 61 in Boscobel
- North end: US 14 / WIS 60 / WIS 130 in Lone Rock

Location
- Country: United States
- State: Wisconsin
- Counties: Grant, Iowa, Richland

Highway system
- Wisconsin State Trunk Highway System; Interstate; US; State; Scenic; Rustic
← WIS 132	→ WIS 134

State Trunk Highway 133 (often called Highway 133, STH-133 or WIS 133) is a state highway in the U.S. state of Wisconsin. It runs in north–south in south central Wisconsin from near Tennyson to near Lone Rock.

== Route description ==
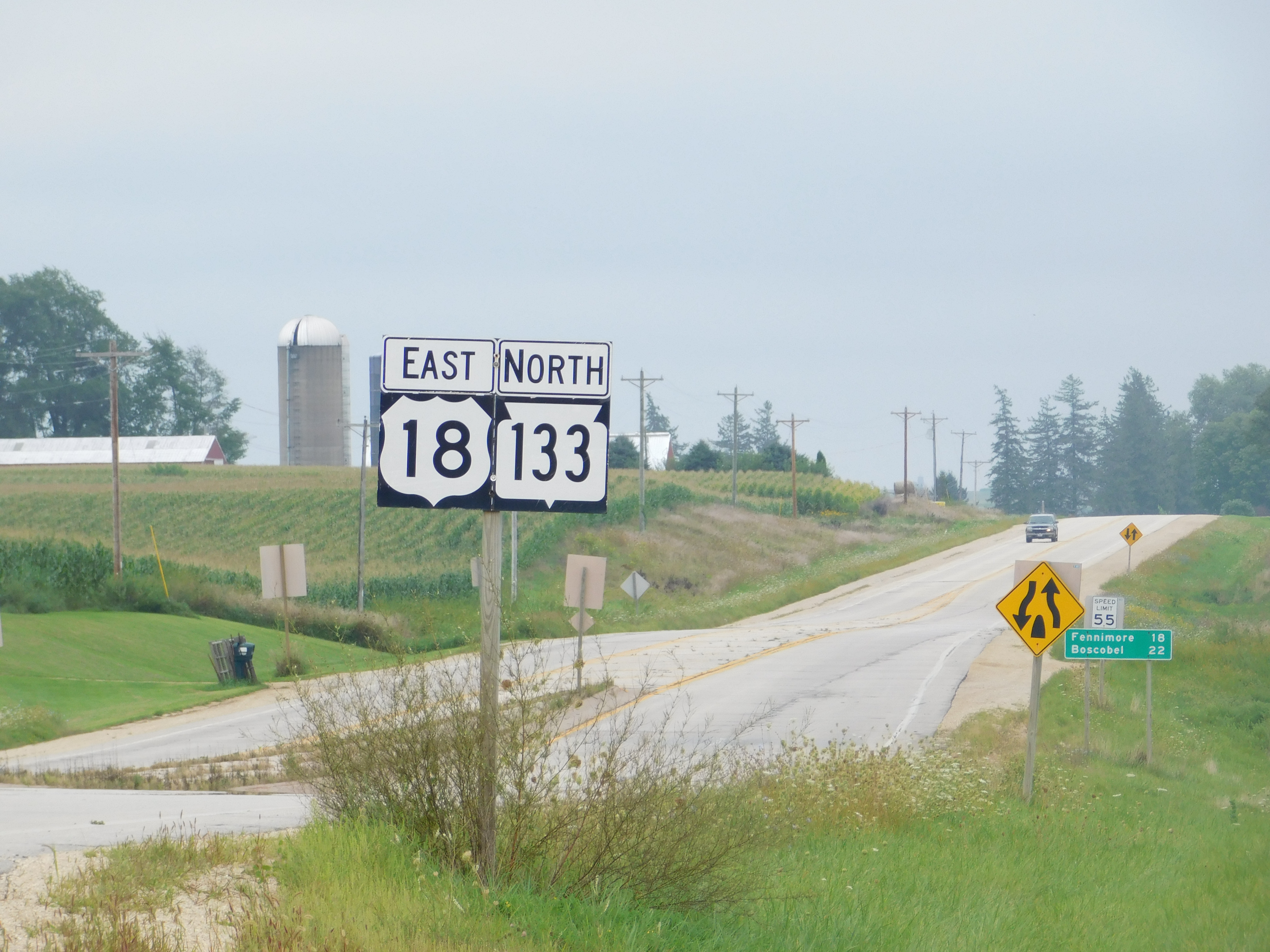
US 18/WIS 133 in Patch Grove

Starting at US 61/WIS 35 in Tennyson, WIS 133 begins to travel westward along with the Great River Road. After passing through Potosi, both WIS 133 and the Great River Road then traverses southwestward and then westward along the Mississippi River. In Cassville, they intersect WIS 81. They then turn northward after leaving Cassville, passing through North Andover. In Bloomington, they then meet WIS 35 again. This time, the two routes run along WIS 35 before intersecting US 18 north of Patch Grove. At this point, WIS 133 turns east away from WIS 35/GRR. At this point, WIS 133 travels east, running concurrently with US 18.

WIS 133 then branches northward away from US 18 at Mount Hope. After going through elevated terrain, WIS 133 turns northeastward as it meets the south bank of the Wisconsin River. At this point, the route parallels the river, passing through Woodman. In Boscobel, it then meets US 61 for the second time and then runs concurrently with it. It then turns east away from US 61. In Blue River, the route travels in an eastern direction. In Muscoda, it begins to run concurrently with WIS 80. Both briefly travel south before turning eastward again. Just west of Avoca, WIS 80 branches southward away from WIS 133. Then, WIS 133 turns north along WIS 130, crossing the Wisconsin River and going through Lone Rock before intersecting US 14. At this point, WIS 133 ends there while WIS 130 turns west along US 14. WIS 133 as a whole resembles a C-shaped route.

== Major intersections ==
County	Location	mi	km	Destinations	Notes
Grant	Tennyson	0.0	0.0	US 61 / WIS 35 / Great River Road south – Dickeyville, Lancaster; CTH-O	
Grant	Cassville	18.9	30.4	Wall Street to Cassville Ferry	
Grant	Cassville	19.0	30.6	WIS 81 east – Lancaster	
Grant	Bloomington	33.3	53.6	WIS 35 south – Lancaster	Southern end of WIS 35 overlap
Grant	Town of Patch Grove	38.7	62.3	US 18 west / WIS 35 north / Great River Road north – Prairie du Chien	Northern end of WIS 35 overlap; western end of US 18 overlap
Grant	Mount Hope	44.6	71.8	US 18 east – Fennimore	Eastern end of US 18 overlap
Grant	Boscobel	60.5	97.4	US 61 south – Fennimore	Western end of US 61 overlap
Grant	Boscobel	61.3	98.7	US 61 north – Viroqua	Eastern end of US 61 overlap
Grant	Muscoda	75.7	121.8	WIS 80 north – Richland Center	Western end of WIS 80 overlap
Iowa	Town of Pulaski	80.5	129.6	WIS 80 south – Cobb	Eastern end of WIS 80 overlap
Iowa	Town of Clyde	88.7	142.7	WIS 130 south – Dodgeville	Southern end of WIS 130 overlap
Richland	Lone Rock	90.8	146.1	US 14 / WIS 60 / WIS 130 north – Gotham, Bear Valley, Madison	Northern end of WIS 130 overlap
1.000 mi = 1.609 km; 1.000 km = 0.621 mi: Concurrency terminus
