= North Lancaster, Wisconsin =

- Town
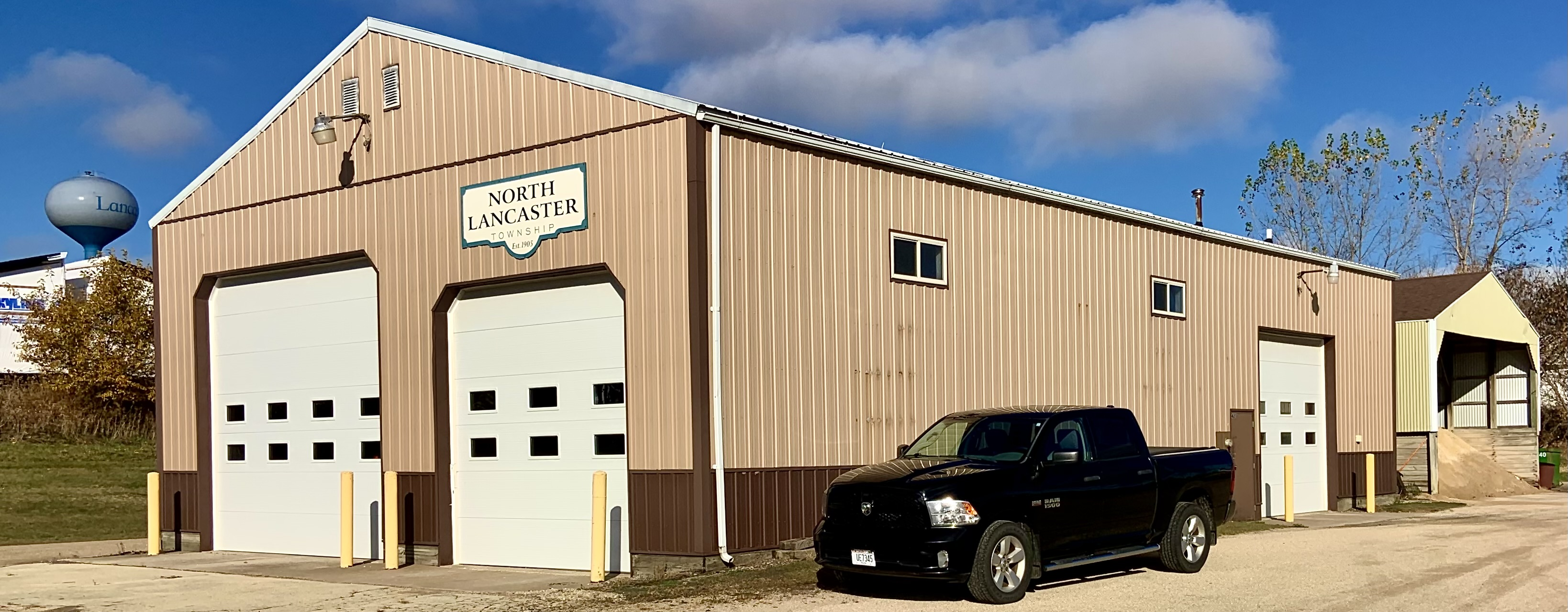
- Town hall

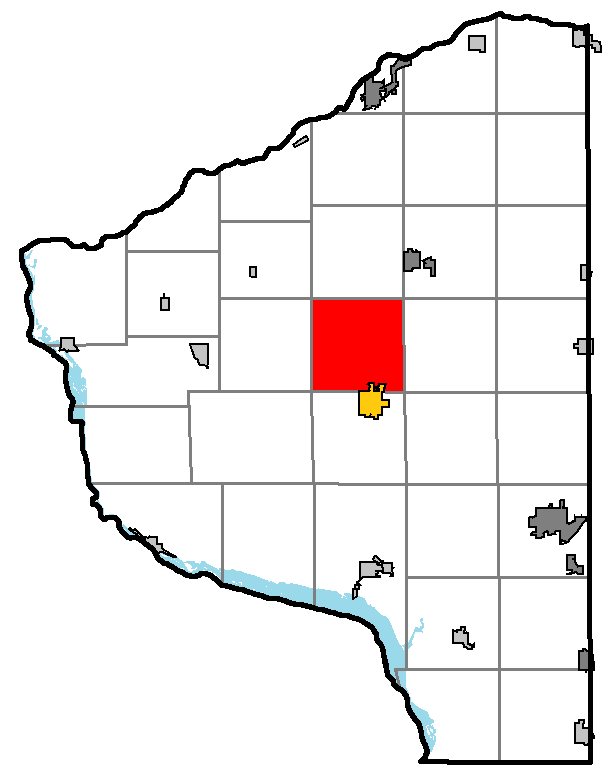
- Location of North Lancaster within Grant County, Wisconsin

- Location of Grant County, Wisconsin
- Coordinates: 42°54′2″N 90°43′13″W
- Country: United States
- State: Wisconsin
- County: Grant

Area
  - Total: 36.0 sq mi (93.3 km^{2})
  - Land: 36.0 sq mi (93.3 km^{2})
  - Water: 0 sq mi (0.0 km^{2})
- Elevation: 922 ft (281 m)

Population (2020)
  - Total: 581
  - Density: 16.1/sq mi (6.23/km^{2})
- Time zone: UTC-6 (Central (CST))
  - Summer (DST): UTC-5 (CDT)
- Area code: 608
- FIPS code: 55-58125
- GNIS feature ID: 1583830

North Lancaster is a town in Grant County, Wisconsin, United States. The population was 581 at the 2020 census.

== Geography ==
According to the United States Census Bureau, the town has a total area of 36.0 square miles (93.3 km^{2}), of which 36.0 square miles (93.3 km^{2}) is land and 0.03% is water.

== Demographics ==
At the 2000 census there were 515 people, 164 households, and 142 families living in the town. The population density was 14.3 people per square mile (5.5/km^{2}). There were 170 housing units at an average density of 4.7 per square mile (1.8/km^{2}). The racial makeup of the town was 99.03% White, 0.39% Asian, and 0.58% from two or more races. Hispanic or Latino of any race were 0.19%.

Of the 164 households 48.8% had children under the age of 18 living with them, 78.0% were married couples living together, 2.4% had a female householder with no husband present, and 13.4% were non-families. 10.4% of households were one person and 4.9% were one person aged 65 or older. The average household size was 3.14 and the average family size was 3.35.

The age distribution was 34.0% under the age of 18, 5.8% from 18 to 24, 28.2% from 25 to 44, 24.1% from 45 to 64, and 8.0% 65 or older. The median age was 37 years. For every 100 females, there were 111.1 males. For every 100 females age 18 and over, there were 108.6 males.

The median household income was $41,528 and the median family income was $43,750. Males had a median income of $27,361 versus $19,688 for females. The per capita income for the town was $17,038. About 7.9% of families and 10.6% of the population were below the poverty line, including 15.2% of those under age 18 and 5.3% of those age 65 or over.
