= Powell, Wisconsin =

- Unincorporated community
- Location within Wisconsin Location within the United States
- Coordinates: 46°05′19″N 89°57′31″W
- Country: United States
- State: Wisconsin
- County: Iron
- Town: Sherman
- Elevation: 1,594 ft (486 m)
- Time zone: UTC-6 (Central (CST))
  - Summer (DST): UTC-5 (CDT)
- Area codes: 715 & 534
- GNIS feature ID: 1571852

Powell is an unincorporated community located in the town of Sherman, Iron County, Wisconsin, United States. Powell is located near Wisconsin Highway 27, 27.5 miles (44.3 km) south-southeast of Hurley.

== History ==
A post office called Powell was established in 1908, and remained in operation until it was discontinued in 1942. The community was named for John Wesley Powell, an American geologist and explorer.
