= Mercer (CDP), Wisconsin =

Census-designated place in Wisconsin, United States

Mercer, Wisconsin
- Census-designated place
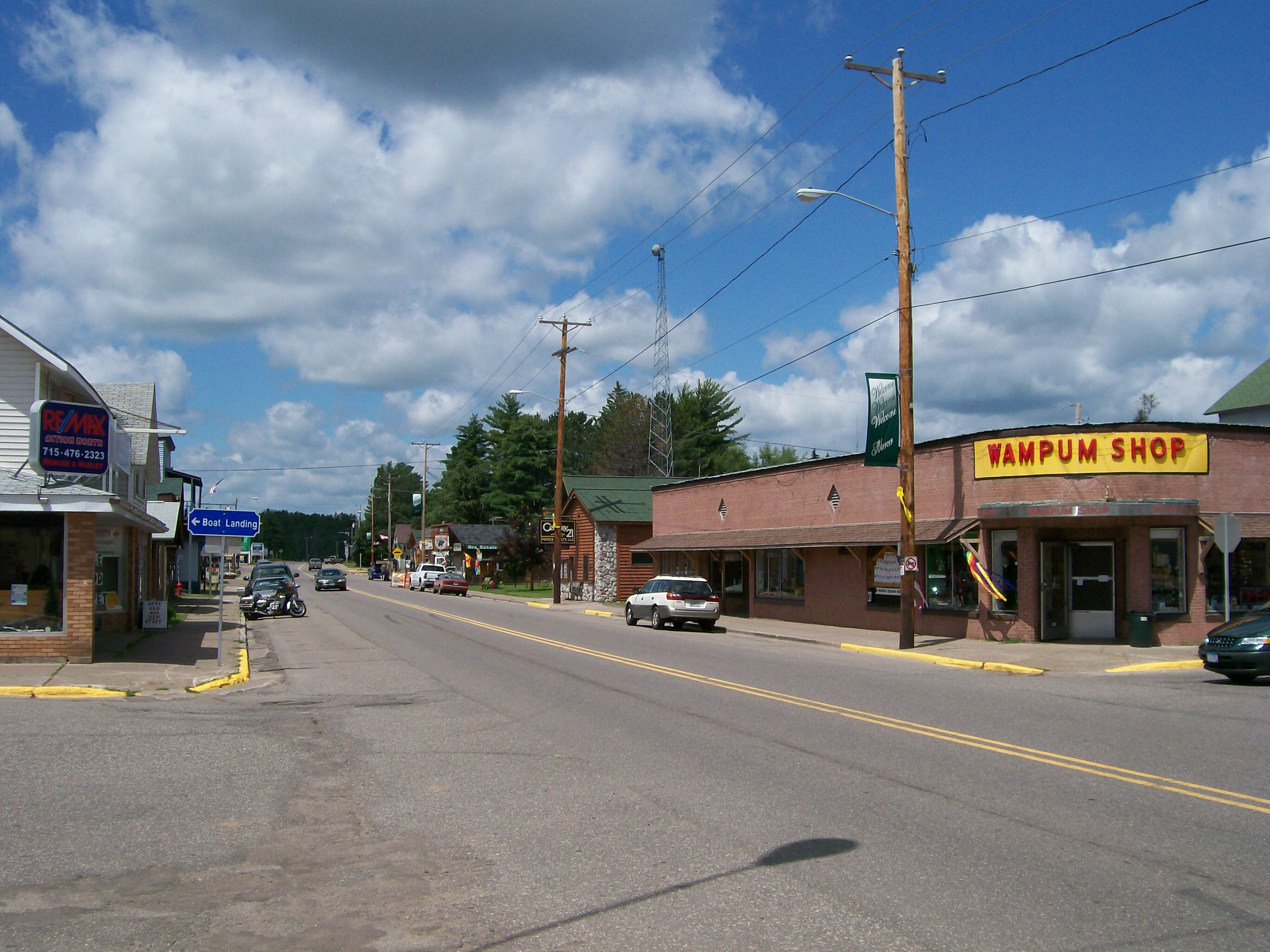
- Downtown Mercer

- Location in Iron County and the state of Wisconsin.
- Coordinates: 46°09′0″N 90°03′46″W
- Country: United States
- State: Wisconsin
- County: Iron
- Town: Mercer

Area
  - Total: 5.479 sq mi (14.19 km^{2})
  - Land: 4.452 sq mi (11.53 km^{2})
  - Water: 1.027 sq mi (2.66 km^{2})
- Elevation: 1,601 ft (488 m)

Population (2010)
  - Total: 516
  - Density: 116/sq mi (44.8/km^{2})
- Time zone: UTC-6 (Central (CST))
  - Summer (DST): UTC-5 (CDT)
- ZIP code: 54547
- Area codes: 715 & 534
- GNIS feature ID: 1569357

Mercer is an unincorporated census-designated place located in the town of Mercer, Iron County, Wisconsin, United States. Mercer is located on US Highway 51 (US 51), 20.5 miles (33.0 km) south-southeast of Hurley. Mercer has a post office with ZIP code 54547. As of the 2010 census, its population is 516.

Mercer identifies itself as the "Loon Capital of the World" in order to promote tourism. This is based on a wildlife study that found Mercer had the highest concentration of common loons in the world. In front of the Mercer Chamber of Commerce's information center, there is a 16-foot (4.9 m), 2,000-pound (910 kg) statue named "Claire de Loon." Mercer also hosts an annual "Loon Day" festival, which features a large arts and crafts fair, live music and a loon calling contest.

== History ==
A post office called Mercer has been in operation since 1895. The community was probably named for Hugh Mercer, a general in the American Revolutionary War.

== Tourism ==
Mercer's main industry is seasonal tourism, which is based on the large amount of undeveloped land and secluded waterways. Summer activities include boating, fishing, biking, hiking, and swimming. Summer tourism is often based on the Turtle-Flambeau Flowage and other bodies of water, such as Tank Lake (Grand Portage Lake), former home to weekly water ski shows and site of a public beach. Fishing and other water sports include water skiing and jet skiing. Autumn and winter recreation includes snowmobiling, skiing, and hunting.

Mercer is home to the Mercer Area Historical Society housed in the former train station; it contains a small museum of local history. Other buildings include a jail, schoolhouse, barbershop, and a reconstructed caboose.

== Images ==
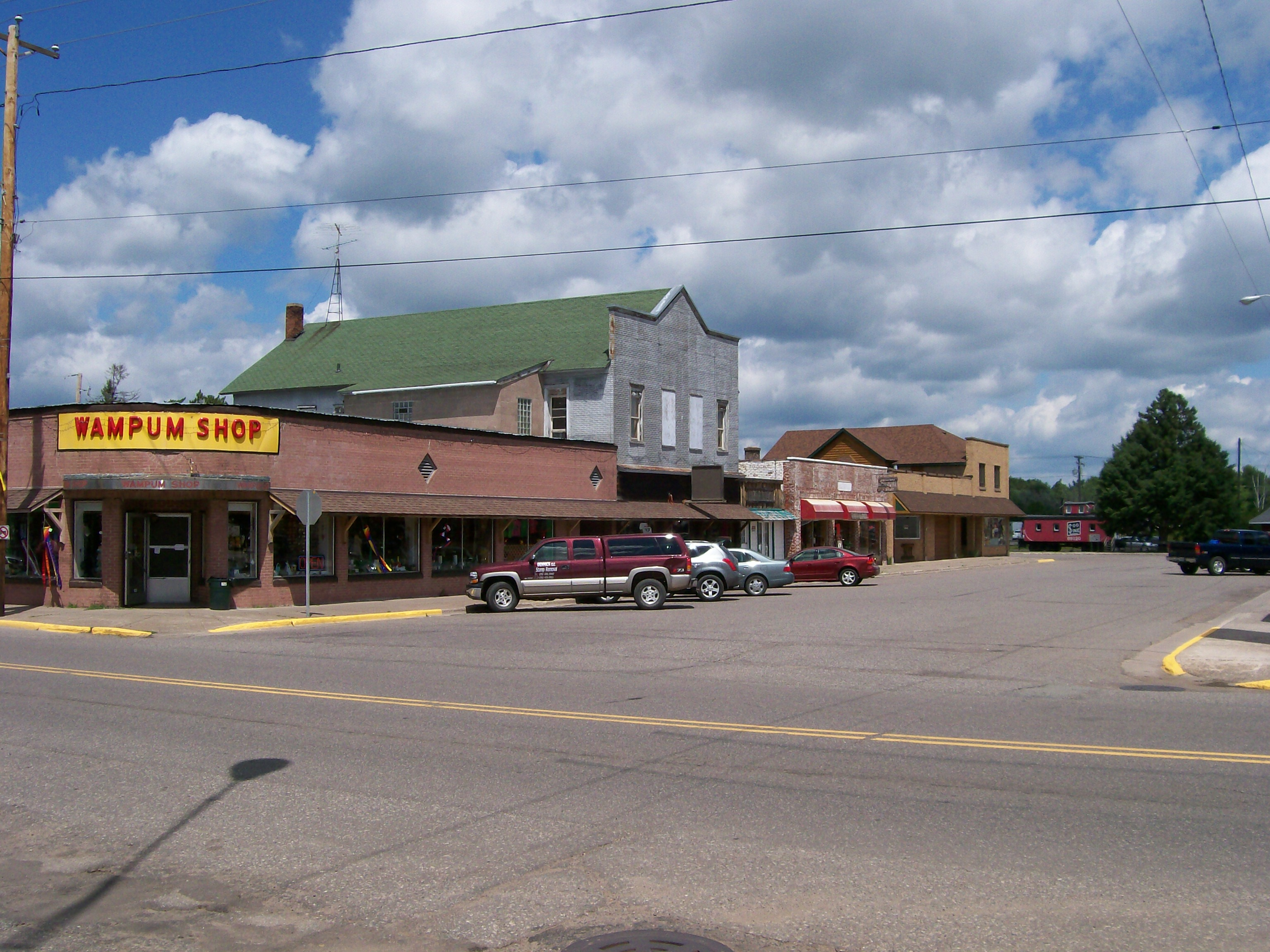
Mercer's central district. The tourist store Wampum Shop is on the left, with the Historical Society in the background

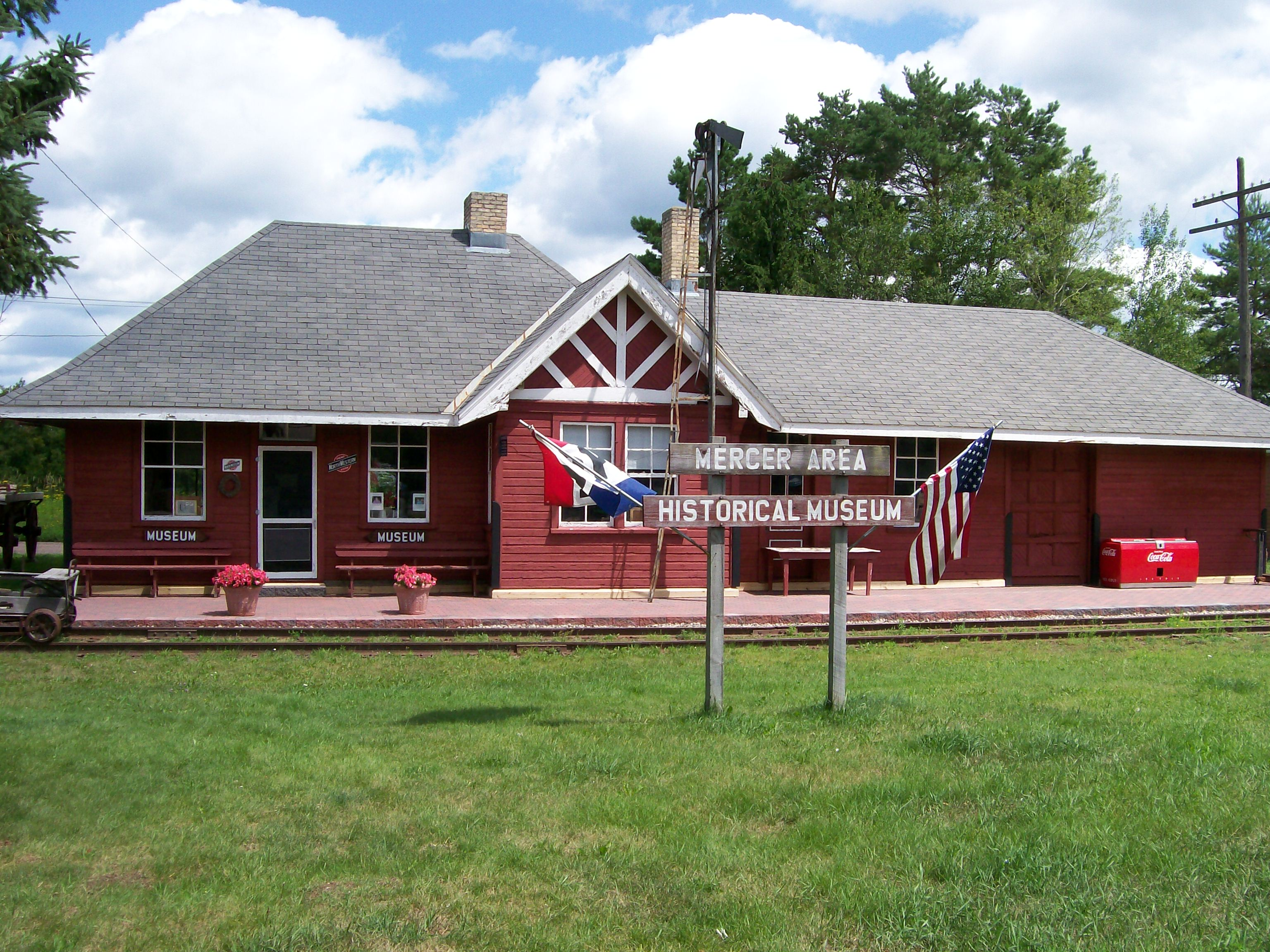
The Historical Society, housed in the former train depot

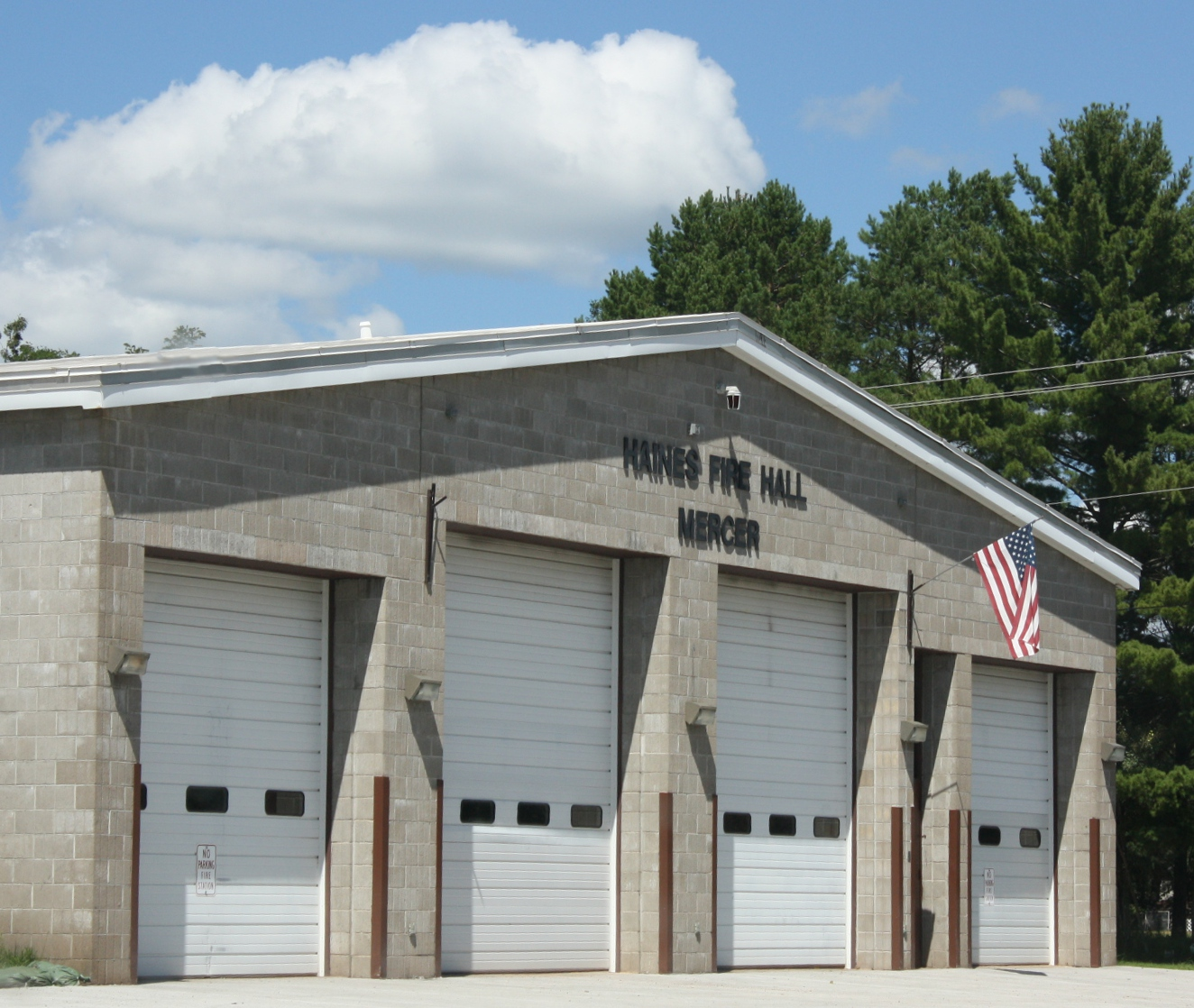
Haines Fire Hall

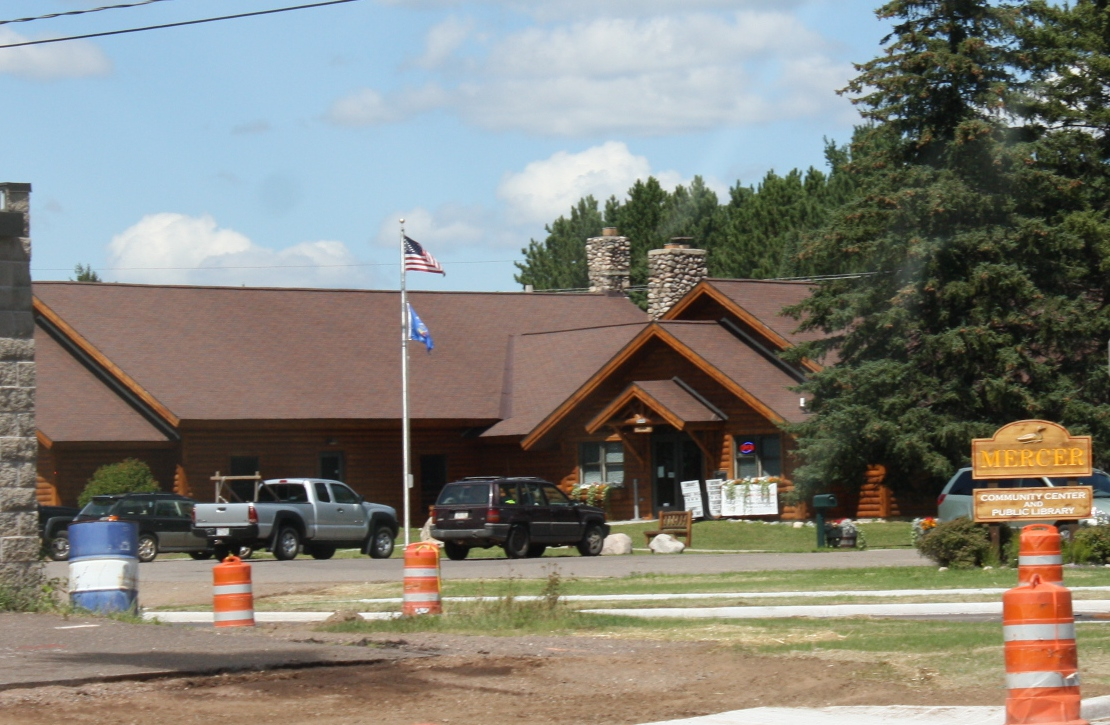
Community center / library

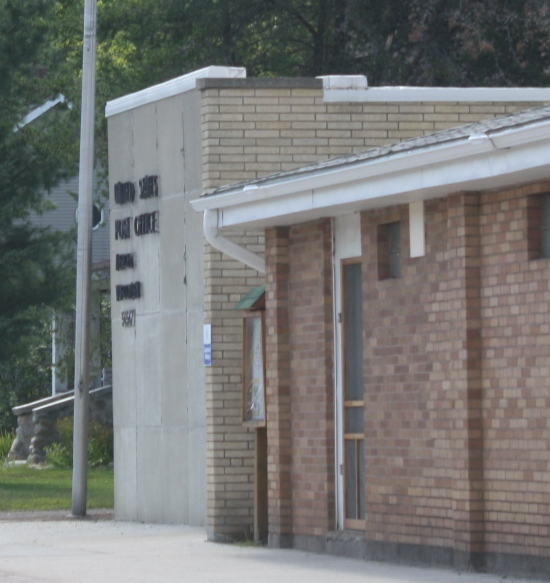
Post office

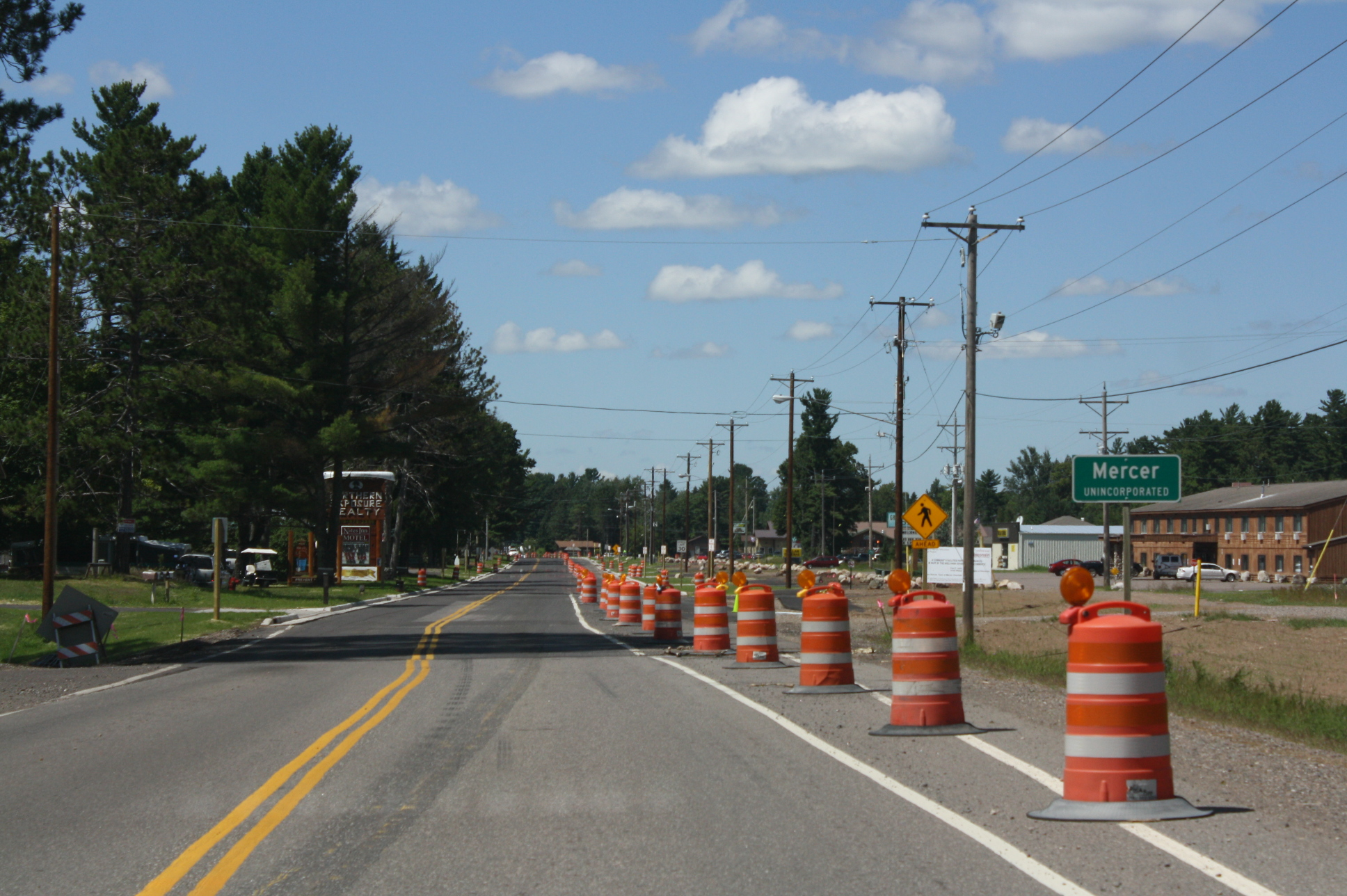
Sign on US 51

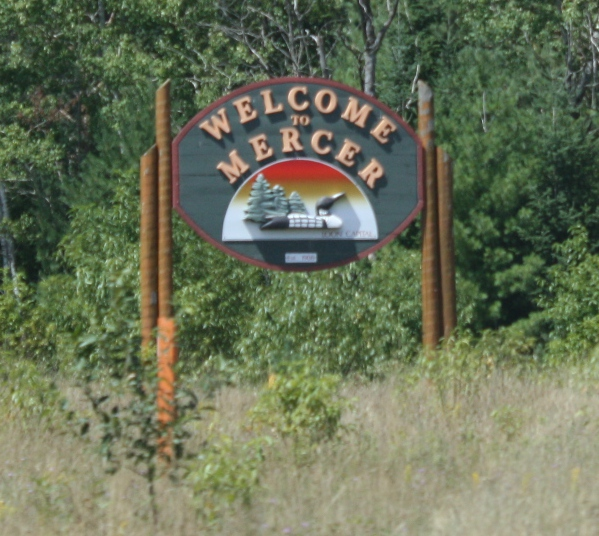
Welcome sign
