= Tennyson, Wisconsin =

- Village
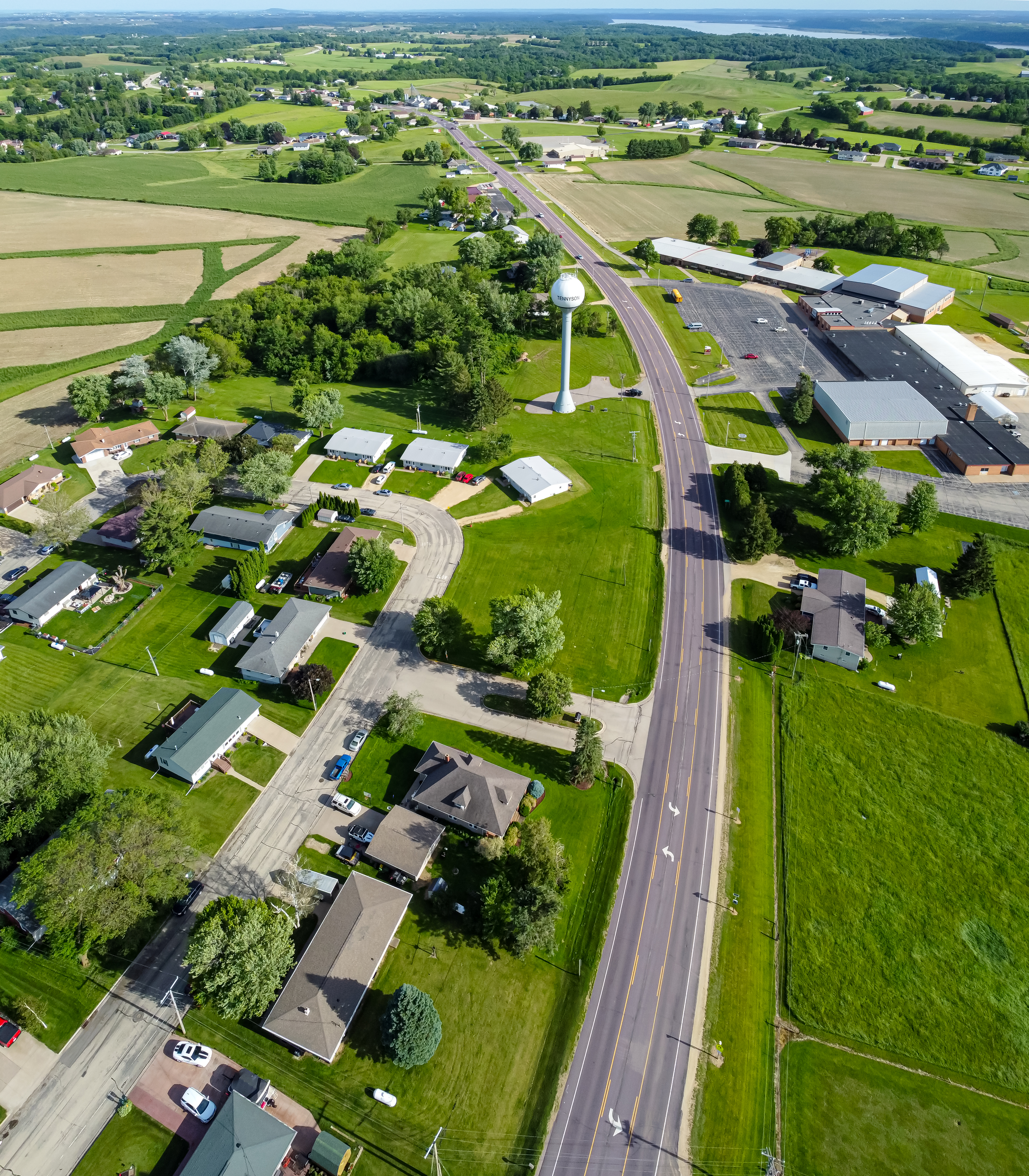
- US-61 and Wis-133 junction in town

- Location of Tennyson in Grant County, Wisconsin.
- Coordinates: 42°41′16″N 90°41′10″W
- Country: United States
- State: Wisconsin
- County: Grant

Area
  - Total: 0.43 sq mi (1.12 km^{2})
  - Land: 0.43 sq mi (1.12 km^{2})
  - Water: 0 sq mi (0.00 km^{2})
- Elevation: 932 ft (284 m)

Population (2020)
  - Total: 348
  - Density: 805/sq mi (311/km^{2})
- Time zone: UTC-6 (Central (CST))
  - Summer (DST): UTC-5 (CDT)
- Area code: 608
- FIPS code: 55-79250
- GNIS feature ID: 1575312

Tennyson is a village in Grant County, Wisconsin, United States, originally called Dutch Hollow. The population was 348 at the 2020 census.

== Geography ==
Tennyson is located at 42°41′16″N 90°41′10″W (42.687731, -90.685990).

According to the United States Census Bureau, the village has a total area of 0.42 square miles (1.09 km^{2}), all land.

== Demographics ==
Historical population
Census	Pop.	Note	%±
1950	211		—
1960	314		48.8%
1970	402		28.0%
1980	476		18.4%
1990	378		−20.6%
2000	370		−2.1%
2010	355		−4.1%
2020	348		−2.0%
U.S. Decennial Census

=== 2010 census ===
As of the census of 2010, there were 355 people, 144 households, and 102 families living in the village. The population density was 845.2 inhabitants per square mile (326.3/km^{2}). There were 148 housing units at an average density of 352.4 per square mile (136.1/km^{2}). The racial makeup of the village was 99.4% White and 0.6% Native American.

There were 144 households, of which 33.3% had children under the age of 18 living with them, 54.9% were married couples living together, 13.2% had a female householder with no husband present, 2.8% had a male householder with no wife present, and 29.2% were non-families. 24.3% of all households were made up of individuals, and 17.4% had someone living alone who was 65 years of age or older. The average household size was 2.47 and the average family size was 2.90.

The median age in the village was 44.3 years. 23.7% of residents were under the age of 18; 9% were between the ages of 18 and 24; 17.7% were from 25 to 44; 28% were from 45 to 64; and 21.7% were 65 years of age or older. The gender makeup of the village was 51.8% male and 48.2% female.

=== 2000 census ===
As of the census of 2000, there were 370 people, 139 households, and 102 families living in the village. The population density was 878.7 people per square mile (340.1/km^{2}). There were 143 housing units at an average density of 339.6 per square mile (131.5/km^{2}). The racial makeup of the village was 100.00% White. Hispanic or Latino of any race were 0.54% of the population.

There were 139 households, out of which 31.7% had children under the age of 18 living with them, 69.8% were married couples living together, 4.3% had a female householder with no husband present, and 25.9% were non-families. 23.7% of all households were made up of individuals, and 9.4% had someone living alone who was 65 years of age or older. The average household size was 2.66 and the average family size was 3.16.

In the village, the population was spread out, with 26.8% under the age of 18, 5.7% from 18 to 24, 25.7% from 25 to 44, 23.8% from 45 to 64, and 18.1% who were 65 years of age or older. The median age was 40 years. For every 100 females there were 103.3 males. For every 100 females age 18 and over, there were 99.3 males.

The median income for a household in the village was $35,000, and the median income for a family was $47,500. Males had a median income of $31,023 versus $19,821 for females. The per capita income for the village was $17,065. About 2.2% of families and 4.0% of the population were below the poverty line, including none of those under age 18 and 15.5% of those age 65 or over.

== Notable people ==
- John M. Walsh, Iowa State Senator, was born in Tennyson.
