= Manitowish River =

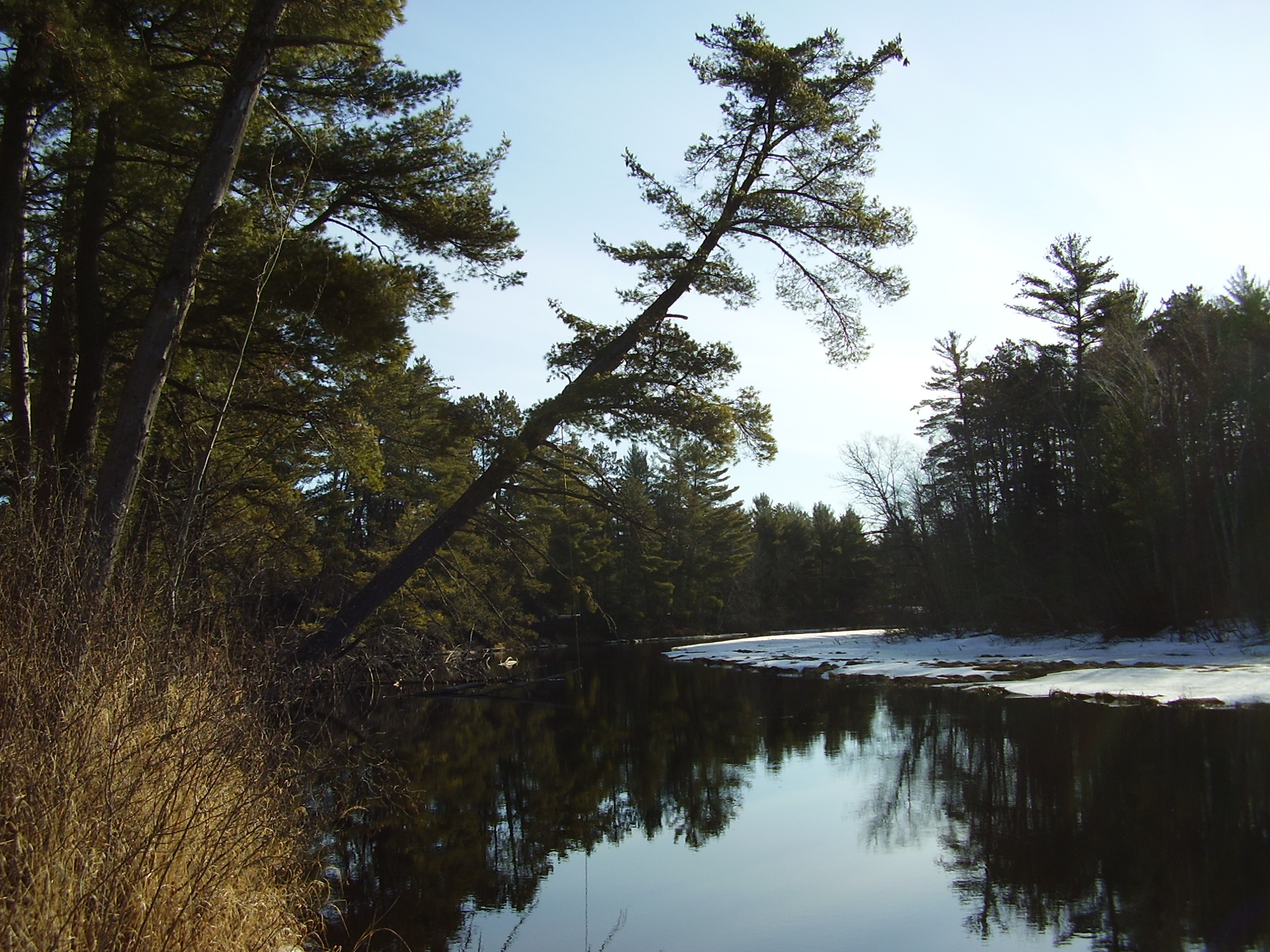
- Manitowish River near the historic Six Pause Portage.

Physical characteristics
- Source
  - coordinates: 46.1360608°N 89.582093°W
- Mouth
  - coordinates: 46.0760598°N 90.0296054°W
  - elevation: 1,575 feet (480 m)

The Manitowish River is a river in Vilas County and Iron County in the state of Wisconsin in the United States. Its source is Fishtrap Lake near Boulder Junction. The confluence of the Manitowish River and the Bear River is the source of the north fork of the Flambeau River. Historically the Manitowish River was an important part of an extensive network of canoe routes linked by short land portages, used by the Ojibwe and fur traders. In modern times the river and the lakes it connects are popular recreational waterways.

By some early accounts Manitowish is derived from a reference to the Ojibwe word for spirit or evil spirit. However the precise origin and meaning of the word is in some dispute.
