= Sherman, Iron County, Wisconsin =

Sherman, Wisconsin
- Town
- Location in Iron County and the state of Wisconsin.
- Coordinates: 46°1′28″N 90°6′18″W
- Country: United States
- State: Wisconsin
- County: Iron

Area
  - Total: 136.6 sq mi (353.7 km^{2})
  - Land: 118.0 sq mi (305.5 km^{2})
  - Water: 18.6 sq mi (48.2 km^{2})
- Elevation: 1,572 ft (479 m)

Population (2020)
  - Total: 286
  - Density: 2.42/sq mi (0.936/km^{2})
- Time zone: UTC-6 (Central (CST))
  - Summer (DST): UTC-5 (CDT)
- Area codes: 715 & 534
- FIPS code: 55-73400
- GNIS feature ID: 1584147
- Website: https://shermanironcowi.gov/

Sherman is a town in Iron County, Wisconsin, United States. The population was 286 at the 2020 census. The unincorporated communities of Powell and Springstead are located in the town. The Lac du Flambeau Band of Lake Superior Chippewa is located partially in the town.

== History ==
It was created on April 19, 1907, as the Town of Emerson and renamed in 1918 to honor the second Town Chair D. William Sherman.

== Geography ==
According to the United States Census Bureau, the town has a total area of 136.6 square miles (353.7 km^{2}), of which 117.9 square miles (305.5 km^{2}) is land and 18.6 square miles (48.3 km^{2}) (13.64%) is water.

== Demographics ==
As of the census of 2000, there were 336 people, 166 households, and 118 families residing in the town. The population density was 2.8 people per square mile (1.1/km^{2}). There were 483 housing units at an average density of 4.1 per square mile (1.6/km^{2}). The racial makeup of the town was 99.11% White, 0.60% Native American, and 0.30% from two or more races.

There were 166 households, out of which 10.2% had children under the age of 18 living with them, 65.1% were married couples living together, 1.8% had a female householder with no husband present, and 28.9% were non-families. 27.7% of all households were made up of individuals, and 12.7% had someone living alone who was 65 years of age or older. The average household size was 2.02 and the average family size was 2.41.

In the town, the population was spread out, with 8.6% under the age of 18, 4.2% from 18 to 24, 14.9% from 25 to 44, 35.1% from 45 to 64, and 37.2% who were 65 years of age or older. The median age was 59 years. For every 100 females, there were 103.6 males. For every 100 females age 18 and over, there were 107.4 males.

The median income for a household in the town was $34,375, and the median income for a family was $38,958. Males had a median income of $30,625 versus $18,750 for females. The per capita income for the town was $24,336. About 1.7% of families and 3.5% of the population were below the poverty line, including none of those under age 18 and 1.4% of those age 65 or over.

== See also ==
- List of towns in Wisconsin
