= South Lancaster, Wisconsin =

- Town
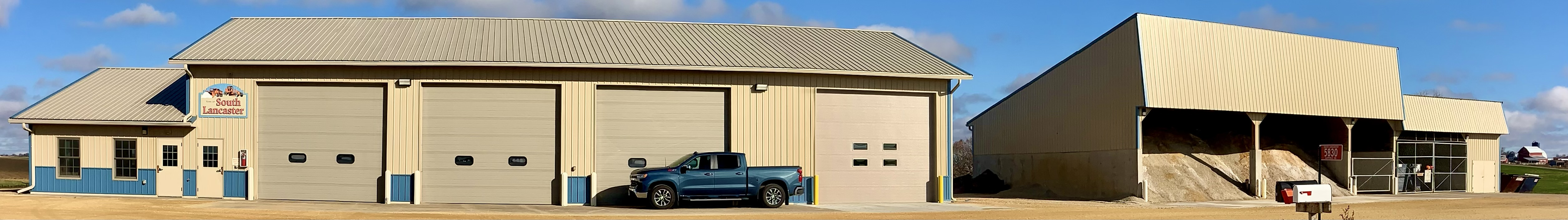
- Town hall

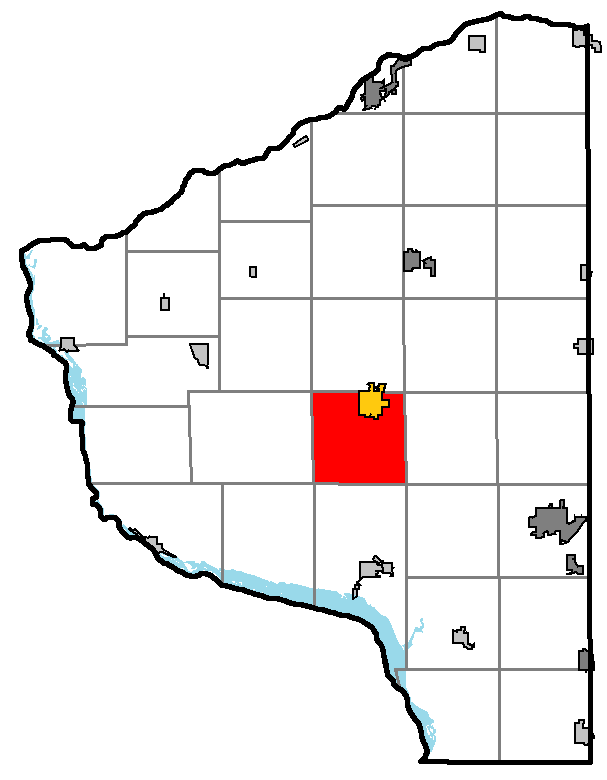
- Location of South Lancaster, within Grant County, Wisconsin

- Location of Grant County, Wisconsin
- Coordinates: 42°48′24″N 90°44′0″W
- Country: United States
- State: Wisconsin
- County: Grant

Area
  - Total: 34.0 sq mi (88.0 km^{2})
  - Land: 34.0 sq mi (88.0 km^{2})
  - Water: 0 sq mi (0.0 km^{2})
- Elevation: 958 ft (292 m)

Population (2020)
  - Total: 884
  - Density: 26.0/sq mi (10.0/km^{2})
- Time zone: UTC-6 (Central (CST))
  - Summer (DST): UTC-5 (CDT)
- Area code: 608
- FIPS code: 55-75075
- GNIS feature ID: 1584178

South Lancaster is a town in Grant County, Wisconsin, United States. The population was 884 at the 2020 census.

== Geography ==
According to the United States Census Bureau, the town has a total area of 34.0 square miles (88.0 km^{2}), all land.

== Demographics ==
As of the 2000 census, there were 808 people, 234 households, and 179 families living in the town. The population density was 23.8 people per square mile (9.2/km^{2}). There were 245 housing units at an average density of 7.2 per square mile (2.8/km^{2}). The racial makeup of the town was 99.63% White, 0.25% Asian, and 0.12% from two or more races.

Of the 234 households 36.8% had children under the age of 18 living with them, 66.7% were married couples living together, 4.7% had a female householder with no husband present, and 23.1% were non-families. 14.5% of households were one person and 5.1% were one person aged 65 or older. The average household size was 2.84 and the average family size was 3.17.

The age distribution was 23.5% under the age of 18, 8.3% from 18 to 24, 24.5% from 25 to 44, 24.4% from 45 to 64, and 19.3% 65 or older. The median age was 41 years. For every 100 females, there were 102.5 males. For every 100 females age 18 and over, there were 100.6 males.

The median household income was $36,250 and the median family income was $38,333. Males had a median income of $26,917 versus $19,432 for females. The per capita income for the town was $18,698. About 1.1% of families and 5.0% of the population were below the poverty line, including 3.3% of those under age 18 and 3.0% of those age 65 or over.
