= Wisconsin Highway 156 =

State highway in Wisconsin, United States

State Trunk Highway 156
- WIS 156 highlighted in red

Route information
- Maintained by WisDOT
- Length: 28.35 mi (45.62 km)

Major junctions
- West end: WIS 22 in Clintonville
- East end: WIS 29 / WIS 32 in Pittsfield

Location
- Country: United States
- State: Wisconsin
- Counties: Waupaca, Shawano, Brown

Highway system
- Wisconsin State Trunk Highway System; Interstate; US; State; Scenic; Rustic
← WIS 155	→ WIS 157

State Trunk Highway 156 (often called Highway 156, STH-156 or WIS 156) is a 28.35-mile (45.62 km) state highway in the U.S. state of Wisconsin. The highway runs east–west through northeast Wisconsin, passing through Waupaca, Shawano, and Brown counties. Highway 156 runs from Wisconsin Highway 22 in Clintonville east to Wisconsin Highway 29 in far western Brown County northwest of Green Bay. The highway is maintained by the Wisconsin Department of Transportation.

== Route description ==
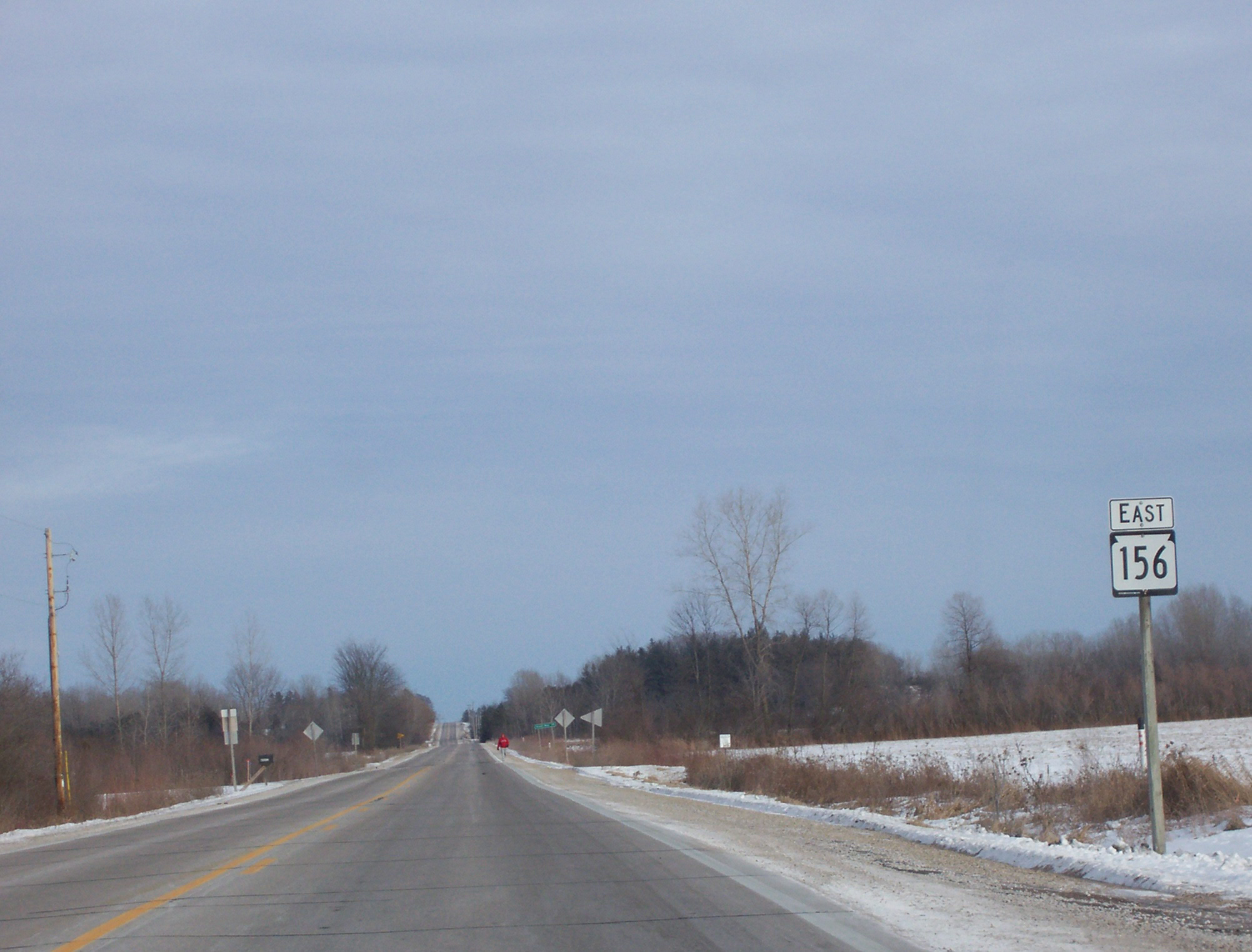
WIS 156 in rural Shawano County, Wisconsin

Highway 156 begins at an intersection with Highway 22 in Clintonville. The route leaves Clintonville and runs through eastern Waupaca County before crossing into Shawano County. Highway 156 meets Highway 187 in southwest Shawano County. The highway runs through southern Shawano County and passes through the community of Navarino before meeting Highway 47 near Briarton. Highway 156 continues eastward through Briarton and meets Highway 55 in Rose Lawn before terminating at Highway 29 in Brown County.

== History ==
The original route of Highway 156 ran from the intersection of Wisconsin Highway 22 and U.S. Route 45 in Clintonville to Nichols via Leeman. In 1954, the western terminus of the highway was moved north to its present location, and the highway ran westward until becoming concurrent with Highway 187 at their present junction. In the mid-1980s, Highway 156 was realigned to its current route; the former route remained Highway 187 on the concurrency and became Highway 168 from Leeman to Nichols.

== Major intersections ==
County	Location	mi	km	Destinations	Notes
Waupaca	Clintonville	0.0	0.0	WIS 22 – Shawano, Clintonville	Western terminus
Shawano	Town of Navarino	8.6	13.8	WIS 187 south – Shiocton	
Shawano	Town of Lessor	16.2	26.1	WIS 47 north – Bonduel	Western end of WIS 47 concurrency
Shawano	Town of Lessor	16.7	26.9	WIS 47 south – Black Creek, Appleton	Eastern end of WIS 47 concurrency
Shawano	Rose Lawn	22.7	36.5	WIS 55 – Angelica, Seymour	
Brown	Pittsfield	28.3	45.5	WIS 29 / WIS 32 south – Wausau, Green Bay WIS 32 north – Pulaski	Eastern terminus
1.000 mi = 1.609 km; 1.000 km = 0.621 mi: Concurrency terminus
