= Maine, Wisconsin =

Maine, Wisconsin may refer to:

- Maine (village), Wisconsin, a village in Marathon County, Wisconsin
- Maine (town), Wisconsin, a town in Outgamie County, Wisconsin
