= Briarton, Wisconsin =

Coordinates: 44°36′12″N 88°25′35″W

- unincorporated community
- Interactive map of Briarton, Wisconsin
- Country: United States
- State: Wisconsin
- County: Shawano
- Elevation: 820 ft (250 m)
- Time zone: UTC-6 (Central (CST))
  - Summer (DST): UTC-5 (CDT)

Briarton is an unincorporated community in Shawano County, Wisconsin, United States, in the Town of Lessor, west of Green Bay.

== History ==
Briarton had a post office, which was established April 18, 1883 and discontinued on May 31, 1904. A 1921 gazetteer indicates that businesses in the community on that date included two general stores, a sawmill, a store for agricultural implements, and one for soft drinks. Rural mail delivery was being performed from nearby Leeman, and the closest bank was in Galesburg (now the community of Navarino).

== Transportation ==
Before 1950, Briarton was located at the intersection of Wisconsin Highway 47 and (then) County Trunk Highway W. On the weekend of October 1, 1950, a new alignment of the highway was opened which bypassed the community. The north–south road through Briarton has been known as Old 47 Road (or variants thereof) since.

In approximately 1985–1986, County Trunk Highway W through Briarton was taken over by the State of Wisconsin and made part of Wisconsin Highway 156. Highway 156 is a well traveled state highway and indirectly connects Briarton with larger cities. Briarton can also be reached by snowmobile trail during the winter months as trails run into town.
