= W34 =

W34 or W.34 may refer to:

- W34 (nuclear warhead), an American nuclear bomb
- Great triambic icosahedron
- Hansa-Brandenburg W.34, a German prototype floatplane
- Junkers W 34, a German transport aircraft
- Pinikura language
- Pippu Station, in Hokkaido, Japan
- Sh 2-37, a nebula containing the radio source W 34
- Shiocton Airport, in Wisconsin, United States
