= Wisconsin Highway 168 =

State highway in Wisconsin, United States

State Trunk Highway 168

Route information
- Maintained by WisDOT
- Length: 5.93 mi (9.54 km)
- Existed: c. 1985–2003

Major junctions
- West end: WIS 47 east of Nichols
- East end: WIS 55 near Seymour

Location
- Country: United States
- State: Wisconsin

Highway system
- Wisconsin State Trunk Highway System; Interstate; US; State; Scenic; Rustic
← WIS 167	→ WIS 169

State Trunk Highway 168 (often called Highway 168, STH-168 or WIS 168) was a state highway in the U.S. state of Wisconsin. It ran east–west for 5.93 miles (9.54 km) between Nichols and Seymour. Because it paralleled WIS 54 and WIS 156, the road was turned over to Outagamie County control in 2003, and is now designated as County Trunk Highway VV (CTH-VV).

== Route description ==
At its latest routing, WIS 168 began its journey east from WIS 47 east of Nichols. Then, traveling under six miles (9.7 km) east, WIS 168 ended at WIS 55 north of Seymour.

== History ==
In 1934, WIS 168 was first established to travel along present-day CTH-A and 13th Avenue from US Highway 16 (US 16, now WIS 16) to the Quarry Hill Road/Cinder Avenue intersection. This intersection was located at Camp McCoy (now relocated and named Fort McCoy), a military base northeast of Sparta. During its existence, no significant changes were made. In 1959, the routing was removed.

In the mid-1980s, WIS 168 was re-established after an easternmost portion of WIS 156 (east of WIS 187) was moved northward. As a result, WIS 168 filled in the former alignment east of Leeman. It ran from WIS 187 in Leeman to WIS 55 near Nichols. In 1996, part of WIS 55 north of Seymour shifted eastward along former CTH-C. As a result, WIS 168 extended east along WIS 55's former alignment. Then, in 1998, the original portion of WIS 168 was removed in favor of turning this portion into a locally-controlled route (replaced by CTH-F). In 2003, WIS 168 was entirely removed in favor of CTH-VV. WIS 168 has not been used ever since.

== Major intersections ==
The entire highway was in Outagamie County.

Location	mi	km	Destinations	Notes
Town of Cicero	0.00	0.00	WIS 47 – Nichols, Black Creek, Shawano	
Town of Seymour	5.93	9.54	WIS 55 – Seymour, Angelica; CTH-VV – Isaar	Roadway continued as CTH-VV
1.000 mi = 1.609 km; 1.000 km = 0.621 mi
