= Shioc River =

River in north east Wisconsin

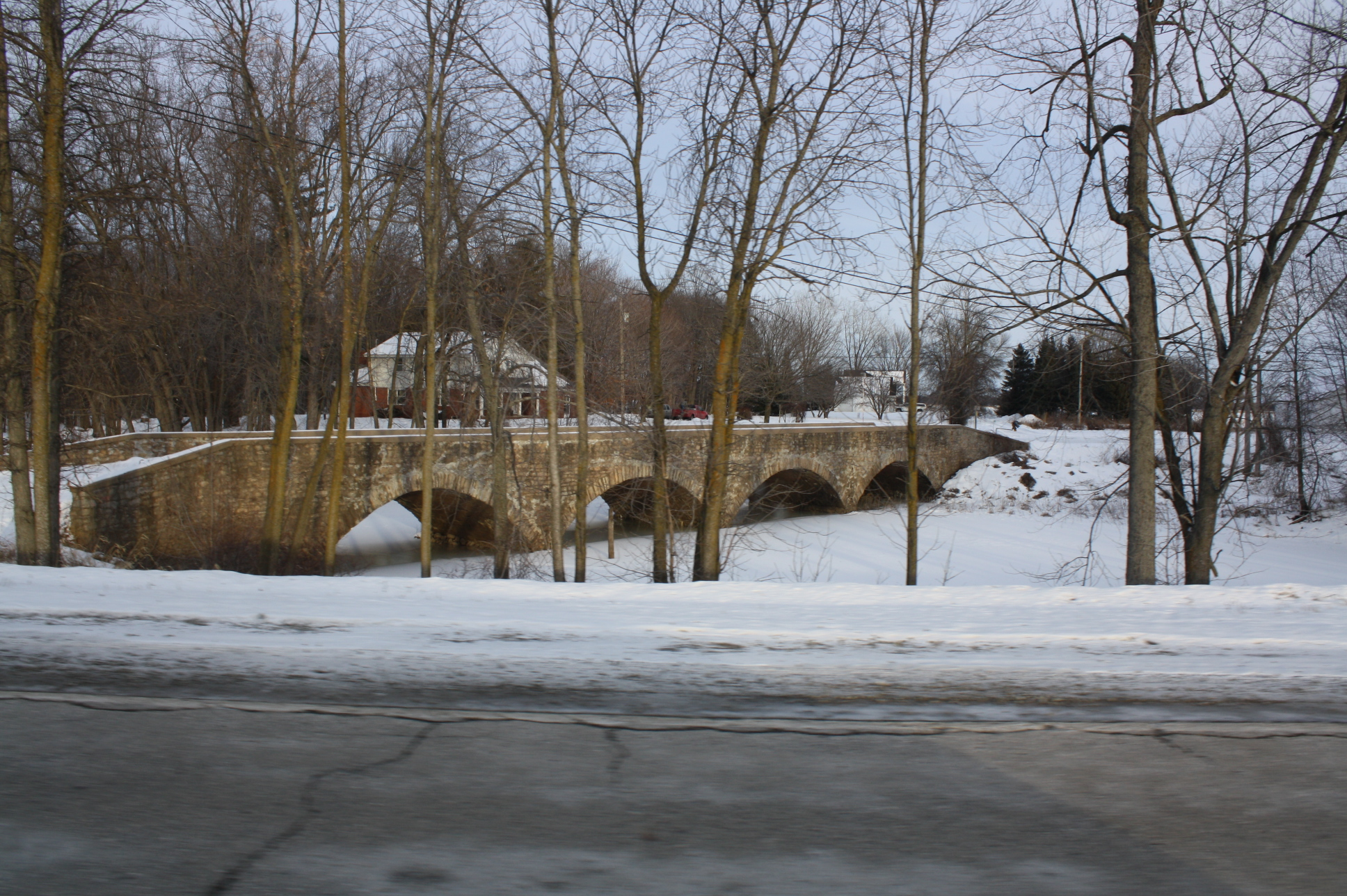
- Barteau Bridge over the Shoic River just north of Shiocton

- Location within Wisconsin Location within the United States

Location
- Country: United States
- State: Wisconsin

Physical characteristics
- Source: Near Navarino
  - coordinates: 44.6394316°N 88.4878791°W
- Mouth: Wolf River
  - location: Shiocton
  - coordinates: 44.4519279°N 88.5731568°W
  - elevation: 758 ft (231 m)
- Length: 33 mi (53 km)

Basin features
- River system: Fox-Wolf
- Tributaries
  - left: Slab City Creek
  - right: Black Creek, Toad Creek, Herman Creek, Mink Creek
- Bridges: Barteau Bridge

The Shioc River is a river in north east Wisconsin that flows through the village of Shiocton and into the Wolf River. The source is near the census-designated place of Navarino, in the town of Navarino.

== See also ==
List of Wisconsin rivers
