= Barteau Bridge =

- U.S. National Register of Historic Places
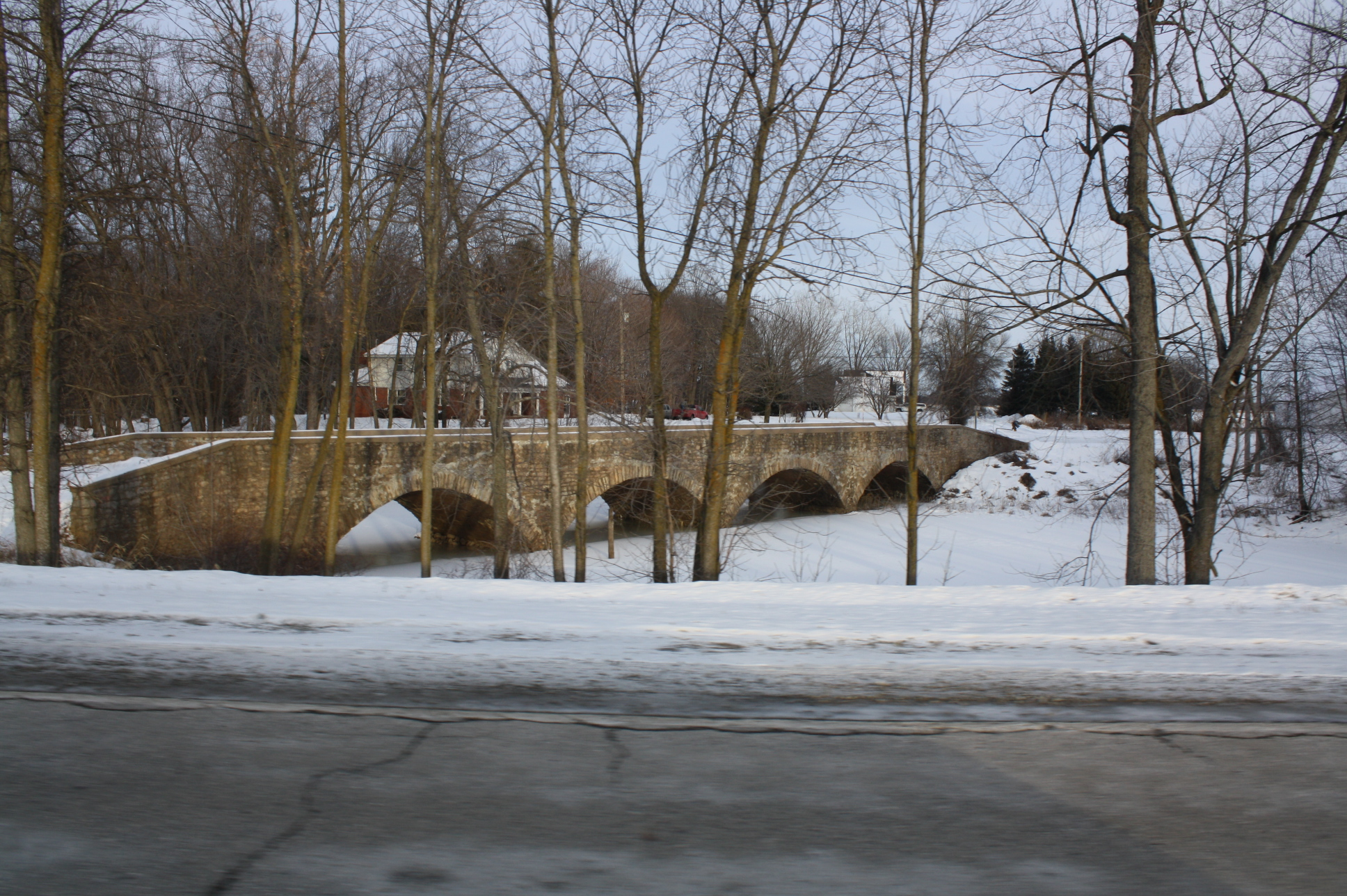

- Location within Wisconsin Location within the United States
- Location: N. of WI 187 crossing of Shioc R., Bovina, Wisconsin
- Coordinates: 44°27′56″N 88°34′0″W
- Area: less than one acre
- Built: 1905-06
- Built by: Garvey, James
- Architect: Hayes, John H.
- Architectural style: Stone arch Bridge
- NRHP reference No.: 02000285
- Added to NRHP: March 28, 2002

The Barteau Bridge, also known as Shioc Road Bridge, is a four-arch limestone arch bridge in Bovina, Wisconsin built during 1905–06. It was added to the National Register of Historic Places in 2002 for its engineering significance.

The bridge brought a two-lane road over the Shioc River. John W. Hayes prepared plans for the bridge; James P. Garvey, of Freedom, was contracted to build it, for $6,795.

The bridge was bypassed in 1979.
