= Berlin, Marathon County, Wisconsin =

Town of Berlin, Wisconsin
- Town
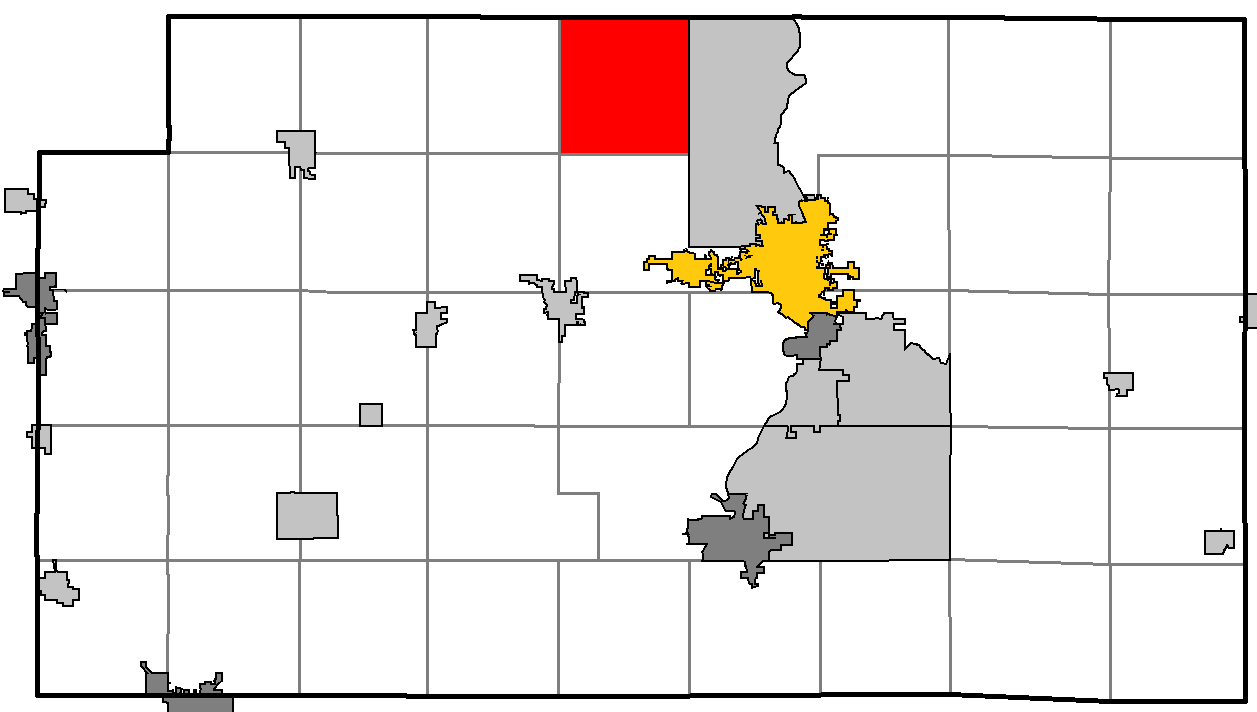
- Location of Berlin, Marathon County

- Location of Marathon County
- Coordinates: 45°4′8″N 89°47′36″W
- Country: United States
- State: Wisconsin
- County: Marathon

Area
  - Total: 34.7 sq mi (89.8 km^{2})
  - Land: 34.7 sq mi (89.8 km^{2})
  - Water: 0 sq mi (0.0 km^{2})
- Elevation: 1,293 ft (394 m)

Population (2020)
  - Total: 949
  - Density: 27.4/sq mi (10.6/km^{2})
- Time zone: UTC-6 (Central (CST))
  - Summer (DST): UTC-5 (CDT)
- Area codes: 715 & 534
- FIPS code: 55-06975
- GNIS feature ID: 1582801
- Website: https://townberlinmcwi.gov/

There is another Town of Berlin in Green Lake County, Wisconsin. There is also the city of Berlin, Wisconsin.

Berlin is a town in Marathon County, Wisconsin, United States. It is part of the Wausau, Wisconsin Metropolitan Statistical Area. The population was 949 at the 2020 census. The unincorporated communities of Emmerich and Naugart are located in the town. The unincorporated community of Teagesville is also located partially in the town. The ghost town of Ziegler was also located in the town.

== Geography ==
According to the United States Census Bureau, the town has a total area of 34.7 square miles (89.8 km^{2}), all land.

== Demographics ==
As of the census of 2000, there were 887 people, 313 households, and 256 families residing in the town. The population density was 25.6 people per square mile (9.9/km^{2}). There were 330 housing units at an average density of 9.5 per square mile (3.7/km^{2}). The racial makeup of the town was 99.55% White, 0.11% from other races, and 0.34% from two or more races. Hispanic or Latino of any race were 0.56% of the population.

There were 313 households, out of which 37.4% had children under the age of 18 living with them, 73.8% were married couples living together, 4.2% had a female householder with no husband present, and 17.9% were non-families. 16.6% of all households were made up of individuals, and 6.7% had someone living alone who was 65 years of age or older. The average household size was 2.83 and the average family size was 3.19.

The population was 27.5% under the age of 18, 6.1% from 18 to 24, 30.4% from 25 to 44, 24.0% from 45 to 64, and 12.0% who were 65 years of age or older. The median age was 38 years. For every 100 females, there were 102.1 males. For every 100 females age 18 and over, there were 103.5 males.

The median income for a household in the town was $53,125, and the median income for a family was $60,000. Males had a median income of $35,385 versus $23,125 for females. The per capita income for the town was $20,958. About 1.5% of families and 2.1% of the population were below the poverty line, including 1.6% of those under age 18 and 11.0% of those age 65 or over.

== Notable people ==
- Robert Plisch, farmer and politician, lived in the town
