= Wisconsin Highway 187 =

State highway in Wisconsin, United States

State Trunk Highway 187
- WIS 187 highlighted in red

Route information
- Maintained by WisDOT
- Length: 13.87 mi (22.32 km)
- Existed: 1947–present

Major junctions
- South end: WIS 54 in Shiocton
- North end: WIS 156 in Navarino

Location
- Country: United States
- State: Wisconsin
- Counties: Outagamie, Shawano

Highway system
- Wisconsin State Trunk Highway System; Interstate; US; State; Scenic; Rustic
← WIS 186	→ WIS 188

State Trunk Highway 187 (often called Highway 187, STH-187 or WIS 187) is a state highway in the U.S. state of Wisconsin. It runs north–south in central Wisconsin from the intersection of WIS 54 near Shiocton to the junction of WIS 156 just west of Navarino. WIS 187 passes through sparsely populated, rural areas in the flat river valley of the Wolf River. The routing of the present WIS 187 has barely been changed since the introduction of the Wisconsin State Highway system in the 1920s.

== Route description ==
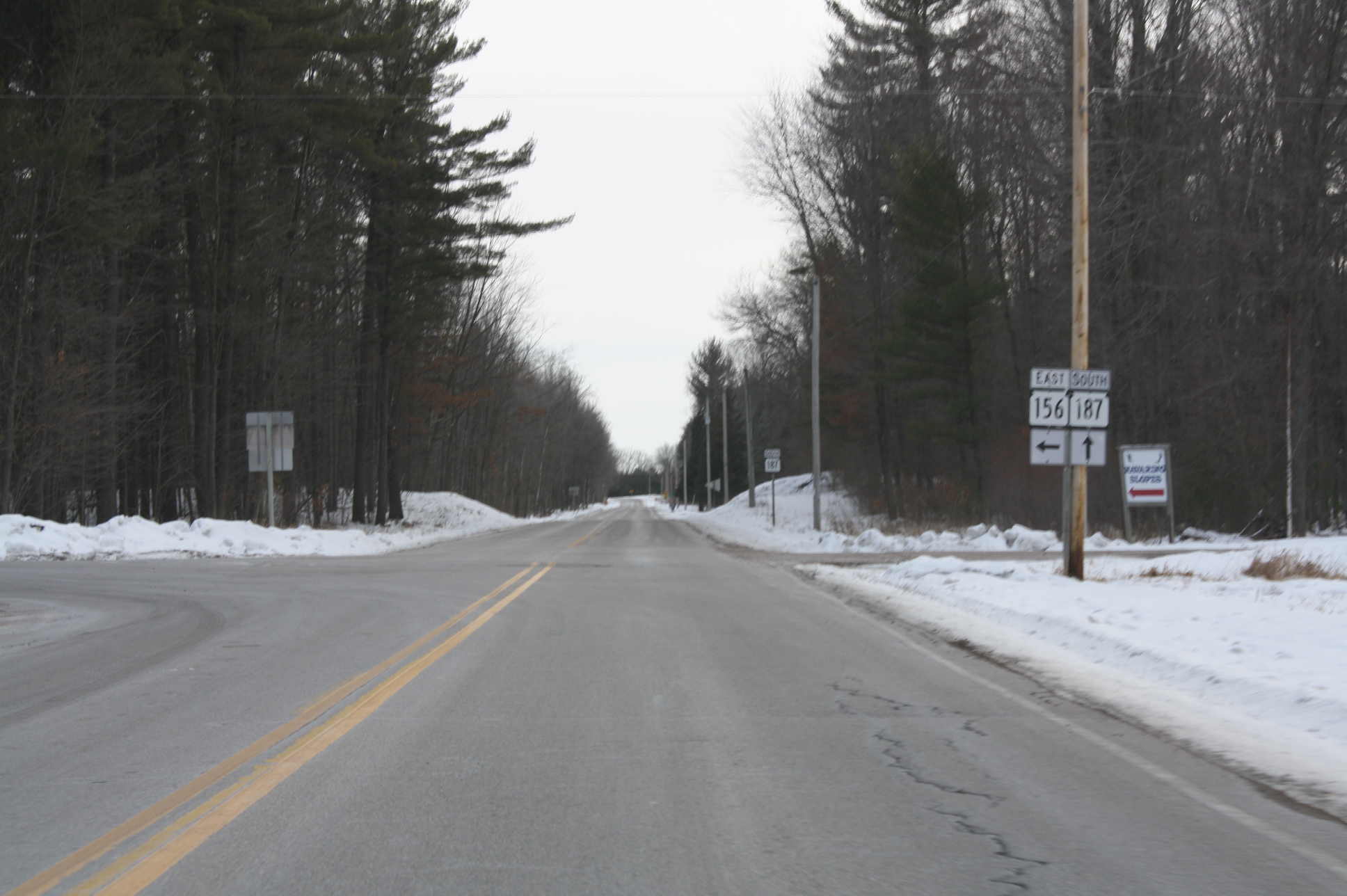
Looking south at northern terminus

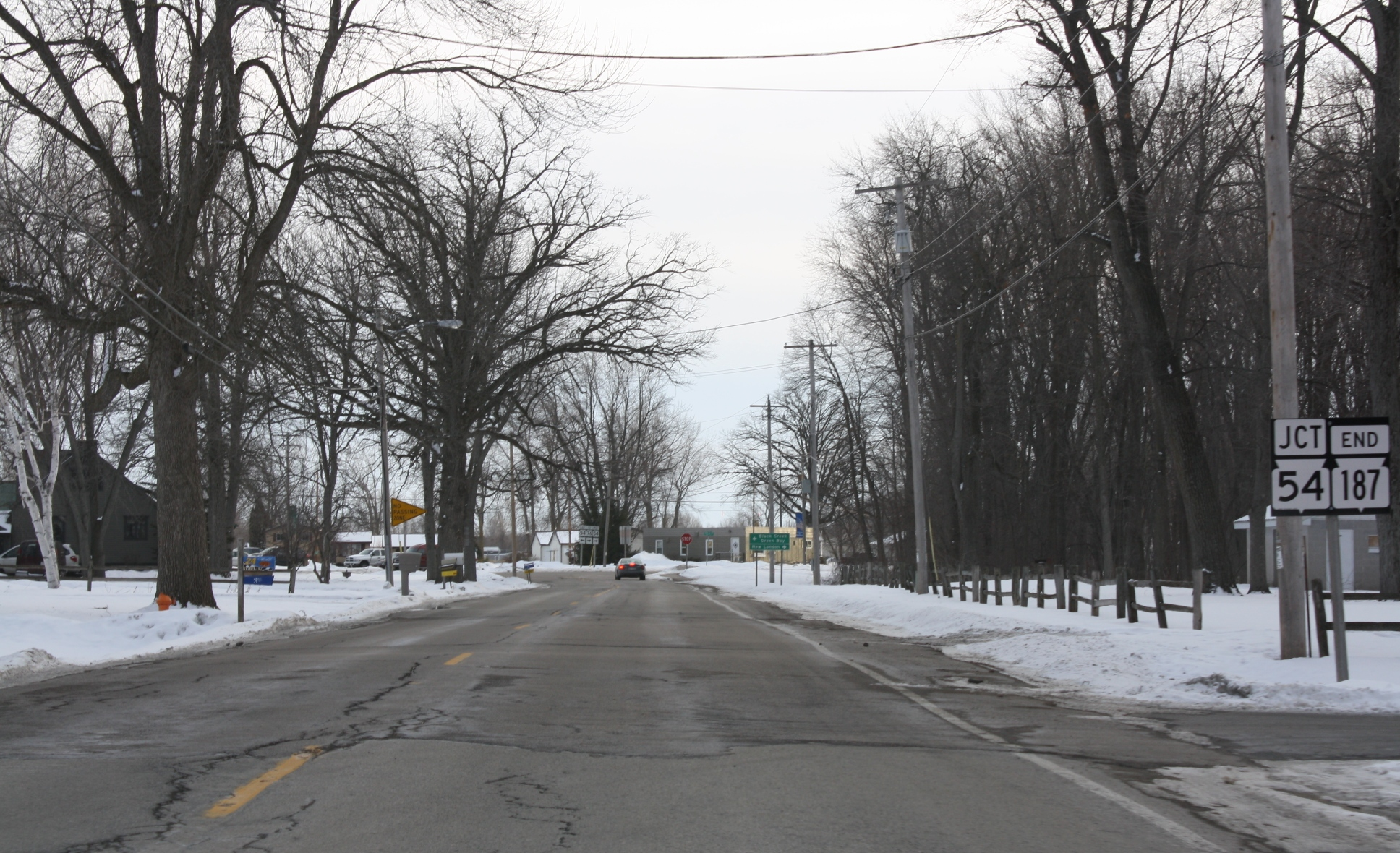
Looking south at southern terminus in Shiocton

WIS 187 starts at an intersection with WIS 54 (Rexford Avenue) on the east side of Shiocton. The highway runs north from this intersection along Hamlin Street to the east of the Wolf River through farm fields. North of an intersection with Deer View Road, the highway curves to the northeast and then back to the northwest by the Maine State Wildlife Area in the Town of Maine. North of the protected area, the highway returns to a due northerly course. After crossing from Outagamie County into Shawano County, WIS 187 turns to the northwest and then terminates at its intersection with WIS 156.

== History ==
Formed in 1947, WIS 187 was created when County Trunk Highway B (CTH-B) in Outagamie and Shawano counties was transferred to state control; at the time, it extended north to Shawano. In the 1980s, the segment north of WIS 156 was transferred back to Shawano County and redesignated CTH-K. At the same time, WIS 156 was rerouted, removing a concurrent segment of WIS 156/WIS 187.

== Major intersections ==
County	Location	mi	km	Destinations	Notes
Outagamie	Shiocton	0.00	0.00	WIS 54 – Black Creek, New London, Green Bay	
Shawano	Town of Navarino	13.87	22.32	WIS 156 – Navarino, Clintonville	
1.000 mi = 1.609 km; 1.000 km = 0.621 mi
