= Leeman, Wisconsin =

- Unincorporated community
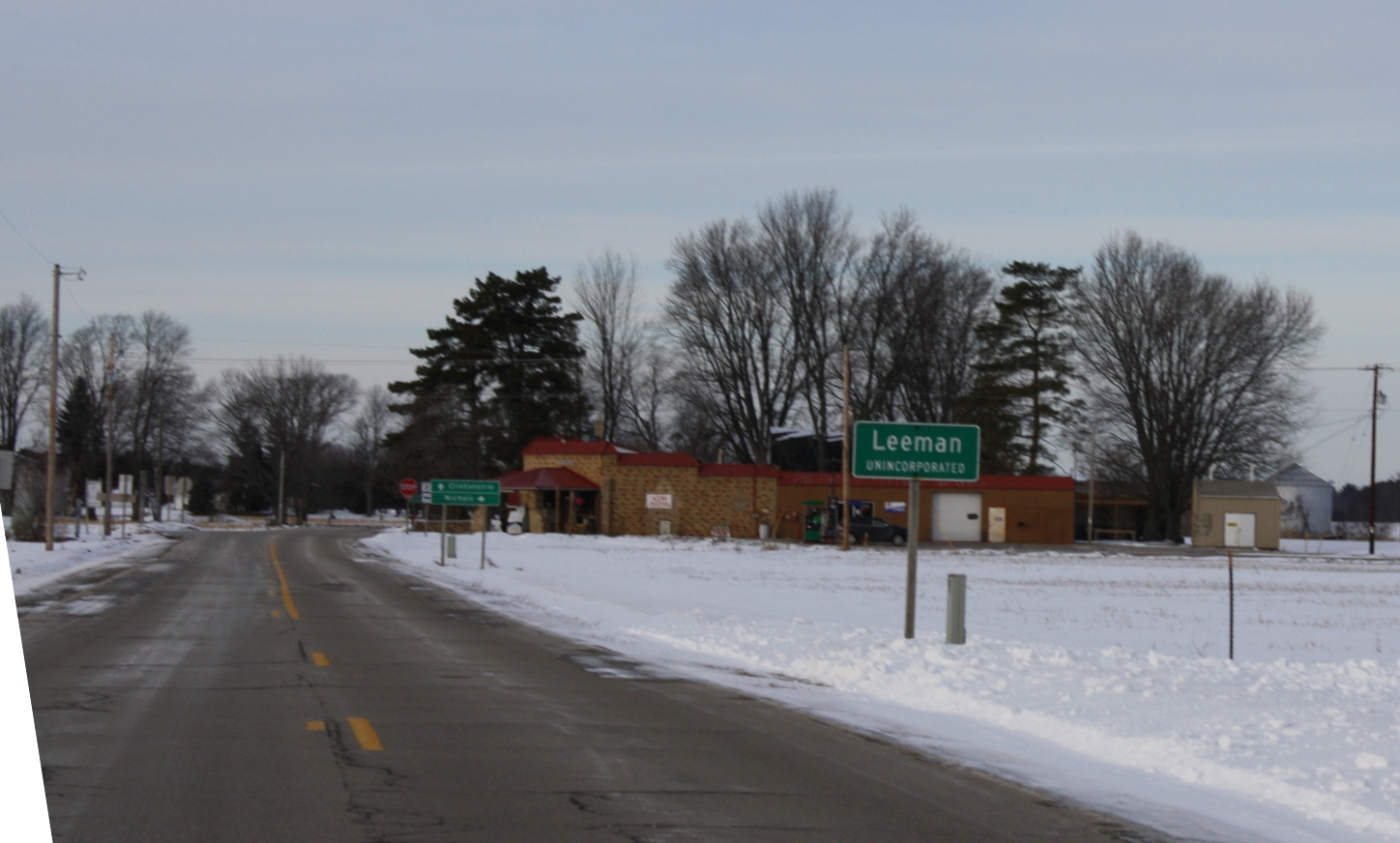
- Looking north at Leeman

- Location within Wisconsin Location within the United States
- Coordinates: 44°34′27″N 88°33′23″W
- Country: United States
- State: Wisconsin
- County: Outagamie
- Town: Maine
- Time zone: UTC-6 (Central (CST))
  - Summer (DST): UTC-5 (CDT)

Leeman is a small unincorporated community located in the Town of Maine in northern Outagamie County, Wisconsin, United States. It is two miles west of Nichols and one mile south of Shawano County. The Wolf River runs through the community. Postal service is provided by the Shiocton post office, ZIP code 54170.

== Transportation ==
Leeman is located on Wisconsin Highway 187 and Wisconsin Highway 168. Outagamie County Highway F also enters the community.

== Images ==
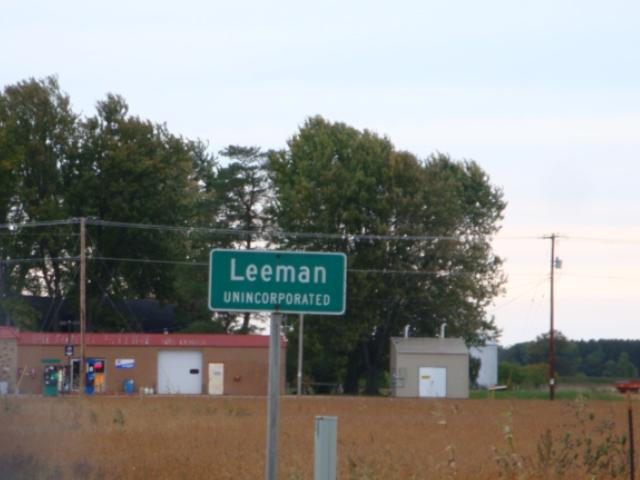
Welcome sign

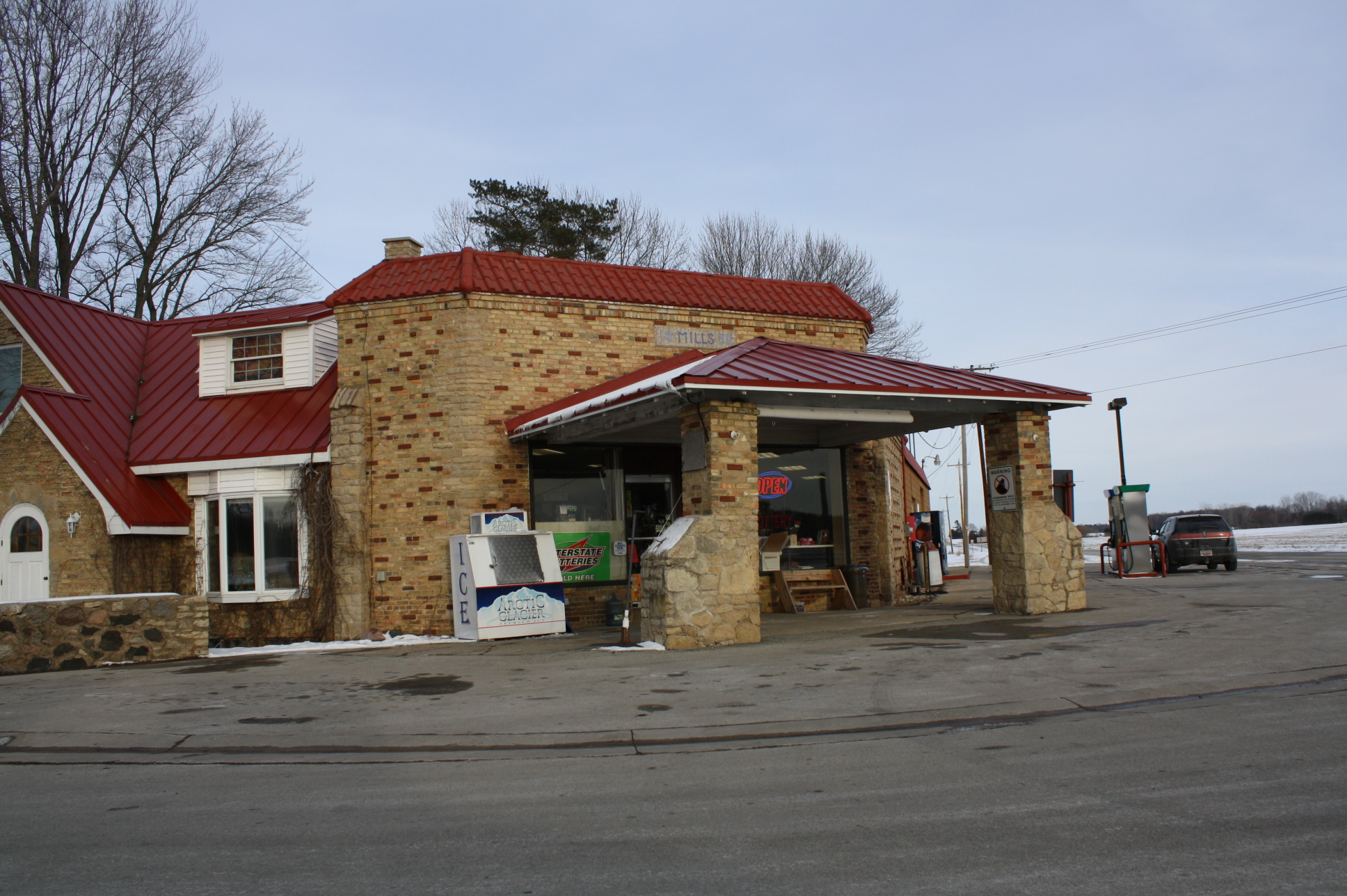
Leeman market. A gas station in Leeman
