= Emmerich, Wisconsin =

Unincorporated community in Wisconsin, United States

- Unincorporated community
- Location within Wisconsin Location within the United States
- Coordinates: 45°05′27″N 89°49′45″W
- Country: United States
- State: Wisconsin
- County: Marathon
- Elevation: 1,421 ft (433 m)
- Time zone: UTC-6 (Central (CST))
  - Summer (DST): UTC-5 (CDT)
- Area codes: 715 & 534
- GNIS feature ID: 1844104

Emmerich is an unincorporated community located in the town of Berlin, Marathon County, Wisconsin, United States. Emmerich is located on County Highway F, 13.3 miles (21.4 km) northwest of Wausau.
