= Taegesville, Wisconsin =

- Unincorporated community
- Location within Wisconsin Location within the United States
- Coordinates: 45°02′48″N 89°43′35″W
- Country: United States
- State: Wisconsin
- County: Marathon
- Elevation: 1,401 ft (427 m)
- Time zone: UTC-6 (Central (CST))
  - Summer (DST): UTC-5 (CDT)
- Area codes: 715 & 534
- GNIS feature ID: 1577848

Taegesville is an unincorporated community located in the towns of Berlin and Maine, Marathon County, Wisconsin, United States. Taegesville is located on County Highway A, 7.5 miles (12.1 km) northwest of Wausau.
