= Maine (town), Wisconsin =

Maine, Wisconsin
- Town
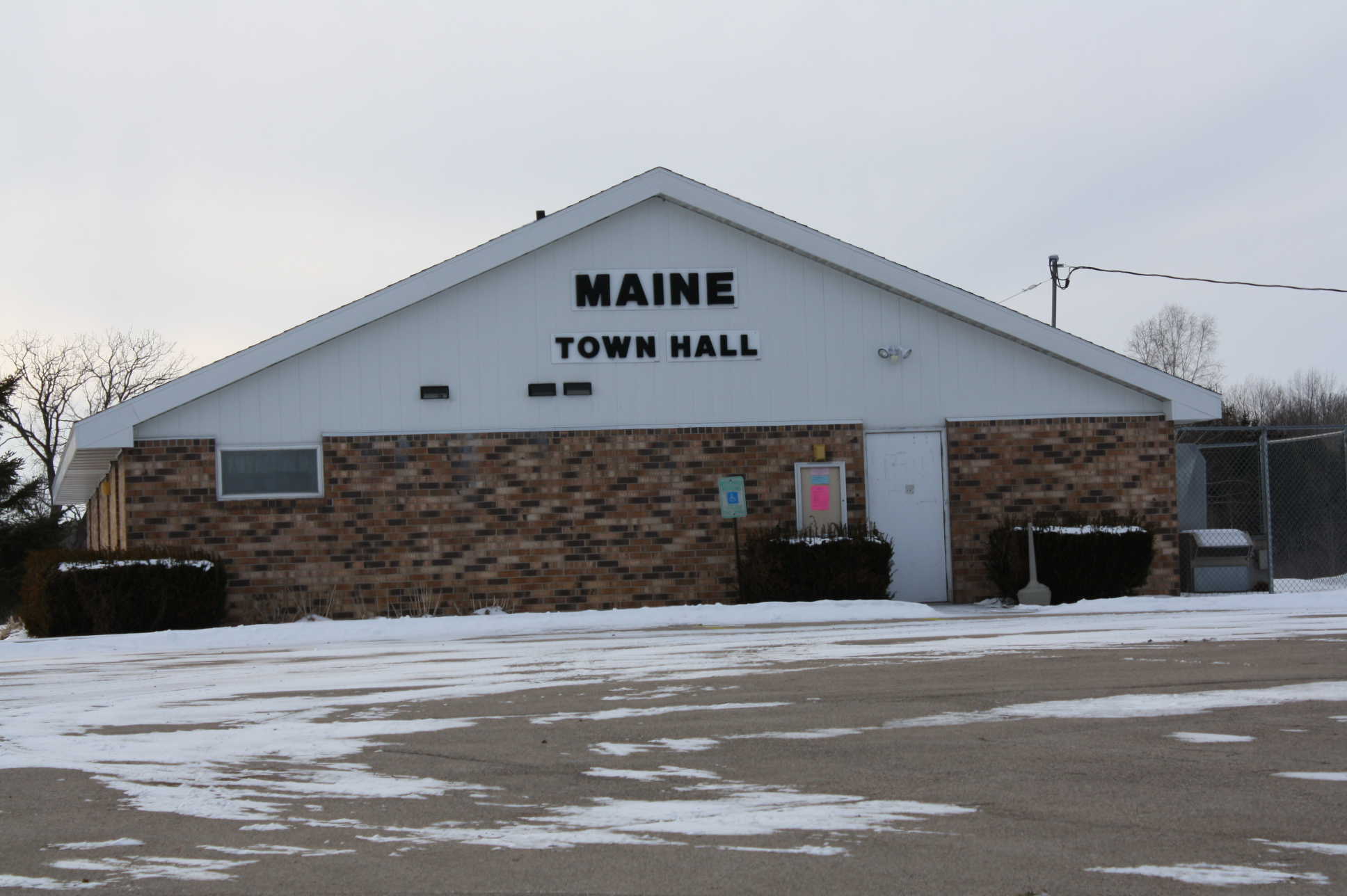
- Town hall

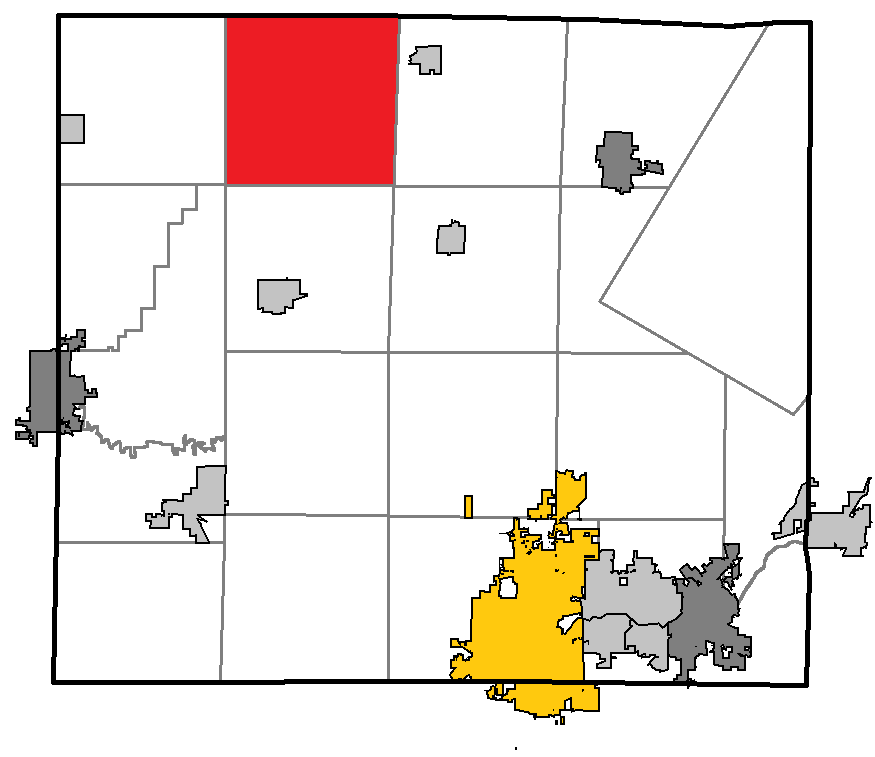
- Location of Maine, within Outagamie County
- Coordinates: 44°33′56″N 88°32′53″W
- Country: United States
- State: Wisconsin
- County: Outagamie

Area
  - Total: 37.4 sq mi (96.9 km^{2})
  - Land: 36.6 sq mi (94.8 km^{2})
  - Water: 0.77 sq mi (2.0 km^{2})
- Elevation: 784 ft (239 m)

Population (2020)
  - Total: 851
  - Density: 23.2/sq mi (8.98/km^{2})
- Time zone: UTC-6 (Central (CST))
  - Summer (DST): UTC-5 (CDT)
- FIPS code: 55-48250
- GNIS feature ID: 1583631
- Website: townofmaineoutagamie.com

Maine is a town in Outagamie County, Wisconsin, United States. As of the 2020 census, the population was 851. The unincorporated community of Leeman is located in this town.

== Geography ==
According to the United States Census Bureau, the town has a total area of 37.4 square miles (96.9 km^{2}), of which, 36.6 square miles (94.8 km^{2}) of it is land and 0.8 square miles (2.0 km^{2}) of it (2.11%) is water.

== Demographics ==
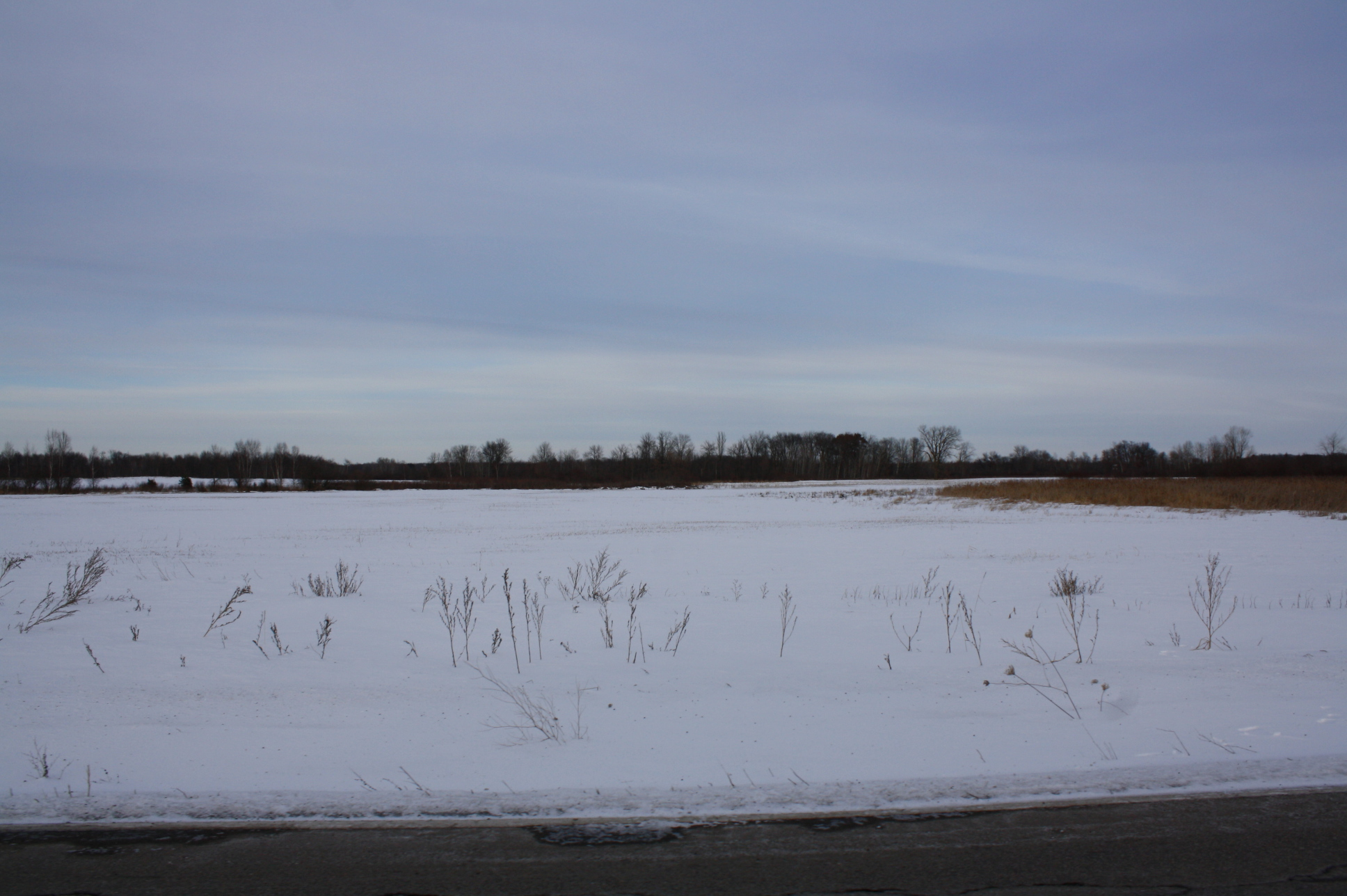
Landscape along Wisconsin Highway 187.

As of the census of 2000, there were 831 people, 304 households, and 231 families residing in the town. The population density was 22.7 people per square mile (8.8/km^{2}). There were 326 housing units at an average density of 8.9 per square mile (3.4/km^{2}). The racial makeup of the town was 96.99% White, 0.24% African American, 0.48% Native American, 1.93% from other races, and 0.36% from two or more races. Hispanic or Latino of any race were 2.41% of the population.

There were 304 households, out of which 32.6% had children under the age of 18 living with them, 65.1% were married couples living together, 6.3% had a female householder with no husband present, and 23.7% were non-families. 18.8% of all households were made up of individuals, and 5.6% had someone living alone who was 65 years of age or older. The average household size was 2.73 and the average family size was 3.12.

In the town, the population was spread out, with 25.4% under the age of 18, 8.4% from 18 to 24, 28.2% from 25 to 44, 26.8% from 45 to 64, and 11.2% who were 65 years of age or older. The median age was 38 years. For every 100 females, there were 121.0 males. For every 100 females age 18 and over, there were 118.3 males.

The median income for a household in the town was $46,058, and the median income for a family was $49,531. Males had a median income of $34,653 versus $26,364 for females. The per capita income for the town was $18,125. About 3.7% of families and 4.8% of the population were below the poverty line, including 5.2% of those under age 18 and 6.4% of those age 65 or over.

== Town of Maine versus Village of Maine ==
in Marathon County, there is also a Village of Maine. In Wisconsin, villages and towns are distinct types of administrative units.
