= Shiocton Airport =

Small airport located in Shiocton, Wisconsin

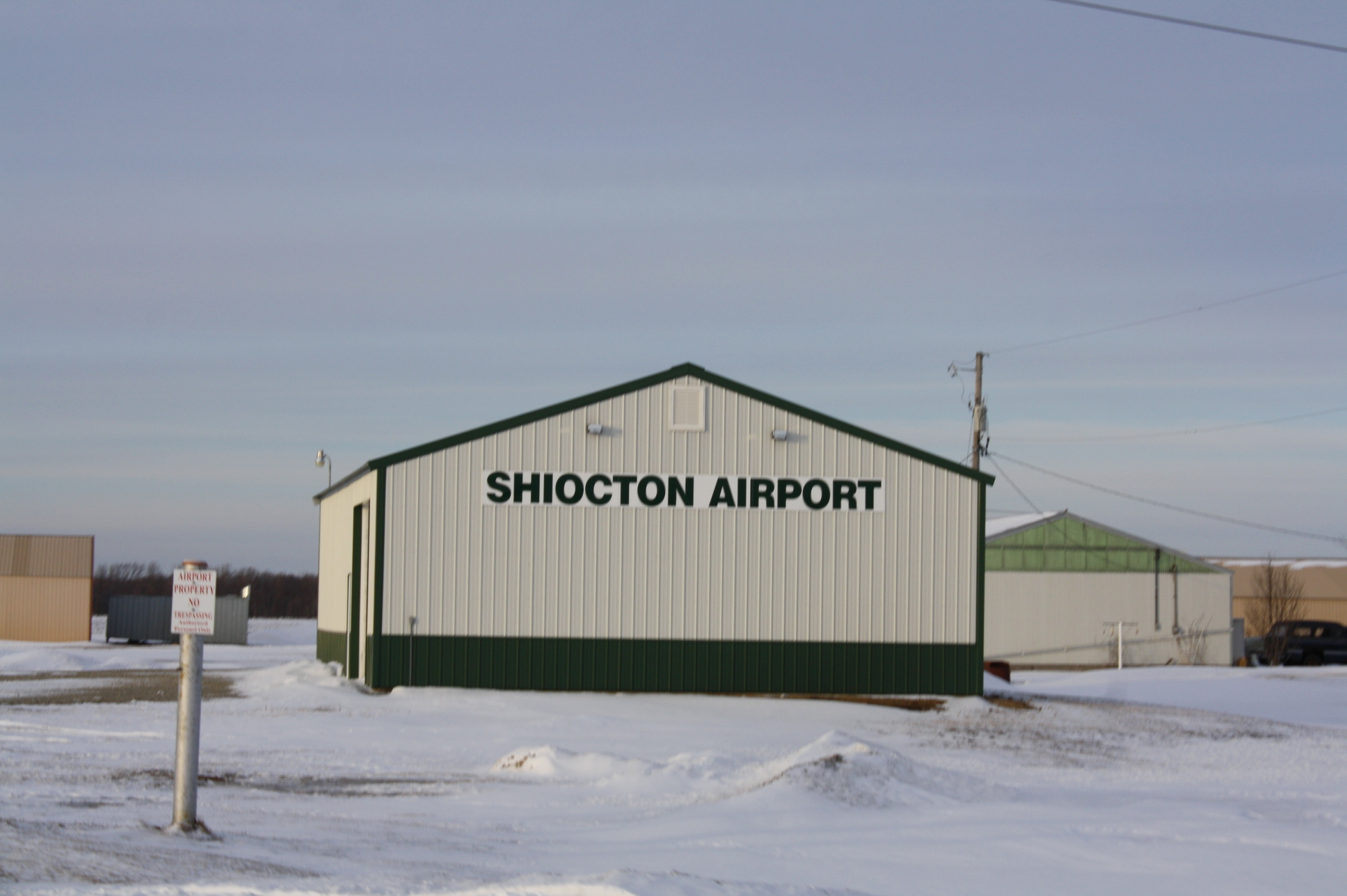
- IATA: none; ICAO: none; FAA LID: W34

Summary
- Airport type: Public
- Owner: Shiocton Flyers Club
- Serves: Shiocton, Wisconsin
- Opened: June 1986
- Time zone: CST (UTC−06:00)
  - Summer (DST): CDT (UTC−05:00)
- Elevation AMSL: 760 ft / 232 m
- Coordinates: 44°27′20″N 088°33′40″W
- Website: shioctonairport.com

Map
- Location of airport in Wisconsin W34 (the United States)

Runways
Direction	Length		Surface
Direction	ft	m	Surface
18/36	2,159	658	Turf
9/27	1,395	425	Turf

Statistics
- Aircraft operations (2023): 4,000
- Based aircraft (2024): 16
- Source: Federal Aviation Administration

Shiocton Airport (FAA LID: W34), is a privately owned public use airport located 1 mile (1.6 km) northeast of the central business district of Shiocton, a village in Outagamie County, Wisconsin, United States.

Although most U.S. airports use the same three-letter location identifier for the FAA and IATA, this airport is assigned W34 by the FAA but has no designation from the IATA.

The airport does not have scheduled airline service, the closest airport with scheduled airline service is Appleton International Airport, about 15 miles (24 km) south.

== Facilities and aircraft ==
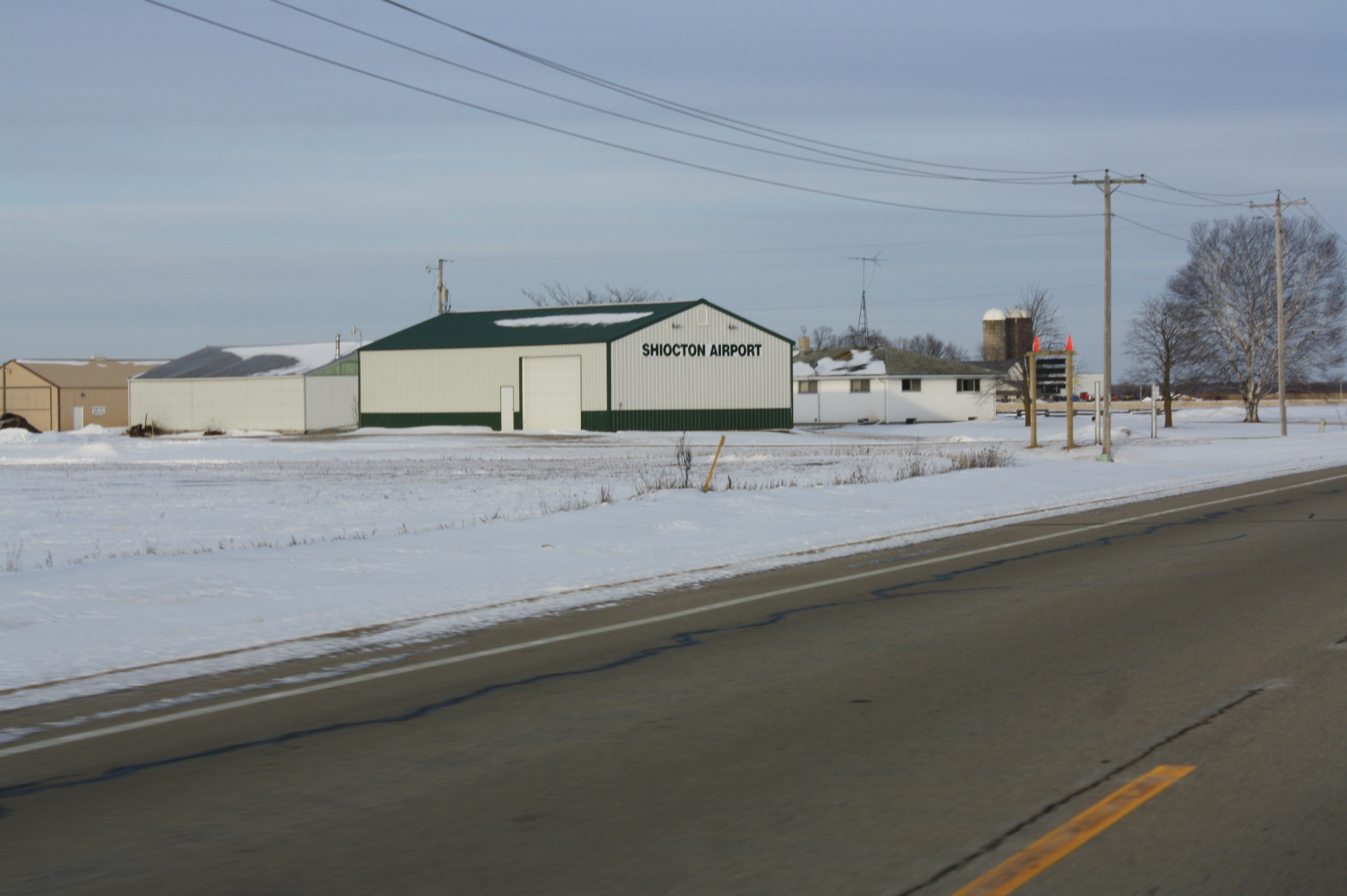
Facilities from WIS 54

Shiocton Airport covers an area of 45 acres (18 ha) at an elevation of 760 feet (232 m) above mean sea level. It has two runways: 18/36 is 2,159 by 110 feet (658 x 34 m) with a turf surface; 9/27 is 1,395 by 100 feet (425 x 30 m), also with a turf surface.

For the 12-month period ending September 14, 2023, the airport had 4,000 aircraft operations, an average of 11 per day: all general aviation. In July 2024, there were 16 aircraft based at this airport: 13 single-engine and 3 ultra-light.

== See also ==
- List of airports in Wisconsin
