= Bovina, Wisconsin =

- Town
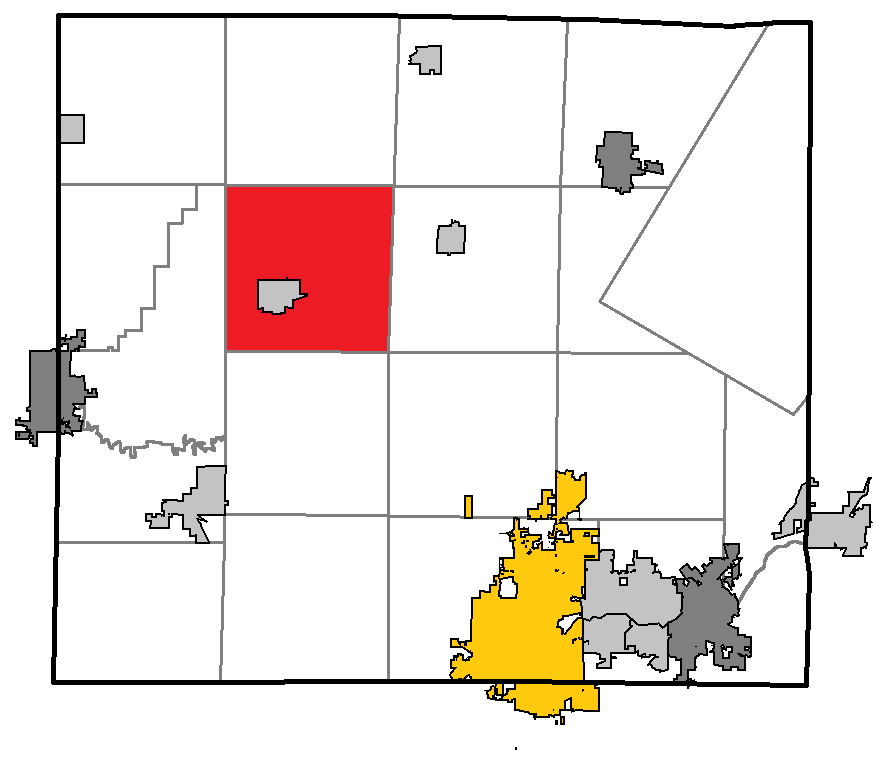
- Location of Bovina, within Outagamie County
- Coordinates: 44°27′26″N 88°33′43″W
- Country: United States
- State: Wisconsin
- County: Outagamie

Area
  - Total: 33.7 sq mi (87.4 km^{2})
  - Land: 33.7 sq mi (87.2 km^{2})
  - Water: 0.077 sq mi (0.2 km^{2})
- Elevation: 764 ft (233 m)

Population (2020)
  - Total: 1,153
  - Density: 34.2/sq mi (13.2/km^{2})
- Time zone: UTC-6 (Central (CST))
  - Summer (DST): UTC-5 (CDT)
- FIPS code: 55-08975
- GNIS feature ID: 1582846
- Website: https://tn.bovina.wi.gov/

Bovina is a town in Outagamie County, Wisconsin, United States. At the 2020 census, the town had a total population of 1,153. The village of Shiocton is located within the town.

== Geography ==
According to the United States Census Bureau, the town has a total area of 33.7 square miles (87.4 km^{2}), of which 33.7 square miles (87.2 km^{2}) is land and 0.1 square mile (0.2 km^{2}) (0.18%) is water.

== Demographics ==
At the 2020 census, there were 1,153 people and 402 households. There were 483 housing units. The racial makeup of the town was 1,078 White, 6 black or African descent, 1 American Indian, 11 Asian, 43 Hispanic, and 10 from some other races .

Of 402 households, 21.7% had children under the age of 18 living with their families, 69.7% had married couples living together, 7.5% had a female householder with no husband present, and 16.7% had a male householder with no female present. 13.5% of all households were made up of individuals 65 or older. The average family size was 2.99.

The Median Household Income was $77,917 and the Employment Rate was at 62.0%. Approximately 18.5% of residents have a Bachelor's Degree or Higher.

== Notable people ==
- Ervin Conradt, farmer and politician, was born in the town
