= Maine (village), Wisconsin =

Maine, Wisconsin
- Village
- Location of Village of Maine in Marathon County, Wisconsin.
- Coordinates: 45°1′50″N 89°40′20″W
- Country: United States
- State: Wisconsin
- County: Marathon
- incorporated: 2015

Area
  - Total: 43.81 sq mi (113.47 km^{2})
  - Land: 43.07 sq mi (111.56 km^{2})
  - Water: 0.74 sq mi (1.91 km^{2})
- Elevation: 1,273 ft (388 m)

Population (2020)
  - Total: 2,613
  - Density: 60.66/sq mi (23.42/km^{2})
- Time zone: UTC-6 (Central (CST))
  - Summer (DST): UTC-5 (CDT)
- Area codes: 715 & 534
- FIPS code: 55-48225
- GNIS feature ID: 1583630
- Website: villageofmaine.org

Maine is an incorporated village in Marathon County, Wisconsin, United States. It is part of the Wausau, Wisconsin Metropolitan Statistical Area. The population was 2,613 at the 2020 census. The unincorporated communities of Mount View and Taegesville are located partially within the village.

== History ==
Originally organized as a town in 1866, it was named for Uriah E. Maine. He was a county sheriff and surveyor in the early 1860s. In December 2015, Maine voted to become a village.

== Geography ==
According to the United States Census Bureau, the village has a total area of 42.4 square miles (109.8 km^{2}), of which 42.0 square miles (108.7 km^{2}) is land and 0.42 square miles (1.1 km^{2}), or 1.00%, is water.

== Demographics ==
Historical population
Census	Pop.	Note	%±
2000	2,407		—
2010	2,337		−2.9%
2020	2,613		11.8%
U.S. Decennial Census

At the 2000 census there were 2,407 people, 842 households, and 721 families residing in the former town. The population density was 56.8 people per square mile (21.9/km^{2}). There were 877 housing units at an average density of 20.7 per square mile (8.0/km^{2}). The racial makeup of the town was 98.46% White, 0.04% Native American, 1.25% Asian, 0.08% from other races, and 0.17% from two or more races. Hispanic or Latino of any race were 0.42%.

Of the 842 households 37.9% had children under the age of 18 living with them, 76.8% were married couples living together, 5.1% had a female householder with no husband present, and 14.3% were non-families. 10.8% of households were one person and 5.1% were one person aged 65 or older. The average household size was 2.86 and the average family size was 3.08.

The age distribution was 26.3% under the age of 18, 7.1% from 18 to 24, 27.5% from 25 to 44, 27.2% from 45 to 64, and 12.0% 65 or older. The median age was 39 years. For every 100 females, there were 101.9 males. For every 100 females age 18 and over, there were 101.9 males.

The median household income was $57,679, and the median family income was $62,176. Males had a median income of $38,625 versus $26,633 for females. The per capita income for the town was $23,787. About 0.7% of families and 0.6% of the population were below the poverty line, including 0.6% of those under age 18 and none of those age 65 or over.

== Village of Maine versus Town of Maine ==
in Outagamie County, there is also a Town of Maine, Wisconsin. In Wisconsin, villages and towns are distinct types of administrative units.

== Education ==
It is in the Wausau School District.
