= Nichols, Wisconsin =

- Village
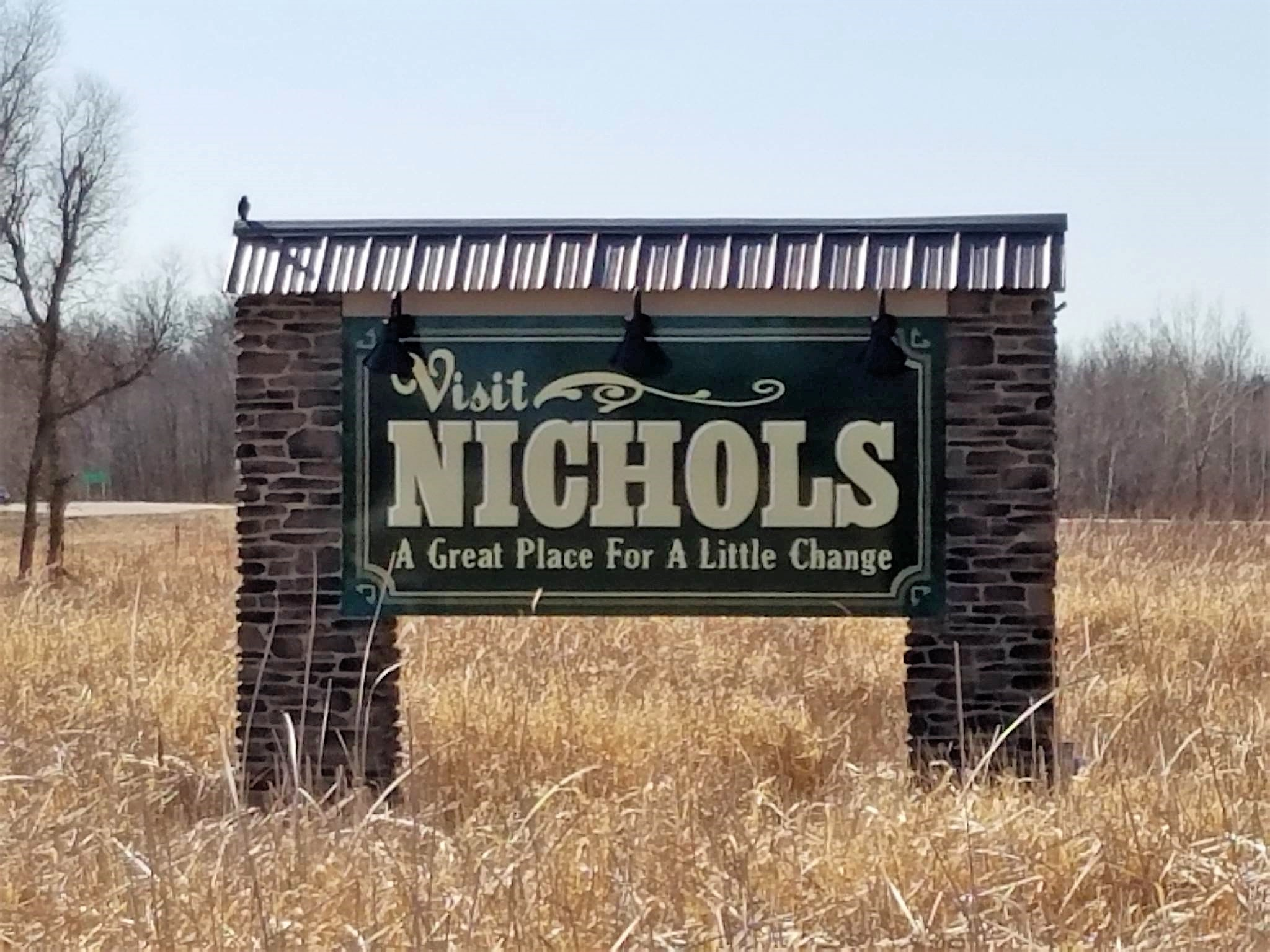
- Welcome sign along WIS 47
- Nickname: "Small in Numbers...Large in Spirit"
- Location of Nichols in Outagamie County, Wisconsin.
- Coordinates: 44°33′52″N 88°27′53″W
- Country: United States
- State: Wisconsin
- County: Outagamie

Area
  - Total: 0.88 sq mi (2.29 km^{2})
  - Land: 0.88 sq mi (2.29 km^{2})
  - Water: 0 sq mi (0.00 km^{2})
- Elevation: 791 ft (241 m)

Population (2020)
  - Total: 290
  - Density: 330/sq mi (130/km^{2})
- Time zone: UTC-6 (Central (CST))
  - Summer (DST): UTC-5 (CDT)
- Area code: 920
- FIPS code: 55-57375
- GNIS feature ID: 1570277
- Website: villageofnichols.com

Nichols is a village in Outagamie County, Wisconsin, United States. The population was 290 at the 2020 census.

== History ==
The village was named after Arthur L. Nichols, who established the town.

== Geography ==
Nichols is located at 44°33′52″N 88°27′53″W (44.564581, -88.464646).

According to the United States Census Bureau, the village has a total area of 0.86 square miles (2.23 km^{2}), all land.

== Demographics ==
Historical population
Census	Pop.	Note	%±
1970	207		—
1980	267		29.0%
1990	254		−4.9%
2000	307		20.9%
2010	273		−11.1%
2020	290		6.2%
U.S. Decennial Census

As of 2000 the median income for a household in the village was $36,042, and the median income for a family was $45,000. Males had a median income of $29,583 versus $25,893 for females. The per capita income for the village was $15,898. About 3.9% of families and 3.6% of the population were below the poverty line, including 3.2% of those under the age of eighteen and 11.1% of those 65 or over.

=== 2010 census ===
As of the census of 2010, there were 273 people, 112 households, and 69 families residing in the village. The population density was 317.4 inhabitants per square mile (122.5/km^{2}). There were 119 housing units at an average density of 138.4 per square mile (53.4/km^{2}). The racial makeup of the village was 95.2% White, 2.9% Native American, and 1.8% from other races. Hispanic or Latino of any race were 1.8% of the population.

There were 112 households, of which 33.9% had children under the age of 18 living with them, 48.2% were married couples living together, 9.8% had a female householder with no husband present, 3.6% had a male householder with no wife present, and 38.4% were non-families. 34.8% of all households were made up of individuals, and 8.1% had someone living alone who was 65 years of age or older. The average household size was 2.44 and the average family size was 3.13.

The median age in the village was 33.5 years. 26.7% of residents were under the age of 18; 9.1% were between the ages of 18 and 24; 28.3% were from 25 to 44; 26.8% were from 45 to 64; and 9.2% were 65 years of age or older. The gender makeup of the village was 54.9% male and 45.1% female.

== Images ==
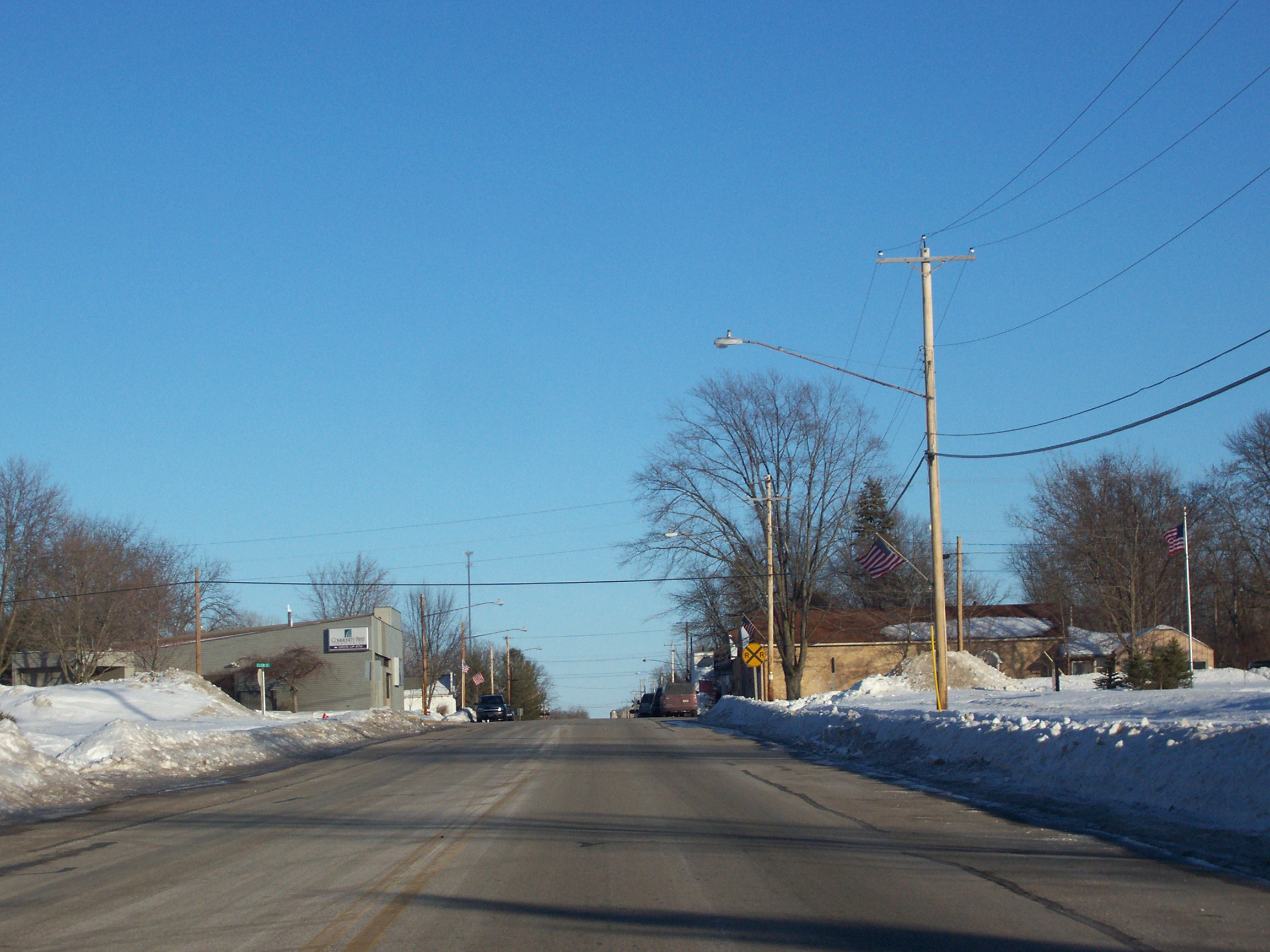
Downtown Nichols

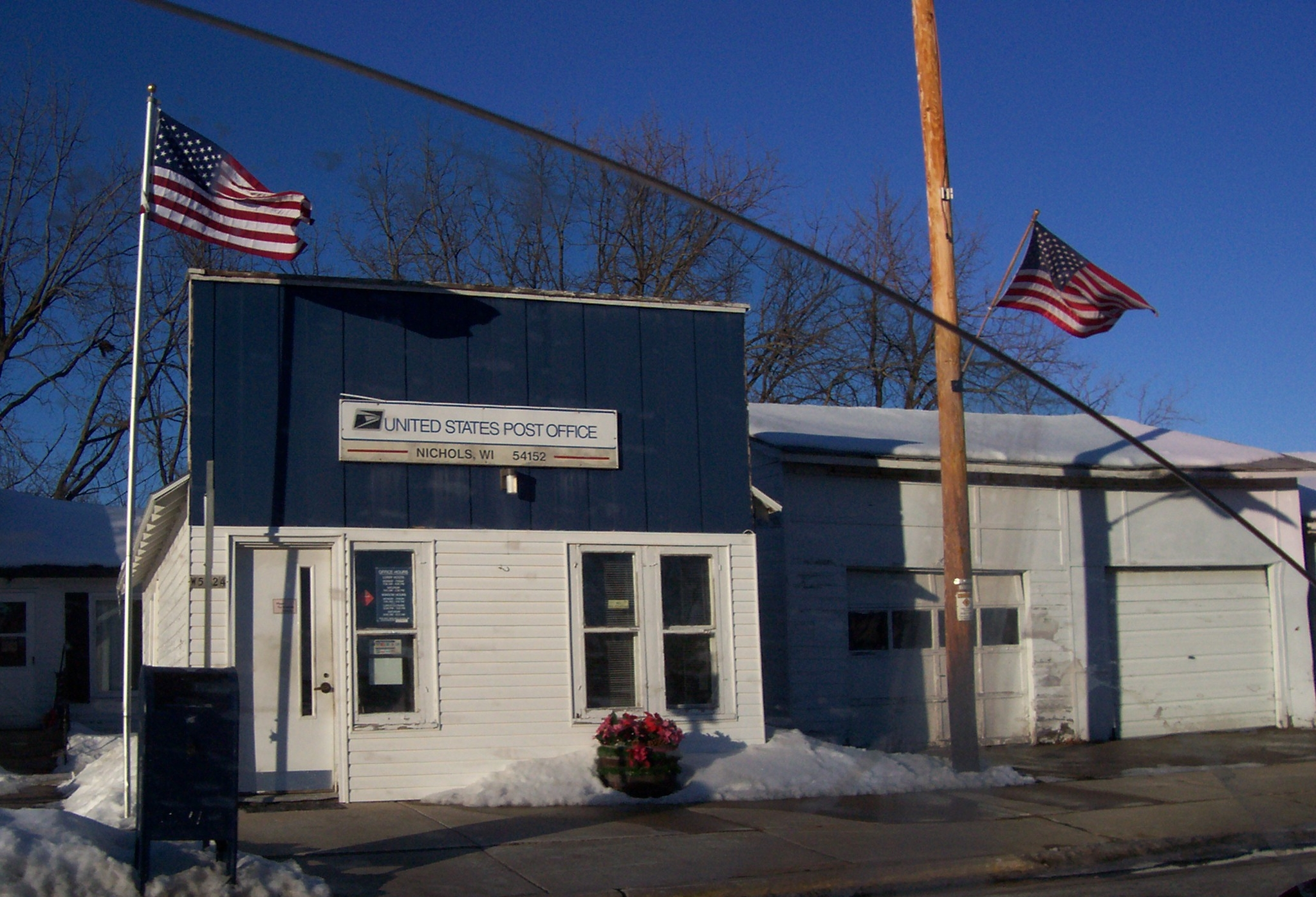
Post office

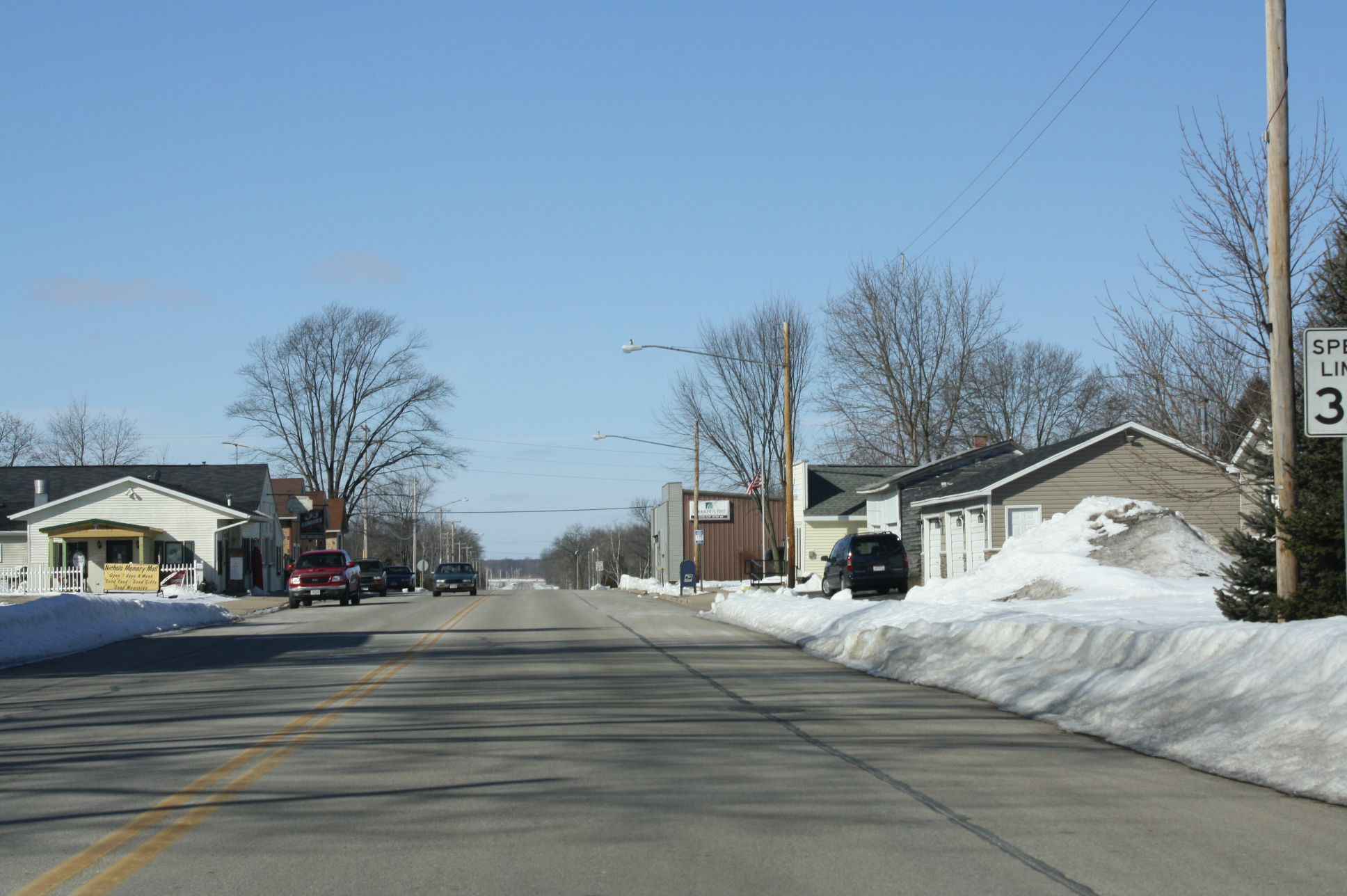
Looking west in Nichols

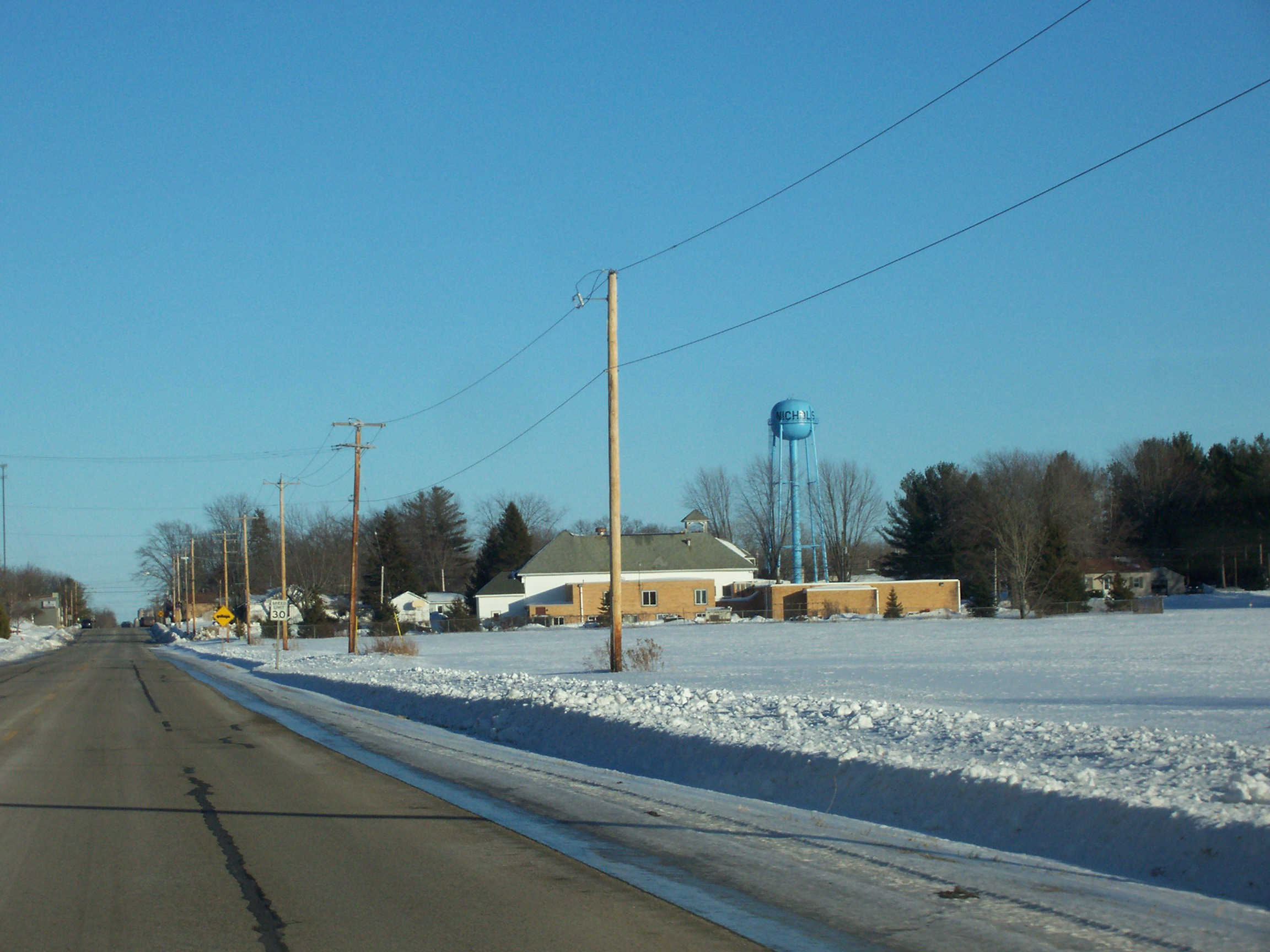
Skyline
