= Navarino, Wisconsin =

- Town
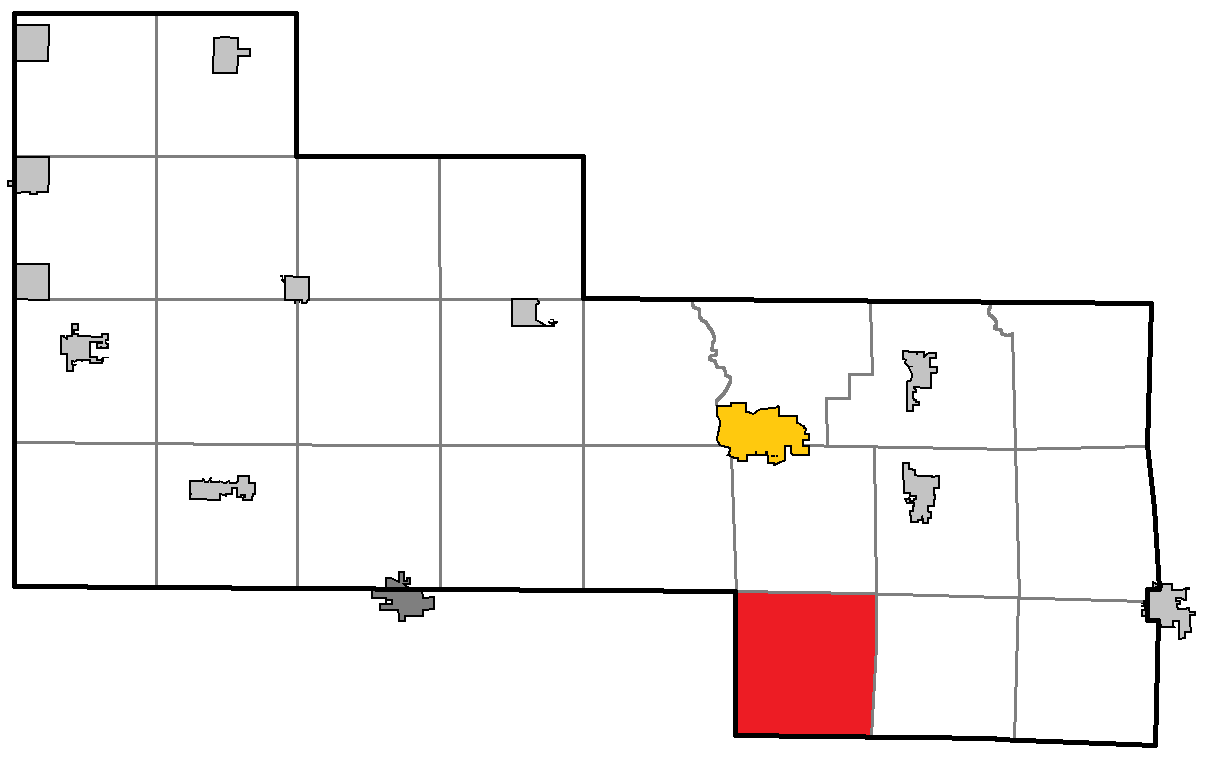
- Location of Navarino, within Shawano County
- Coordinates: 44°37′56″N 88°32′56″W
- Country: United States
- State: Wisconsin
- County: Shawano

Area
  - Total: 35.8 sq mi (92.6 km^{2})
  - Land: 35.3 sq mi (91.3 km^{2})
  - Water: 0.50 sq mi (1.3 km^{2})
- Elevation: 801 ft (244 m)

Population (2020)
  - Total: 413
  - Density: 11.7/sq mi (4.52/km^{2})
- Time zone: UTC-6 (Central (CST))
  - Summer (DST): UTC-5 (CDT)
- FIPS code: 55-55675
- GNIS feature ID: 1583781
- Website: https://townofnavarino.org/

Navarino is a town in Shawano County, Wisconsin, United States. As of the 2020 census, its population is 413. For statistical purposes, the United States Census Bureau has defined Navarino as a census-designated place (CDP). The census-designated place and community of Navarino is located in the town.

== History ==
The town of Navarino, if not founded by that name, had its name changed from Mayville on December 1, 1874. The town seems to have been named after the Battle of Navarino fought on October 20, 1827, between the Ottoman Empire and a combined British, Russian and French navy.

== Geography ==
According to the United States Census Bureau, the town has a total area of 35.7 square miles (92.6 km^{2}), of which 35.2 square miles (91.3 km^{2}) is land and 0.5 square mile (1.3 km^{2}) (1.40%) is water.

== Demographics ==
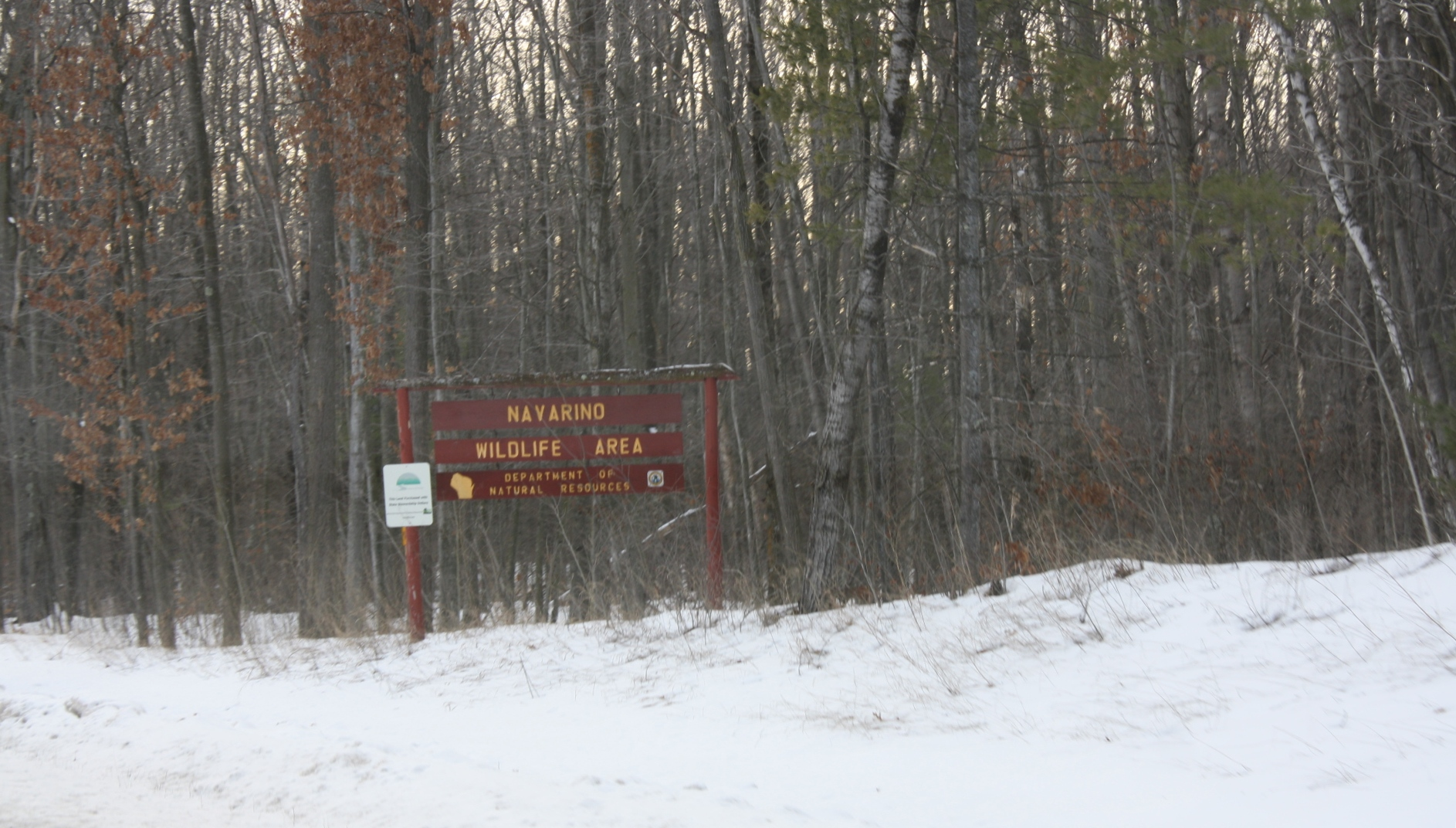
Navarino Wildlife Area

As of the census of 2000, there were 422 people, 177 households, and 121 families residing in the town. The population density was 12.0 people per square mile (4.6/km^{2}). There were 195 housing units at an average density of 5.5 per square mile (2.1/km^{2}). The racial makeup of the town was 98.10% White, 0.24% Native American, 0.95% Asian, and 0.71% from two or more races. Hispanic or Latino of any race were 0.24% of the population.

There were 177 households, out of which 30.5% had children under the age of 18 living with them, 65.0% were married couples living together, 2.8% had a female householder with no husband present, and 31.1% were non-families. 30.5% of all households were made up of individuals, and 11.3% had someone living alone who was 65 years of age or older. The average household size was 2.38 and the average family size was 2.98.

In the town, the population was spread out, with 23.0% under the age of 18, 5.9% from 18 to 24, 30.1% from 25 to 44, 28.2% from 45 to 64, and 12.8% who were 65 years of age or older. The median age was 42 years. For every 100 females, there were 101.0 males. For every 100 females age 18 and over, there were 99.4 males.

The median income for a household in the town was $47,750, and the median income for a family was $56,875. Males had a median income of $35,417 versus $25,347 for females. The per capita income for the town was $21,026. None of the families and 1.5% of the population were living below the poverty line, including no under eighteens and 3.3% of those over 64.
