= Cicero (disambiguation) =

Cicero (106–43 BC), full name Marcus Tullius Cicero, was a Roman statesman, lawyer, political theorist, philosopher and one of Rome's greatest orators.

Cicero may also refer to:

== Places in the United States ==
- Cicero, Illinois, a town
  - Illinois Route 50 (Cicero Avenue), a north–south street in Chicago, Illinois
  - Cicero station (CTA Blue Line), in Chicago, Illinois
  - Cicero station (CTA Green Line), in Chicago, Illinois
  - Cicero station (CTA Pink Line), in Cicero, Illinois
  - Cicero station (Metra), in Cicero, Illinois
- Cicero, Indiana, a town
- Cicero, Kansas, an unincorporated community
- Cicero, New York, a town
- Cicero, Ohio, a former town
- Cicero, Wisconsin, a town
  - Cicero (community), Wisconsin, an unincorporated community
- Cicero Township, Illinois
- Cicero Township, Indiana
- Cicero Peak (South Dakota), a mountain
- Cicero Creek (Indiana)
- Cicero Creek (Missouri)

== Ships ==
- List of ships named Cicero
- HMS Cicero (F170), a Second World War infantry landing ship
- HMS Cicero (1918), a 24-class minesweeping sloop

== People ==
- Cícero (given name), a list of people
- Cicero (surname), a list of people
- Quintus Tullius Cicero (died 43 BC), younger brother of Marcus Tullius Cicero who served in government as an author
- Cicero Minor (65 BC–on or after 28 BC), son of Marcus Tullius Cicero and Roman consul
- John Cicero, Elector of Brandenburg (1455–1499), posthumously given the cognomen Cicero
- Cicero, code name for Elyesa Bazna (1904–1970), Albanian secret agent for Germany during World War II
- Jimmy Cicero, ring name of American professional wrestler Matthew Bowman (born 1969)
- David Cicero, a Scottish-American singer and keyboardist

== Fictional characters ==
- Marcus Tullius Cicero (Rome character)
- Paul Cicero, in the film Goodfellas
- Cicero Pig, in Porky Pig films
- Cicero, in the film Gladiator
- Cicero, in the comic strip Mutt and Jeff
- Cicero, in the video game The Elder Scrolls V: Skyrim
- Uncle Jimmy "Cicero" Kalinowski, in the TV series The Bear

== Other uses ==
- Cicero (horse) (1902–1923), British Thoroughbred racehorse
- Cicero (magazine), a German political magazine
- Cicero (typography), a unit of measure in typesetting used in France and several other countries
- 9446 Cicero, an asteroid
- Cicero: The Philosophy of a Roman Sceptic, 2015 book by Raphael Woolf
- Cicero Stadium, a sports stadium in Asmara, Eritrea
- Cicero Stadium (Illinois), a sports stadium in Cicero, Illinois, United States
- Centre for International Climate and Environmental Research, a research centre in Oslo, Norway
- CICERO-6, a low-orbit observation satellite

== See also ==
- Cicerone (disambiguation)
- Commonwealth Scientific and Industrial Research Organisation
