= Cicerone (disambiguation) =

Cicerone is an archaic term for a guide.

Cicerone may refer also to:

== Places ==
- Cicerone, West Virginia, United States
- Cicerone Field, a baseball field in Irvine, California, United States

== Occupations ==
- Museum docent, a museum guide
- An American trademarked term for beer sommelier, a professional beer server
- Bear-leader (guide), a travel guide for young men of rank or wealth

== Other ==
- Cicerone Press, English publisher
- Ralph J. Cicerone, American academic
- VV Cicerone, a Surinamese association football club founded in 1929
- Cicerone Manolache, Romanian footballer and manager
- Cicerone Theodorescu, Romanian poet
- Russell Cicerone, American soccer player

== See also ==
- Cicero (disambiguation)
- Tullia, daughter of Cicero
