= Prince Eugen, Duke of Närke =

Swedish prince (1865–1947)

Prince Eugen
- Duke of Närke
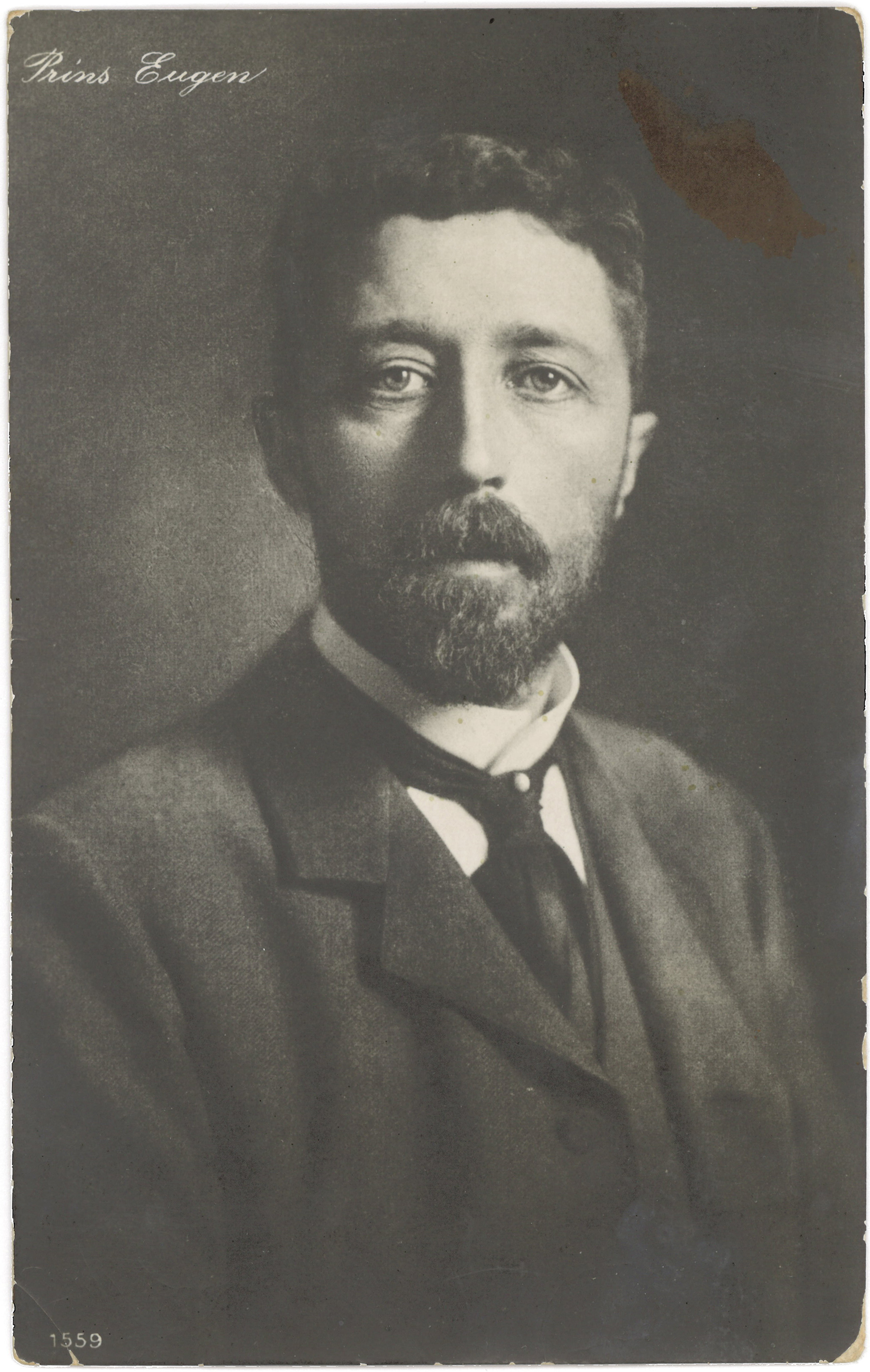
- Photograph of Prince Eugen, c. 1911
- Born: 1 August 1865; Drottningholm Palace, Stockholm, Sweden
- Died: 17 August 1947 (aged 82); Drottningholm Palace, Stockholm, Sweden
Names
- Eugen Napoleon Nicolaus
- House: Bernadotte
- Father: Oscar II
- Mother: Sophia of Nassau

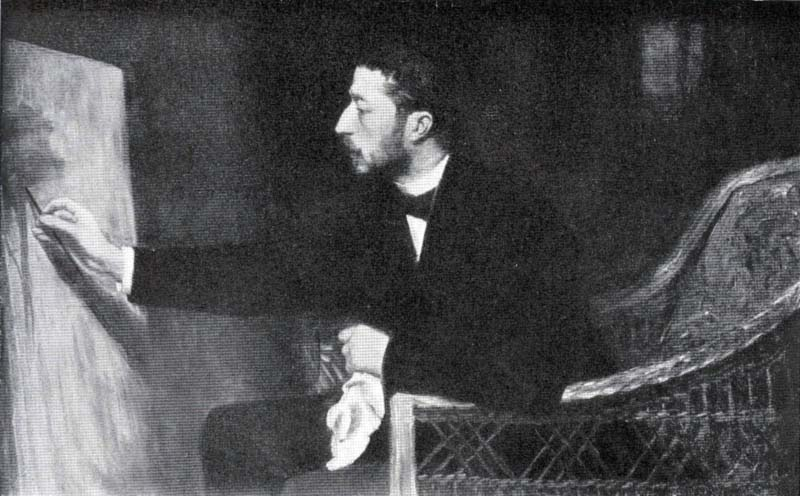
Prince Eugen painting. By Oscar Björck, c. 1905

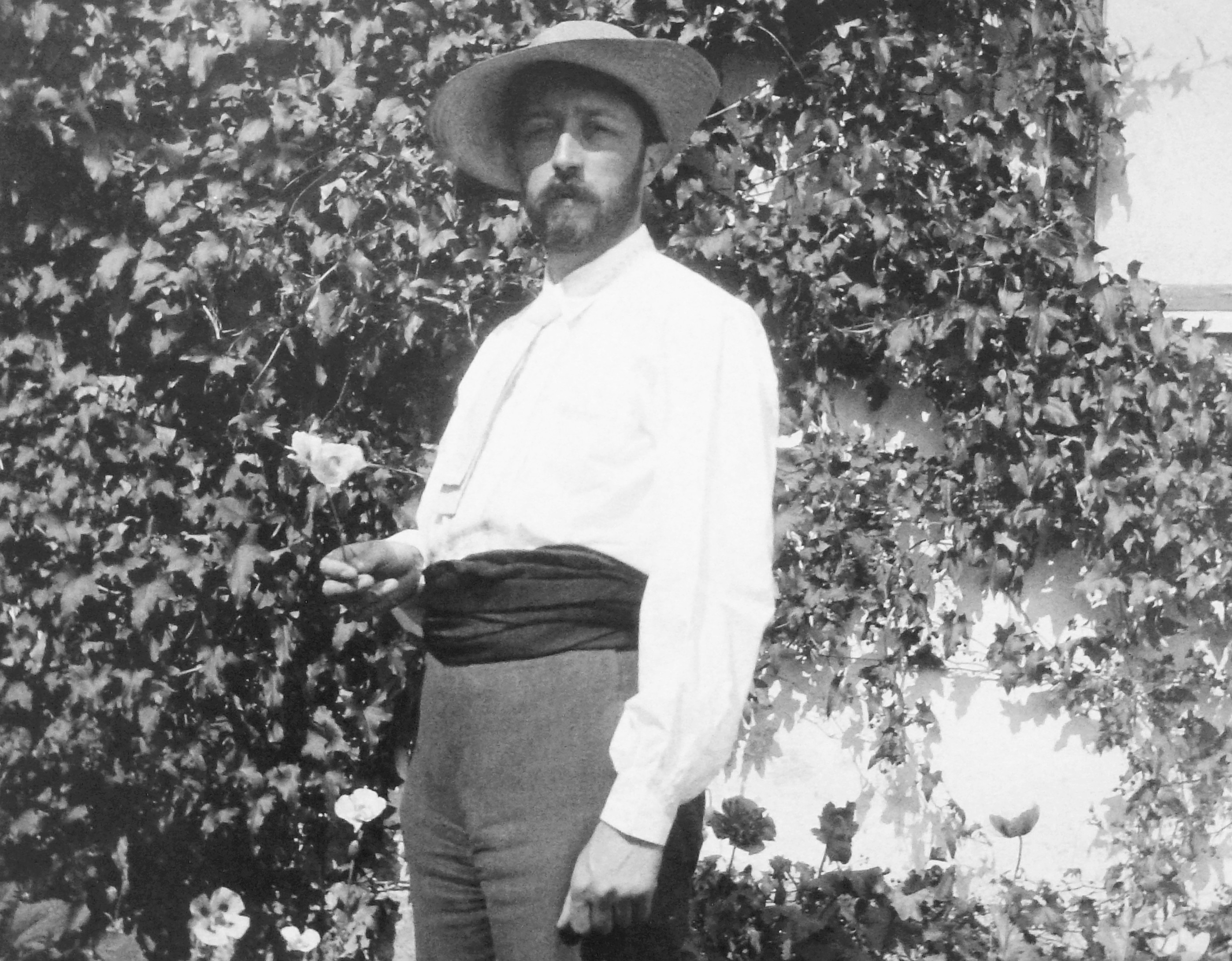
Prince Eugen, 1900.

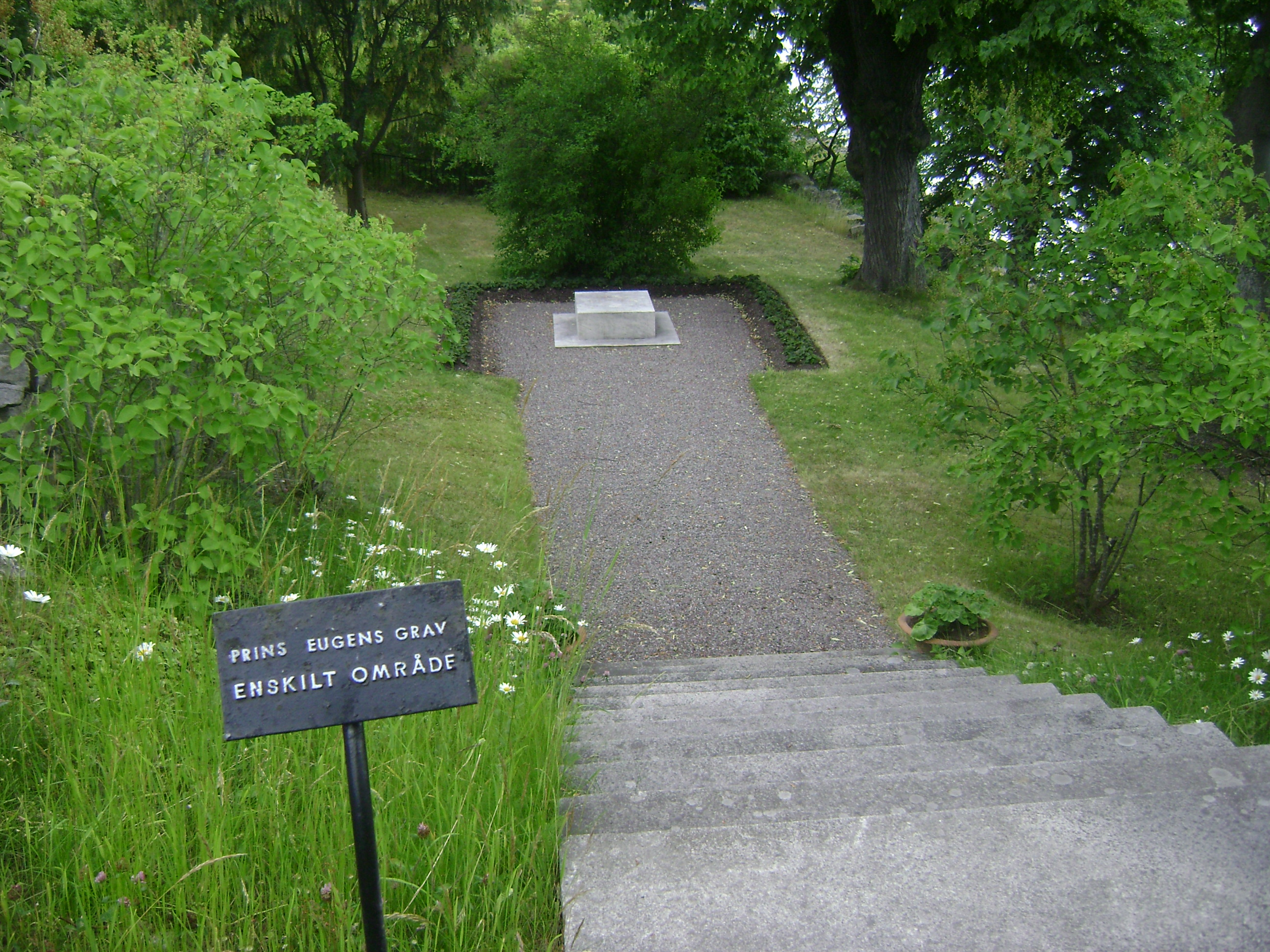
Prince Eugen's grave at Waldemarsudde.

Prince Eugen, Duke of Närke (Eugen Napoleon Nicolaus; 1 August 1865 – 17 August 1947) was a Swedish prince, who was a noted artist, art collector, and patron. He was the youngest son of King Oscar II and Sofia of Nassau.

Following his military training, Prince Eugen focused entirely on art, studying in Paris and helping pioneer the national Swedish landscape painting style of the 1890s. He became renowned for evocative landscapes, as well as monumental public murals for the Royal Opera, the Royal Dramatic Theatre, and Stockholm City Hall.

In 1899, he purchased the Waldemarsudde estate on Djurgården, which served as his home and studio. On his 80th birthday in 1945, King Gustaf V established the Prince Eugen Medal to honor outstanding artistic achievements. Upon his death in 1947, Eugen bequeathed his estate and collection of art to the state, and it opened as a public museum in 1948.

== Background ==
Prince Eugen was born at Drottningholm Palace as the fourth and youngest son of Prince Oscar, Duke of Östergötland. His mother was Sophia of Nassau. The newborn prince was granted the title of Duke of Närke. Upon his father's accession to the thrones of Sweden and Norway as King Oscar II, the Duke of Närke became fourth in line to the throne. Showing early artistic promise, he studied in Paris, and went on to become one of Sweden's most prominent landscape painters. Throughout his life Prince Eugen was a supporter of fellow artists, and also involved in many cultural organisations and committees. A homosexual bachelor, he bequeathed his villa Waldemarsudde at Djurgården in Stockholm, and its collections, to the nation. It is now one of Sweden's most popular museums.

== Norway ==
The Duke of Närke was a great admirer of Norwegian nature and frequently visited Christiania (later known as Oslo). His letters show that he preferred its artistic milieu to the more constrained Stockholm one. His most notable Norwegian friends were the painters Erik Werenskiold and Gerhard Munthe; he remained attached to them and to Norway until his death.

In 1905, the personal union between Norway and Sweden was broken by the Parliament of Norway. The writer Bjørnstjerne Bjørnson mentioned the possible candidature of Prince Eugen for the throne of Norway. Another writer, Knut Hamsun, had suggested the Prince as a suitable candidate already in 1893. His father, however, refused to allow any of his sons to ascend the Norwegian throne.

Prince Eugen was the only Swede represented at an exhibition in Oslo in 1904. The explanation was that he was a prince of Norway until 1905 and that his relations with the Norwegian artists caused him to be seen as Norwegian until the dissolution of the union.

== Art ==
After finishing high school, Prince Eugen studied art history at Uppsala University. Although supported by his parents, Prince Eugen did not make the decision to pursue a career in painting easily, not least because of his royal status. He was very open-minded and interested in the radical tendencies of the 1880s. He was first trained in painting by Hans Gude and Wilhelm von Gegerfelt.

Between 1887 and 1889, he studied in Paris under Léon Bonnat, Alfred Philippe Roll, Henri Gervex and Pierre Puvis de Chavannes. When he arrived, the Finnish artist Albert Edelfelt became his cicerone in the studios and at the exhibitions in Paris - a close friendship between Eugene and Edelfelt arose. Puvis de Chavannes's classical simplicity had the greatest influence on Prince Eugen's work. The Duke devoted himself entirely to landscape painting, becoming one of the era's most prominent landscape painters. He was mainly interested in the lake Mälaren, the countryside of Stockholm (such as Tyresö, where he spent his summers), Västergötland (most notably Örgården, another summer residence) and Skåne (especially Österlen).

=== Prince Eugen's works ===
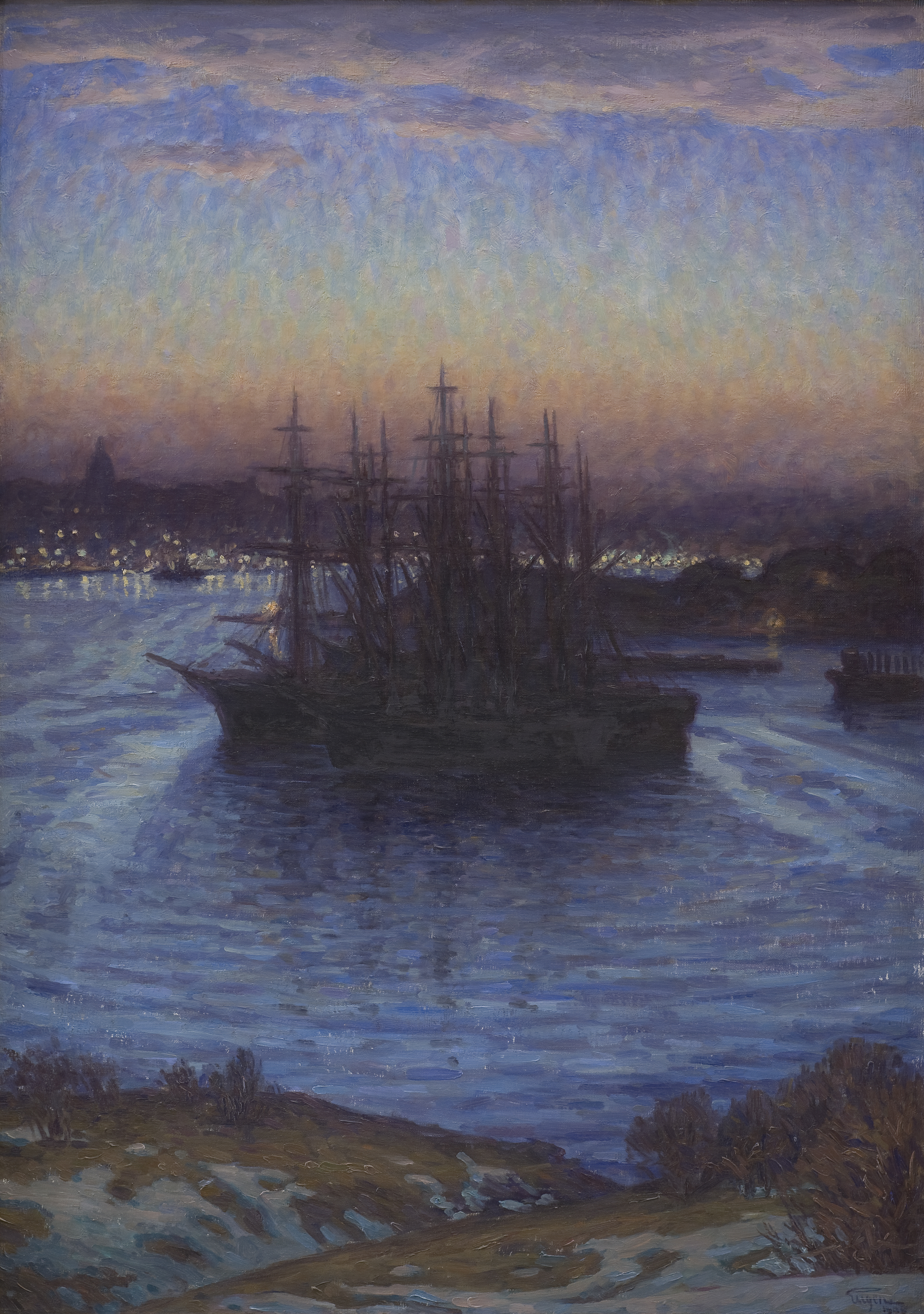
Painting of anchored ships

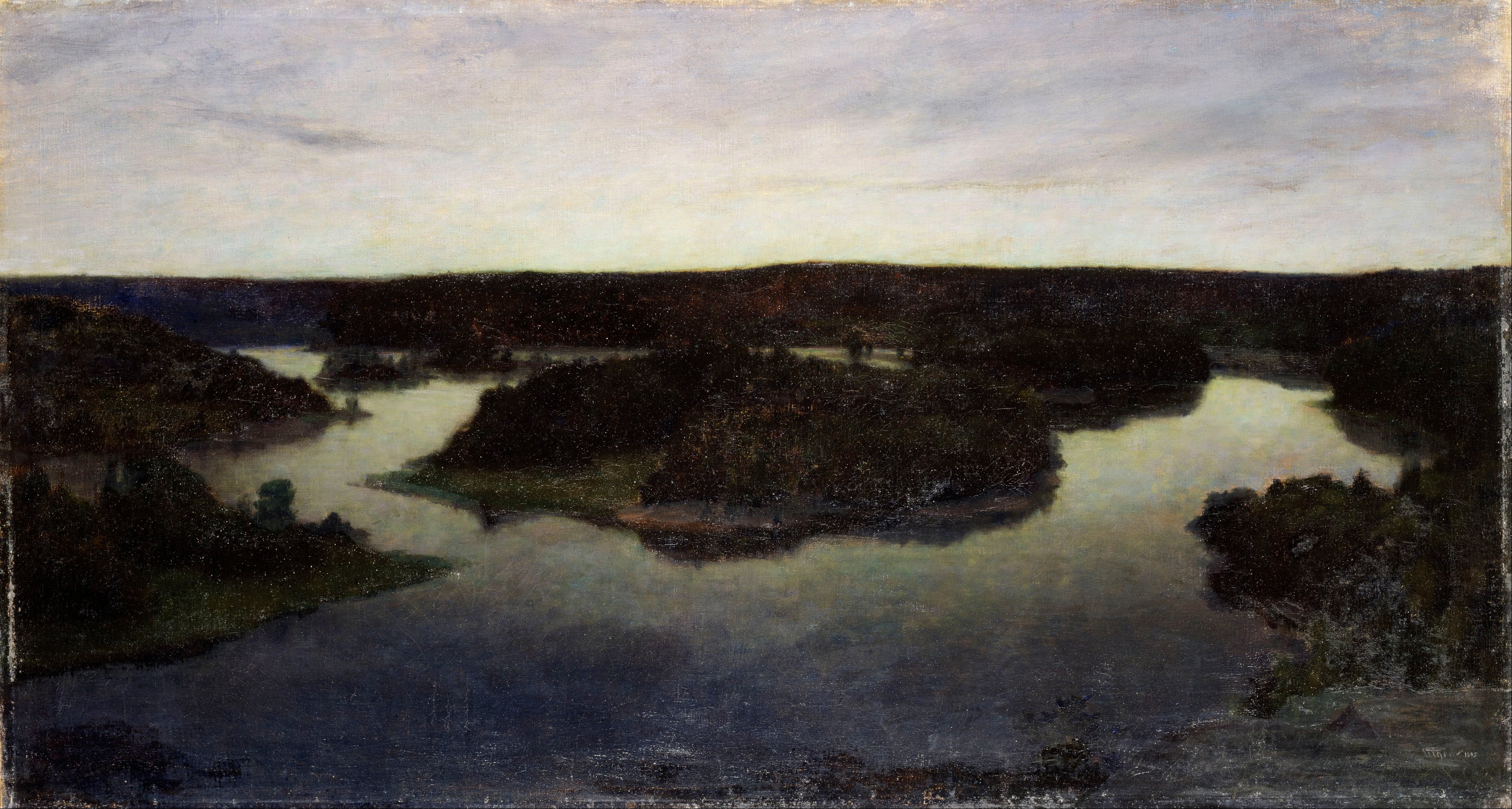
A Summer Night at Tyresö. 1895. 78 × 144 cm. Nationalmuseum, Stockholm.

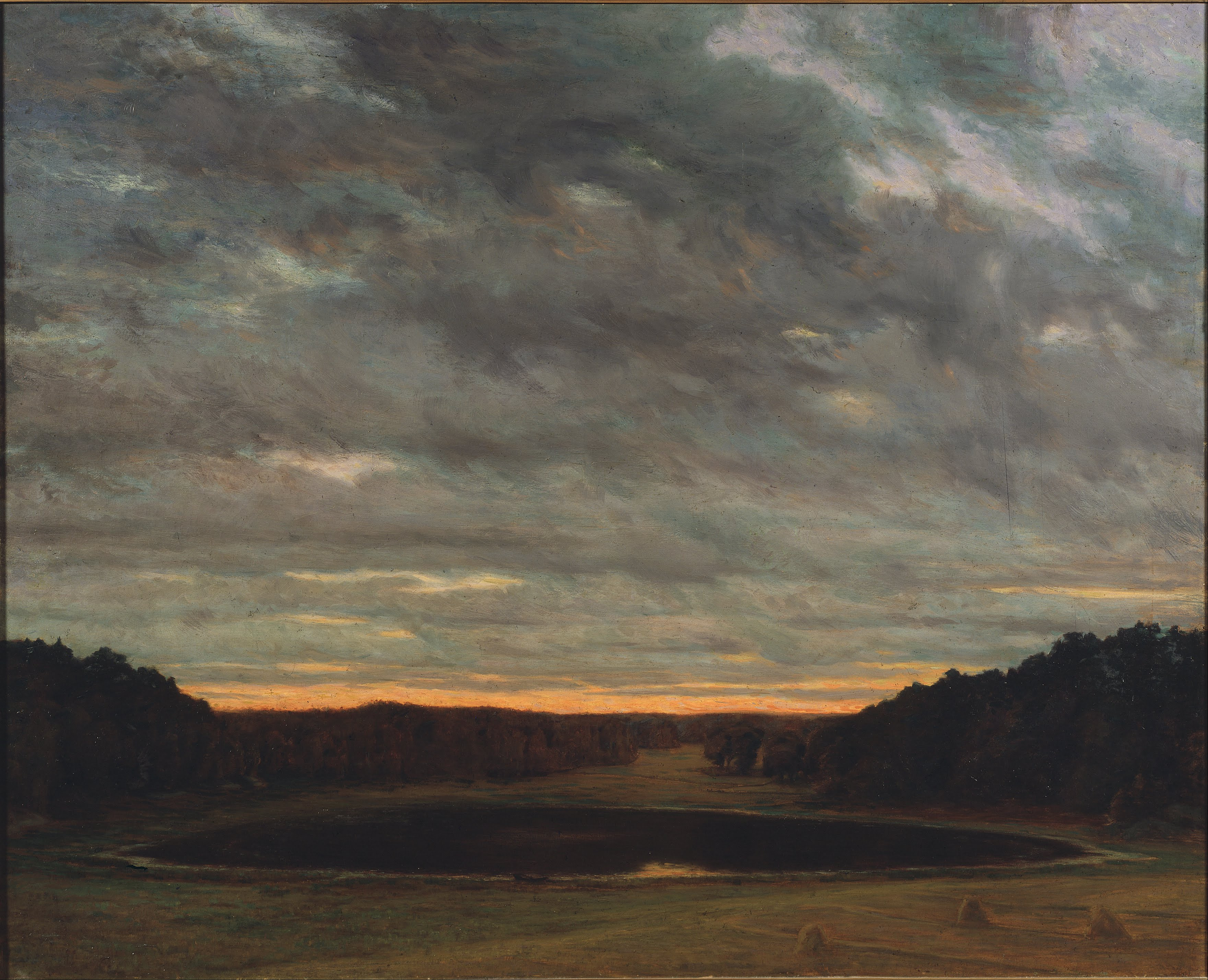
Calm Water. 1901. 142 × 178 cm. Nationalmuseum, Stockholm.

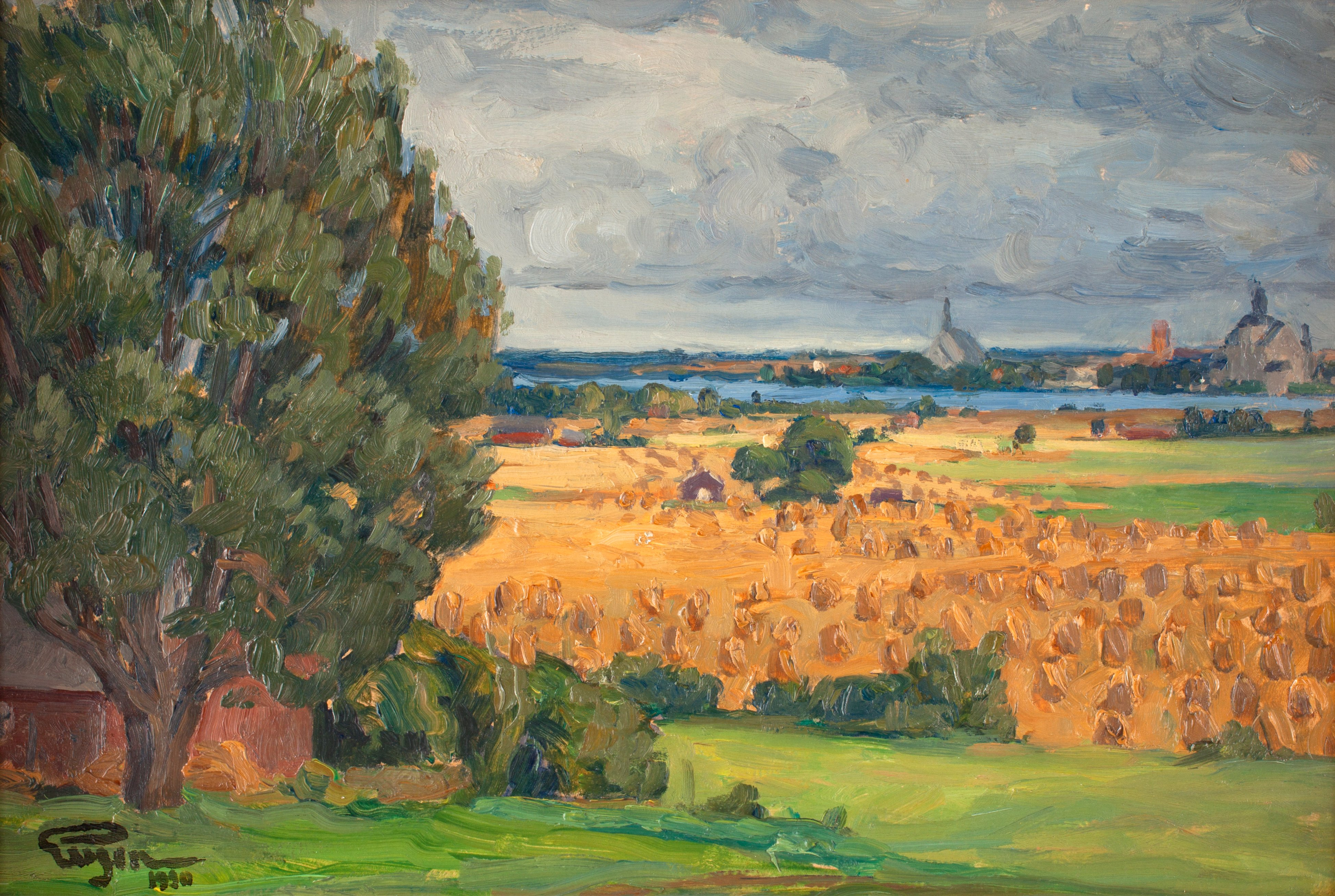
View of Vadstena from the surrounding fields

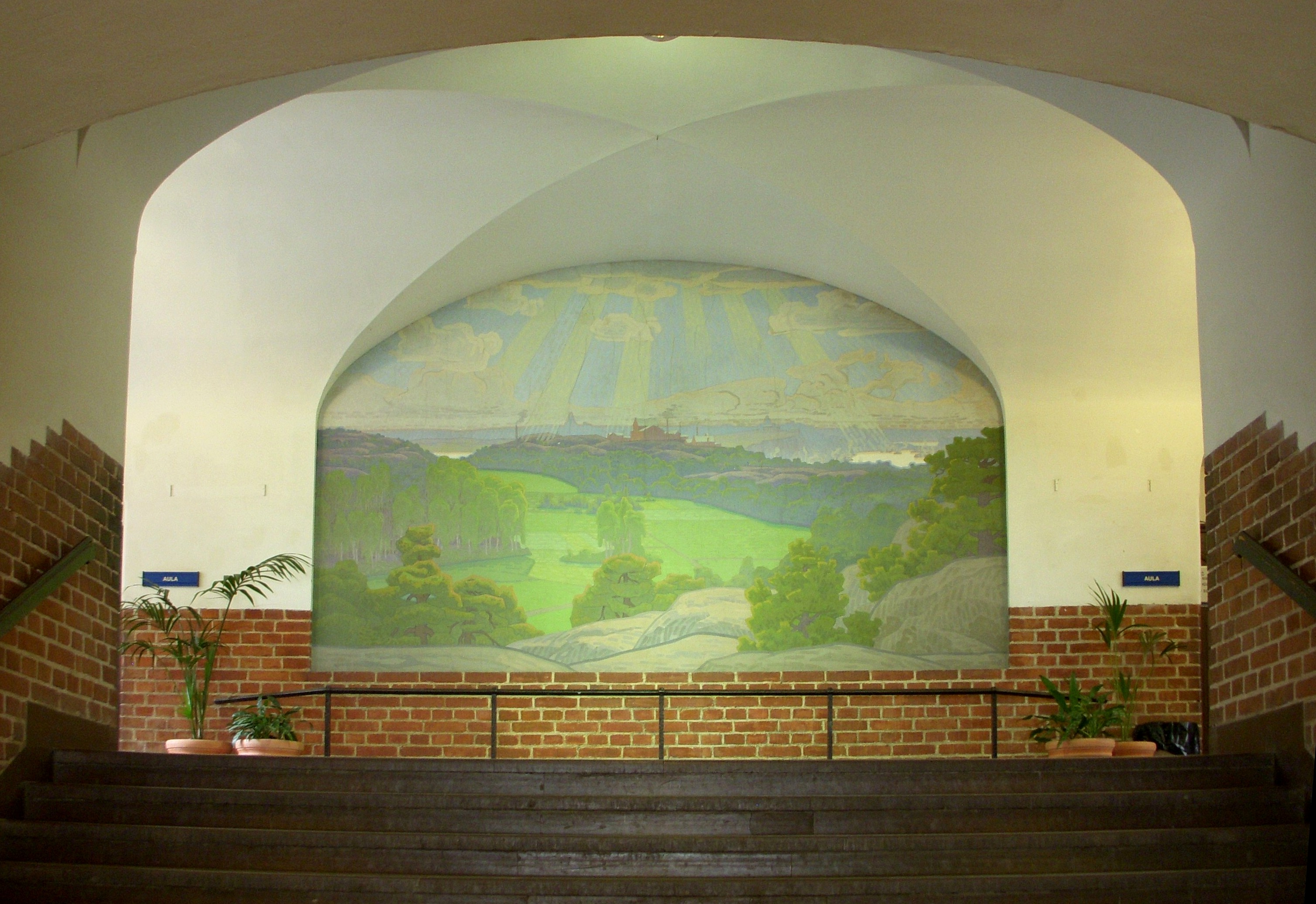
Östra Reals gymnasium

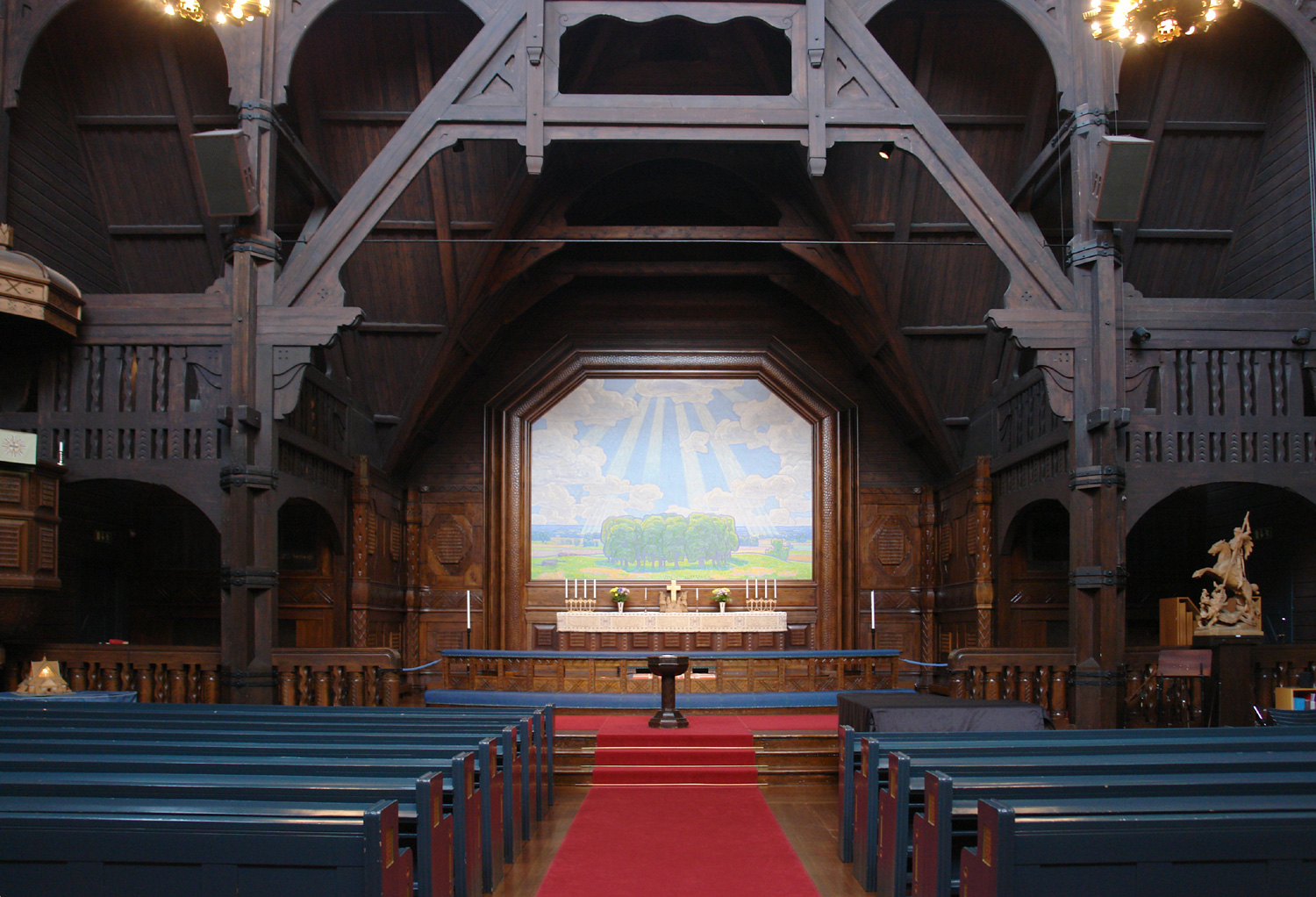
Kiruna Church, altarpiece

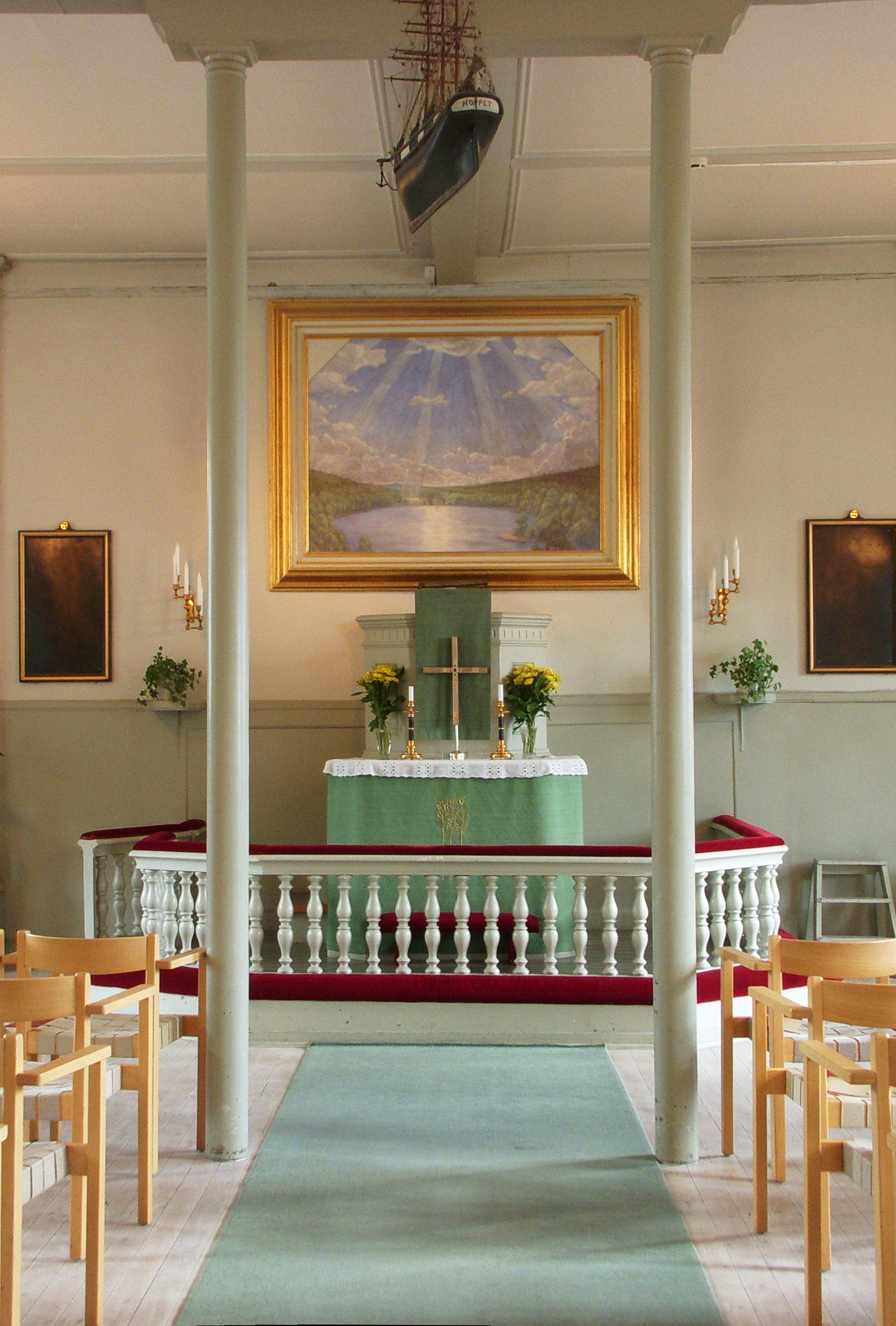
Djurgård Church

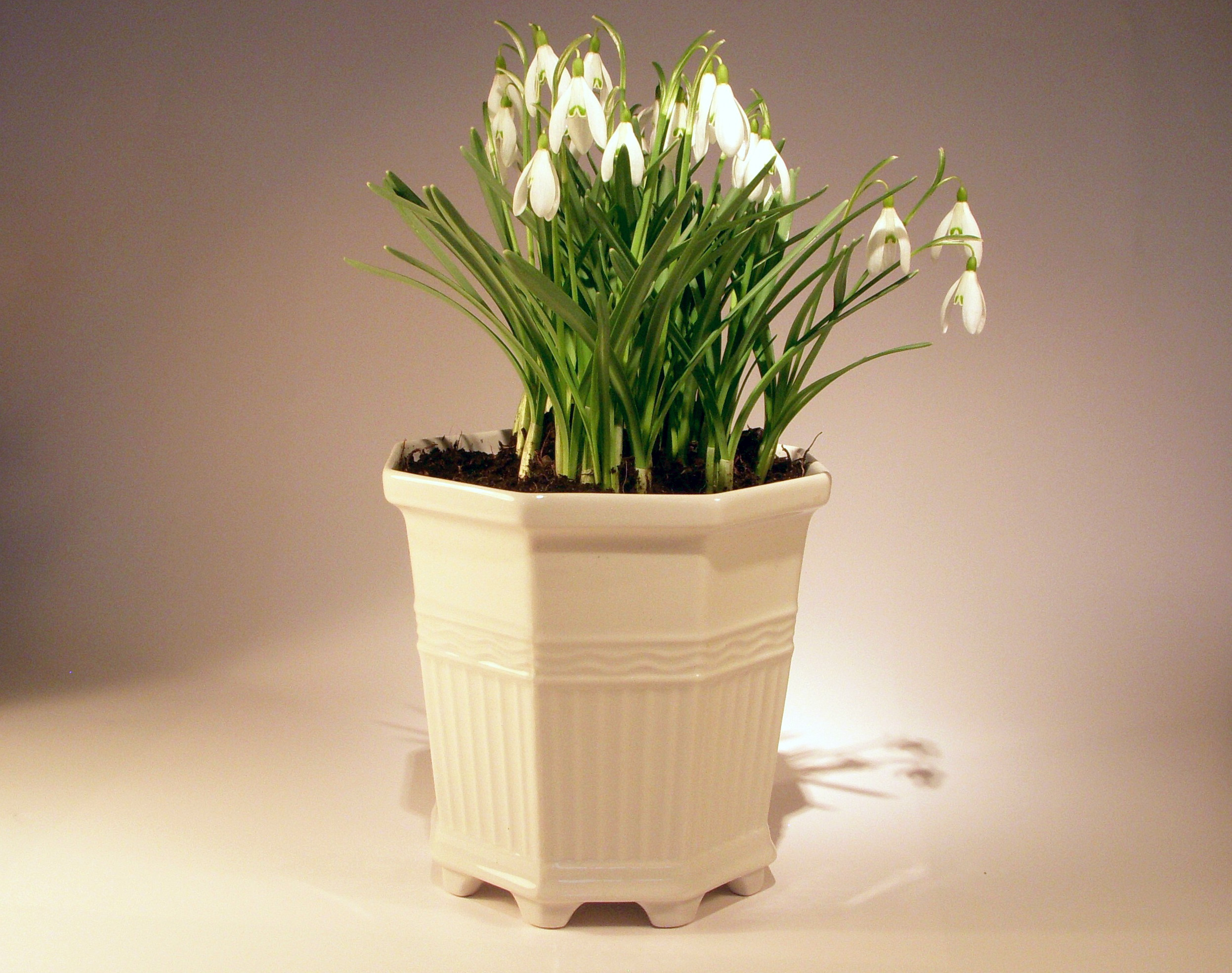
Porcelain flower pot designed by Prince Eugen, popular in Sweden.

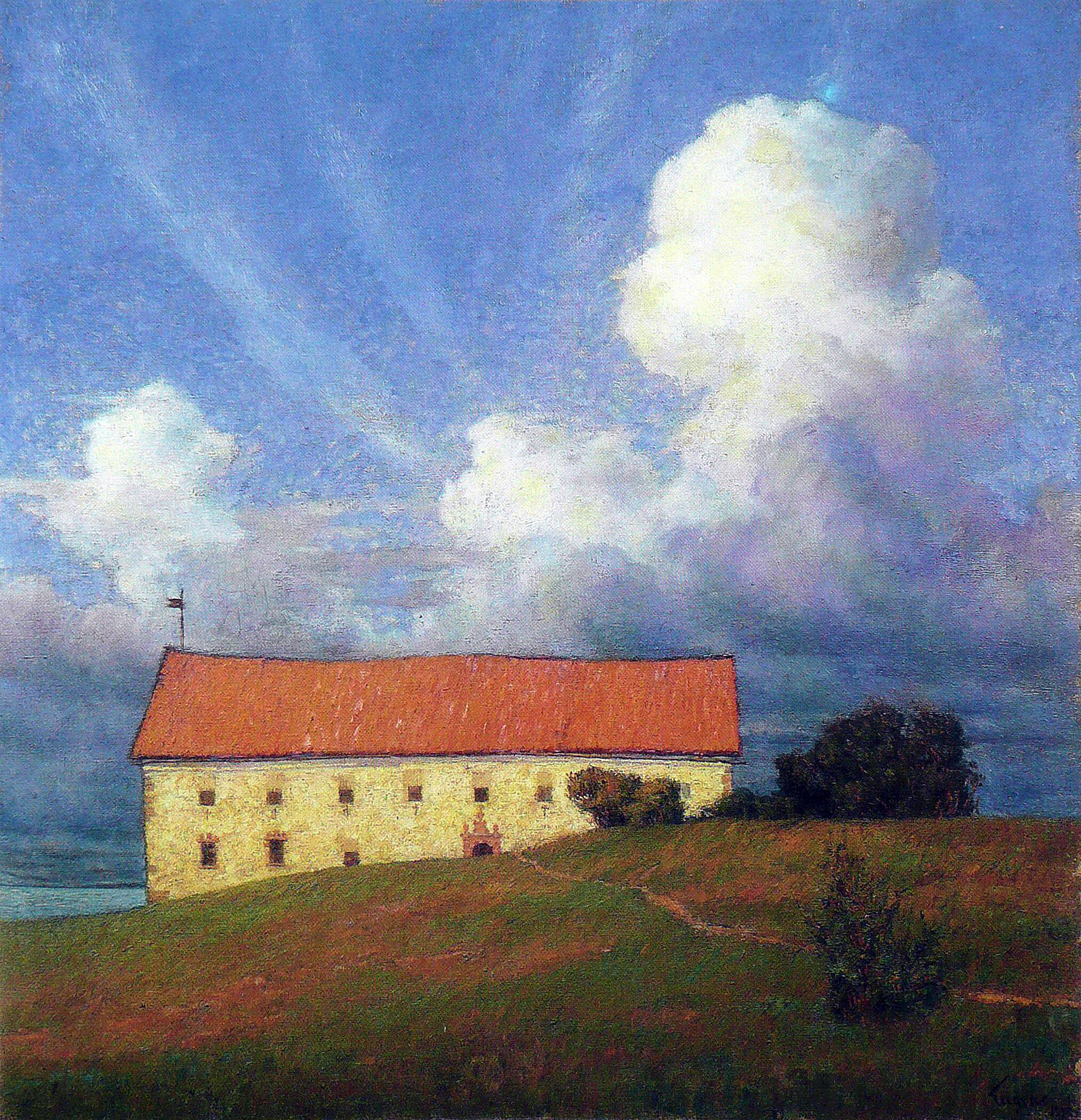
The old castle (1893)

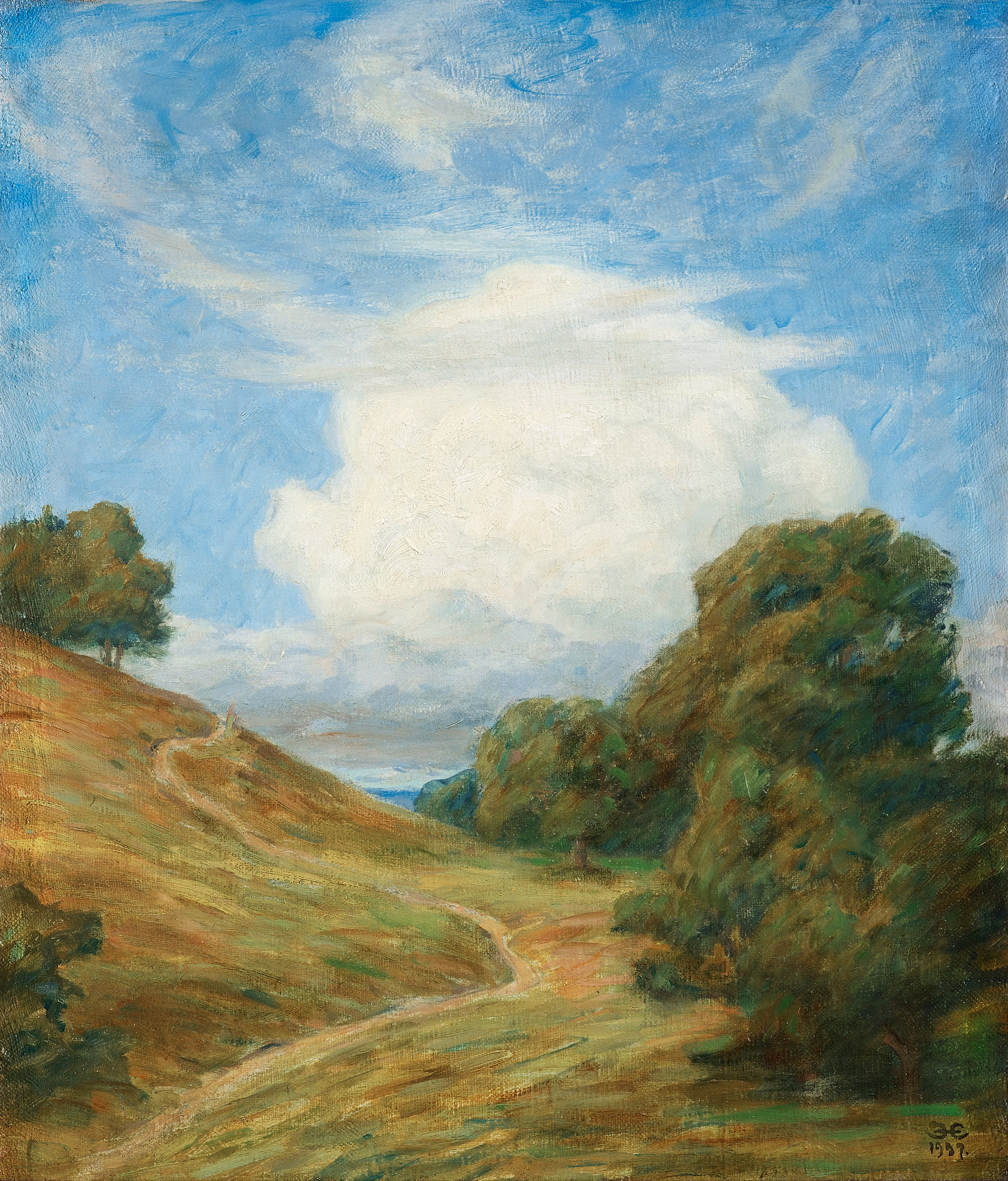
The Cloud (1927)

== Death and legacy ==
Prince Eugen bought Waldemarsudde, in Djurgården in Stockholm, in 1899 and had a residence built there within a few years. After his death at Drottningholm Palace on 17 August 1947, the residence became an art museum and, in accordance with his will, property of the state. Eugen never married, in an era when royal princes almost always found princesses to wed. His homosexual orientation was unknown to the general public.

== Honours and arms ==
=== Honours ===
National honours

- Knight and Commander of the Seraphim, 1 August 1865
- Knight of the Order of Charles XIII, 1 August 1865
- Commander Grand Cross of the Sword, 1 August 1865
- Commander Grand Cross of the Polar Star, 1 August 1865
- Commander Grand Cross of the Order of Vasa, 15 May 1897

Foreign honours

- Norway:
  - Knight of the Norwegian Lion, 21 January 1904
  - Grand Cross of St. Olav, with Collar
- Denmark: Knight of the Elephant, 31 August 1883
- (Austria-Hungary) Austro-Hungarian Imperial and Royal Family: Grand Cross of St. Stephen, 1890
- (Thailand) Siam: Knight of the Order of the Royal House of Chakri, 13 July 1897
- Spain:
  - Knight of the Golden Fleece, 15 May 1902
  - Grand Cross of the Order of Charles III, with Collar, 30 May 1906
- United Kingdom: Honorary Grand Cross of the Royal Victorian Order, 15 June 1905
- Belgium: Grand Cordon of the Order of Leopold
- Finland: Grand Cross of the White Rose
- France: Grand Cross of the Legion of Honour
- (Greece) Greek Royal Family: Grand Cross of the Redeemer
- (German Empire) German Imperial and Royal Family:
  - Knight of the Black Eagle, 2 July 1890
  - Grand Cross of the Red Eagle
  - (Grand Duchy of Baden) Baden Grand Ducal Family:
    - Knight of the House Order of Fidelity, 1881
    - Knight of the Order of Berthold the First, 1881
  - (Duchy of Nassau) Nassau Ducal Family: Knight of the Gold Lion of Nassau
  - (Saxe-Weimar-Eisenach) Saxe-Weimar Grand Ducal Family: Grand Cross of the White Falcon, 1882
- (Kingdom of Italy) Italian Royal Family: Knight of the Annunciation, 5 July 1913
- Latvia: Commander Grand Cross of the Three Stars
- Monaco: Grand Cross of St. Charles
- Netherlands: Grand Cross of the Netherlands Lion
- (Kingdom of Portugal) Portuguese Royal Family: Grand Cross of the Tower and Sword
- (Kingdom of Romania) Romanian Royal Family: Grand Cross of the Star of Romania
- (Russian Empire) Russian Imperial Family:
  - Knight of St. Andrew
  - Knight of St. Alexander Nevsky
  - Knight of the White Eagle
  - Knight of St. Anna, 1st Class
  - Knight of St. Stanislaus, 1st Class
- (Ottoman Empire) Turkish Imperial Family: Order of Osmanieh, 1st Class

=== Arms ===
| Arms as Prince of Sweden and Norway, Duke of Närke 1865 to 1905 | Arms as Prince of Sweden and Duke of Närke 1905 to 1947 | Royal Monogram of Prince Eugen of Sweden |
