= Andrew Marvel (ship) =

Several vessels have been named Andrew Marvel.

- Andrew Marvel (1812 ship) (or Andrew Marvell) was launched at Hull in 1812. From 1812 to 1835 she was a Greenland whaler, hunting bowhead whales in the northern whale fishery. Thereafter she became a merchantman. She foundered in September 1843 while on a voyage from Hull to Saint John, New Brunswick.
- Andrew Marvel was a trawler of 285 GRT launched in 1812. Between February 1815 and 1819 she served the United Kingdom's Admiralty as a hired armed trawler, serving as a minesweeper. She was armed with a 12-pounder gun. She served in the Mediterranean.
