= Cicerones de Buenos Aires =

Cicerones de Buenos Aires is the name of a non-profit organization that provides free guided tours and travel information to visitors of the city of Buenos Aires, Argentina. Founded in May 2001 by residents of Buenos Aires, the organization's mission is to improve the image of the city though its services.

== Origin of name ==
Cicerones is derived from the term cicerone, meaning tour guide. Members of Cicerones de Buenos Aires are trained, multilingual volunteer tour guides.

== Operations ==
Visitors to the city can contact the organization to schedule a free tour with a guide at a place and time of the visitor's choosing. The guide can also suggest unique, less-traveled sites to visit.
