= List of ships named Cicero =

Several ships have been named Cicero after the Roman statesman, orator, lawyer, and philosopher Cicero:

- Cicero (1796 ship) was launched at Sunderland and initially sailed as a West Indiaman. She was briefly captured in 1799. She went whale hunting both in the northern whale fishery (1803–1808), and the southern whale fishery (1816–1823). She capsized at Limerick in September 1832 and was condemned there.
- Cicero (1799 ship), of 227 tons (bm), was built in the Smith Yard in Boston.
- Cicero (1819 ship) was launched at Hull as a whaler. She made six full voyages to the northern whale fishery and was lost in July 1826 on her seventh.
- Cicero (1822 ship), of 226 or 252 tons (bm), was launched at Mattapoisett, Massachusetts. Between 1831 and 1882 she made 18 voyages as a whaler. She was abandoned and broken up in 1883.
- Cicero (1861) was an iron ship of 1130 tons (NRT) and 1057 tons under deck, launched at Liverpool by Thomas Vernon & Son, Liverpool. Cicero transferred her registry to Germany. On 11 November 1890 she left Shields with a cargo of coal for Valparaiso and was not heard from thereafter.

== See also ==
- HMS Cicero
