= Duke of Nericia =

Provinces of Sweden

Duke of Nericia or Duke of Närke is a Swedish substantive title.

This is a list of Swedish princes who have held Närke as duke:

- Prince Carl, Duke of Nericia 1560–1604 (also of Södermanland and Värmland), then King Carl IX of Sweden
- Prince Carl Philip, Duke of Nericia 1607–1618 (also of Södermanland and Värmland), brother of King Gustav II Adolf
- Prince Eugen (1865–1947), Duke of Nericia, brother of King Gustaf V of Sweden.

== Gallery ==
Coat of Arms of Närke

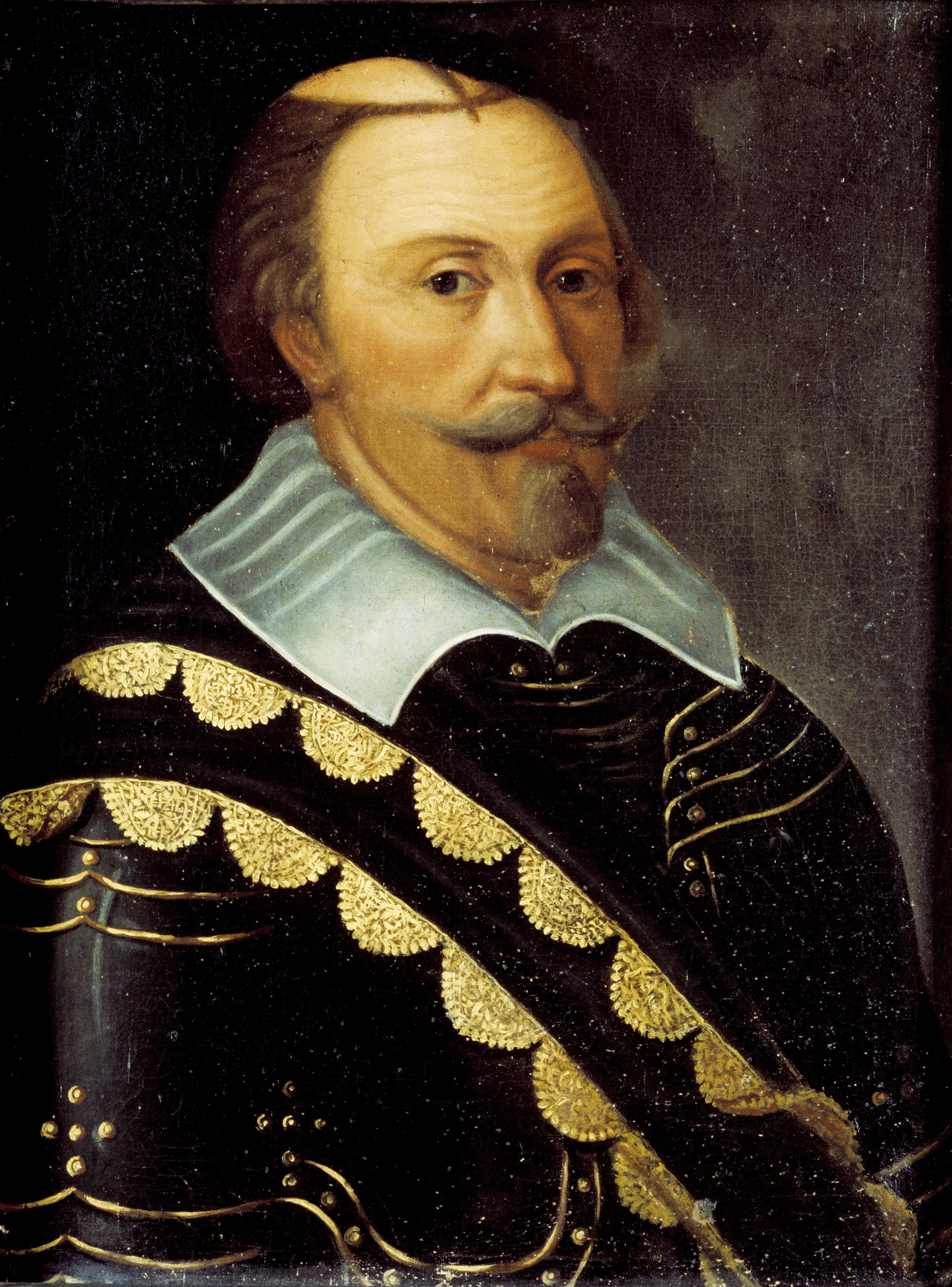
Charles IX of Sweden
Duke of Nericia

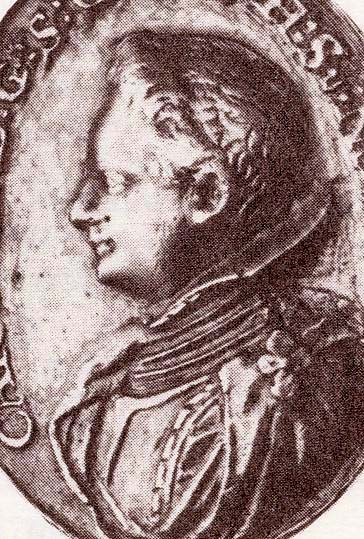
Prince Carl Philip
(1601–1622)

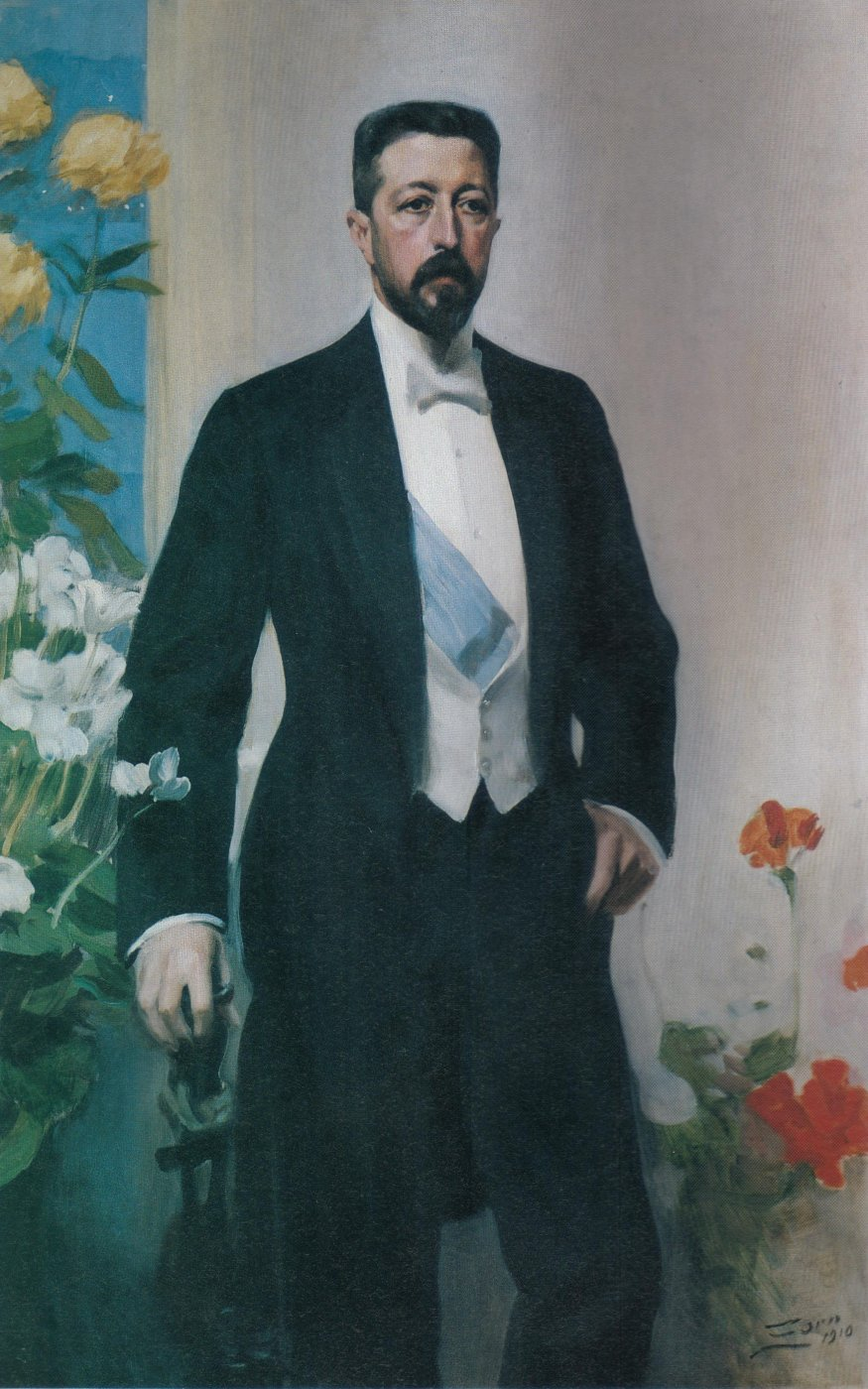
Prince Eugen,
Duke of Närke

Coat of Arms of Prince Eugen, Duke of Närke
