= Cicerone, West Virginia =

Unincorporated community in West Virginia, United States

Cicerone
- Unincorporated community
- Location within the state of West Virginia Cicerone (the United States)
- Coordinates: 38°37′11″N 81°30′31″W
- Country: United States
- State: West Virginia
- County: Roane
- Elevation: 738 ft (225 m)
- Time zone: UTC-5 (Eastern (EST))
  - Summer (DST): UTC-4 (EDT)
- GNIS ID: 1554135

Cicerone is an unincorporated community in Roane County, West Virginia, United States.

The name is derived from cicerone, a type of guide.
