= Grand Tour =

Journey around Europe for cultural education

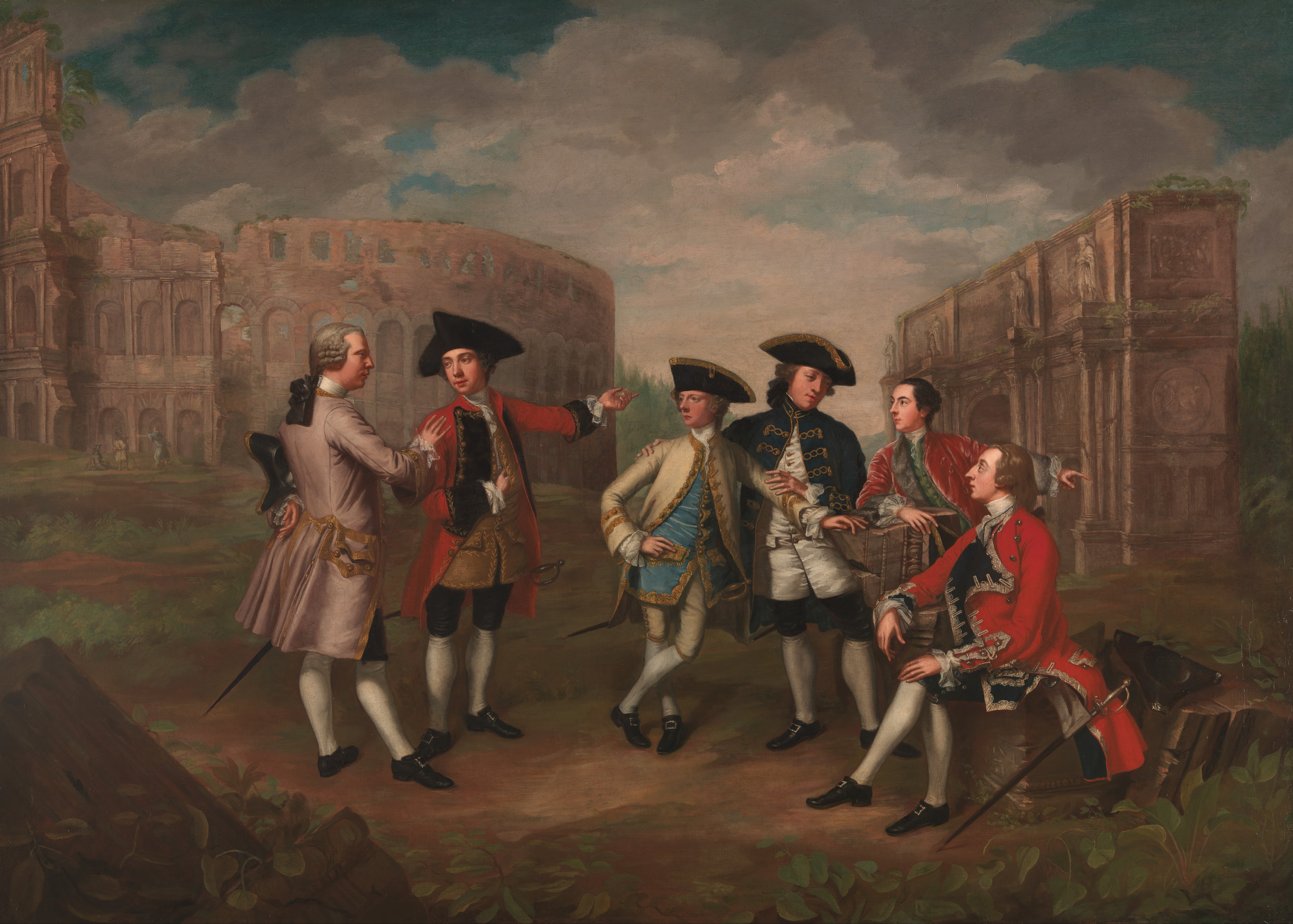
c. 1750 painting of six British gentlemen in Rome while on the Grand Tour

The Grand Tour was the principally 17th- to early 19th-century custom of a traditional trip through Europe, with Italy as a key destination, undertaken by upper-class young European men of sufficient means and rank when they had come of age, at about 21 years old, typically accompanied by a tutor or family member. The custom—which flourished from about 1660 until the advent of large-scale rail transport in the 1840s and was associated with a standard itinerary—served as an educational rite of passage. Though it was primarily associated with the British nobility and wealthy landed gentry, similar trips were made by wealthy young men of other Protestant Northern European nations, and, from the second half of the 18th century, by some North and South Americans.

By the mid-18th century, the Grand Tour was a regular feature of aristocratic education in Central Europe as well, although it was restricted to the higher nobility. The tradition declined in Europe as enthusiasm for classical culture waned, and with the advent of accessible rail and steamship travel—an era in which Thomas Cook made the "Cook's Tour" of early mass tourism a byword starting in the 1870s.

With the rise of industrialization in the United States in the 19th century, American Gilded Age nouveau riche adopted the Grand Tour for both sexes and among those of more advanced years as a means of gaining both exposure and association with the sophistication of Europe. Even those of lesser means sought to mimic the pilgrimage, as satirized in Mark Twain's popular travel book The Innocents Abroad in 1869.

The primary value of the Grand Tour lay in its exposure to the cultural legacy of classical antiquity and the Renaissance, and to the aristocratic and fashionably polite society of the European continent. It provided the only opportunity to view specific works of art, and possibly the only chance to hear certain music. A Grand Tour could last anywhere from several months to several years. It was commonly undertaken in the company of a cicerone, a knowledgeable guide or tutor.

== History ==
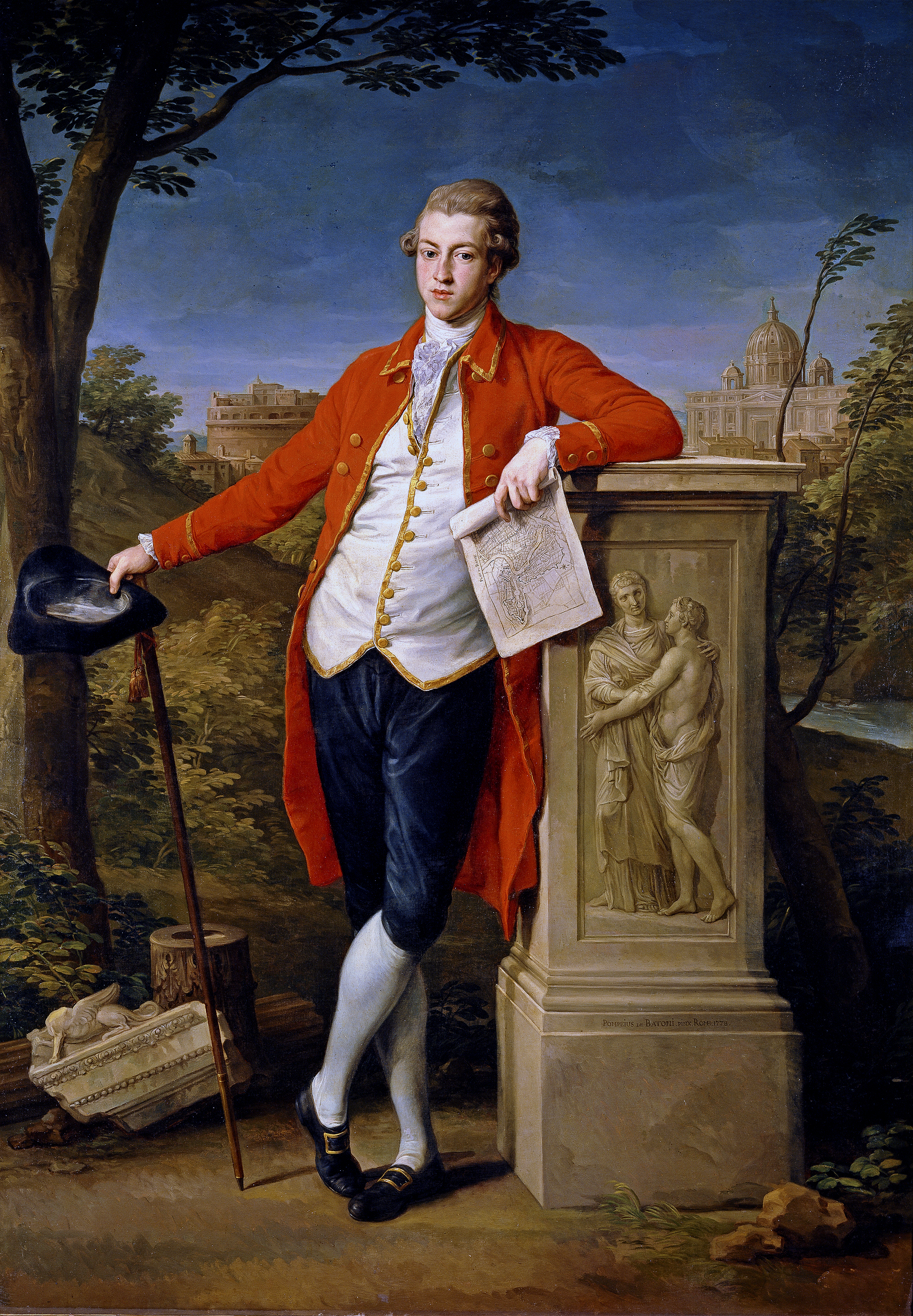
Portrait of Francis Basset by Pompeo Batoni, 1778. The Grand Tourist, like Francis Basset, would become familiar with antiquities, though this altar is an invention of the painter.

Rome for many centuries had already been the destination of pilgrims, especially during Jubilee when European clergy visited the Seven Pilgrim Churches of Rome.

In Britain, Thomas Coryat's travel book Coryat's Crudities (1611), published during the Twelve Years' Truce, was an early influence on the Grand Tour but it was the far more extensive tour through Italy as far as Naples undertaken by the 'Collector' Earl of Arundel, with his wife and children in 1613–14 that established the most significant precedent. This is partly because he asked Inigo Jones, not yet established as an architect but already known as a 'great traveller' and masque designer, to act as his cicerone (guide).

Larger numbers of tourists began their tours after the Peace of Münster in 1648. According to the Oxford English Dictionary, the first recorded use of the term (perhaps its introduction to English) was by Richard Lassels (circa 1603–1668), an expatriate Roman Catholic priest, in his book The Voyage of Italy, which was published posthumously in Paris in 1670 and then in London. (Note: Anthony Wood reported that the book was "esteemed the best and surest Guide or Tutor for young men of his Time." see Edward Chaney, "Richard Lassels", ODNB, and idem, The Grand Tour and the Great Rebellion (Geneva, 1985)) Lassels's introduction listed four areas in which travel furnished "an accomplished, consummate Traveller": the intellectual, the social, the ethical (by the opportunity of drawing moral instruction from all the traveller saw), and the political.

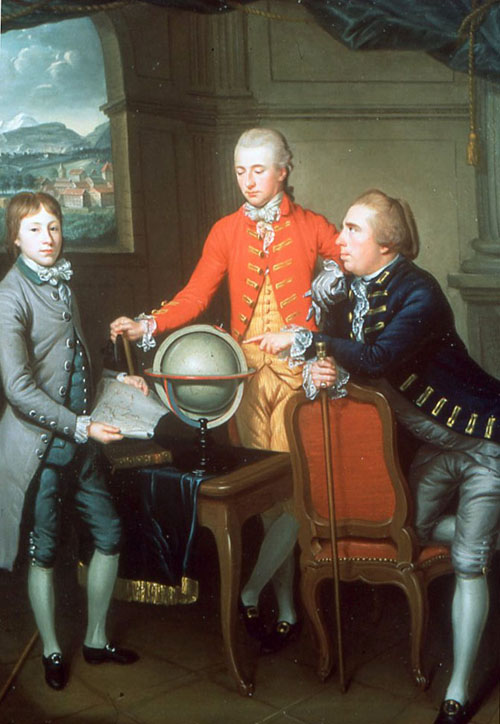
A portrait of Douglas, 8th Duke of Hamilton, on his Grand Tour with his physician Dr. John Moore and the latter's son John. A view of Geneva in the distance, where they stayed for two years. Painted by Jean Preudhomme in 1774.

As a young man at the outset of his account of a repeat Grand Tour, the historian Edward Gibbon remarked that "According to the law of custom, and perhaps of reason, foreign travel completes the education of an English gentleman." Consciously adapted for intellectual self-improvement, Gibbon was "revisiting the Continent on a larger and more liberal plan"; most Grand Tourists did not pause more than briefly in libraries. On the eve of the Romantic era he played a significant part in introducing, William Beckford wrote a vivid account of his Grand Tour that made Gibbon's unadventurous Italian tour look distinctly conventional.

The typical 18th-century stance was that of the studious observer travelling through foreign lands, reporting his findings on human nature for those unfortunates who stayed at home. Recounting one's observations to society at large to increase its welfare was considered an obligation. The Grand Tour flourished in this mindset. In essence, the Grand Tour was neither a scholarly pilgrimage nor a religious one. Grand Tourists in the 18th century frequently traveled with an entourage, which could include tutors and servants, but Grand Tourists still used guide books.

Popular guidebooks for the Grand Tour were prolifically published from the mid 18th century onward, though guidebooks for major Italian cities had been in circulation since 1660. These also frequently included detailed urban maps, increasingly facilitating more independent and self-guided experiences of cities and their ruins. Grand Tour guide books were used by young aristocrats, but had the bourgeoisie purpose of helping the reader make an authoritative choice.

Grand Tour hot spots were Paris and Rome. European capital cities were Grand Tour stop overs frequently requiring traveling across the Alps and forcing Grand Tourists to gaze at length at natural sights such as Mount Etna and Mount Vesuvius. Climbing mountains, crossing rivers, and purchasing souvenirs were part of the traveling experience.

The Grand Tour offered a liberal education, and the opportunity to acquire things otherwise unavailable, lending an air of accomplishment and prestige to the traveller. Grand Tourists would return with crates full of books, works of art, scientific instruments, and cultural artefacts – from snuff boxes and paperweights to altars, fountains, and statuary – to be displayed in libraries, cabinets, gardens, drawing rooms, and galleries built for that purpose. The trappings of the Grand Tour, especially portraits of the traveller painted in continental settings, became the obligatory emblems of worldliness, gravitas and influence. Artists who particularly thrived on the Grand Tour market included Carlo Maratti, who was first patronised by John Evelyn as early as 1645, Pompeo Batoni the portraitist, and the vedutisti such as Canaletto, Pannini and Guardi. The less well-off could return with an album of Piranesi etchings.

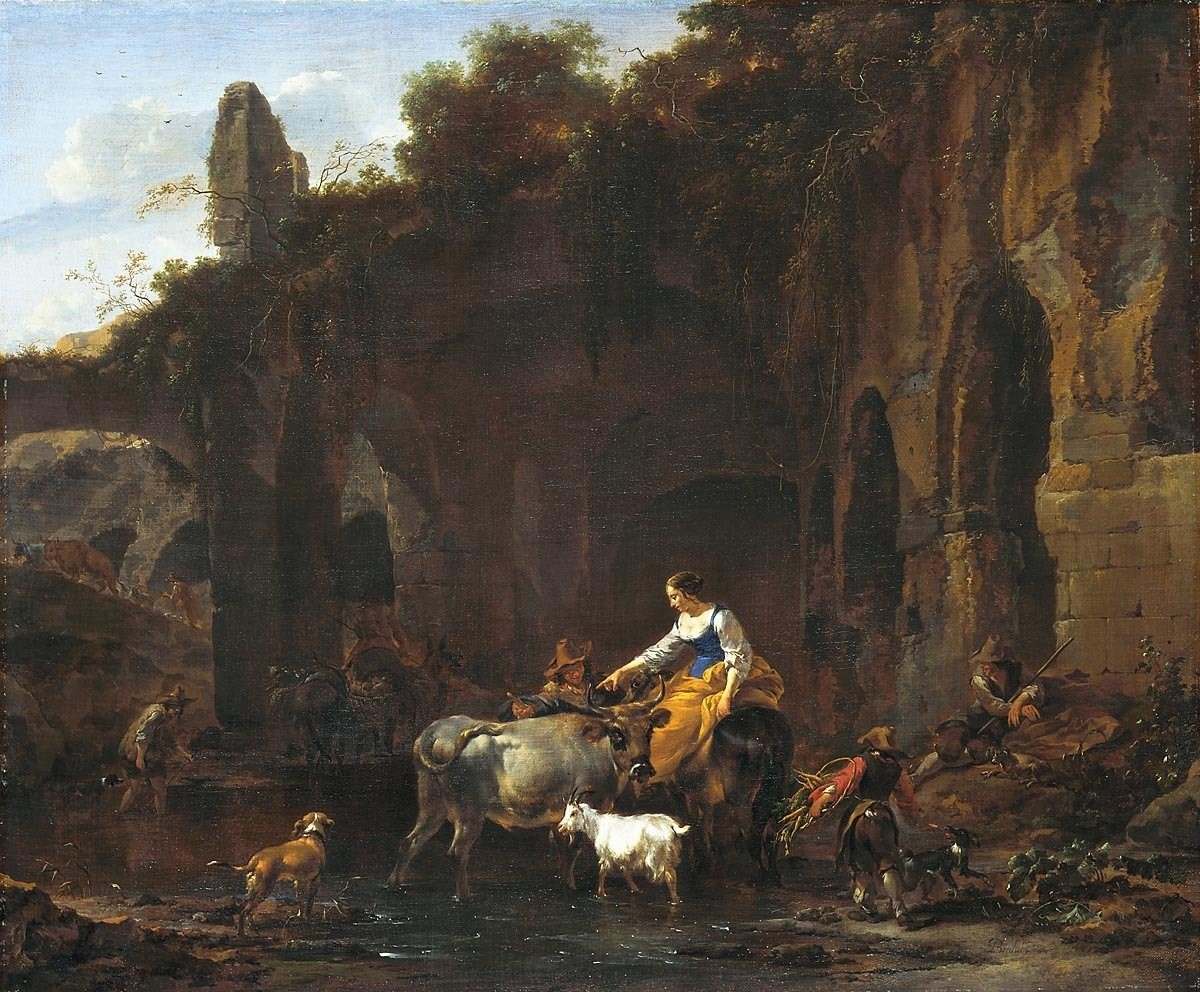
Northerners found the contrast between Roman ruins and modern peasants of the Roman Campagna an educational lesson in vanity (vanitas). Painting by Nicolaes Pietersz Berchem, 1661, Mauritshuis

The "perhaps" in Gibbon's opening remark cast an ironic shadow over his resounding statement. Critics of the Grand Tour derided its lack of adventure. "The tour of Europe is a paltry thing", said one 18th century critic, "a tame, uniform, unvaried prospect". The Grand Tour was said to reinforce the old preconceptions and prejudices about national characteristics, as Jean Gailhard's Compleat Gentleman (1678) observes: "French courteous. Spanish lordly. Italian amorous. German clownish." The deep suspicion with which Tour was viewed at home in England, where it was feared that the very experiences that completed the British gentleman might well undo him, were epitomised in the sarcastic nativist view of the ostentatiously "well-travelled" maccaroni of the 1760s and 1770s.

Also worth noticing is that the Grand Tour not only fostered stereotypes of the countries visited but also led to a dynamic of contrast between northern and southern Europe. By constantly depicting Italy as a "picturesque place", the travellers also unconsciously degraded Italy as a place of backwardness. This unconscious degradation is best reflected in the famous verses of Lamartine in which Italy is depicted as a "land of the past... where everything sleeps."

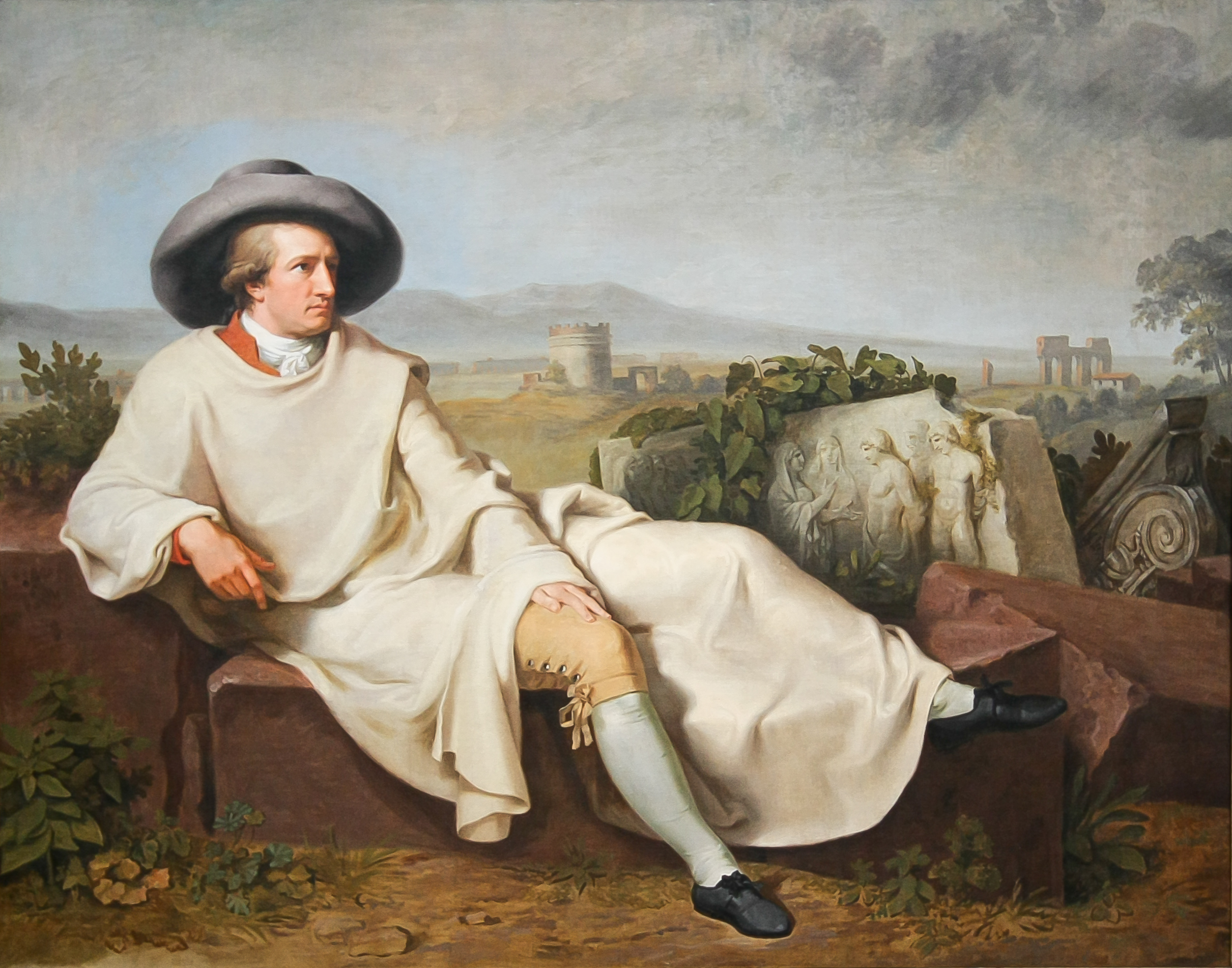
Goethe in the Roman Campagna, by Johann Tischbein, 1787

In Rome, antiquaries like Thomas Jenkins were also dealers and were able to sell and advise on the purchase of marbles; their price would rise if it were known that the Tourists were interested. The growing demand for antiquities during the Grand Tour also led to the development of dedicated tourist zones and early forms of tourism infrastructure around classical ruins and excavation sites.

Coins and medals, which formed more portable souvenirs and a respected gentleman's guide to ancient history were popular. Pompeo Batoni made a career of painting the English milordi posed with graceful ease among Roman antiquities. Many continued on to Naples, where they also viewed Herculaneum and Pompeii, but few ventured far into Southern Italy, and fewer still to Greece, then still under Turkish rule.

After the advent of steam-powered transportation around 1825, the Grand Tour custom continued, but it was of a qualitative difference – cheaper to undertake, safer, easier, open to anyone. During much of the 19th century, most educated young men of privilege undertook the Grand Tour. Germany and Switzerland came to be included in a more broadly defined circuit. Later, it became fashionable for young women as well; a trip to Italy, with a spinster aunt as chaperone, was part of the upper-class women's education, as in E. M. Forster's novel A Room with a View.

British travellers were far from alone on the roads of Europe. On the contrary, from the mid-16th century, the grand tour was established as an ideal way to finish off the education of young men in countries such as Denmark, France, Germany, the Netherlands, Poland and Sweden. In spite of this the bulk of research conducted on the Grand Tour has been on British travellers. Dutch scholar Frank-van Westrienen Anna has made note of this historiographic focus, claiming that the scholarly understanding of the Grand Tour would have been more complex if more comparative studies had been carried out on continental travellers.

Recent scholarship on the Swedish aristocracy has demonstrated that Swedish aristocrats, though being relatively poorer than their British peers, from around 1620 and onwards in many ways acted as their British counterparts. After studies at one or two renowned universities, preferably those of Leiden and Heidelberg, the Swedish grand tourists set off to France and Italy, where they spent time in Paris, Rome and Venice and completed the original grand tour on the French countryside. King Gustav III of Sweden made his Grand Tour in 1783–84.

== Typical itinerary ==
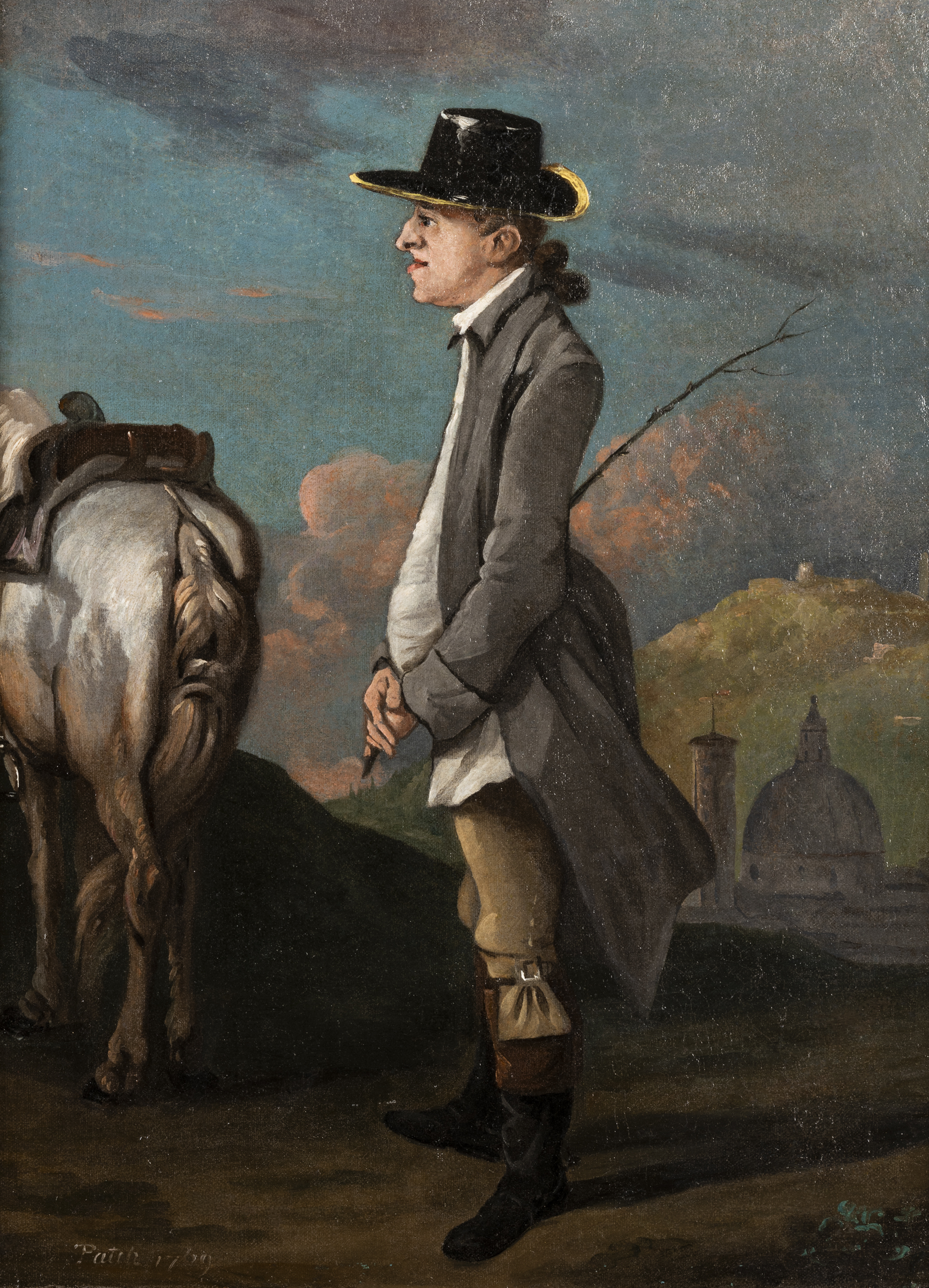
Portrait of a Gentleman on the Grand Tour by Thomas Patch, 1769. This oil on canvas painting shows a gentleman facing left with Florence and the Duomo beyond.

The itinerary of the Grand Tour was not set in stone, but was subject to innumerable variations, depending on an individual's interests and finances, though Paris and Rome were popular destinations for most English tourists.

The most common itinerary of the Grand Tour shifted across generations, but the British tourist usually began in Dover, England, and crossed the English Channel to Ostend in Belgium, (Note: Ostend was the starting point for William Beckford on the continent.) or to Calais or Le Havre in France. From there the tourist, usually accompanied by a tutor (known colloquially as a "bear-leader") and (if wealthy enough) a troop of servants, could rent or acquire a coach (which could be resold in any city – as in Giacomo Casanova's travels – or disassembled and packed across the Alps), or he could opt to make the trip by riverboat as far as the Alps, either travelling up the Seine to Paris, or up the Rhine to Basel.

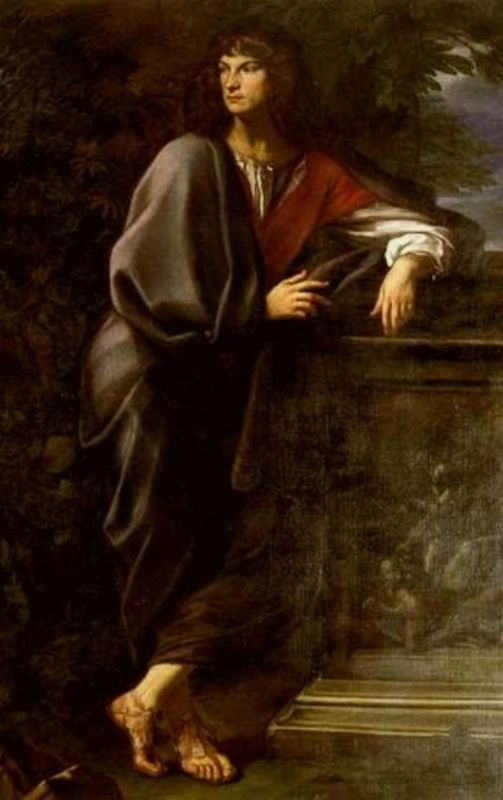
Robert Spencer, 2nd Earl of Sunderland (1640–1702), painted in classical dress in Rome by Carlo Maratti

Upon hiring a French-speaking guide, as French was the dominant language of the elite in Europe during the 17th and 18th centuries, the tourist and his entourage would travel to Paris. There the traveller might undertake lessons in French, dancing, fencing, and riding. The appeal of Paris lay in the sophisticated language and manners of French high society, including courtly behavior and fashion. This served to polish the young man's manners in preparation for a leadership position at home, often in government or diplomacy.

From Paris he would typically sojourn in urban Switzerland, often in Geneva (the cradle of the Protestant Reformation) or Lausanne. ("Alpinism" or mountaineering developed later, in the 19th century.) From there the traveller would endure a difficult crossing over the Alps (such as at the Great St Bernard Pass), which required dismantling the carriage and larger luggage. If wealthy enough, he might be carried over the hard terrain by servants.

Once in Italy, the tourist would visit Turin (and sometimes Milan), then might spend a few months in Florence, where there was a considerable Anglo-Italian society accessible to travelling Englishmen "of quality" and where the Tribuna of the Uffizi gallery brought together in one space the monuments of High Renaissance paintings and Roman sculpture. After a side trip to Pisa, the tourist would move on to Padua, Bologna, and Venice. The British idea of Venice (by then a fabled centuries long independent republic) as the "locus of decadent Italianate allure" made it an epitome and cultural set piece of the Grand Tour.

From Venice, the traveller went to Rome to study the ancient ruins and the masterpieces of painting, sculpture, and architecture of Rome's Medieval, Renaissance, and Baroque periods. Some travellers also visited Naples to study music, and (after the mid-18th century) to appreciate the recently discovered archaeological sites of Herculaneum and Pompeii, and perhaps (for the adventurous) an ascent of Mount Vesuvius. Later in the period, the more adventurous, especially if provided with a yacht, might attempt Sicily to see its archaeological sites, volcanoes and its baroque architecture, Malta or even Greece itself. But Naples – or later Paestum further south – was the usual terminus.

Returning northward, the tourist might recross the Alps to the German-speaking parts of Europe, visiting Innsbruck, Vienna, Dresden, Berlin and Potsdam, with perhaps a period of study at the universities in Ingolstadt or Heidelberg. From there, travellers could visit Holland and Flanders (with more gallery-going and art appreciation) before returning across the Channel to England.

== Published accounts ==
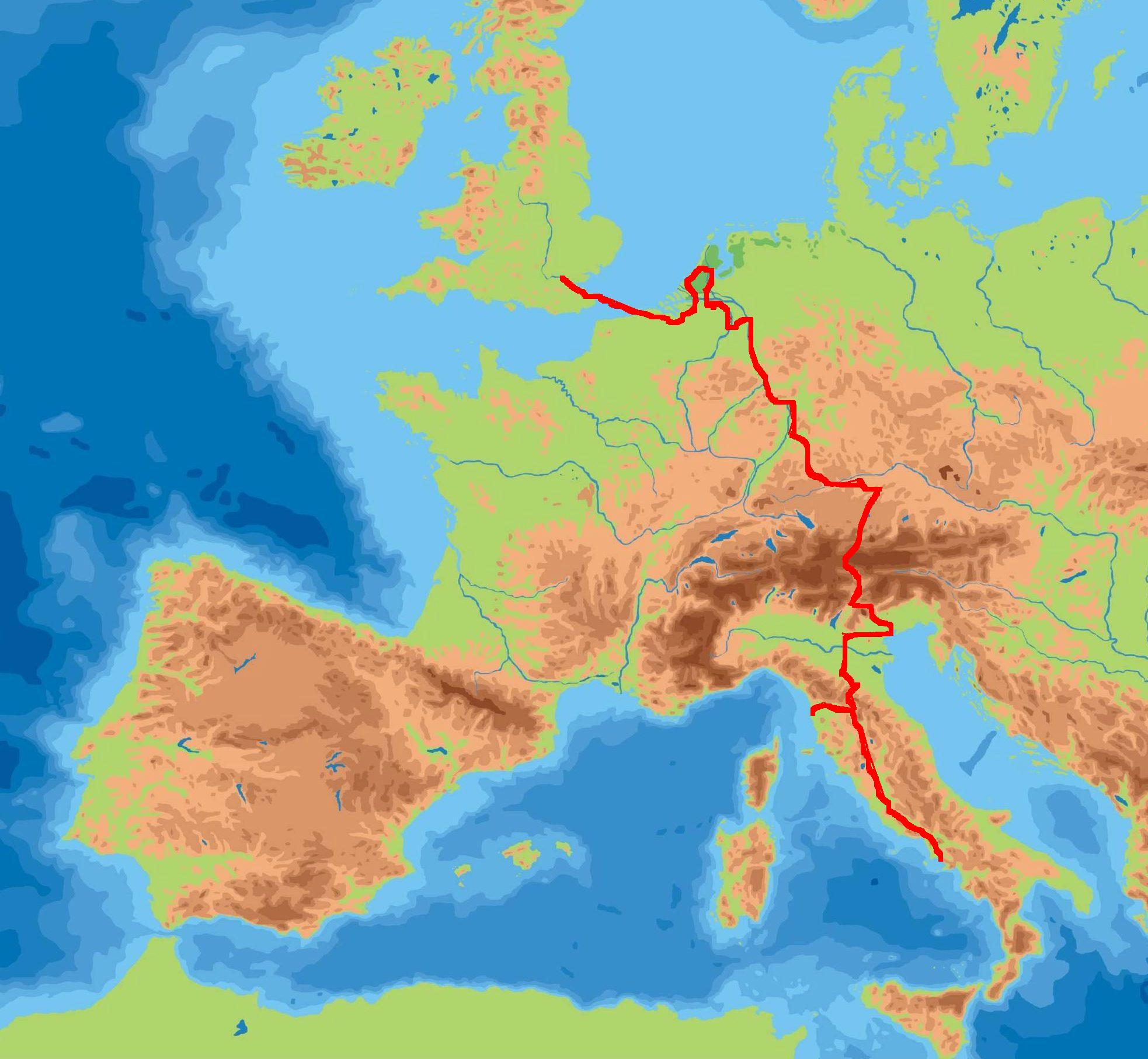
William Beckford's 1780–1781 Grand Tour through Europe shown in red

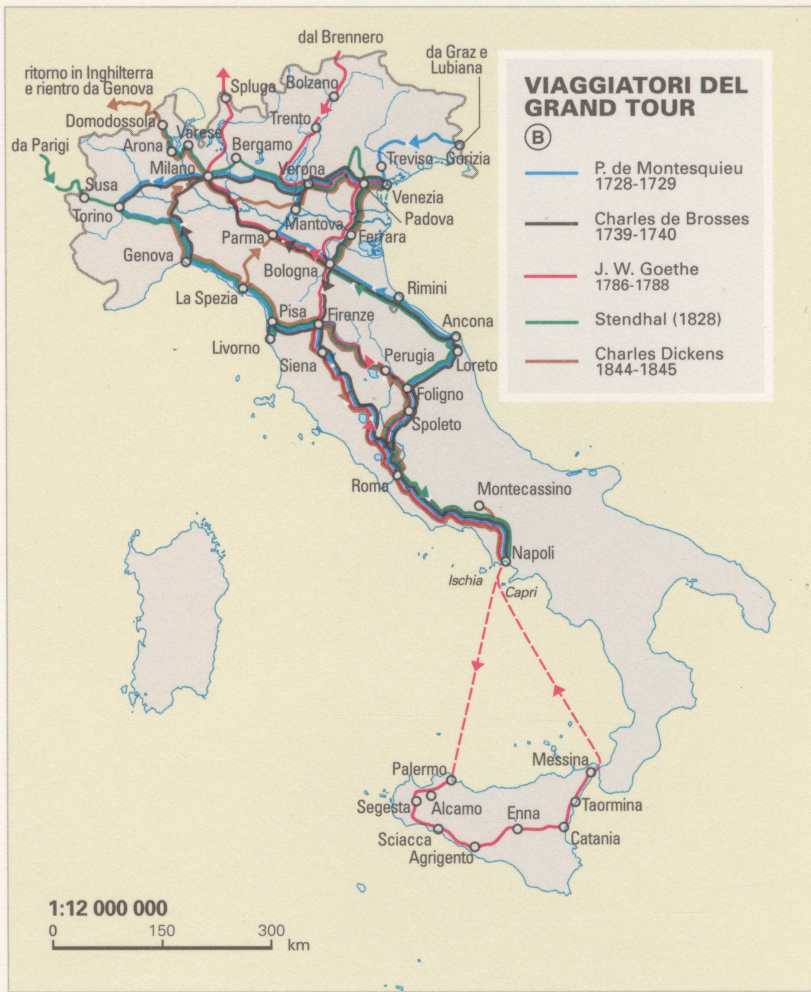
Routes of the Grand Tours of Montesquieu, de Brosses, Goethe, Stendhal, and Dickens

Published accounts of the Grand Tour provided illuminating detail and an often polished first-hand perspective of the experience. Examining some accounts offered by authors in their own lifetimes, Jeremy Black detects the element of literary artifice in these and cautions that they should be approached as travel literature rather than unvarnished accounts. He lists as examples Joseph Addison, John Andrews, William Thomas Beckford (whose Dreams, Waking Thoughts, and Incidents was a published account of his letters back home in 1780–1781, embellished with stream-of-consciousness associations), William Coxe, Elizabeth Craven, John Moore, tutor to successive dukes of Hamilton, Samuel Jackson Pratt, Tobias Smollett, Philip Thicknesse, and Arthur Young.

Although Italy was written as the "sink of iniquity", many travelers were not kept from recording the activities they participated in or the people they met, especially the women they encountered. To the Grand Tourists, Italy was an unconventional country, for "The shameless women of Venice made it unusual, in its own way." Sir James Hall confided in his written diary to comment on seeing "more handsome women this day than I ever saw in my life", also noting "how flattering Venetian dress [was] — or perhaps the lack of it".

Eighteenth- and nineteenth-century Italian women, with their unfamiliar methods and routines, were opposites to the western dress expected of European women in the eighteenth and nineteenth century; their "foreign" ways led to the documentation of encounters with them, providing published accounts of the Grand Tour.

James Boswell in the 18th century courted noble ladies and recorded his progress with his relationships, mentioning that Madame Micheli "Talked of religion, philosophy... Kissed hand often." The promiscuity of Boswell's encounters with Italian elite are shared in his diary and provide further detail on events that occurred during the Grand Tour. Boswell notes "Yesterday morning with her. Pulled up petticoat and showed whole knees... Touched with her goodness. All other liberties exquisite." He describes his time with the Italian women he encounters and shares a part of history in his written accounts.

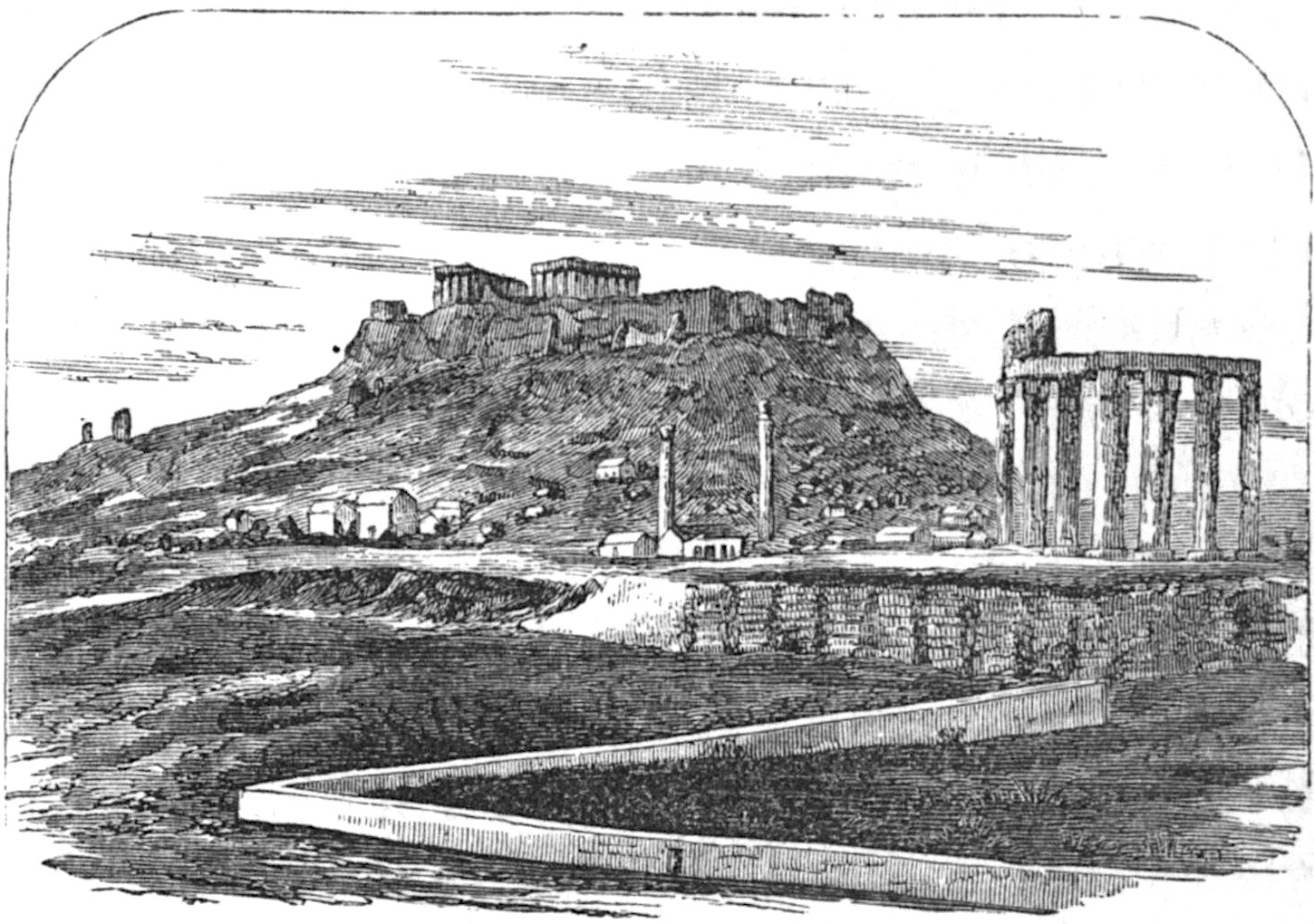
A plate of the ruins of the Acropolis from Mark Twain's grand tour, a five-month 20,000-mile excursion of Europe, the Middle East, and the Holy Land satirized in his 1867 work Innocents Abroad

Lord Byron's letters to his mother with the accounts of his travels have also been published from the early 19th century. Byron spoke of his first enduring Venetian love, his landlord's wife, mentioning that he has "fallen in love with a very pretty Venetian of two and twenty – with great black eyes — she is married — and so am I — we have found & sworn an eternal attachment ... & I am more in love than ever... and I verily believe we are one of the happiest unlawful couples on this side of the Alps." Many tourists enjoyed sexual relations while abroad but to a great extent were well behaved, such as Thomas Pelham, and scholars, such as Richard Pococke, who wrote lengthy letters of their Grand Tour experiences.

Inventor Sir Francis Ronalds' journals and sketches of his 1818–20 tour to Europe and the Near East have been published online. The letters written by sisters Mary and Ida Saxton of Canton, Ohio in 1869 while on a six-month tour offer insight into the Grand Tour tradition from an American perspective.

Immediately following the American Civil War, U.S. author and humorist Mark Twain undertook a "grand tour" of Europe, the Middle East, and the Holy Land, which he chronicled in his satire Innocents Abroad in 1867. It was the best-selling of Twain's works during his lifetime, and became one of the best-selling travel books of all time.

== In literature ==
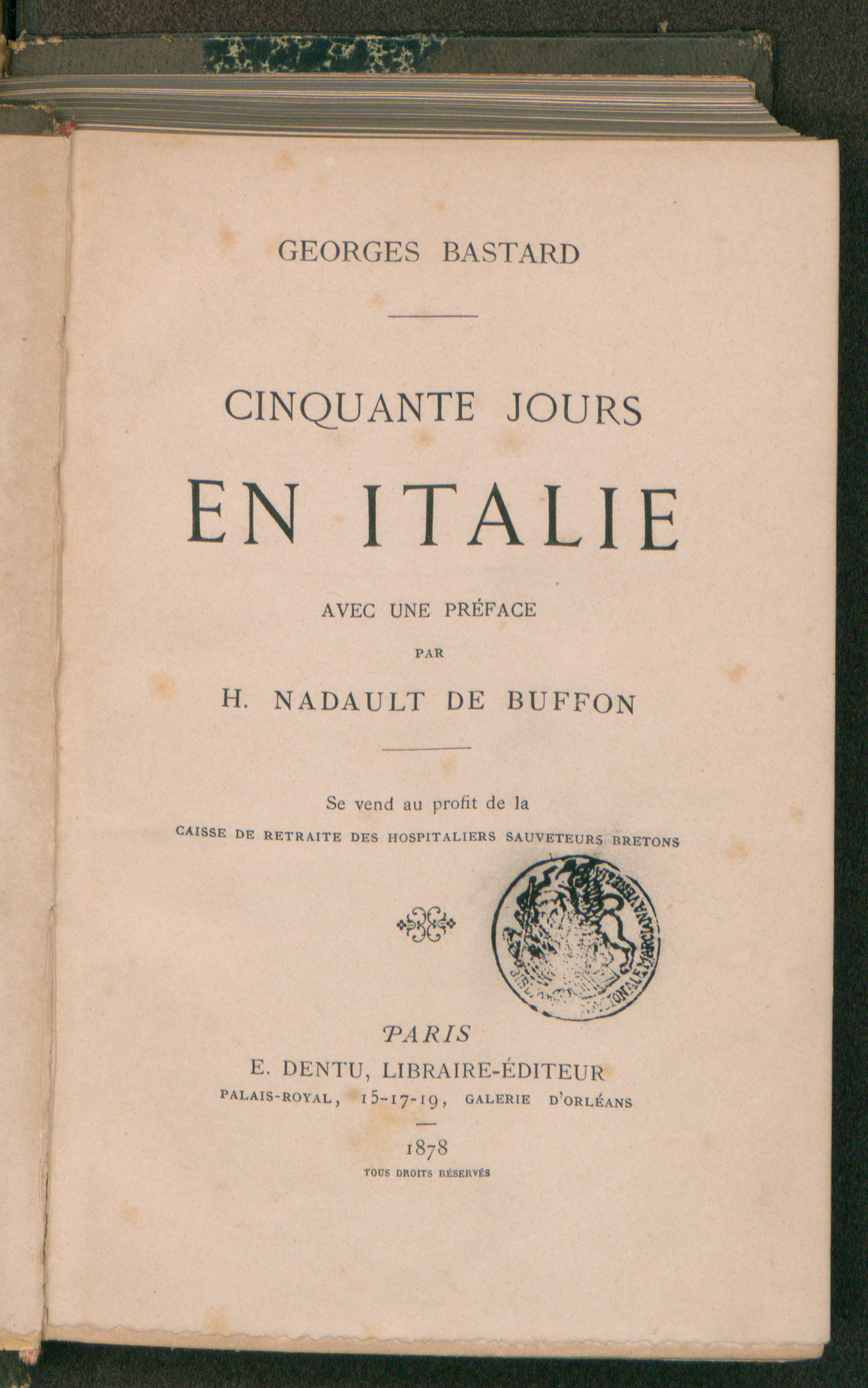
Georges Bastard, Cinquante jours en Italie ("Fifty days in Italy"), 1878, one of the many reports of the Grand Tour in Italy.

Margaret Mitchell's American Civil War-based novel, Gone with the Wind, makes reference to the Grand Tour. Stuart Tartleton, in a conversation with his twin brother, Brent, suspects that their mother is not likely to provide them with a Grand Tour, since they have been expelled from college again. Brent is not concerned, remarking, "What is there to see in Europe? I'll bet those foreigners can't show us a thing we haven't got right here in Georgia". Ashley Wilkes, on the other hand, enjoyed the scenery and music he encountered on his Grand Tour and was always talking about it.

== Popular culture ==
In 1998, the BBC produced an art history series Sister Wendy's Grand Tour presented by British Carmelite nun Sister Wendy. Ostensibly an art history series, the journey takes her from Madrid to Saint Petersburg with stop-offs to see the great masterpieces.

In 2005, British art historian Brian Sewell followed in the footsteps of the Grand Tourists for a 10-part television series Brian Sewell's Grand Tour. Produced by UK's Channel Five, Sewell travelled by car and confined his attention solely to Italy stopping in Rome, Florence, Naples, Pompeii, Turin, Milan, Cremona, Siena, Bologna, Vicenza, Paestum, Urbino, Tivoli and concluding at a Venetian masked ball. Material relating to this can be found in the Brian Sewell Archive held by the Paul Mellon Centre for Studies in British Art.

In 2009, the Grand Tour featured prominently in a BBC/PBS miniseries based on Little Dorrit by Charles Dickens. Set mainly in Venice, it portrayed the Grand Tour as a rite of passage.

Kevin McCloud presented Kevin McCloud's Grand Tour on Channel 4 in 2009 with McCloud retracing the tours of British architects.

== See also ==
- Camino de Santiago
- Gap year
- Hippie trail
- Walking tour
- Overseas experience
- Field trip
- Grand touring
