= Cicero (1819 ship) =

History

United Kingdom
- Name: Cicero
- Namesake: Cicero
- Builder: Hull
- Launched: 1819
- Fate: Wrecked 1 July 1826

General characteristics
- Tons burthen: 320 (bm)

Cicero was launched at Hull in 1819 as a Greenland whaler, hunting bowhead whales. She made six full voyages to the Greenland whale fishery and was lost in July 1826 on her seventh.

== Career ==
Cicero first appeared in Lloyd's Register (LR) in 1819 with Parkin, master, Raith & Co., owner, and trade Hull-Greenland.

Year	Master	Owner	Trade	Source & notes
1820	Parkin	Raith & Co.	Hull–Greenland	LR
1825	T.Lee	Routh & Co.	Hull–Greenland	LR; large repairs 1821, 1822, & 1823

=== Whaling voyages ===
The following data is from Coltish:

Year	Master	Where	Whales	Tuns whale oil
1819	Parkin	Greenland	6	38
1820	Parkin	Greenland	9	80
1821	Leaf	Greenland	7	101
1822	Leaf	Greenland	2	33 (70 Butts)
1823	Lee	Greenland	5	89
1824	Lee	Davis Strait	14	159

Cicero was the fifth most successful whaler in the 1824 season in Davis Strait.

Year	Master	Where	Whales	Tuns whale oil
1825	Lee	Davis Strait	15	200
1826	Lee	Davis Strait	0	0

Cicero was the second most successful whaler in the 1825 season in Davis Strait.

== Fate ==
Cicero, Lee, master, was lost on 6 June 1826, (or 1 July 1826) in the Davis Strait. Andrew Marvel rescued her crew. She was lost in Latitude 65°10′ North, and was the first vessel lost in the season. After Andrew Marvel rescued the crew, they were distributed amongst the fleet. By another report, Cicero was destroyed by taking the "Middle Ice" in Latitude 75°12′ North, at midnight 7 June 1826.
