= Bear-leader (guide) =

Man who accompanies travelling young men

In the 18th and 19th centuries, a bear-leader was a colloquialism for a man who escorted young men of rank or wealth on their travels, such as young gentlemen on the Grand Tour. The role of bear-leader blended elements of tutor, guardian, chaperon and companion. A late example in literature can be seen in the ambitious Oxford tutor (Mr Samgrass of All Souls College, Oxford) hired to keep an increasingly alcoholic young man out of harm's way – and out of the way – in Brideshead Revisited.

== See also ==
- Cicerone
