= Cicero, Ohio =

Extinct town in Ohio, U.S.

Coordinates: 41°20′22″N 84°42′34″W

Cicero is an extinct town in Defiance County, in the U.S. state of Ohio.

== History ==
Cicero had its start in 1846 when a sawmill was built there. Once the surrounding forests were depleted, the sawmill closed and the town's population dwindled. Cicero had a post office from 1852 until it was discontinued in 1901.
