= Cicero (surname) =

Cicero is a surname. Notable people with the surname include:

- Antonio Cicero (1945–2024), Brazilian lyricist, poet, literary critic, philosopher and writer
- Chic Cicero (born 1936), founder and co-Chief of the modern Hermetic Order of the Golden Dawn
- David Cicero (born 1970), Scottish singer and keyboardist
- Frank Cicero Jr. (1935–2024), American lawyer and historian
- Joe Cicero (1910–1983), American baseball player and scout
- Nando Cicero (1931–1995), Italian director and actor
- Padre Cícero (1844–1934), Brazilian priest Cícero Romão Batista
- Roger Cicero (1970–2016), German singer
- Tabatha Cicero, co-chief of the modern Hermetic Order of the Golden Dawn

== See also ==
- Andrea Lo Cicero (born 1976), Italian rugby player
- Lisa LoCicero (born 1970), American actress
