= Cicero, Wisconsin =

- Town
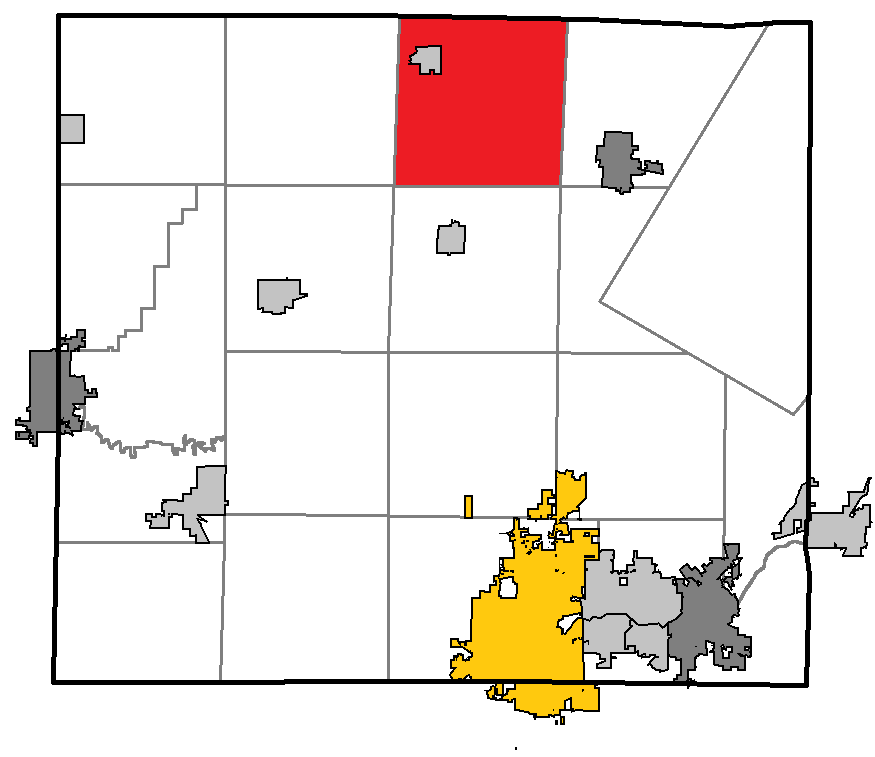
- Location of Cicero, within Outagamie County
- Coordinates: 44°32′39″N 88°26′47″W
- Country: United States
- State: Wisconsin
- County: Outagamie
- Established: 1871

Area
  - Total: 35.5 sq mi (91.9 km^{2})
  - Land: 35.5 sq mi (91.9 km^{2})
  - Water: 0 sq mi (0.0 km^{2})
- Elevation: 801 ft (244 m)

Population (2020)
  - Total: 1,008
  - Density: 28.4/sq mi (11.0/km^{2})
- Time zone: UTC-6 (Central (CST))
  - Summer (DST): UTC-5 (CDT)
- FIPS code: 55-14750
- GNIS feature ID: 1582961
- Website: townofcicerowi.com

Cicero is a town in Outagamie County, Wisconsin, United States. The population was 1,008 at the 2020 census.

== History ==
Cicero was originally separated from the Town of Black Creek (then Black Creek's northern half). Petitioners requested the new town in January 1871. The Outagamie county board determined that it was illegal to divide the town of Black Creek at the time, because bonds issued to build the Green Bay and Lake Pepin railroad through the Town of Black Creek were still outstanding. Therefore, a special session of the Wisconsin state legislature performed the action, assigning $5,000 of the bond debt to the new town of Cicero, and $7,000 to the town of Black Creek. The meeting to elect officers of the town was held April 4, 1871.

Cicero was named for Cicero, New York, the former home of the chairman of the new town.

== Geography ==
According to the United States Census Bureau, the town has a total area of 35.5 square miles (91.9 km^{2}), of which 35.5 square miles (91.9 km^{2}) is land and 0.03% is water.

== Demographics ==
As of the census of 2000, there were 1,092 people, 370 households, and 304 families residing in the town. The population density was 30.8 people per square mile (11.9/km^{2}). There were 384 housing units at an average density of 10.8 per square mile (4.2/km^{2}). The racial makeup of the town was 99.27% White, 0.09% Native American, 0.18% Asian, 0.09% from other races, and 0.37% from two or more races. Hispanic or Latino of any race were 0.46% of the population.

There were 370 households, out of which 39.7% had children under the age of 18 living with them, 74.3% were married couples living together, 3.0% had a female householder with no husband present, and 17.6% were non-families. 14.3% of all households were made up of individuals, and 6.5% had someone living alone who was 65 years of age or older. The average household size was 2.95 and the average family size was 3.25.

In the town, the population was spread out, with 29.9% under the age of 18, 8.6% from 18 to 24, 29.9% from 25 to 44, 21.8% from 45 to 64, and 9.8% who were 65 years of age or older. The median age was 34 years. For every 100 females, there were 113.7 males. For every 100 females age 18 and over, there were 111.0 males.

The median income for a household in the town was $49,625, and the median income for a family was $53,500. Males had a median income of $33,421 versus $22,574 for females. The per capita income for the town was $19,783. About 2.4% of families and 4.2% of the population were below the poverty line, including 5.7% of those under age 18 and none of those age 65 or over.
