= Andrew Marvel (1812 ship) =

British whaler and merchantman 1812–1843

History

United Kingdom
- Name: Andrew Marvel
- Namesake: Andrew Marvell
- Builder: Thomas Richardson, Hull
- Launched: 1812
- Fate: Foundered September 1843

General characteristics
- Tons burthen: 377, or 379(bm)
- Complement: 41 (1821)
- Armament: 8 × 9-pounder carronades

Andrew Marvel (or Andrew Marvell) was launched in Hull in 1812. From 1812 to 1835, she was a Greenland whaler, hunting bowhead whales in the northern whale fishery. Thereafter, she became a merchantman. She foundered in September 1843, while on a voyage from Hull to Saint John, New Brunswick.

== Greenland whaler ==
Thomas Richardson built Andrew Marvel on the lines of the whaler Isabella that he had built in 1786.

Andrew Marvell first appeared in Lloyd's Register (LR) in 1812, with T. Orton, master, Marshall, owner, and trade Hull–Davis Strait.

The following data are primarily from Coltish:

Year	Master	Where	Whales	Tuns whale oil	Notes
1812	Orton		14	150	
1813	Orton	Davis Strait	3	41	
1814	Orton	Greenland	11	164	
1815	Orton	Davis Strait	5	76	
1816	Orton	Davis Strait	17	241 (600 butts)	
1817	Orton	Davis Strait	4	59	
1818	Orton	Davis Strait	5	73	
1819	Orton	Davis Strait	14	182	Orton was whaling in the vicinity of South-East Bay, the southern end of Disko Bay. The weather was much severer than in 1818.

In 1819, a record 65 whalers sailed from Hull. Andrew Marvel sold for £7,800, complete, but net of outfitting for the coming season. She was the first whaler to return; she had left the ice on 8 July and arrived back at Hull on 12 August.

Year	Master	Where	Whales	Tuns whale oil	Notes
1820	Orton	Davis Strait	10	129	
1821	Orton	Greenland	18	216	12 tons of whale bone
1822	Orton	Davis Strait	4	46	
1823	Orton	Davis Strait	27	230	271½ cwt of
1824	Blythe	Davis Strait	10	150	
1825	Hedon	Davis Strait	11	120	
1826	Silcock	Davis Strait	9	134	On 1 July 1826, Cicero was wrecked in the Davis Strait. Andrew Marvel rescued her crew. The crew was later distributed among the other vessels in the fleet.
1827	Silcock	Davis Strait	16	189	
1828	Silcock	Davis Strait	10	117	
1829	Orton	Davis Strait	8	104	
1830	Orton	Davis Strait	0	0	
1831	Wright	Davis Strait	4	55	
1832	Wright	Davis Strait	31	280	
1833	Wright	Davis Strait	36	285	This was the greatest amount brought in by any Hull whaler between 1772 and 1852.
1834	Wright	Davis Strait	13	130	
1835	Wright	Davis Strait	2		
1836	Wright	Davis Strait	0	0	

== Merchantman ==
LR for 1836, showed Andrew Marvel with M. Wright, master, Hopwood, owner, and trade Hull–Davis Strait, changing to Hull–America. She had had a thorough repair in 1836.

Year	Master	Owner	Trade	Source & notes
1840	Chambers	Hopwood	Hull–Quebec	LR; large repair 1826
1843	Chambers	Hopwood	Hull–Quebec	LR; large repair 1826

== Fate ==
On 25 September 1843, Andrew Marvel was sinking at 42°N 57°W when Lotus came on the scene and rescued the crew. Andrew Marvel had been sailing from Hull to Saint John. LR for 1844 carried the annotation "Lost" by her name.
