= Cícero (given name) =

Cícero is a Portuguese masculine given name, mainly found in Brazil. People bearing the name include:

- Cícero Romão Batista (1844–1934), known as Padre Cícero, Brazilian Catholic priest
- Cícero Braga (born 1958), Brazilian chess International Master
- Cícero João de Cézare (born 1980), known as Cicinho, Brazilian footballer
- Cícero Júnior (born 1980), Brazilian football coach
- Cícero Lucena (born 1957), Brazilian politician and businessman
- Cicero Mitchell (fl. 1869–1878), American politician
- Cícero Moraes (born 1982), Brazilian 3D designer
- Cícero Nobre (born 1992), Brazilian Paralympic javelin thrower
- Cícero Ramalho (born 1964), Brazilian footballer
- Cícero Sandroni (1935–2025), Brazilian journalist and writer
- Cícero Santos (born 1984), known as Cícero (footballer), Brazilian footballer
- Cícero Semedo (born 1986), Guinea-Bissauan footballer in Portugal
- Cícero Pompeu de Toledo (1910–1959), Brazilian president of São Paulo FC (1947–1958)
- Cícero Tortelli (born 1967), Brazilian swimmer
