= Cicerone =

Historical profession

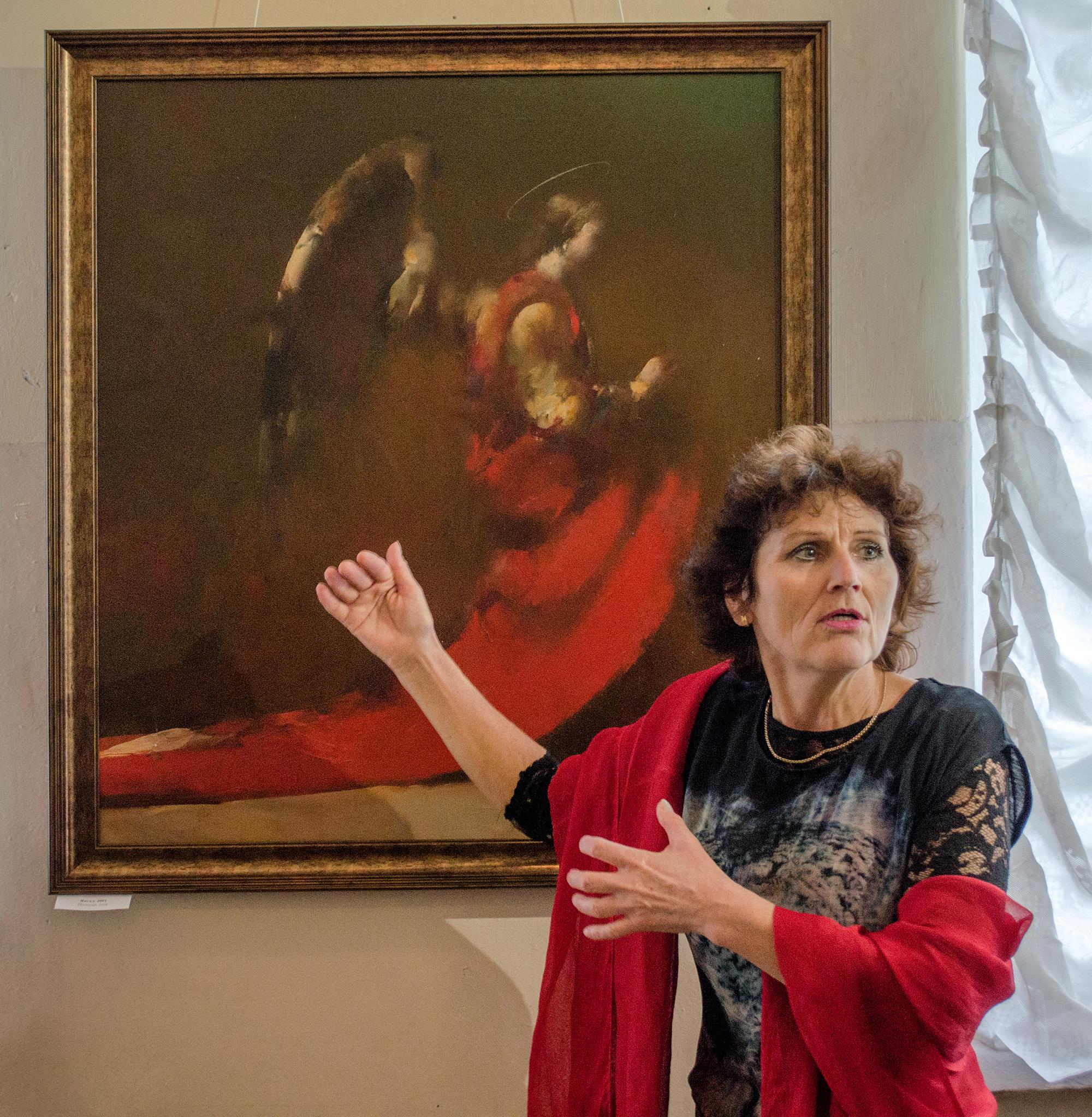
A guide in a museum

Cicerone (/ˌtʃɪtʃəˈroʊni, ˌsɪsəˈ-/ CHITCH-ə-ROH-nee, SISS-) is an old term for a guide who conducts visitors and sightseers to museums, galleries, etc., and explains matters of archaeological, antiquarian, historic or artistic interest. The word is presumably taken from Marcus Tullius Cicero, as a type of learning and eloquence. The Oxford English Dictionary finds recorded examples of the use earlier in English than Italian, the earliest quotation being from Joseph Addison's Dialogue on Medals (published posthumously 1726). It appears that the word was first applied to learned antiquarians who showed and explained to foreigners the antiquities and curiosities of the country (quotation of 1762 in the New English Dictionary).

"The Cicerones", a short story by Robert Aickman (turned into a 2002 short film), uses the idea of cicerones as people who conduct visitors and sightseers as a metaphor in a tale about a man who is guided to his doom by various characters in a cathedral.

In his travel book, William Lithgow (1632) pointed out the usefulness of the tourist guides (cicerones): "To be briefe, I saw the decayed house of worthy Cicero, the high Capitoll, the Pallace of cruell Nero, the Statues of Marcus Aurelius, Alexander, and his horse Bucephalus" (Ι.16).

== See also ==
- Dragoman
- Bear-leader (guide)
- Museum docent
- Beer sommelier (known as cicerone in the US)
- Grand Tour
