= Charles J. Hagen =

American politician

Charles J. Hagen was a member of the Wisconsin State Assembly.

== Biography ==
Hagen was born on March 12, 1862, in Lomira (town), Wisconsin. In 1882, he moved to Black Creek (town), Wisconsin. Hagen later moved to Appleton, Wisconsin, in 1910. Pursuits he followed include serving as president of a bank, a manufacturing company and an Evangelical church.

In 1885, Hagen married Louisa Machmiller. They had seven children before her death on August 7, 1899. The following year, Hagen married Mary Mack, with whom he had six more children. Hagen died on February 28, 1947.

== Political career ==
Hagen was elected to the Assembly in 1904 and 1906. He served as a Republican. Other positions he held include village president (similar to mayor) of Black Creek, Wisconsin, town clerk of Black Creek township, member of the Board of Supervisors of Outagamie County, Wisconsin, school board president and justice of the peace.
