= Black Creek, Wisconsin =

- Village
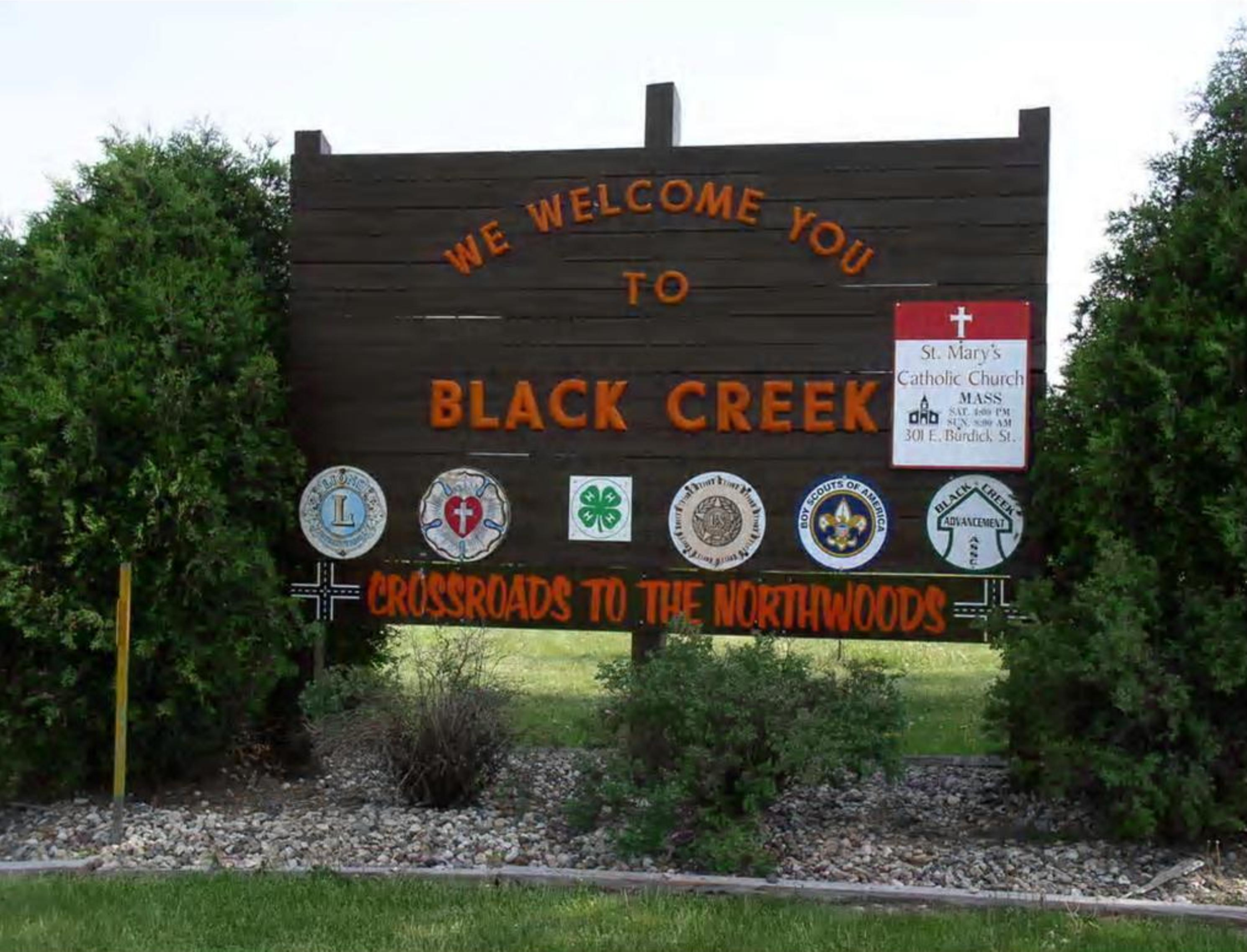
- Village gateway sign (Pre-2017)
- Nickname: "Crossroads to the Northwoods" "Birthplace of the First Organized Baseball Team"
- Location of Black Creek in Outagamie County, Wisconsin.
- Coordinates: 44°27′30″N 88°27′21″W
- Country: United States
- State: Wisconsin
- County: Outagamie
- Settled: 1862
- Incorporated: 1904

Government
  - Type: President – Trustees
  - President: Andrew Gleason
  - Clerk: Barbara Schuh
  - Village Board: Trustees: Tyler Rasmussen; Cory Johnson; Shannon Blaeis; Rebecca Bird; Timothy Diermeier; Justin Stingle

Area
  - Total: 1.00 sq mi (2.59 km^{2})
  - Land: 1.00 sq mi (2.58 km^{2})
  - Water: 0.0077 sq mi (0.02 km^{2})
- Elevation: 804 ft (245 m)

Population (2020)
  - Total: 1,357
  - Density: 1,357.0/sq mi (523.94/km^{2})
- Time zone: UTC-6 (Central (CST))
  - Summer (DST): UTC-5 (CDT)
- ZIP Codes: 54106
- Area code: (920)
- FIPS code: 55-07750
- GNIS feature ID: 1582819
- Website: villageofblackcreek.com

Black Creek is a village in north-central Outagamie County, Wisconsin, United States. The population was 1,357 at the 2020 census. The village is located within the Town of Black Creek, but is governed independently. Origins of the community trace back to 1862 when it was settled by American Civil War veteran, Thomas J. Burdick and his son, Abraham. Initially, the village had been referred to as Middleburg, due to its geographical proximity to Green Bay, Shawano, and Appleton. However, the name was later changed to "Black Creek" to reflect the dark-colored creek along the outskirts of the community with village incorporation in 1904. Today, Black Creek hosts a variety of community events including the annual Family Daze celebration.

== History ==
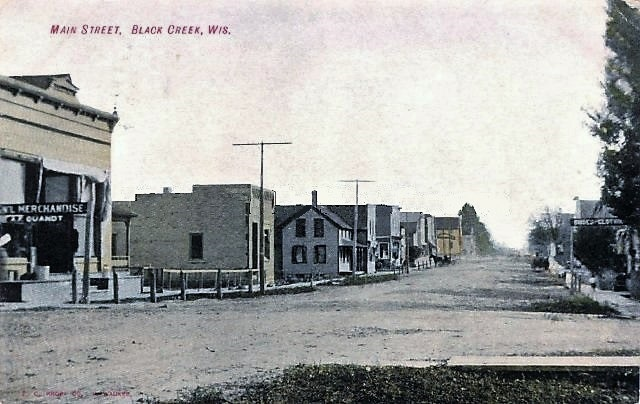
Main Street looking south from present day WIS 54 & WIS 47 intersection c.1907

In the Menominee language, Black Creek is known as Enāēnohnyah, "Little Walks Plainly", which is a man's name. The territory where Black Creek is today was originally occupied by several different Native American nations. The Menominee ceded the territory in the 1836 Treaty of the Cedars, while the Ho-Chunk were pressured into selling their land and illegally removed from the area before the eight year grace period guaranteed in their 1837 treaty.

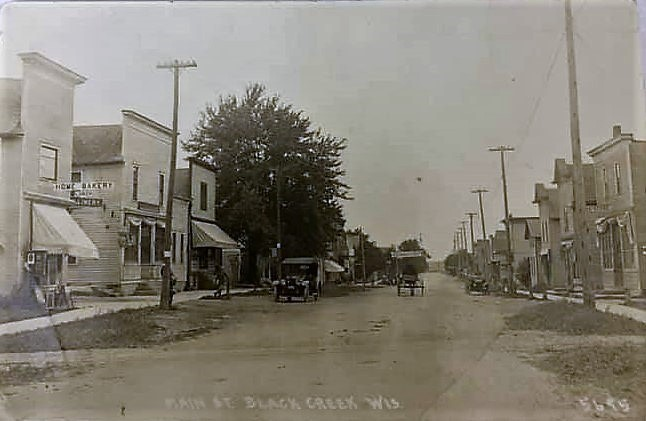
Main Street looking north from former east-west rail crossing c.1917

The village of Black Creek was then settled by American Civil War veteran, Thomas J. Burdick and his son, Abraham L. Burdick, in 1862. The community had been known as Middleburg, due to its geographical proximity to the larger communities of Green Bay, Shawano, and Appleton. With village incorporation in 1904, the settlement was renamed "Black Creek" to reflect the dark-colored creek along the northern edge of the community. Black Creek's first village president was, politician and businessman, Charles J. Hagen.

In 1869, the country's first organized baseball team was formed in Black Creek by L.J. Cook. Thus, the village is known as the birthplace of Wisconsin baseball. At the time, the team played at the village's North Park. It was a part of the Dairyland League before the team disbanded in the mid-1990s. Black Creek's major rivalries were with the Navarino Rangers and the Nichols Nitros. To commemorate the village's baseball history, a "Grudge Match" softball game is played annually.

After the arrival of the Green Bay and Lake Pepin Railroad in 1871, the small lumbering settlement soon developed into a trade and shipping center for local farm and dairy products with the establishment of Black Creek Creamery in 1894 and Borden's Condensery in 1917.

The village library was formed in 1901. The following year, 1902, a large fire destroyed part of the community, leading to the construction of the village fire department in 1904. In 1910, telephone service was made available to residents, with electricity making its debut in 1915. A north-south route of the Soo Line Railroad was constructed through the community in 1917.

The Black Creek area was formerly the nation's leader in sauerkraut production. Thus, the village has supported multiple sauerkraut production facilities since the late 1880s until Frank Pure Food Company and Wolf River Kraut ceased operations in the village during the mid-1990s.

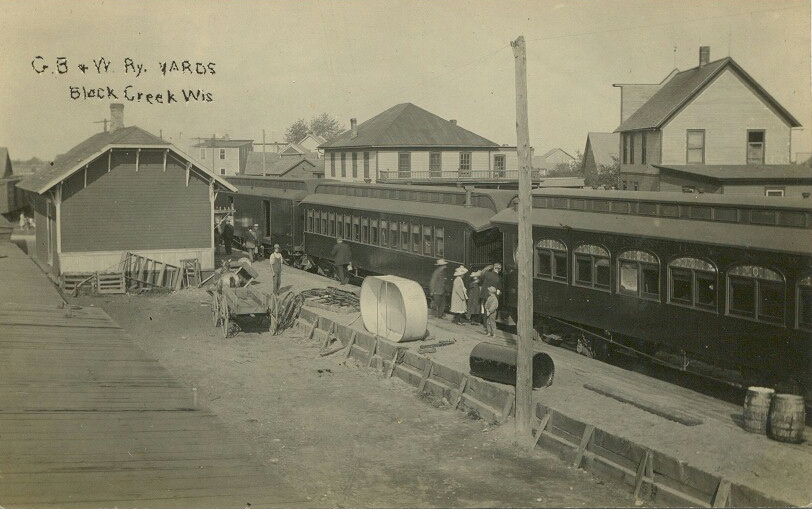
Original Green Bay & Western Railyards along Railroad Street c.1909

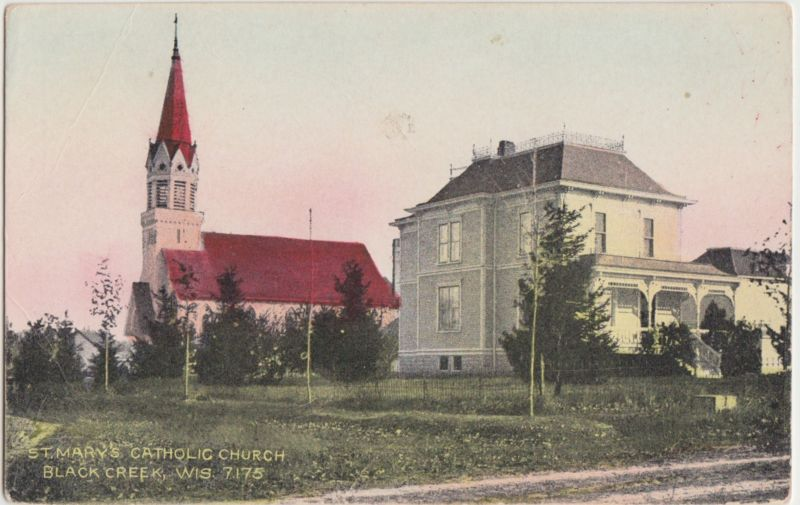
St. Mary's Roman Catholic Parish from E. Burdick Street c.1910

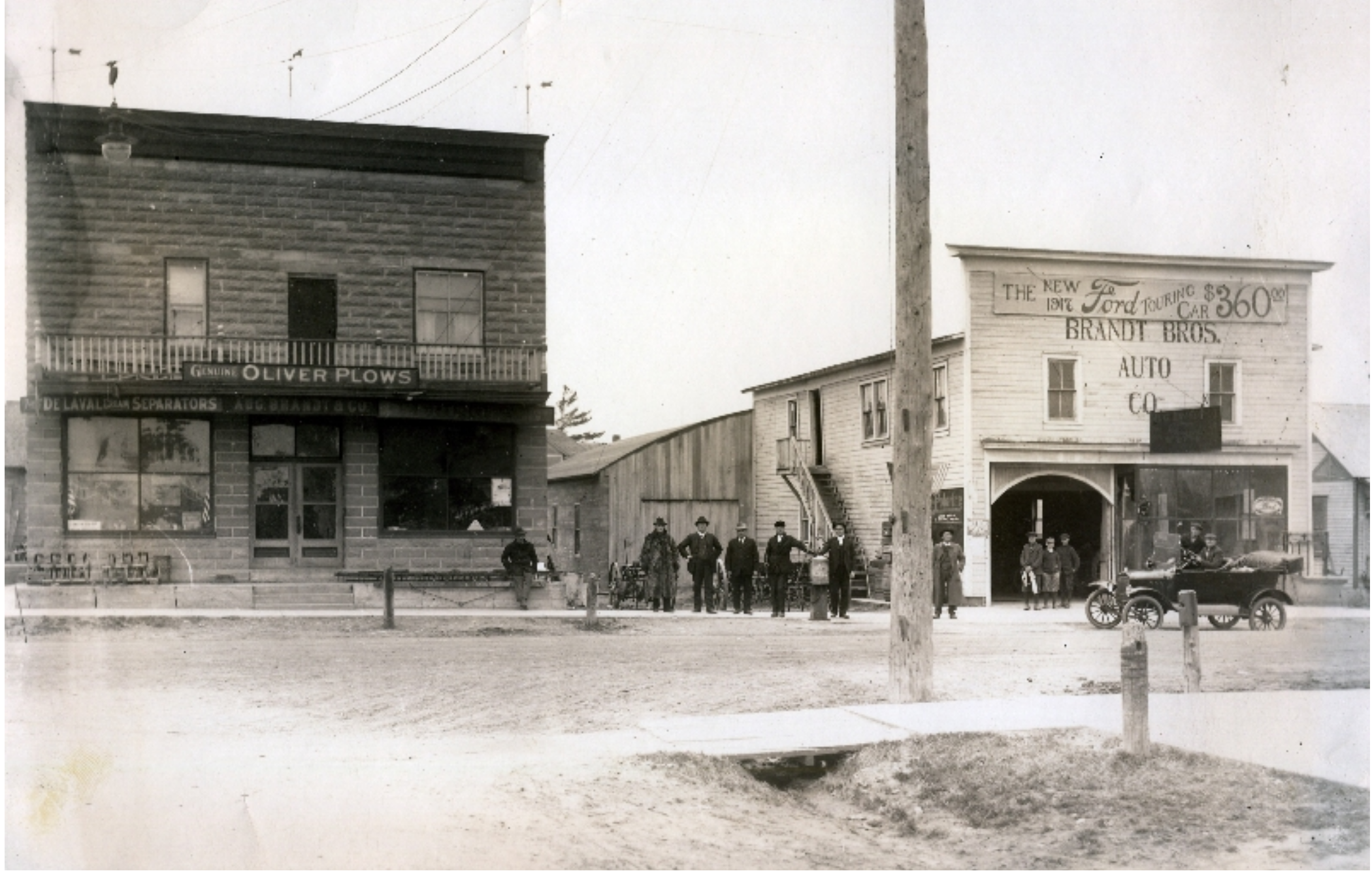
Brandt Bros. Hardware & Auto Co. at 301 and 303 N. Main Street c.1917

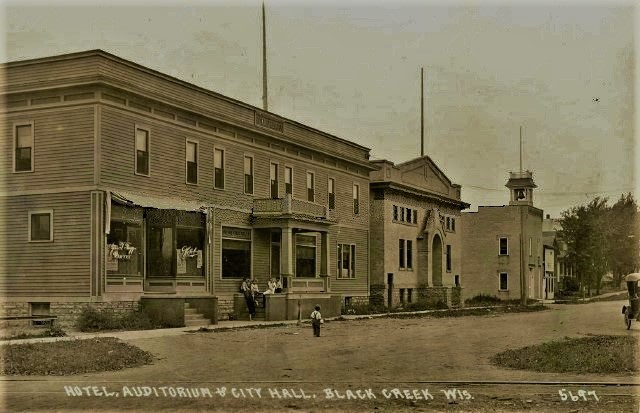
Hotel Arlington, Auditorium, and Village Hall/Fire Dept. along Maple Street c.1917

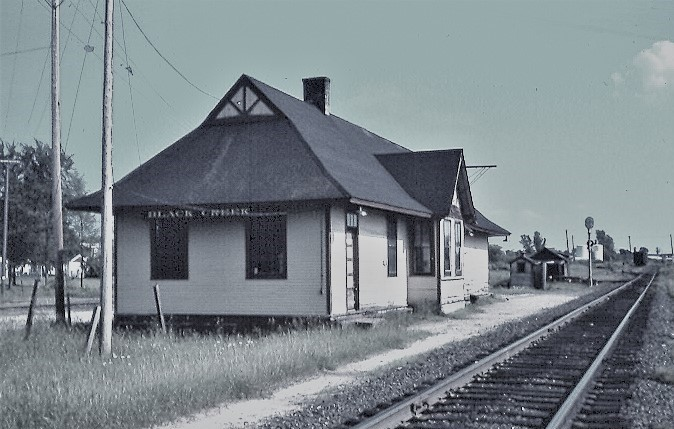
Former SOO Line train depot at the end of W. Forest Street c.1970

== Geography ==
=== Geography ===
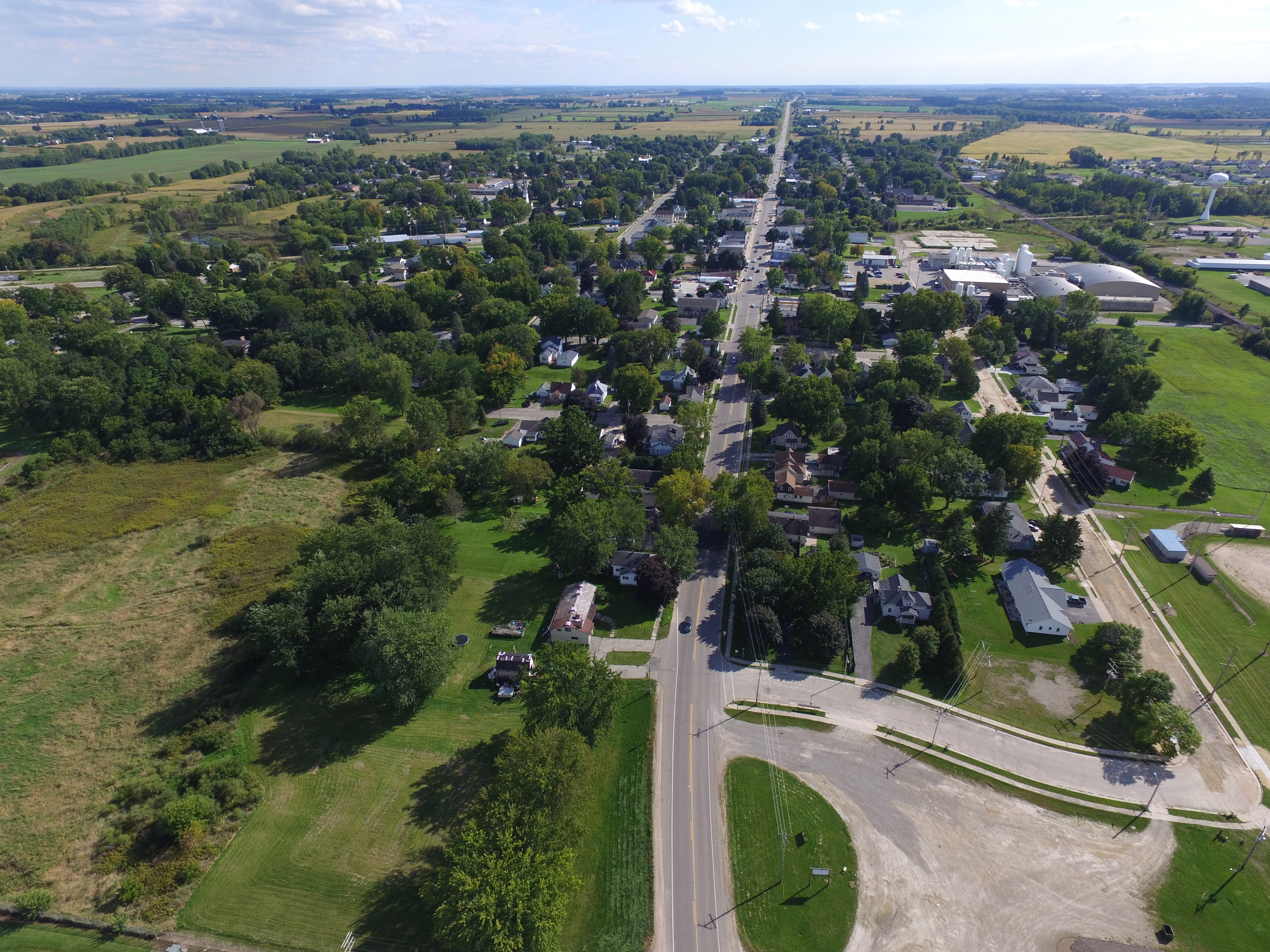
An aerial photo of Black Creek looking south down WIS 47

Black Creek is located at 44°28′28″N 88°27′0″W (44.474517, −88.450125). The northeastern Wisconsin community is situated at the intersection of WIS-47 and WIS-54, approximately 20 miles (40 km) west of Green Bay and 15 miles (24 km) north of the Fox Cities. It is in the Central Plains and Eastern Ridges and Lowlands regions of Wisconsin.

According to the United States Census Bureau, the village has a total area of 1.04 square miles (2.69 km^{2}), of which 1.03 square miles (2.67 km^{2}) is land and 0.01 square miles (0.03 km^{2}) is water.

=== Climate ===
Black Creek has a humid continental climate (Köppen climate classification Dfb). Like other cities with this type of climate, there are four distinct seasons, often with severe or extreme variation between them in terms of temperature and precipitation. The village experiences warm, humid, frequently hot summers and long, cold and snowy winters. The variance in temperature and precipitation between months is severe and often extreme.

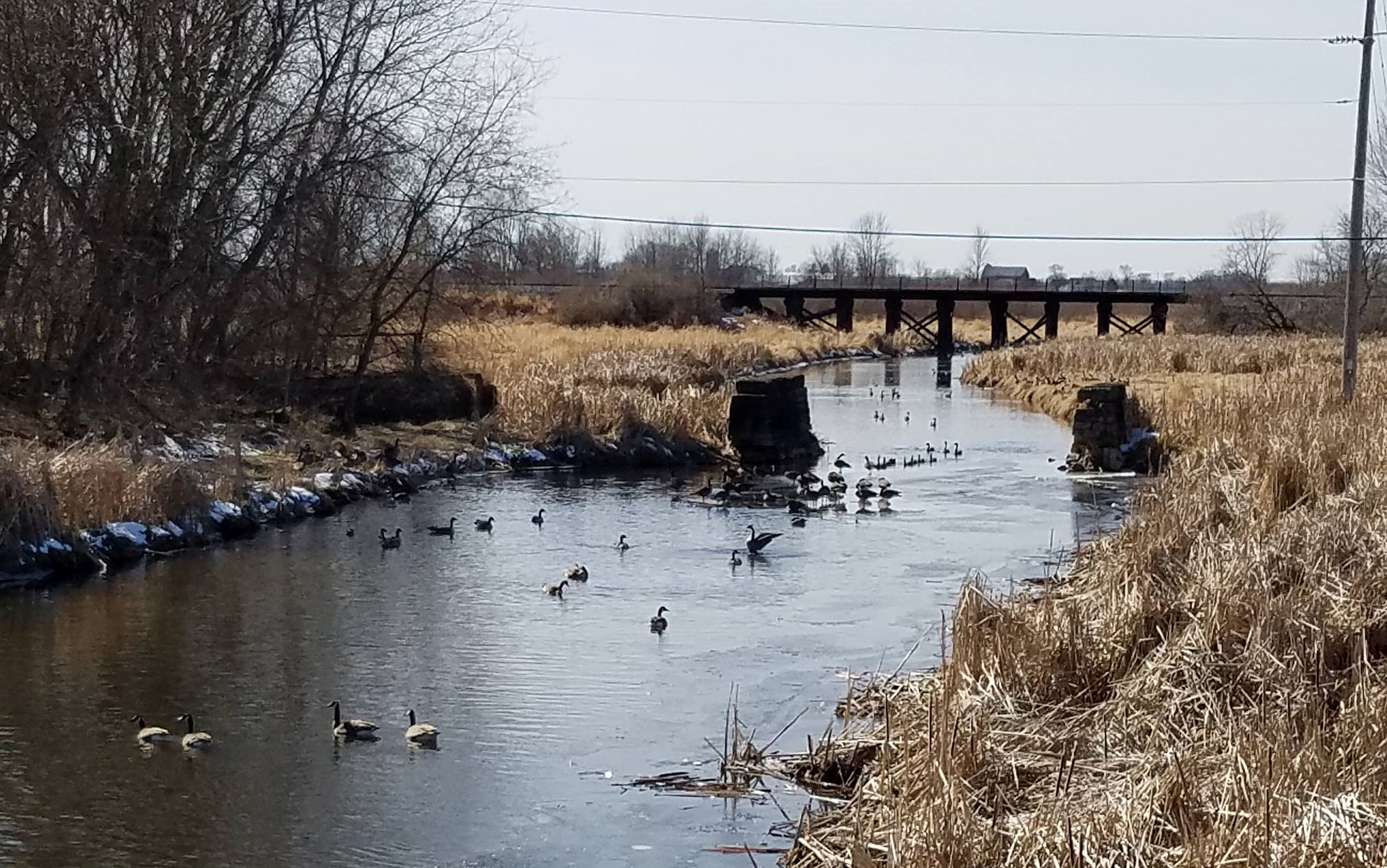
Black Creek along the village's northern edge

==== Temperature ====
Monthly mean temperatures range from 15 °F (−9.4 °C) in January to 70 °F (21.1 °C) in July. In July, the warmest month, the average high temperature is 81 °F (27.2 °C). There are 8 days of 90 °F (32 °C)+ highs, 163 days where the high remains at or below freezing annually. From December to February, even during thaws, the temperature rarely reaches 50 °F (10 °C). Extremes have ranged from −31 °F (−35 °C) to 99 °F (37 °C).

==== Precipitation ====
The wettest month in Black Creek is June when nearly 4 inches (101.6 mm) of precipitation falls, mostly in the form of rainfall from thunderstorms. The driest month in Black Creek is January when the majority of precipitation falls as low moisture-content snow due to cold, dry air. On average, 1 inch (25.4 mm) of precipitation falls in January.

==== Severe weather ====
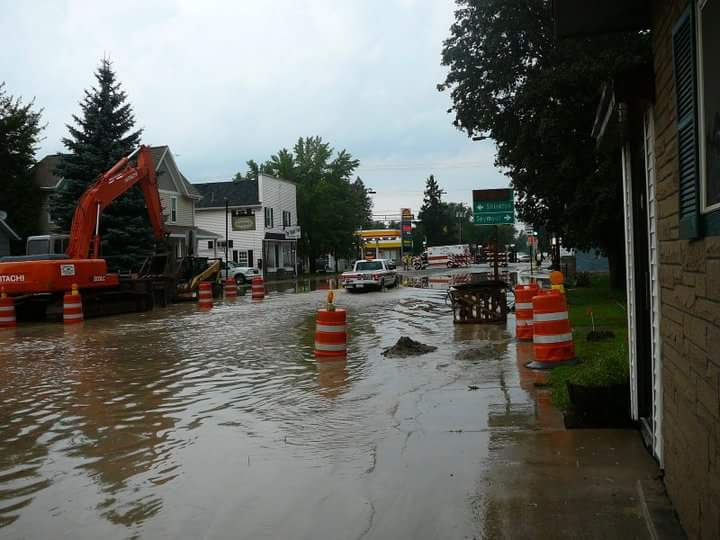
July 2010 flooding (Main Street)

There have been five tornadoes in the Black Creek area, ranging in intensity from F0 to F3. An F3 tornado touched down four miles from the WIS 54/WIS 47 intersection on June 26, 1969, and traveled northeast past Seymour, causing one injury. On December 1, 1970, an F3 tornado touched down in Hortonville, traveled northeast and stopped 2.5 miles from the center of Black Creek. On May 30, 1980, an F1 tornado touched down 1.5 miles from the center of the village and traveled eastward across the village. A F2 tornado touched down in Stephensville on May 6, 1982, 10 miles from the center of Black Creek, and traveled northeast, stopping just outside the village limits. The most recent tornado, rated F0, touched down briefly just north of Black Creek on June 13, 2005.

In the summer of 2010, Black Creek experienced two major flooding events. The first occurred on the morning of July 19 when 4 inches (100 mm) of rain fell in 20 minutes and the second during the evening of August 20 when the community received another 6 inches (150 mm). Other flooding events in the past only affected the Canadian National Railway underpass.

Climate data for Black Creek, Wisconsin
Month	Jan	Feb	Mar	Apr	May	Jun	Jul	Aug	Sep	Oct	Nov	Dec	Year
Record high °F (°C)	56 (13)	61 (16)	82 (28)	89 (32)	99 (37)	101 (38)	104 (40)	100 (38)	97 (36)	88 (31)	74 (23)	64 (18)	104 (40)
Mean daily maximum °F (°C)	24 (−4)	28 (−2)	39 (4)	54 (12)	66 (19)	75 (24)	80 (27)	78 (26)	70 (21)	57 (14)	42 (6)	29 (−2)	54 (12)
Daily mean °F (°C)	15 (−9)	19 (−7)	29 (−2)	44 (7)	55 (13)	65 (18)	70 (21)	68 (20)	59 (15)	48 (9)	34 (1)	21 (−6)	44 (7)
Mean daily minimum °F (°C)	9 (−13)	13 (−11)	22 (−6)	34 (1)	44 (7)	54 (12)	59 (15)	57 (14)	49 (9)	38 (3)	27 (−3)	14 (−10)	35 (2)
Record low °F (°C)	−36 (−38)	−33 (−36)	−29 (−34)	7 (−14)	21 (−6)	32 (0)	40 (4)	38 (3)	24 (−4)	8 (−13)	−12 (−24)	−27 (−33)	−36 (−38)
Average rainfall inches (mm)	1.13 (29)	1.16 (29)	1.85 (47)	2.63 (67)	2.93 (74)	3.88 (99)	3.5 (89)	3.37 (86)	3.04 (77)	2.44 (62)	2.13 (54)	1.51 (38)	29.57 (751)
Average snowfall inches (cm)	12.1 (31)	10 (25)	9.3 (24)	6 (15)	0.1 (0.25)	0 (0)	0 (0)	0 (0)	0 (0)	0.2 (0.51)	8 (20)	12 (30)	57.7 (145.76)
Average precipitation days	10	8	11	11	11	10	10	10	10	9	9	11	120
Average snowy days	9	8	7	2	0	0	0	0	0	0	4	9	39
Average relative humidity (%)	72.5	72	72	66.5	65.5	68.5	70.5	74	74	72	74.5	75.5	71.5
Percentage possible sunshine	44	52	53	58	63	66	66	65	60	61	42	44	56
Source 1: My Forecast Historical Almanac
Source 2: Weather Channel

== Demographics ==
Historical population
Census	Pop.	Note	%±
1910	516		—
1920	516		0.0%
1930	526		1.9%
1940	542		3.0%
1950	650		19.9%
1960	707		8.8%
1970	921		30.3%
1980	1,097		19.1%
1990	1,152		5.0%
2000	1,192		3.5%
2010	1,316		10.4%
2020	1,357		3.1%
U.S. Decennial Census

=== 2020 census ===
As of the census of 2020, there were 1,357 people residing in the village. The population density was 1,357 inhabitants per square mile (523.9/km^{2}) with 545 housing units. The racial makeup of the village was 92% White, 1.2% Native American, 0.3% Asian, 0.5% from other races, and 4.3% from two or more races. Hispanic or Latino of any race were 1.5% of the population.

=== 2010 census ===
As of the census of 2010, there were 1,316 people, 513 households, and 354 families residing in the village. The population density was 1,277.7 inhabitants per square mile (493.3/km^{2}). There were 540 housing units at an average density of 524.3 per square mile (202.4/km^{2}). The racial makeup of the village was 96.0% White, 1.4% Native American, 0.2% Asian, 0.8% from other races, and 1.6% from two or more races. Hispanic or Latino of any race were 2.1% of the population.

There were 513 households, of which 38.4% had children under the age of 18 living with them, 53.4% were married couples living together, 10.3% had a female householder with no husband present, 5.3% had a male householder with no wife present, and 31.0% were non-families. 22.0% of all households were made up of individuals, and 6.9% had someone living alone who was 65 years of age or older. The average household size was 2.57 and the average family size was 3.03.

The median age in the village was 32.2 years. 29.3% of residents were under the age of 18; 7.7% were between the ages of 18 and 24; 31.5% were from 25 to 44; 22.2% were from 45 to 64; and 9.3% were 65 years of age or older. The gender makeup of the village was 49.9% male and 50.1% female.

=== 2000 census ===
As of the census of 2000, there were 1,192 people, 485 households, and 335 families residing in the village. The population density was 1,145.5 people per square mile (442.5/km^{2}). There were 513 housing units at an average density of 493.0 per square mile (190.5/km^{2}). The racial makeup of the village was 97.73% White, 1.01% Native American, 0.08% Asian, 0.08% from other races, and 1.09% from two or more races. 1.09% of the population were Hispanic or Latino of any race.

There were 485 households, out of which 33.2% had children under the age of 18 living with them, 55.1% were married couples living together, 10.9% had a female householder with no husband present, and 30.9% were non-families. 23.9% of all households were made up of individuals, and 11.3% had someone living alone who was 65 years of age or older. The average household size was 2.46 and the average family size was 2.93.

In the village, the population was spread out, with 24.4% under the age of 18, 10.6% from 18 to 24, 31.5% from 25 to 44, 20.4% from 45 to 64, and 13.2% who were 65 years of age or older. The median age was 34 years. For every 100 females, there were 89.2 males. For every 100 females age 18 and over, there were 88.9 males.

The median income for a household in the village was $42,946, and the median income for a family was $49,896. Males had a median income of $32,128 versus $25,286 for females. The per capita income for the village was $18,226. About 5.2% of families and 7.1% of the population were below the poverty line, including 7.7% of those under age 18 and 5.7% of those age 65 or over.

== Economy ==
As of 2010, the largest private-sector employers in the village were:

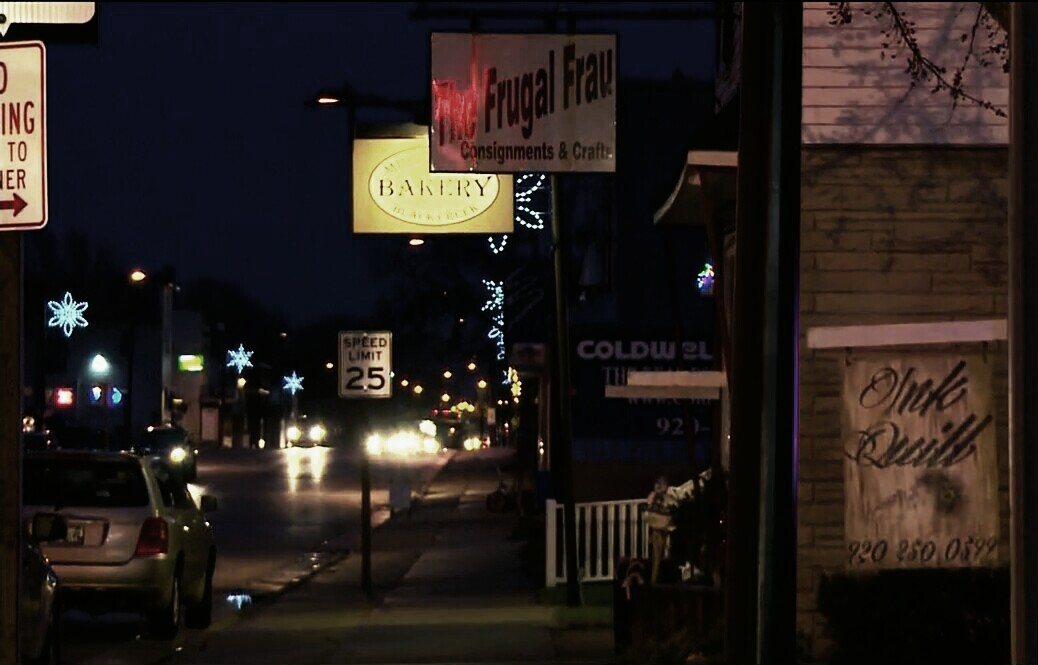
Downtown Christmas lighting

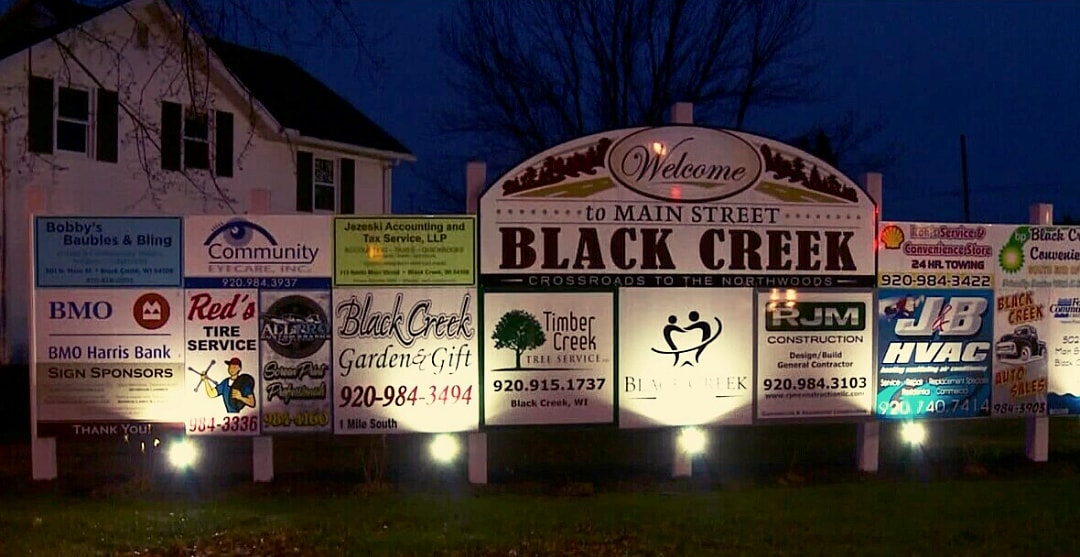
Main Street business league signage

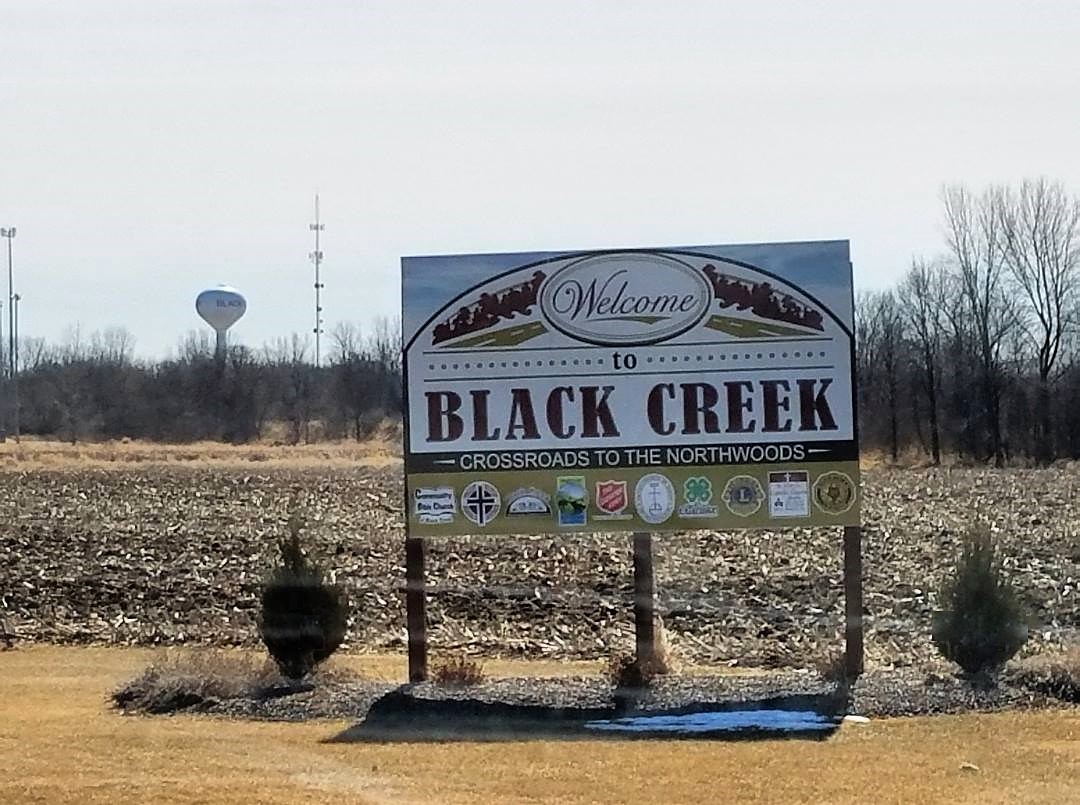
Gateway signage installed in 2017

#	Employer	# of employees
1	Saputo – Black Creek Classic Division	100–249
2	Ralph's Hardwood Floors Company Inc	20–49
3	Sal's Foods Center Inc	20–49
4	Brick's Supper Club 47	10–19
5	O J Krull & Sons Fur Farm Inc	10–19
6	Sam Sommers Concrete	10–19
7	Ron's Service Center Inc	10–19
8	Badgerland Buildings Inc	10–19
9	RJM Construction, LLC	10–19
10	Black Creek Convenience Inc	10–19

=== Main Street revitalization efforts ===
In the summer of 2011, the "Open for Business" Campaign was begun by the village and area business association in an effort to attract new businesses. The goal is to revitalize the community and the downtown area. The campaign is encouraging structural face-lifts and the growth of new specialty shops to help attract tourists traveling through to the Northwoods.

==== Capstone project ====
Towards the end of 2013, the Black Creek Business Association partnered with a UW–Madison student to conduct a community needs assessment. A survey of residents showed that what most wanted was a sense of community, with an atmosphere of a small town and an emphasis on "mom & pop shops." Residents expressed an interest in an increase in food choices, the addition of flower planters and trees, making village streets more biker friendly, more parking areas, and slowing traffic on Main Street.

Additionally, a desire from residents to restore and preserve historic buildings is present throughout the study. It was suggested that the community utilize an empty lot adjacent to the state trail for a new community center that would host indoor and outdoor events. In addition to this, a new Veterans park, extended trail systems, and the addition of decorative lighting would be added to the downtown area. Together, with a UW-Extension consultant, the board devised an eight-step plan for recruiting new businesses.

== Arts and culture ==
=== Major events ===
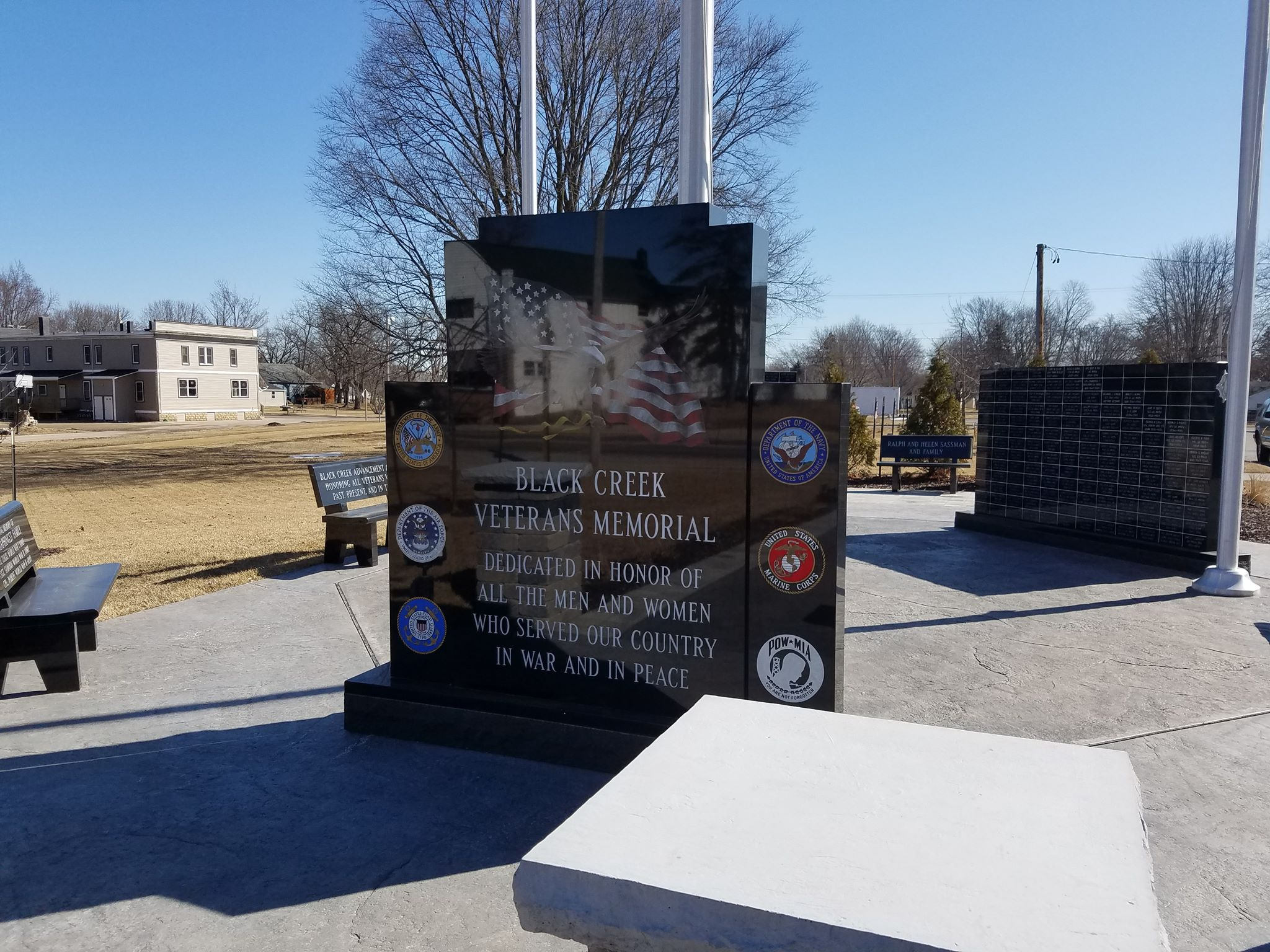
Duhm-Masch American Legion Memorial

- Semiannual Village-Wide Rummage Sale
- Annual Family Daze Festival - formerly "Homecoming"
  - Antique vehicle show, parade, craft fair, & Softball Grudge Match
- Annual Altrusa Polkafest
- Annual 3K Bobcat Glow Run
- Annual 5K Run for the Timbers
- Annual Community Christmas Festival

Black Creek also supports a Citizen of the Year Award and banquet in recognition of residents actively involved within the community.

=== Veterans memorial ===
In May 2013, Black Creek Advancement Association and Duhm-Masch American Legion Post 332 announced they would create a veterans memorial in Black Creek. The memorial was officially dedicated August 2017.

=== National Register of Historic Places ===
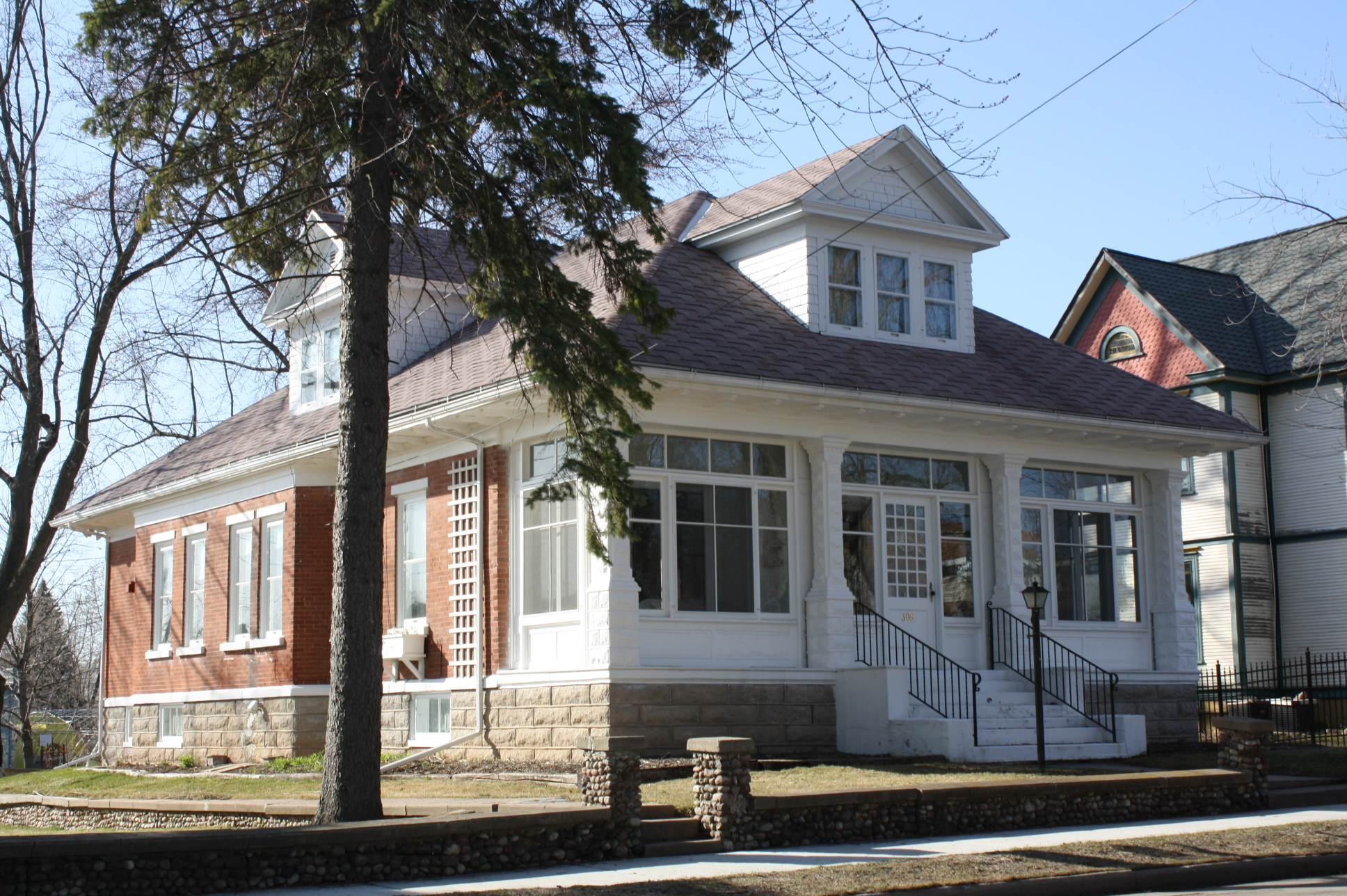
George Peters residence

The George Peters House, located at 305 North Maple Street in Black Creek, 44°28′37″N 88°26′59″W, is on the National Register of Historic Places and the Wisconsin State Register of Historic Places.

It is in an area of Black Creek where buildings range from 100 to 180 years old.

The historic Hotel Arlington is located just down the street from this residence, located across the street is the Black Creek Founders Memorial next to the Newton Blackmour State Trail.

Also located in this area is the historic Immanuel Evangelical Lutheran Church (named Evangelische Lutheran Immanuel's Kirche) and the downtown business district.

== Recreation ==
Three village parks are officially open from April 1 to October 15 (weather permitting).

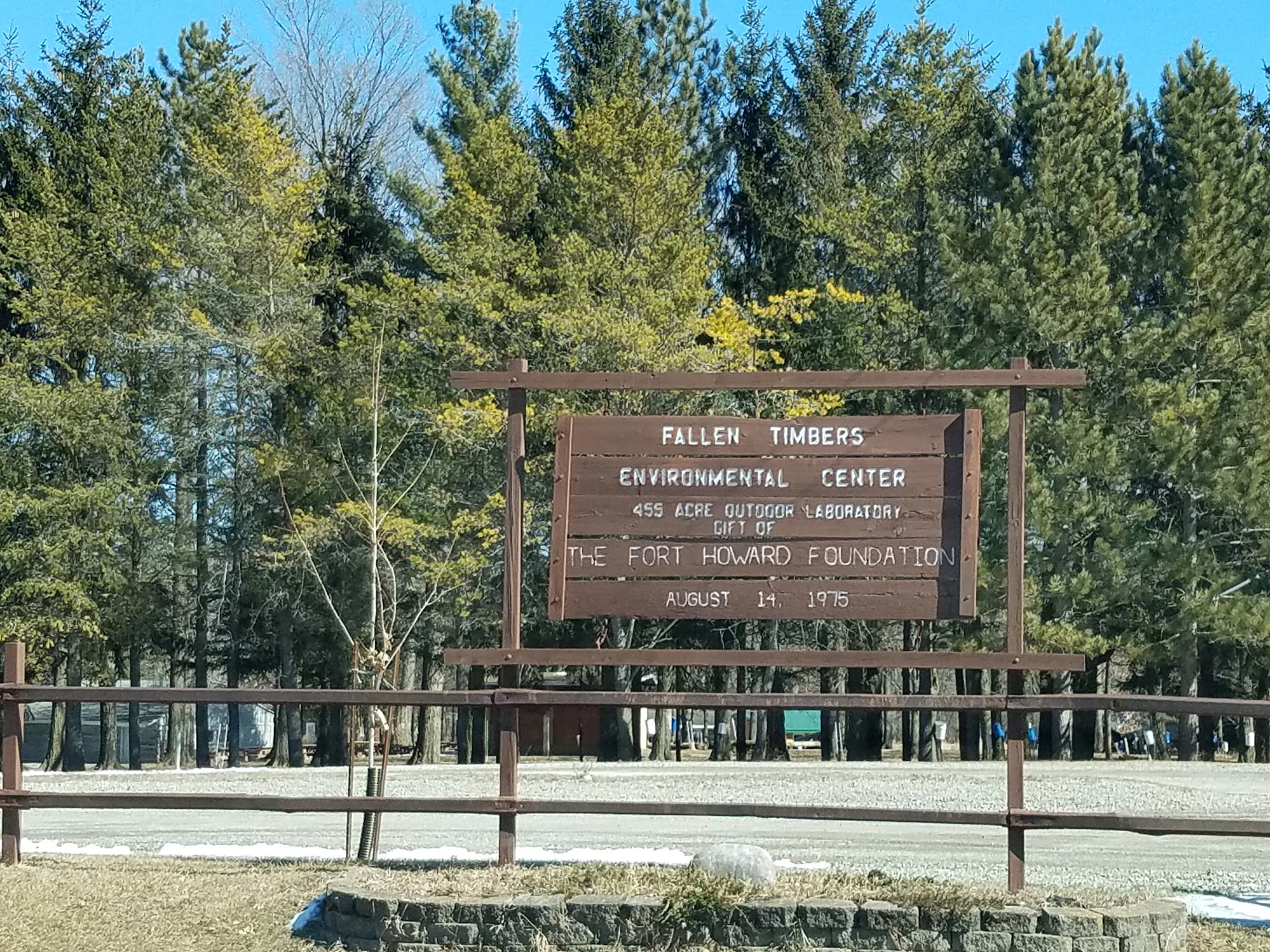
Fallen Timbers Environmental Center signage

- Lake (Bartmann) Park is 11 acres (40,468 m^{2}) and includes a swimming hole, playground, pavilions, horseshoe pits, and a disc golf course.
- North Park, six acres (20,234 m^{2}), offers a baseball diamond.
- South (Sebald) Park is nine acres (28,327 m^{2}) and includes two baseball diamonds, batting cage, playground, pavilion, restrooms, water fight barrel, and a seasonal ice skating rink.

=== Tri-Rivers Nature Area ===
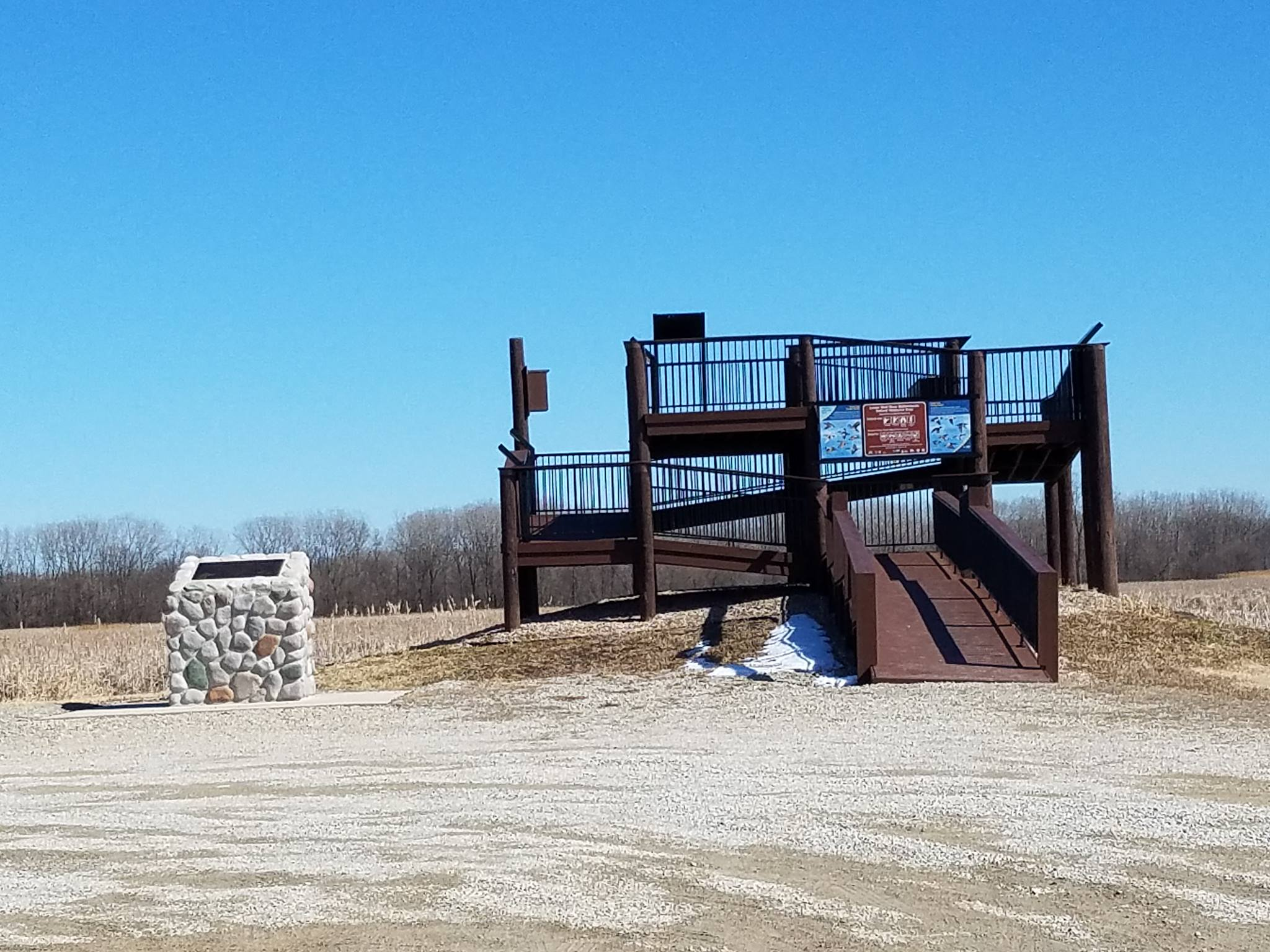
Mack State Wildlife Area observation deck

The community is also within the far eastern portion of the Tri-Rivers Nature Area of Outagamie County, a region with a high concentration of public land and nature preserves. Two environmental nature preserves in the vicinity of Black Creek offer hiking and wildlife viewing opportunities.

- Fallen Timbers Environmental Education Center, a 456-acre (1,845,366 m^{2}) nature lab, preserves woodlands, meadows, ponds, and prairies. There are also 8.5 miles (13.68 km) of hiking and cross-country skiing trails
- Mack State Wildlife Area, 1,350-acres (5,463,256 m^{2}), preserves woodlands, marshlands, meadows, and swampland. It also offers birding opportunities for migrating Canada Geese, Sandhill Cranes, Great Blue Herons, and Tundra Swans.

=== Newton Blackmour State Trail ===
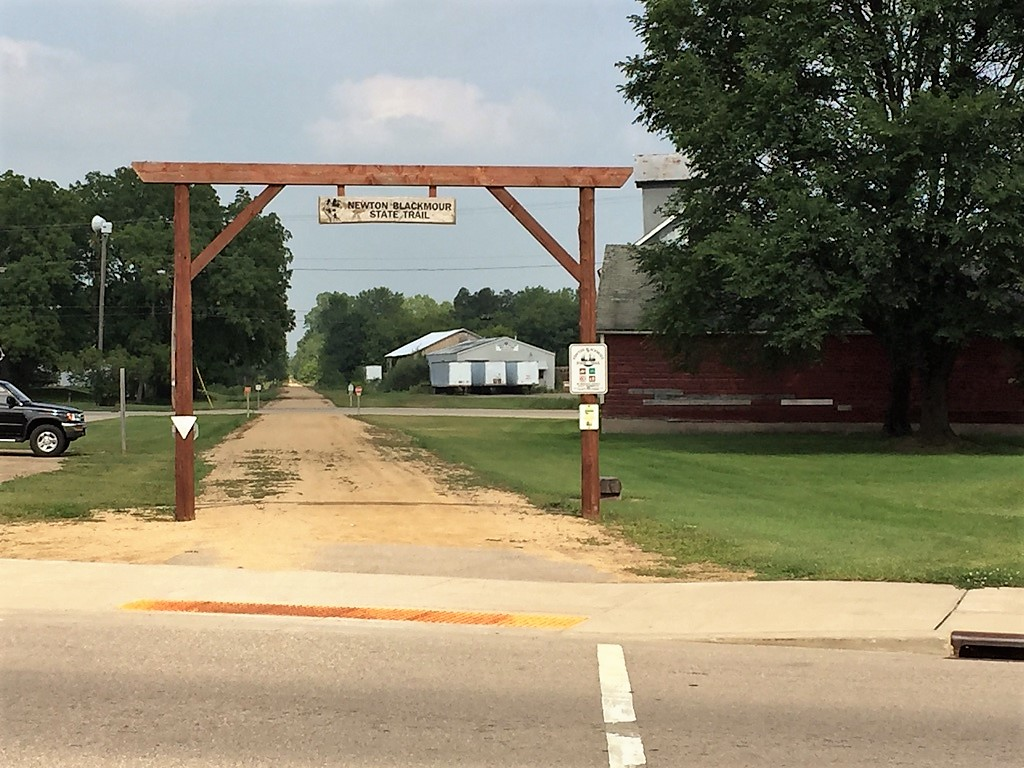
Newton Blackmour State Trailhead

The Newton Blackmour State Trail, part of the Rails-to-Trails Conservancy, runs through the community along the former Green Bay & Western railbed. The trail extends 24 miles (38.62 km) from Seymour to New London. It is used for snowmobiles, snowshoeing, and cross-country skiing in winter and hiking, biking and horseback riding during summer. The name, "Newton Blackmour," is derived from the four incorporated communities along the trail.

=== Sports ===
Black Creek Youth Sports Organization serves as the village's youth baseball league. The organization hosts tee ball (ages 5–6); machine pitch (ages 7–8); Little League (ages 9–12); and softball (ages 9–12). Teams are sponsored by local businesses. Softball and Little League teams play against other area communities, while tee ball and machine pitch teams play against other Black Creek teams.

Snowmobiling is a major winter activity in the Black Creek area when conditions permit. The village is within county snowmobile trail zones one, two, and seven and is crisscrossed by numerous trail routes.

The community is also served by the Black Creek Sportsman's Club which hosts trap shooting events during the week.

== Government ==
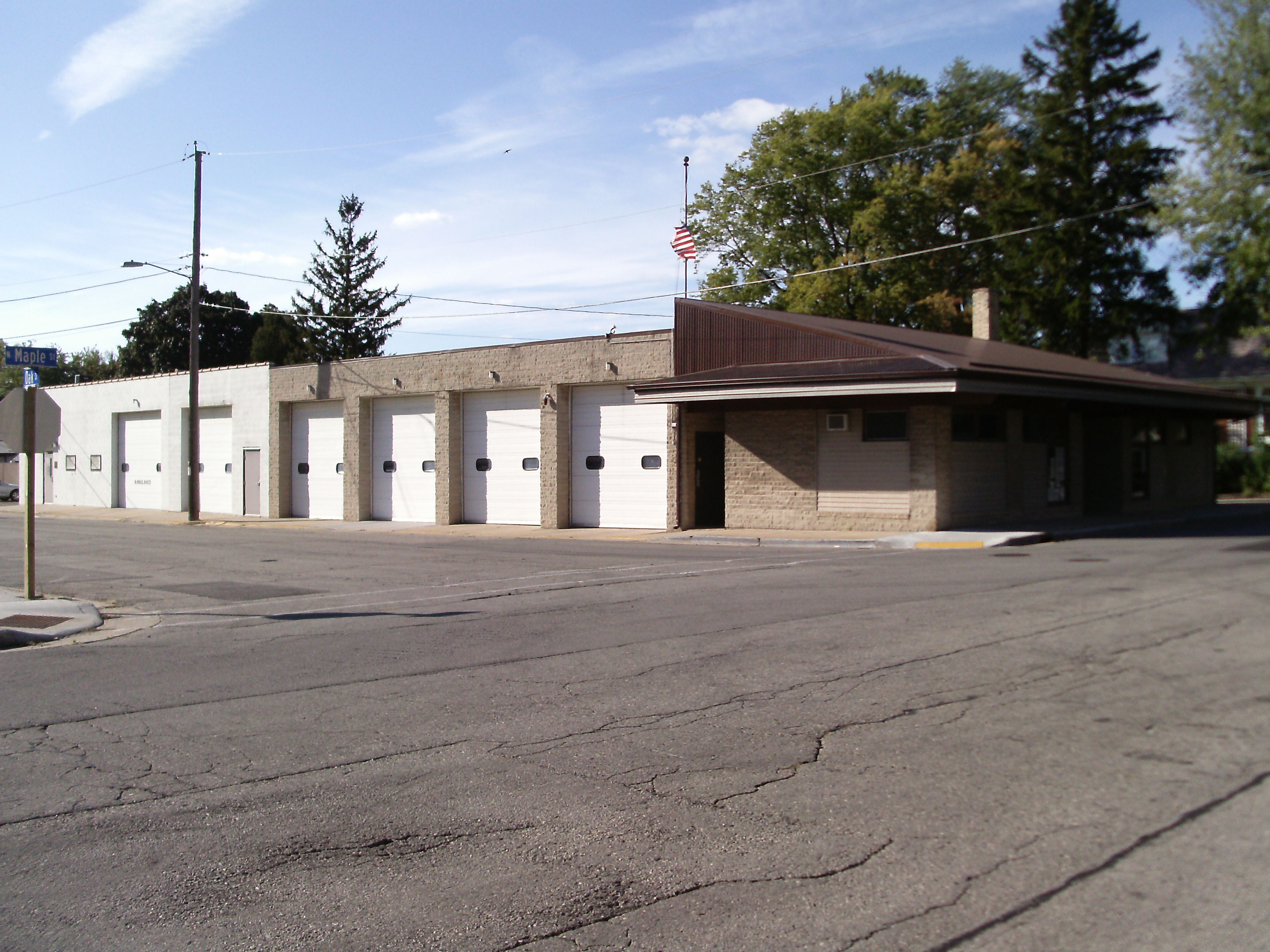
Village offices & police department

The village of Black Creek is governed by a board of six elected representative trustees and a president. Village staff includes a treasurer/clerk, deputy clerk, librarian, fire chief, custodian, WWTP operator, building inspector, municipal justice, assessor, and an attorney.

The elected board is responsible for establishing the tax rate, approving the budget, setting village policies, and establishing the strategic direction of the village. The president is responsible for making appointments to boards and commissions and for chairing the village board meetings. Committees consist of Finance, Courts and Public Safety, Buildings and Grounds, Insurance and Personnel, Planning Commission, Board of Review, Streets, Utility, Ordinance, and Zoning Board of Appeals.

The Black Creek Joint Municipal Court has jurisdiction over the villages of Black Creek, Bear Creek, and Nichols municipal code.

Law enforcement has been provided by the Outagamie County Sheriff's Office since August 2025, after the Black Creek Police Department ended service on July 31, 2025. Fire protection and rescue is provided by volunteers of the Black Creek Fire and Rescue Department, which has 46 firefighters, 9 EMTs, and 10 first responders.

Black Creek is in Wisconsin State Senate District 2, represented by Robert Cowles - R, Wisconsin State Assembly District 5, represented by Jim Steineke - R, and U.S. Congressional District 8, represented by Mike Gallagher - R.

=== Embezzlement investigation ===
In July 2019, charges were filed against the former Black Creek Rescue Service treasurer, Kathleen Pasch. The charges detail 11 counts of forgery and one count of theft in excess of 100,000 dollars against the organization.

Pasch allegedly forged numerous checks in the name of the village police chief, Lowell James. According to the criminal complaint, she also made numerous ATM withdrawals under the organization in excess of 130,000 dollars to fund a gambling habit from 2015 to 2018.

== Education ==
The village has one public school, Black Creek Elementary & Middle School, which has been a part of the Seymour Community School District since 1963. The village school serves grades pre-K through 8th.

Black Creek's original schoolhouse was constructed in 1874 and condemned in 1900. A replacement two-story school, built along present-day State Street (WIS 54), was used until 1954. Because of lack of space, the school system also rented the former community auditorium, along Maple Street, for various school functions from 1937 to 1957.

Today's village school was constructed in 1954. After a major building expansion in 1957, the one-room schoolhouses in the surrounding vicinity closed, and the students transferred to the grade school, doubling the enrollment. Kindergarten, art, music, and physical education programs were also added that year. Since then, the school has expanded in 1969, 1987, and 2008.

Seymour Community High School serves as the village and surrounding area high school.

The Black Creek Village Public Library is a member of the Outagamie Waupaca Library System (OWLS).

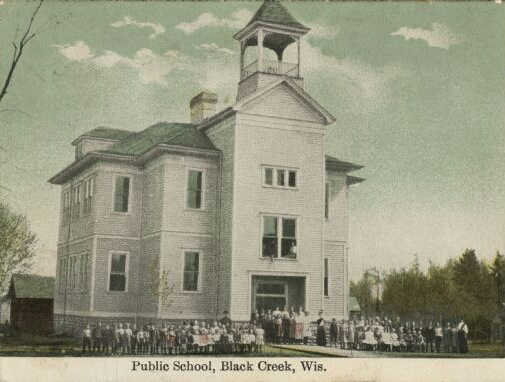
Four classroom public school along WIS 54 c.1909

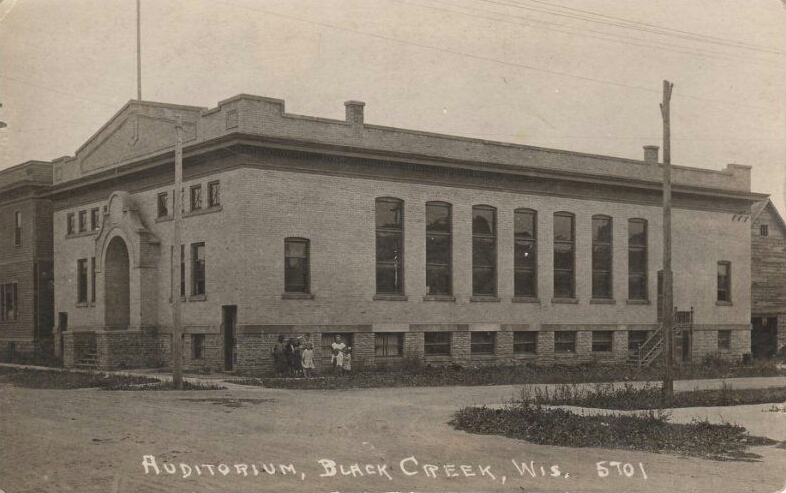
Former auditorium used for school & community functions c.1917

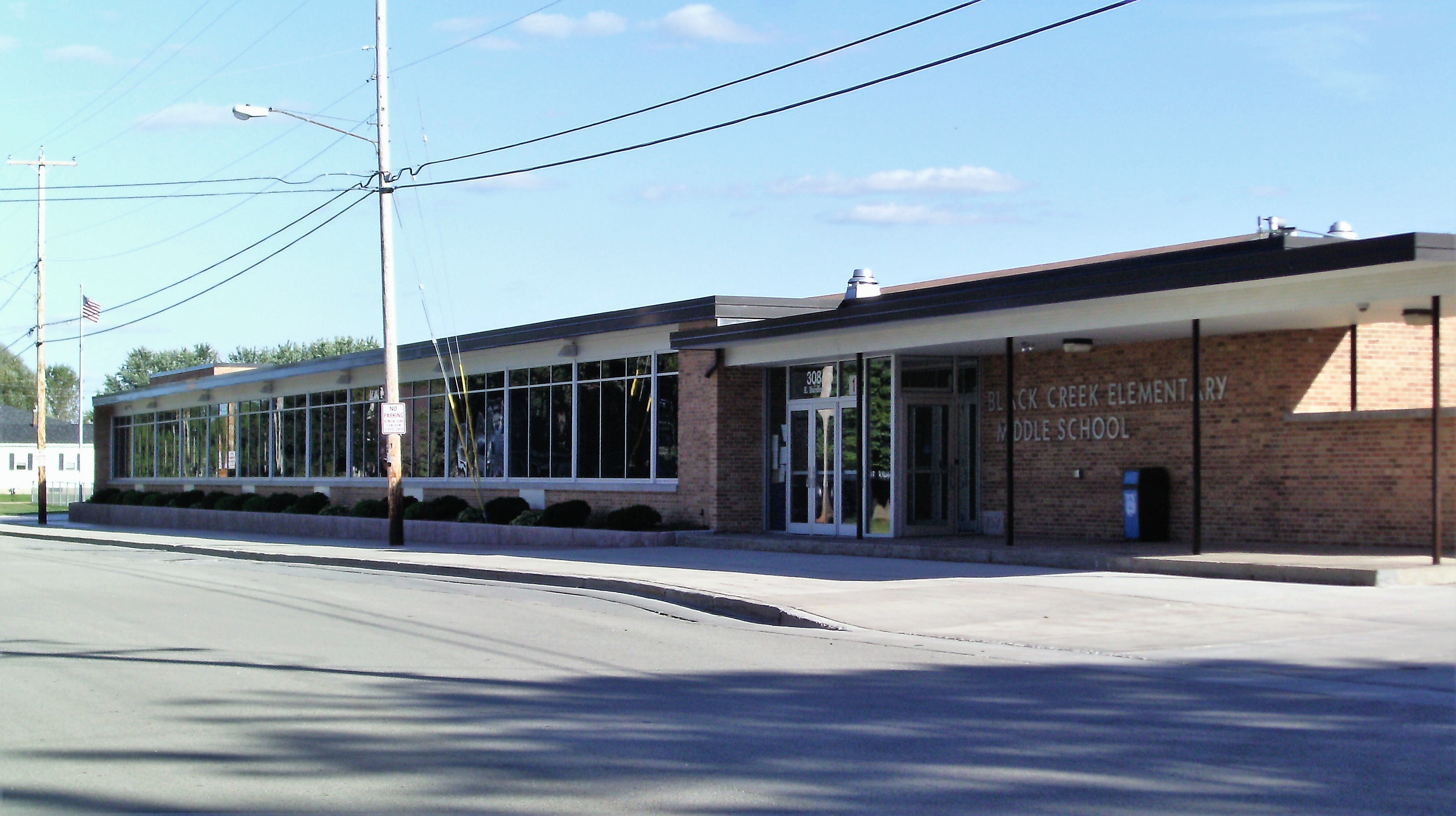
Black Creek Grade School

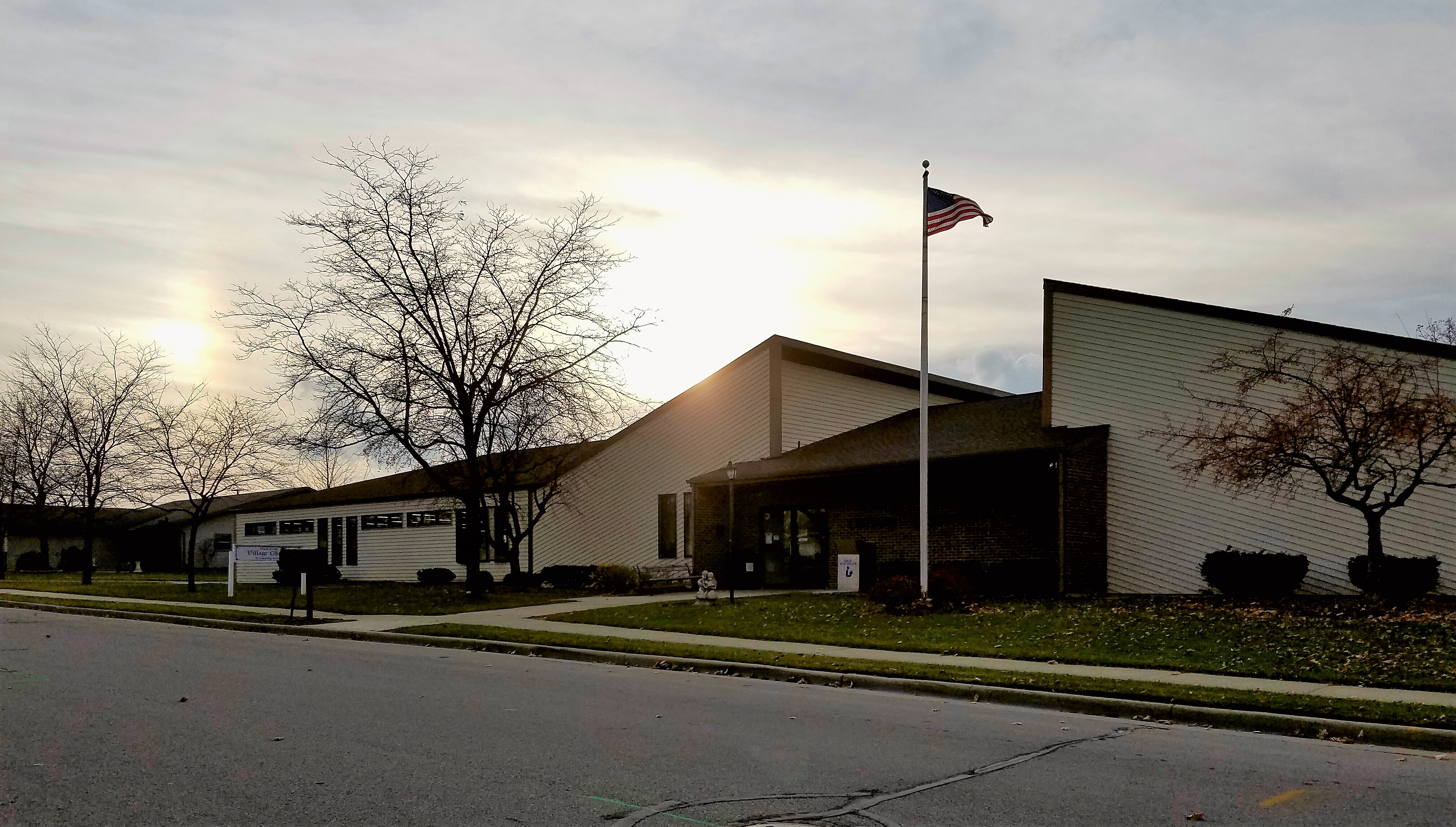
Village Library & Community Center

== Media ==
In 1875, Black Creek published its first newspaper, the Black Creek Journal, which was discontinued in 1880. The Black Creek Times Press was first issued in 1904 and discontinued in 1928.

Today, Black Creek is served by the Advertiser Community News~Times Press, based in Seymour, the Appleton Post-Crescent, and the Green Bay Press-Gazette.

The village is also served by Fox 11 WLUK-TV, NBC 26 WGBA-TV, CBS 5 WFRV-TV, and ABC 2 WBAY-TV. Numerous AM and FM radio stations throughout the surrounding area serve the community as well.

== Infrastructure ==
=== Highways and Rail ===
Black Creek has an average of 10,100 vehicles passing through daily, and 3.7 million per year. Approximately 8,200 vehicles pass through Black Creek's downtown area on average, and about 6,100 vehicles drive through the Wisconsin Highway 47 / Wisconsin Highway 54 intersection throughout the day. Burdick Street has about 740 vehicles traveling on it daily.

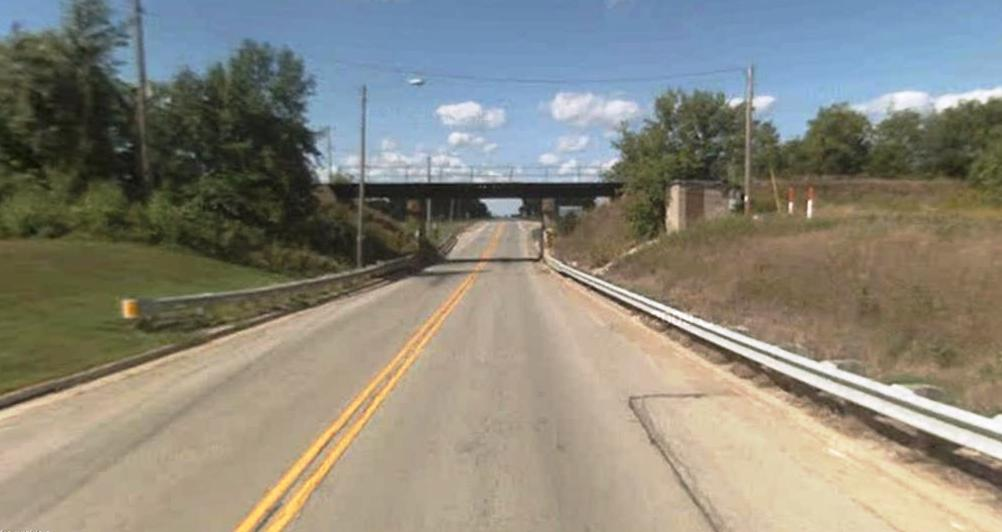
CN Railway underpass along Wisconsin Highway 54.

Wisconsin Highway 47, also marked as Main Street, northbound, intersects Wisconsin Highway 29 in Shawano. Southbound, Highway 47 connects to Interstate 41 in Appleton.
Wisconsin Highway 54, also marked State Street, Westward routes to Shiocton and Waupaca. Eastward Highway 54 routes to Seymour and intersects Interstate 41 and Interstate 43 in Green Bay.
County Trunk Highway B terminates in the west on the village's south side at Wisconsin Highway 47. Its eastern terminus is County Trunk Highway PP.
The Canadian National Railway, going northbound routes to and terminates in Shawano. Going southbound it routes to Appleton and the Chicago area.

=== Airports near Black Creek ===
Major airports near Black Creek include Austin Straubel International Airport in the village of Ashwaubenon and Appleton International Airport, in the town of Greenville. The privately owned Shiocton Airport is also located nearby.

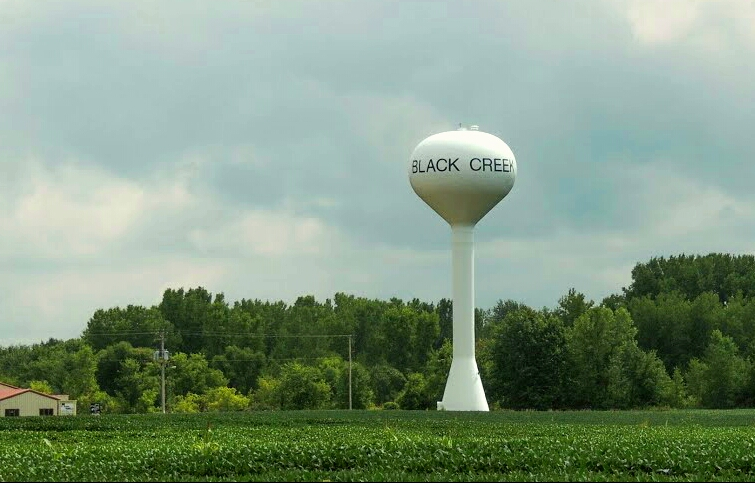
Black Creek water tower

=== Utilities ===
Water services are provided by the village. Electricity and natural gas lines for the community are maintained by WE Energies. Biweekly recycling pickup is performed by Outagamie County Solid Waste Department while the village provides weekly garbage collection.

=== Health care ===
ThedaCare Physicians serves Black Creek as the local clinic. Other health resources in the village include a chiropractor, a dentist, and an optometrist. Nearby hospitals include ThedaCare Medical Center-New London, ThedaCare Regional Medical Center-Appleton, and St. Elizabeth Hospital in Appleton.

== Notable people ==
- Jon Dietzen, former American football guard for the Pittsburgh Maulers
- John Miller Baer, U.S. Congressman for North Dakota
- Charles J. Hagen, Wisconsin State Assemblyman and businessman
- Kenneth E. Priebe, Wisconsin State Assemblyman
- W. C. Zumach, Wisconsin State Senator and American Socialist

== Gallery ==
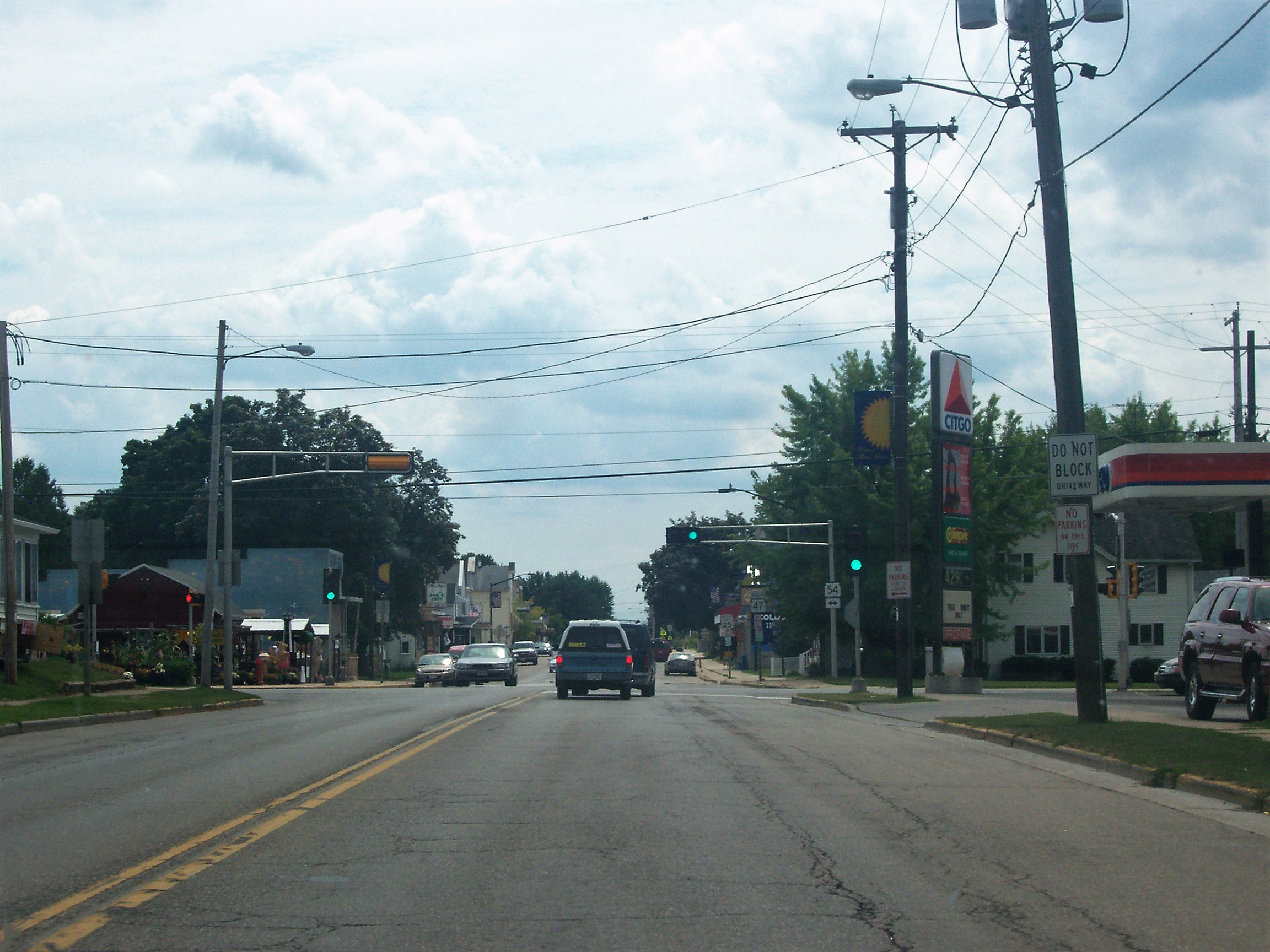
The WIS 47/WIS 54 "crossroads"

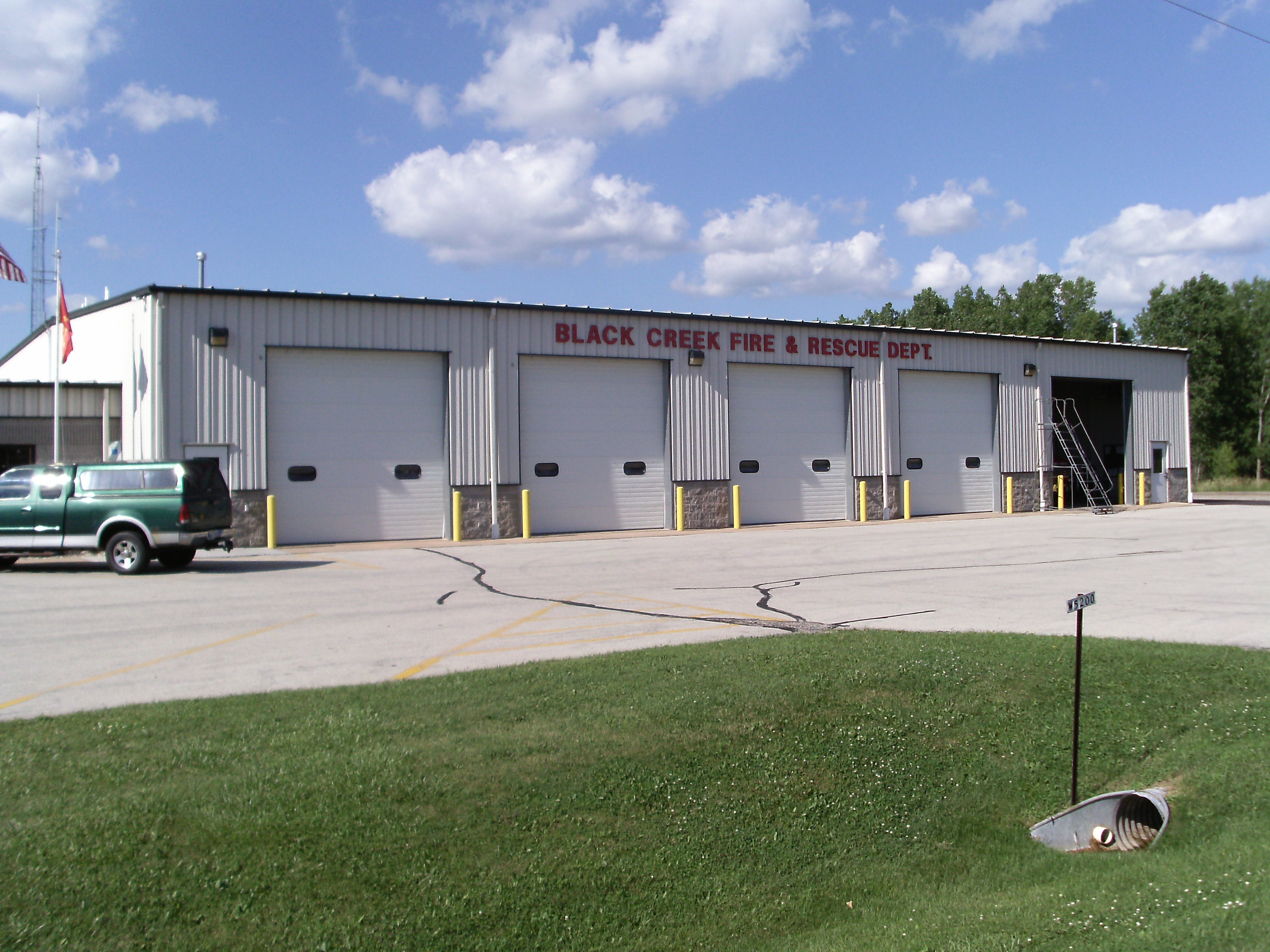
Black Creek Fire & Rescue Department

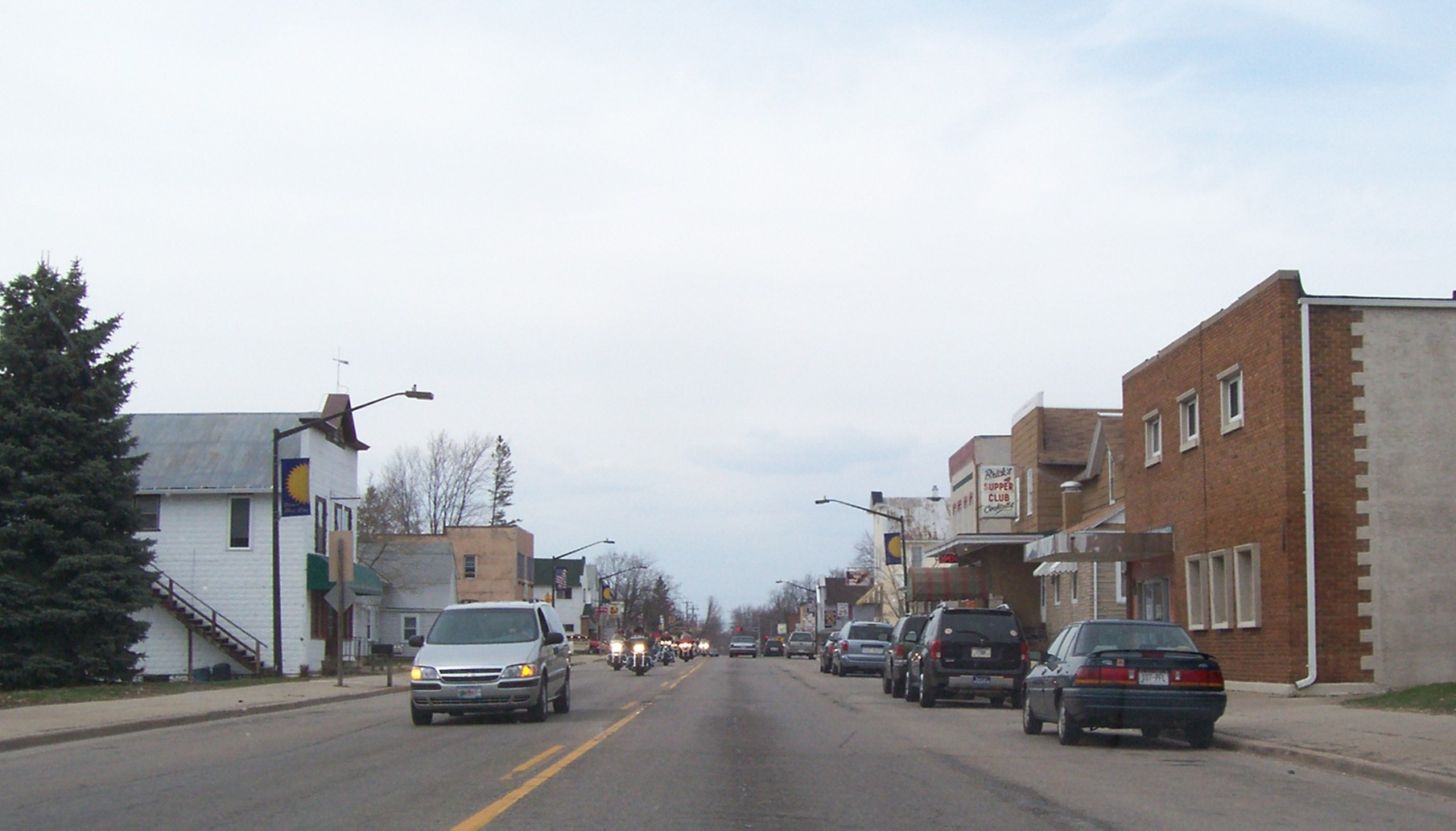
Looking north at downtown Black Creek

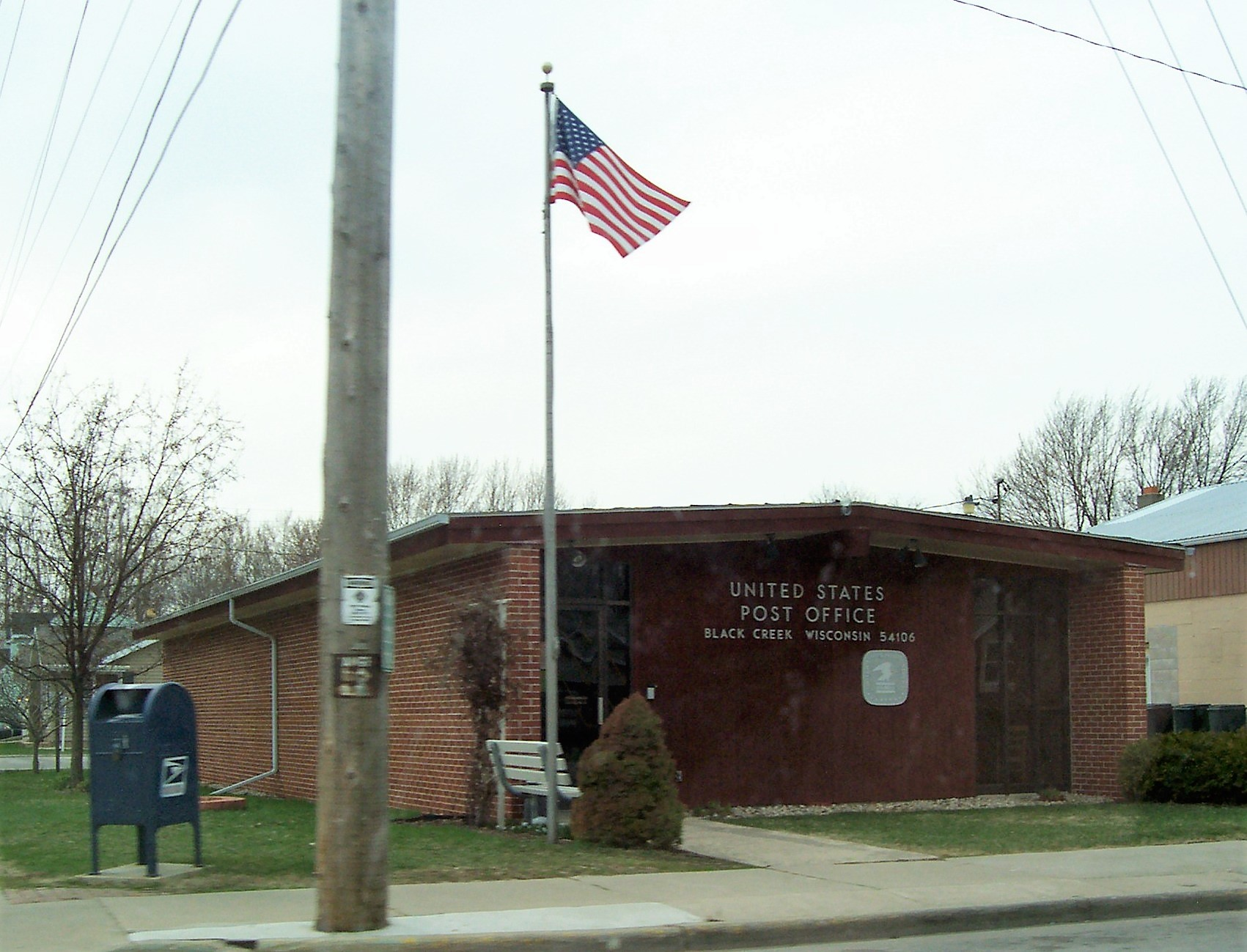
United States Post Office

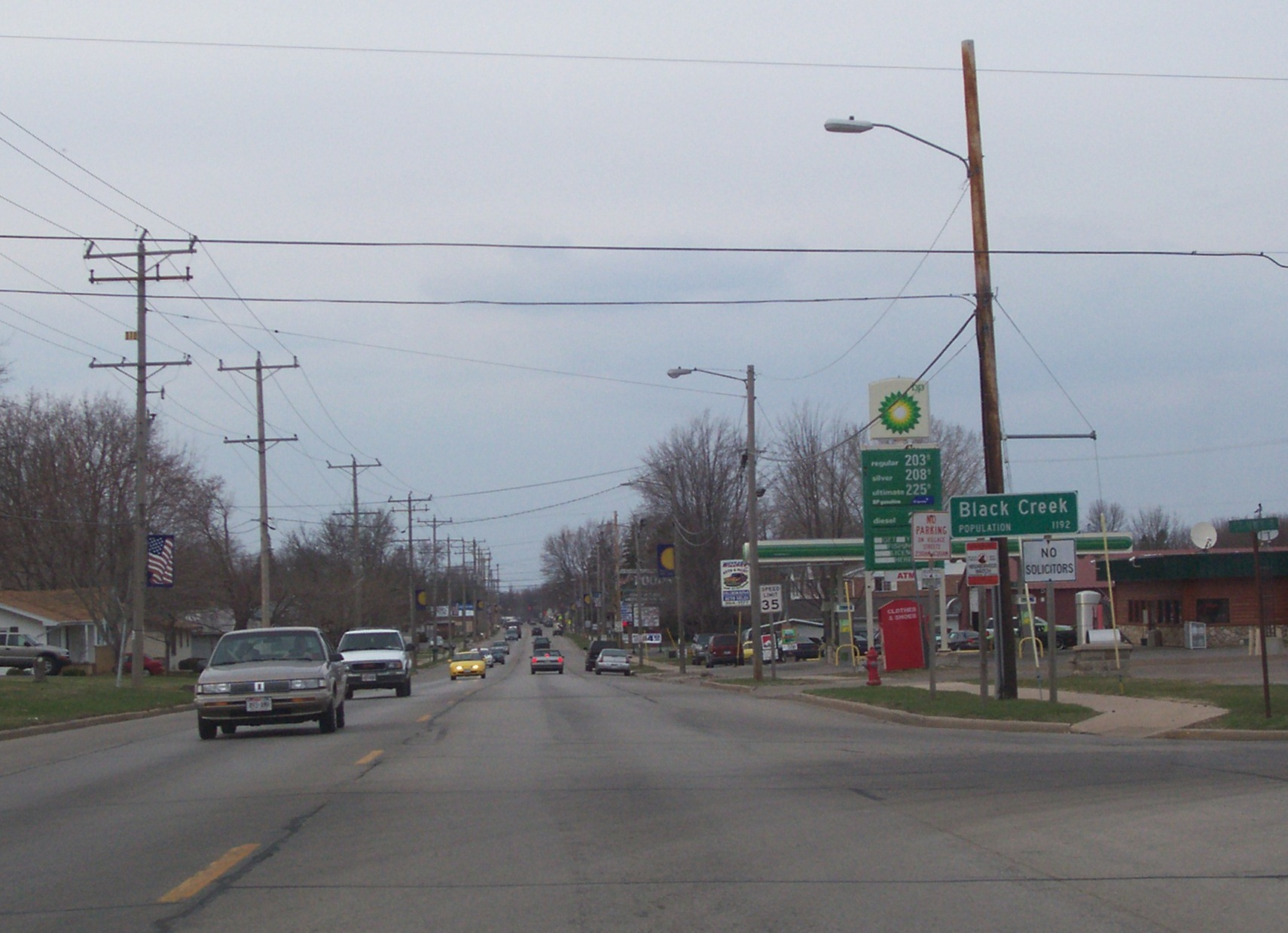
Looking north at WIS DOT sign on WIS 47

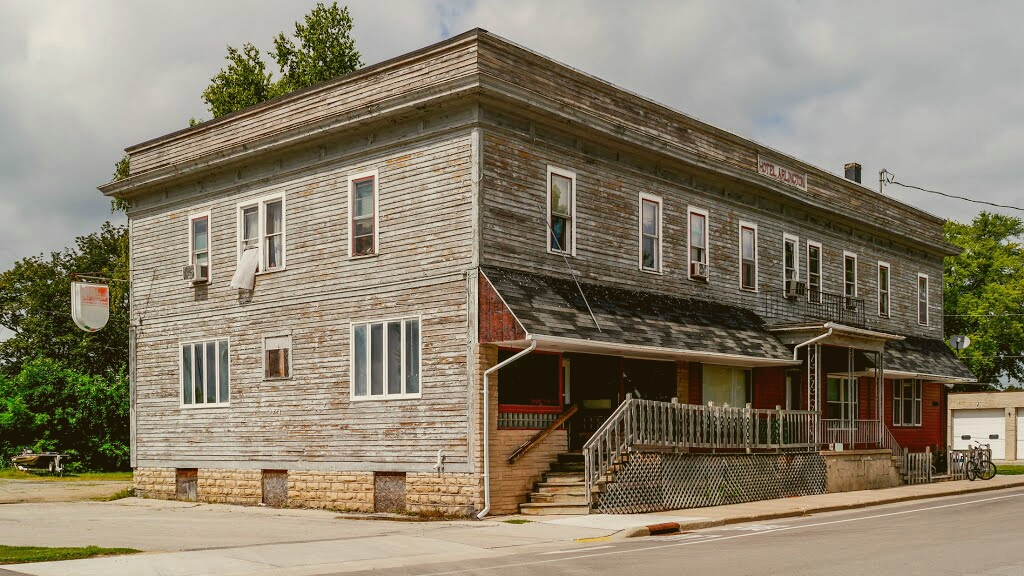
Historic Hotel Arlington

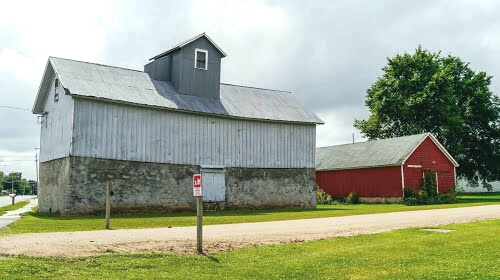
Former Cargill Elevator along Maple Street

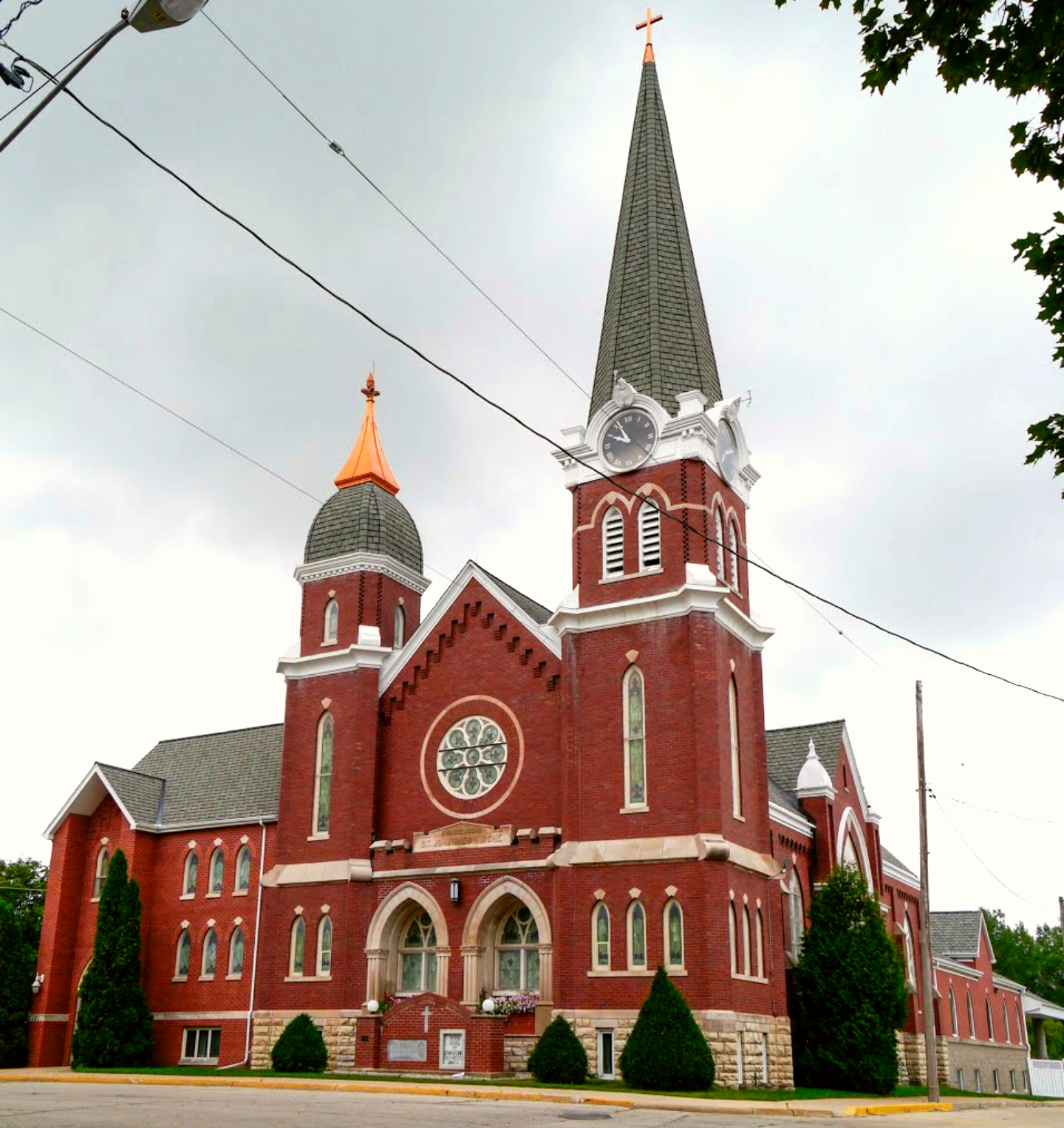
St. Johns United Church of Christ

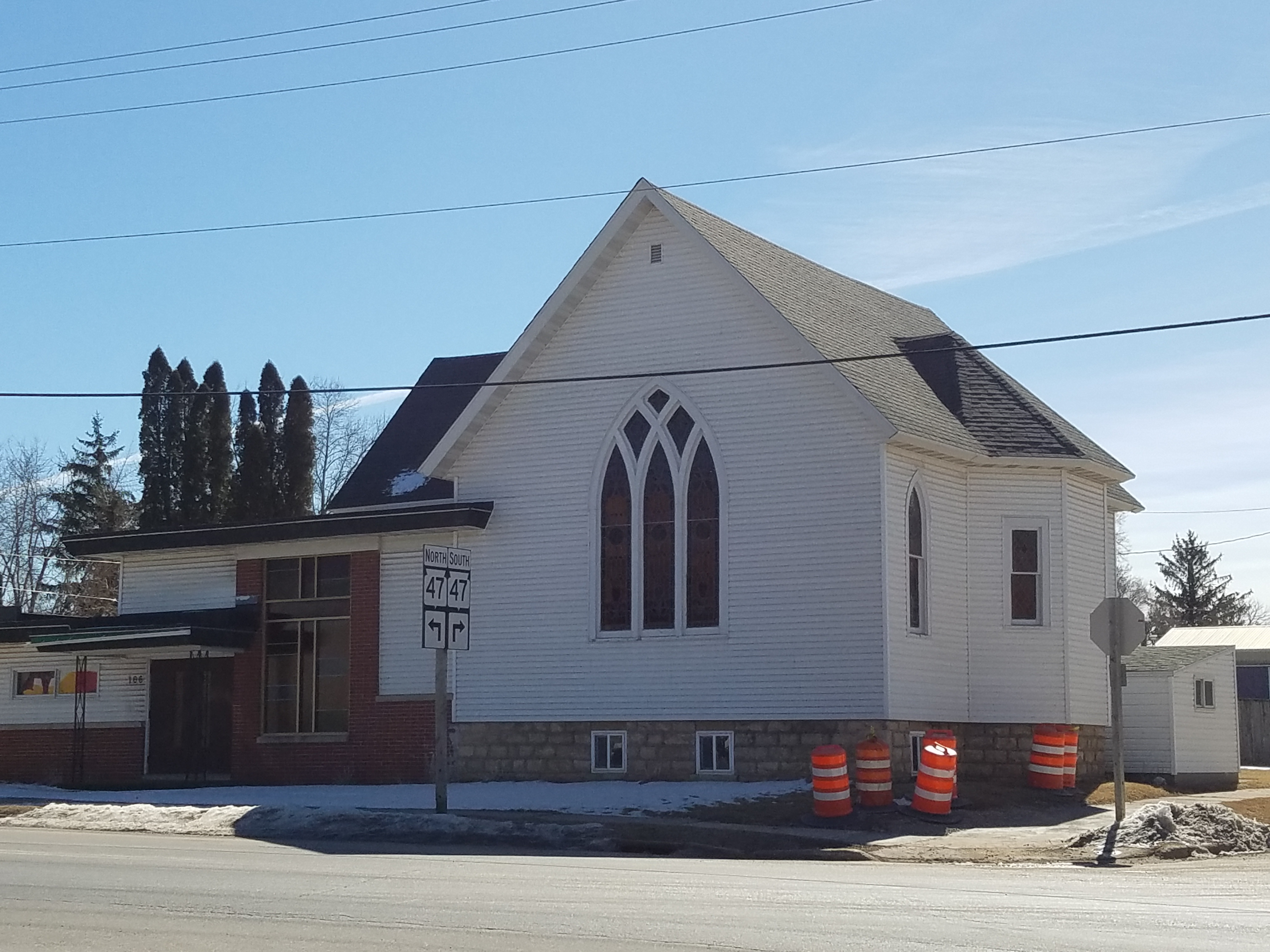
Former Black Creek United Methodist Church

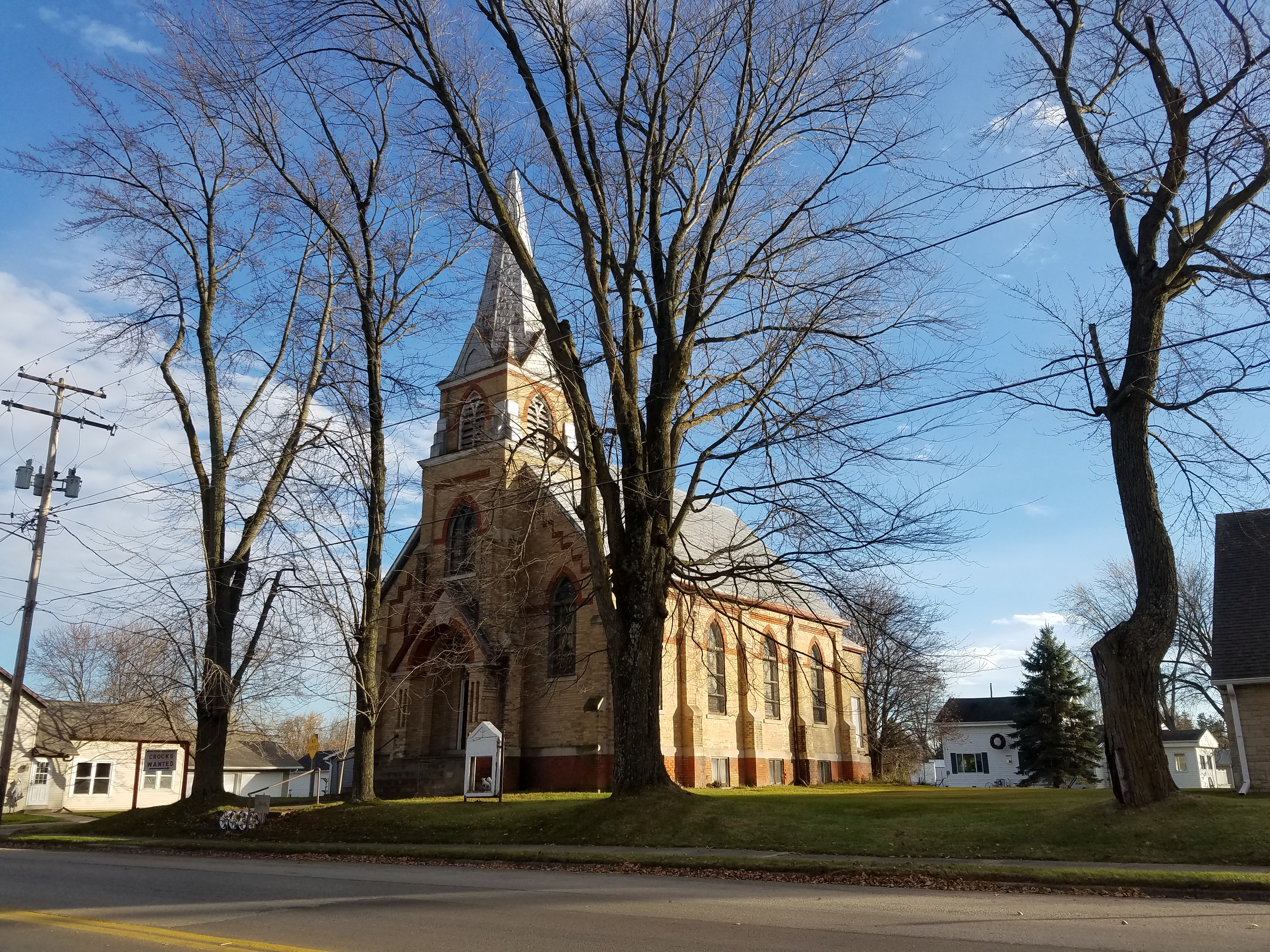
Former Immanuel Lutheran Church

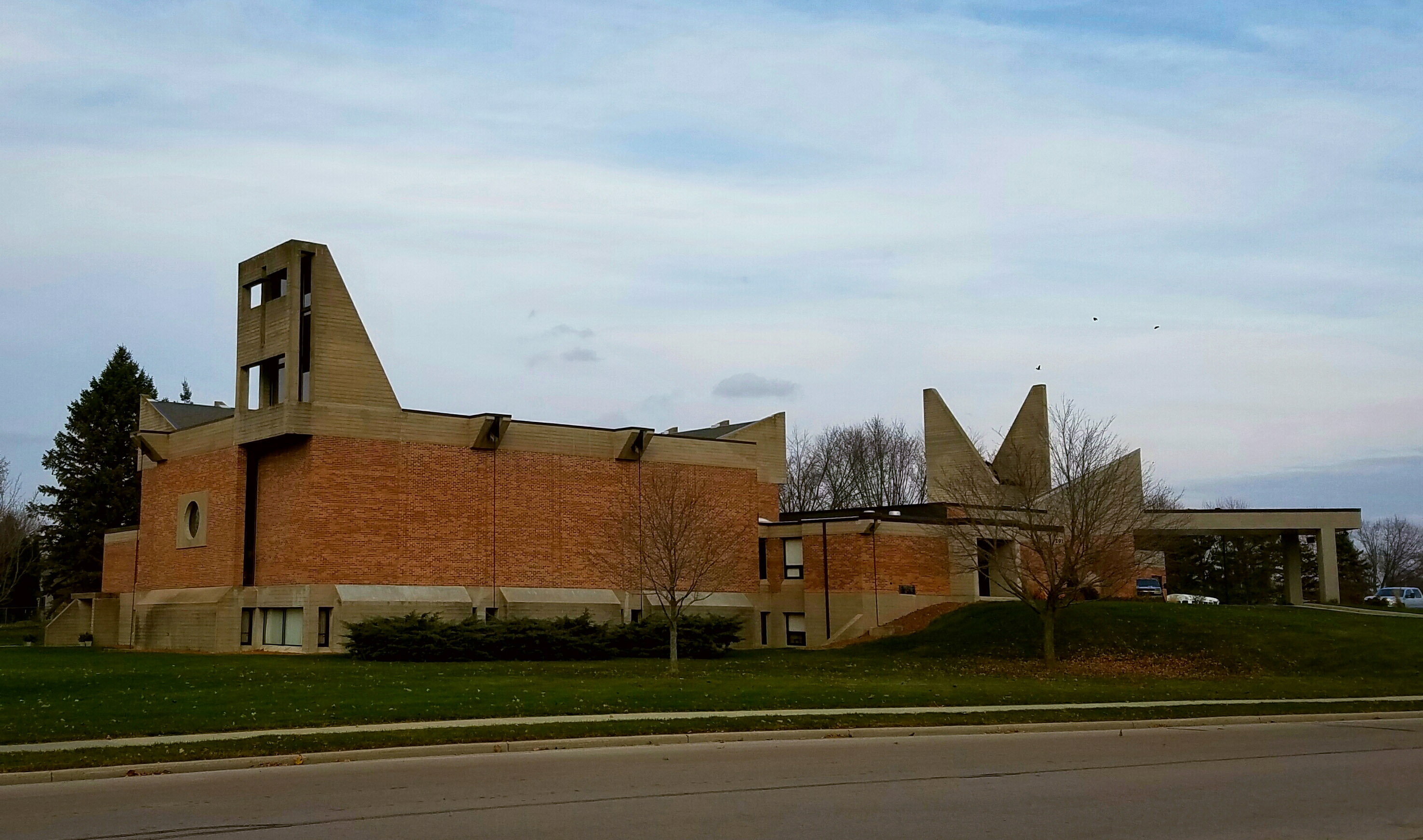
Current Immanuel Lutheran worship home

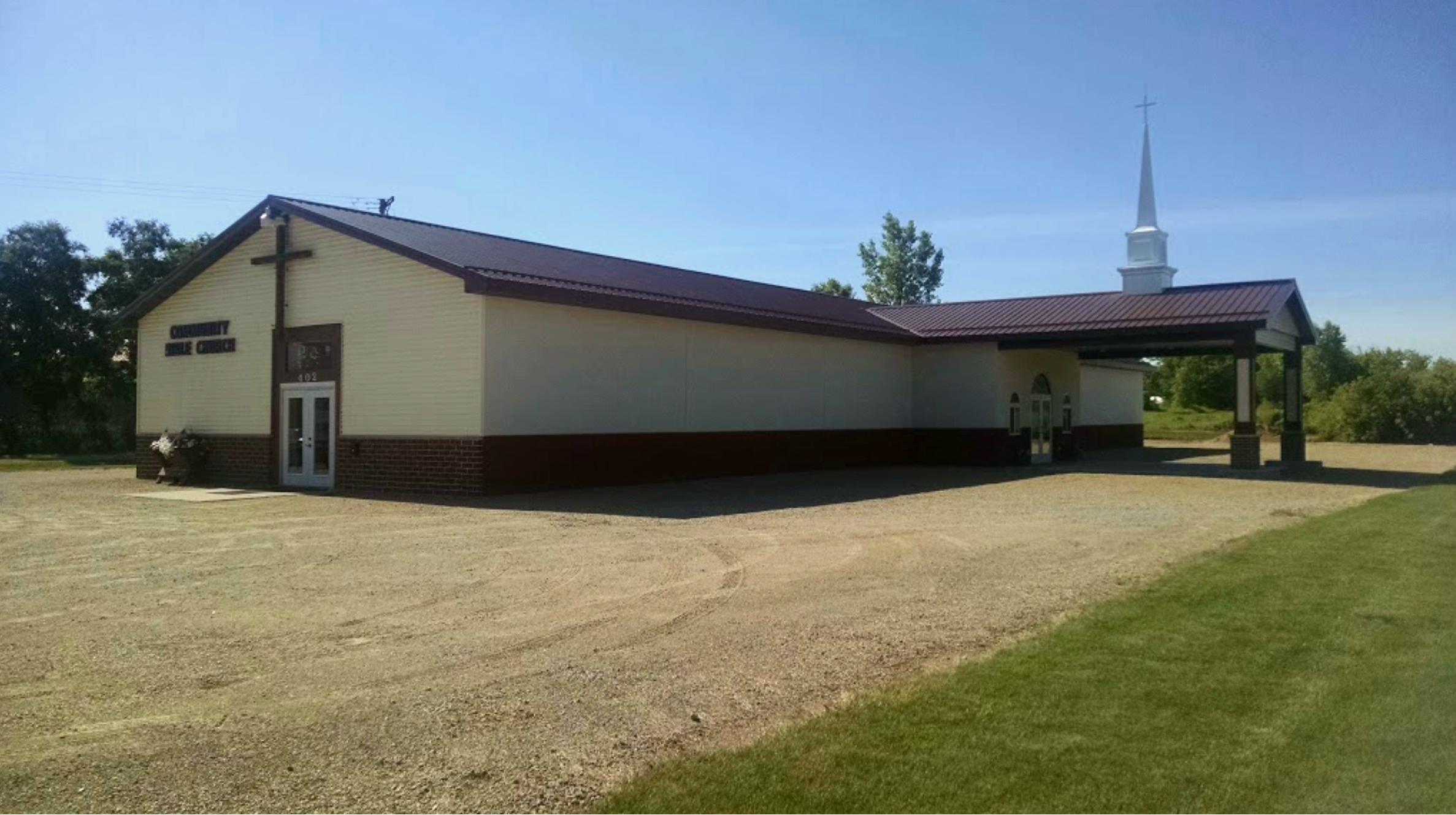
Community Bible Church on the village's west side
