= Binghamton, Wisconsin =

- Unincorporated community
- Location within Wisconsin
- Coordinates: 44°27′30″N 88°27′21″W
- Country: United States
- State: Wisconsin
- County: Outagamie
- Elevation: 830 ft (252.9 m)
- Time zone: UTC-6 (Central (CST))
  - Summer (DST): UTC-5 (CDT)
- ZIP Codes: 54106

Binghamton is an unincorporated community in the Town of Black Creek in Outagamie County, Wisconsin, United States.

== Geography ==
Binghamton is located at 44°25′37″N 88°28′26″W(44.426944, -88.473889). Its elevation is 830 feet (252.9m).

== Transportation ==
Highway A's Western Terminus is WIS 76; County A then travels East and turns South after the WIS 47 intersection then ending at its Southern terminis WIS 125.

== Local events ==
- Polkafest (Held at Romy's Nitingale)
