= George Peters House =

Historic house in Wisconsin, United States

- U.S. National Register of Historic Places
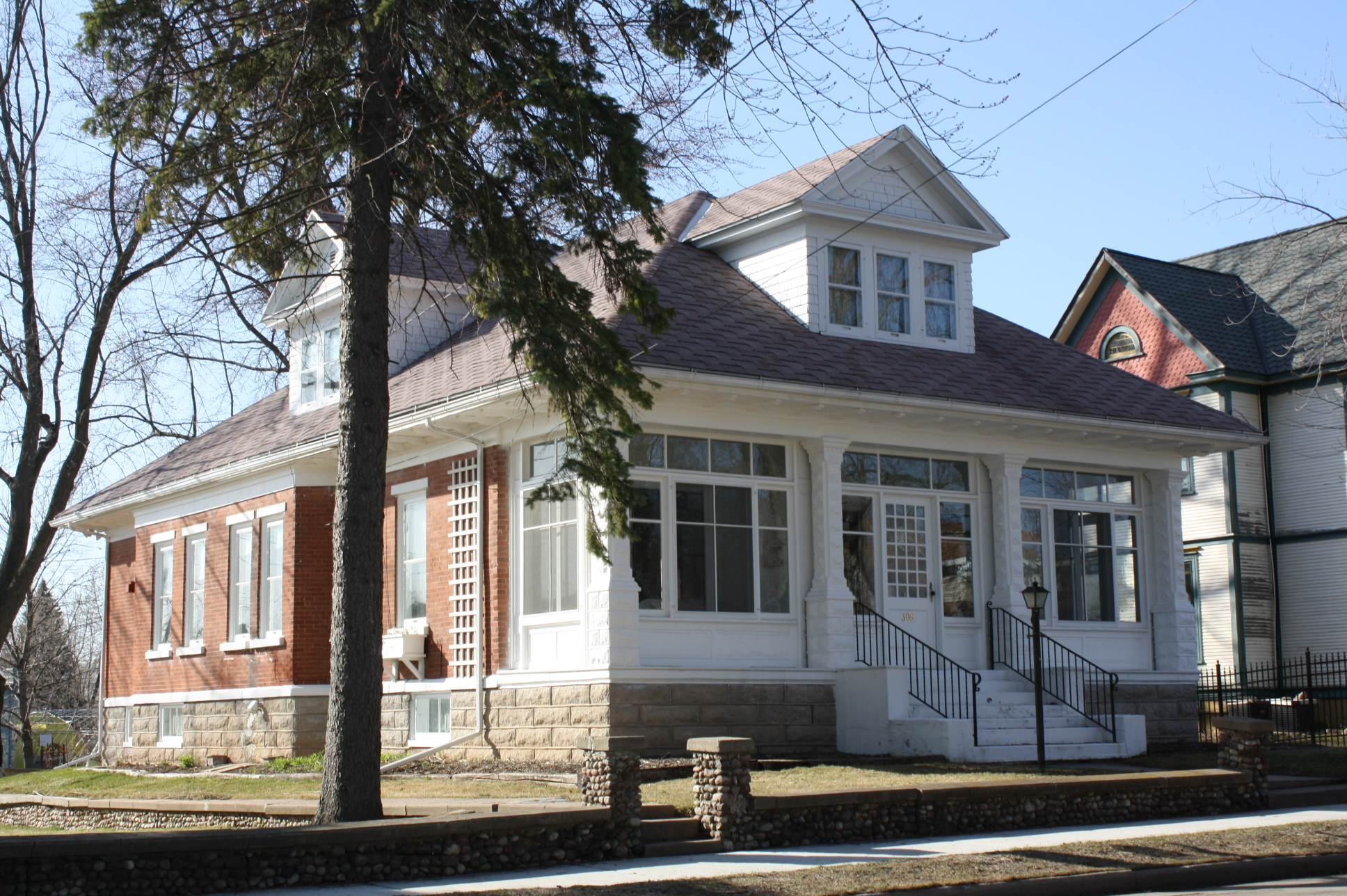

- Location within Wisconsin Location within the United States
- Location: 305 N. Maple Street, Black Creek, Outagamie County, Wisconsin, USA
- Coordinates: 44°28′37″N 88°26′59″W
- Area: less than one acre
- Built: 1909
- Architect: J.N. Kundert
- Architectural style: Bungalow/Craftsman
- NRHP reference No.: 87000989
- Added to NRHP: June 18, 1987

The George Peters House is a historic house in Black Creek, Wisconsin, United States. The house was built in 1909 and was added to the National Register of Historic Places on June 18, 1987.

== Location ==
The house is located at 305 N. Maple Street in Black Creek, Wisconsin, 44°28′37″N 88°26′59″W, near the intersection of North Maple Street and West State Street (WIS 54). It is in an area of Black Creek where houses range from 100 years old to 140 years old.

== Restoration ==
This residence was restored between 2008 and 2010.
