= Black Creek (town), Wisconsin =

Black Creek, Wisconsin
- Town
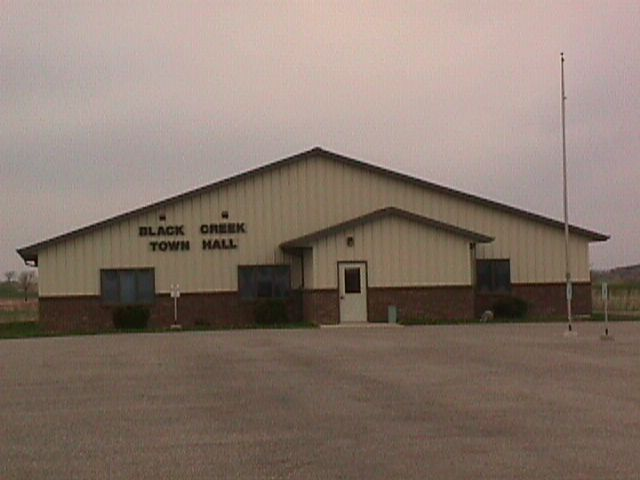
- Black Creek Town Hall

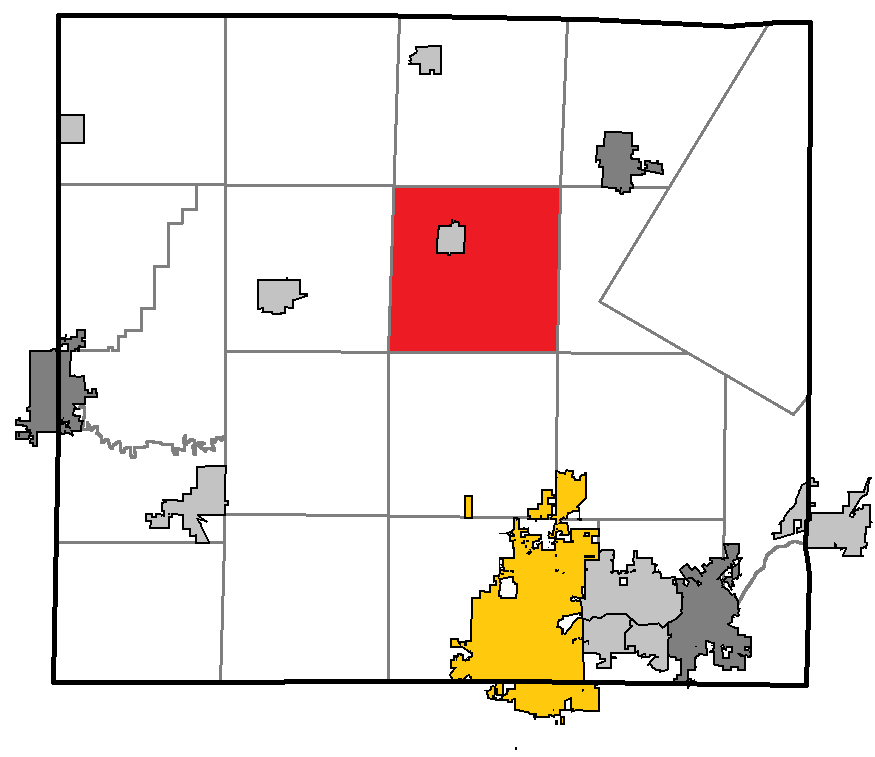
- Location of Black Creek, within Outagamie County
- Coordinates: 44°27′30″N 88°27′21″W
- Country: United States
- State: Wisconsin
- County: Outagamie
- Established: March 1862

Government
  - Type: Town Board – Chairperson & two Supervisors
  - Chairperson: Dan Knutson
  - Town Clerk: Karen Herman

Area
  - Total: 35 sq mi (90 km^{2})
  - Land: 35 sq mi (90 km^{2})
  - Water: 0 sq mi (0.0 km^{2})
- Elevation: 835 ft (254.5 m)

Population (2020)
  - Total: 1,251
  - Density: 36/sq mi (14/km^{2})
- Time zone: UTC-6 (Central (CST))
  - Summer (DST): UTC-5 (CDT)
- ZIP Codes: 54106 & 54165
- Area code: 920
- FIPS code: 55-07750
- GNIS feature ID: 1582819
- Website: www.BlackCreekWI.org

Black Creek is a town in Outagamie County, Wisconsin, United States. The population was 1,251 at the 2020 census. The Village of Black Creek (governed separately) and the unincorporated community of Binghamton are located in the town. The unincorporated community of Five Corners is also located partially in the town. The town was formerly served by the Black Creek Police Department, before it ended service in July of 2025.It is served currently by the Black Creek Fire Rescue.

== History ==
In November 1861, petitioners requested a new town, Black Creek, be established and separated from the existing town of Center. The Outagamie county board approved and made this final in March 1862; officers were elected in April.

== Geography ==
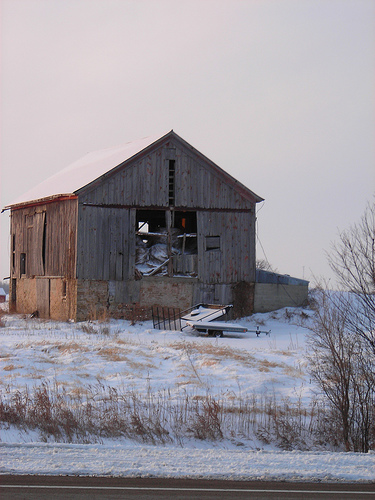
A farm east of Black Creek

The town of Black Creek is located at 44°27′32″N 88°26′23″W(44.458889, −88.439722). According to the United States Census Bureau, the town has a total area of 34.8 square miles (90 km^{2}), all land.

== Demographics ==
Historical population
Census	Pop.	Note	%±
2000	1,268		—
2010	1,259		−0.7%
2020	1,251		−0.6%
U.S. decennial census

As of the census of 2010, there were 1,259 people, 487 households, and 469 families residing in the town. The population density was 36.9 people per square mile (14.0/km^{2}). There were 487 housing units at an average density of 14.10 per square mile (5.4/km^{2}). The racial makeup of the town was 97.00% White, ???% Native American, 0.66% Asian, 0.2% African American, 0.6% from other races, and 2.04% from two or more races. 0.39% of the population were Hispanic or Latino of any race.

There were 469 occupied households, out of which 11.59% had children under the age of 18 living with them.

In the town, the population was spread out, with 23.98% under the age of 18, 76% were over the age of 18, 4.28% from 20 to 24, 8.74% from 25 to 34, 24.78% from 35 to 49, 22.56% from 50 to 64, and 12.71% who were 65 years of age or older. For every 100 females, there were 108.8 males.

The median income for a household in the town was $53,472, and the median income for a family was $59,196. Males had a median income of $37,188 versus $25,096 for females. The per capita income for the town was $20,481. About 5.9% of families and 6.1% of the population were below the poverty line, including 7.3% of those under age 18 and 4.5% of those age 65 or over.

== Education ==
Students in the Town of Black Creek are served by the school in the Village of Black Creek, Black Creek Elementary & Middle School, which is part of the Seymour Community School District. Part of the town is also served by the Shiocton School District.

Historical population
Census	Pop.	Note	%±
1870	528		—
1880	1,285		143.4%
1890	1,377		7.2%
1900	1,482		7.6%
1910	1,006		−32.1%
1920	950		−5.6%
1930	843		−11.3%
1940	854		1.3%
1950	880		3.0%
1960	884		0.5%
1970	968		9.5%
1990	1,169		—
2000	1,268		8.5%
2010	1,259		−0.7%
(1980 Census Data unavailable)

== Transportation ==
WIS 47 northbound, routes to Shawano. Southbound, WIS 47 routes to Appleton.
WIS 54 westward routes to Shiocton and New London. Eastward WIS 54 routes to Seymour and Green Bay.
Going westbound County Hwy A routes to WIS 76. Going eastbound Hwy A routes to WIS 47 and turns southbound to Appleton, WI.
Hwy B's western terminus is WIS 47 and its eastern terminus is Hwy PP.
Going eastbound Hwy P routes to WIS 47. Going westbound Hwy P routes to WIS 187.
Hwy PP's northern terminus is WIS 54 and its southern terminus is WIS 47.
The Canadian National Railway, formerly known as the Soo Line Railroad, going northbound routes to Shawano. Going southbound it routes to Appleton.

== Recreation ==
- Fallen Timbers Environmental Center
- Newton Blackmour State Trail
- The Meadows Trails
- Town Hall Park
