= Wisconsin's 6th congressional district =

U.S. House district for Wisconsin

Coordinates: 43°46′45″N 88°16′28″W

- Interactive map of district boundaries since January 3, 2023
- Representative: Glenn Grothman; R–Glenbeulah
- Area: 7,886.71 mi^{2} (20,426.5 km^{2})
- Distribution: 62.96% urban; 37.04% rural
- Population (2025): 742,999
- Median household income: $77,778
- Ethnicity: 85.07% White; 7.82% Two or more races; 6.59% Hispanic; 2.56% Asian; 2.40% Black; 1.64% other; 0.50% Native American; 0.002% Pacific Islander Americans
- Cook PVI: R+8
- Created: 1863

Wisconsin's 6th congressional district is a congressional district of the United States House of Representatives in eastern Wisconsin. It is based in the rural, suburban and exurban communities between Madison, Milwaukee, and Green Bay. It also includes the village of River Hills in far northern Milwaukee County. The district is currently represented by Glenn Grothman (R-Glenbeaulah) who took office in January 2015.

The 6th district has a long history of farming livestock in rural areas, and is a major producer of both milk and grains.

The 6th district has been a Republican stronghold for most of its history; since the 1930s, only one Democrat, John A. Race, represented the district between 1965 and 1967. The 6th district's Republican lean extends to presidential races; since 1952, only three Democrats have carried it: Lyndon B. Johnson in 1964, Bill Clinton in 1996, and Barack Obama in 2008, all three of whom swept the state of Wisconsin in landslides. In the 2020 Presidential Election, the district voted 57% for Donald Trump and 42% for Joe Biden. In 2024, it backed Donald Trump by a slightly bigger margin, 57%-41%, over Kamala Harris.

== Counties and municipalities within the district ==
For the 118th and successive Congresses (based on redistricting following the 2020 census), the district contains all or portions of the following counties, towns, and municipalities:

Calumet County (4)

Brothertown, Kiel (shared with Manitowoc County), New Holstein (city), New Holstein (town)

Columbia County (35)

All 35 towns and municipalities

Dodge County (17)

Beaver Dam, Brownsville, Burnett, Chester, Fox Lake (city), Fox Lake (town), Kekoskee, LeRoy, Lomira (town), Lomira (village), Mayville, Randolph (shared with Columbia County), Theresa (town) (part; also 5th), Theresa (village), Trenton, Waupun (shared with Fond du Lac County), Westford

Fond du Lac County (34)

All 34 towns and municipalities

Green Lake County (16)

All 16 towns and municipalities

Manitowoc County (30)

All 30 towns and municipalities

Marquette County (19)

All 19 towns and municipalities

Ozaukee County (16)

All 16 towns and municipalities

Sheboygan County (25)

All 25 towns and municipalities

Waushara County (26)

All 19 towns and municipalities

Winnebago County (22)

Algoma, Appleton (part; also 8th; shared with Calumet and Outagamie counties), Black Wolf, Clayton (part; also 8th), Fox Crossing, Menasha (part; also 8th; shared with Calumet County), Neenah (city), Neenah (town), Nekimi, Nepeuskun, Omro (city), Omro (town), Oshkosh (city), Oshkosh (town), Poygan, Rushford, Utica, Vinland, Winchester (part; also 8th), Winneconne (town), Winneconne (village), Wolf River

== History ==
Wisconsin's 6th congressional district came into existence in 1863 following the federal census of 1860. The first elected representative from the district was Walter D. McIndoe of Wausau. The district originally comprised the counties of the northern and western parts of the state. Following subsequent congressional reapportionment after each decennial census, the district's boundaries shifted eastward.

=== Census of 1860 ===
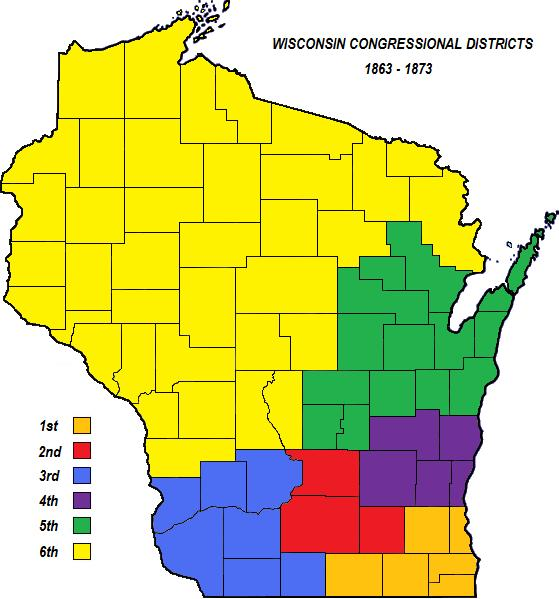
Wisconsin Congressional districts following the 1860 census

The reapportionment of Congressional districts following the federal census of 1860 gave Wisconsin three additional members in the House of Representatives. Members elected from the newly created 4th, 5th and 6th districts were chosen in the midterm elections of 1862 and took their seats in the lower house as part of the 38th United States Congress.

The 6th District originally included the counties of Adams, Ashland, Bad Ax (Vernon), Buffalo, Burnett, Dallas (Barron), Chippewa, Clark, Douglas, Dunn, Eau Claire, Jackson, Juneau, La Crosse, La Pointe, Marathon, Monroe, Pepin, Pierce, Polk, Portage, St. Croix, Trempealeau, and Wood.

Areas of east central Wisconsin, which make up much of the 6th district today, were originally part of the newly created 5th district.

=== Census of 1870 ===
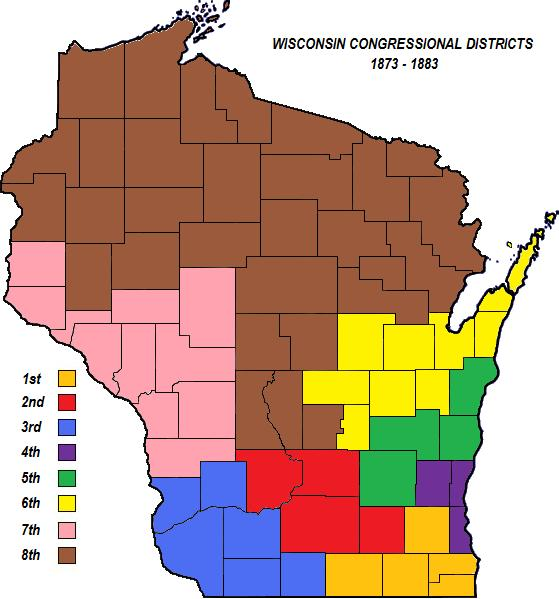
Wisconsin Congressional districts following the 1870 census

Following the 1870 census Wisconsin gained two seats in the House of Representatives. The new 6th District was shifted eastward and included many counties in northeast Wisconsin. It included the counties of Brown, Calumet, Door, Green Lake, Kewaunee, Outagamie, Waupaca, Waushara and Winnebago. Representative Philetus Sawyer of Oshkosh had been elected to Congress from Wisconsin's 5th District since 1865, was then elected from the newly configured 6th District. He later served the state as a member of the U.S. Senate.

=== Census of 1880 ===
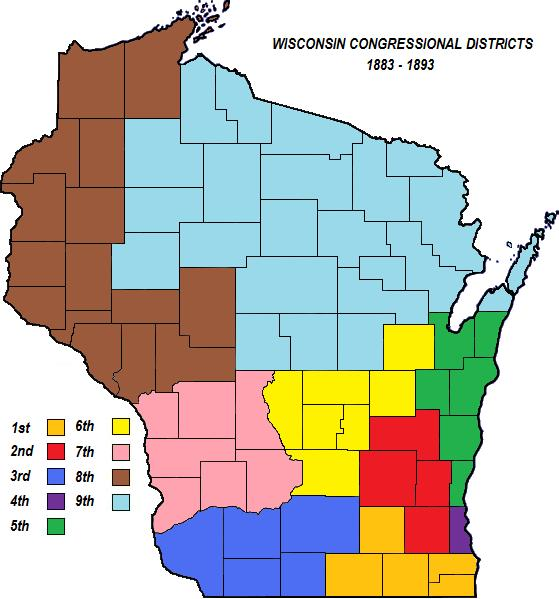
Wisconsin Congressional districts following the 1880 census

The federal census of 1880 showed further population growth in Wisconsin and the state gained a 9th Congressional seat. Reapportionment of the state moved the 6th District to a more central location within the state, though the representatives elected from the district came from the communities along the shores of Lake Winnebago throughout the decade. The 6th District now included the counties of Adams, Green Lake, Marquette, Outagamie, Waushara and Winnebago.

=== Census of 1890 ===
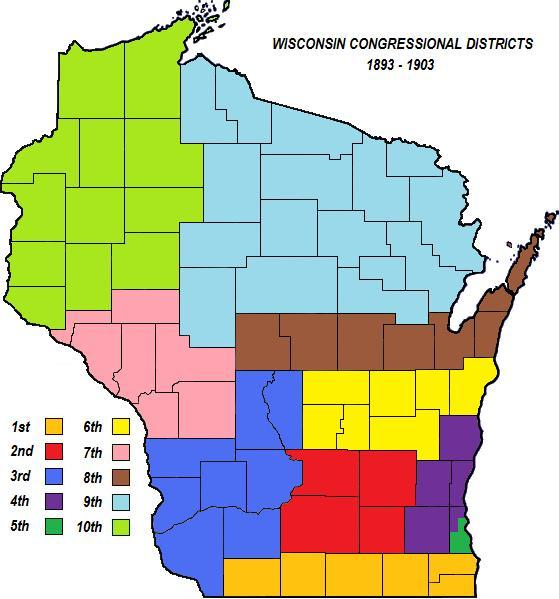
Wisconsin Congressional districts following the 1890 census

Following the census of 1890 Wisconsin gained a 10th Congressional seat. The 6th District shifted eastward to a configuration that closely resembled that of today's linear east to west shape with a population of 187,001. The state population was enumerated at 1,686,880. The 6th District then included the counties of Calumet, Fond du Lac, Green Lake, Marquette, Marquette, Waushara and Winnebago.

=== Census of 1900 ===
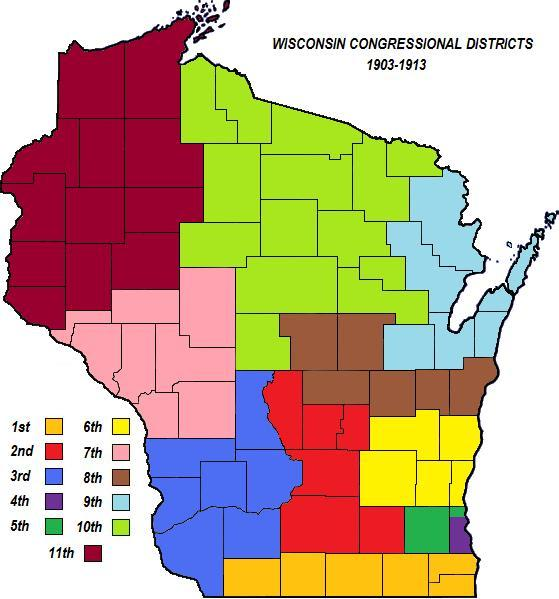
Wisconsin Congressional districts following the 1900 census

The state's population reached 2,069,042 according to the 1900 federal census and Wisconsin gained an additional seat in the House of Representatives. This was the peak of Wisconsin's Congressional representation and the state maintained 11 members of the House of Representatives until the opening of the 73rd United States Congress in 1933. The 6th District shifted southward and included the counties of Dodge, Fond du Lac, Ozaukee, Sheboygan and Washington. The counties in the vicinity of Lake Winnebago became part of the 8th District. The population of the counties making up the 6th District totaled 184,517.

=== Censuses of 1910 & 1920 ===
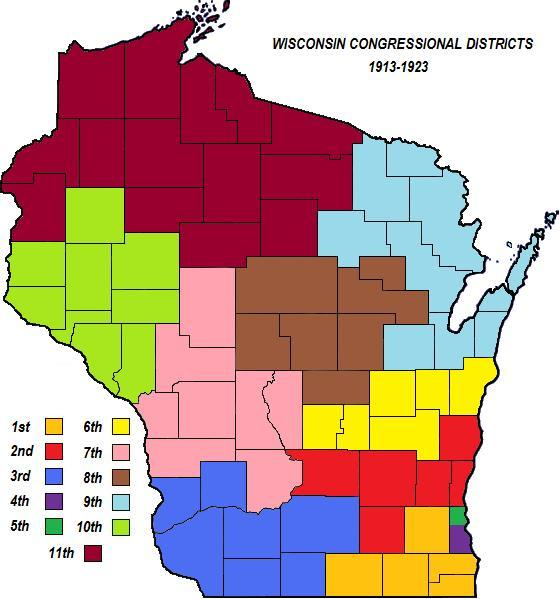
Wisconsin Congressional districts following the 1910 and 1920 censuses

The 1910 census tabulated a population of 2,333,860 citizens for Wisconsin and the 1920 census saw the state's population grow to 2,632,670. As a result of this growth, the state retained its 11 seats in the House of Representatives throughout the 1910s and 1920s. Prior to congressional elections in 1912, the 6th District was reconfigured in manner closer to that of the 1893 apportionment. The district included the counties of Calument, Fond du Lac, Green Lake, Manitowoc, Marquette, and Winnebago. All 11 districts continued in the same configurations until the elections of 1932. The 6th district grew from 201,637 to 214,206 between the two enumerations.

=== Censuses of 1930, 1940 & 1950 ===
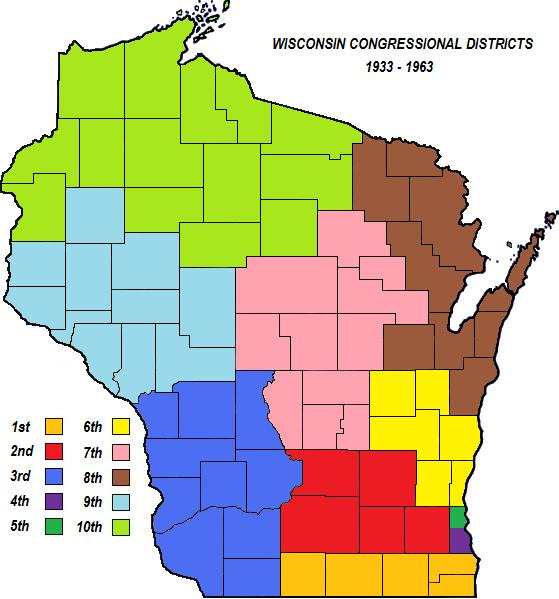
Wisconsin Congressional districts following the 1930, 1940 and 1950 censuses

Wisconsin lost a congressional seat following the census of 1930. The 6th District now included Calumet, Fond du Lac, Ozaukee, Sheboygan, Washington, and Winnebago counties. According to the 1950 census, the population of the district was 315,666. This southeastern shift of the district remained in effect for 30 years, ending with the 1962 elections.

=== Census of 1960 ===
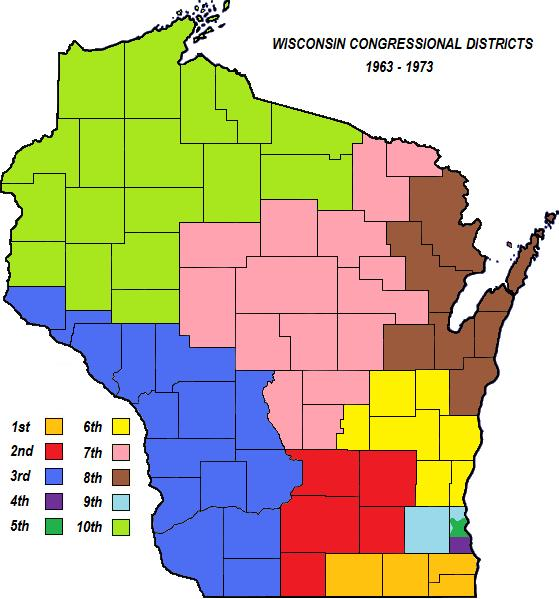
Wisconsin Congressional districts following the 1960 census

The state held on to all 10 of its Congressional seats following the 1960 census. As a result of changing population patterns, the districts were reapportioned. Green Lake County was added to the existing counties of the 6th District, which were Calumet, Fond du Lac, Ozaukee, Sheboygan, Washington and Winnebago. This slight western shift gave the district a population of 391,743.

It was also during this era, that the Republican Party's domination of the district was broken. Democrat John Abner Race, represented the district from 1965 to 1967. Other than this brief interruption, a Republican has been sent to Washington, D.C. in every election since 1938.

=== Census of 1970 ===
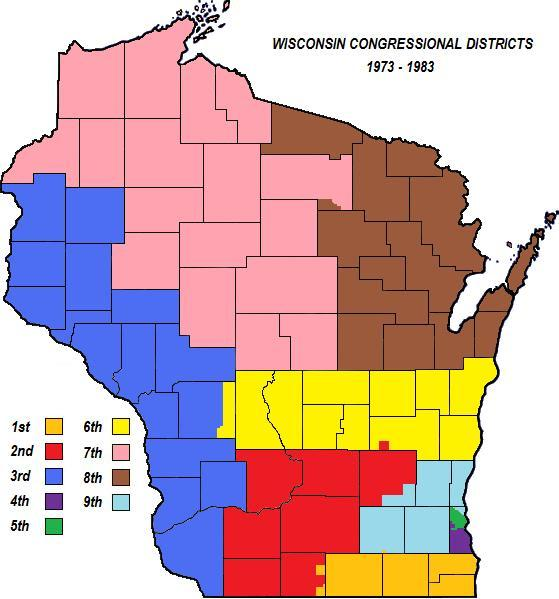
Wisconsin Congressional districts following the 1970 census

The state of Wisconsin gained 465,318 residents for a total of 4,418,683 according to the 1970 census. Because this was a lower increase than other areas of the country, the state lost a seat in the House of Representatives, requiring the state's districts to be reapportioned.

The 6th District now extended farther west than at any time other since its original configuration in 1860. It now included all or portions of Adams, Calumet, Fond du Lac, Green Lake, Juneau, Manitowoc, Marquette, Monroe, Sheboygan, Waushara, and Winnebago counties.

This was the first time, other than in Milwaukee County, that districts did not follow county borders throughout the state. The Town of Waupun in Fond du Lac County was included in the 2nd District. Only the five easternmost towns in Monroe County were included in the 6th District.

=== Census of 1980 ===
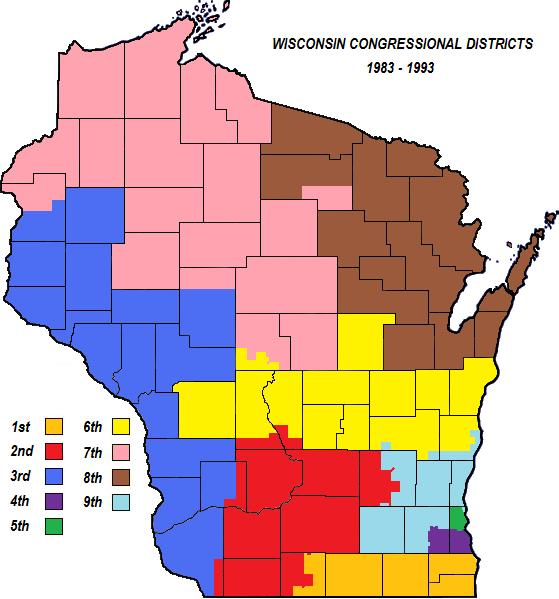
Wisconsin Congressional districts following the 1980 census

Following the 1980 census the 6th District again expanded in size. All of Monroe County now became part of the district, which was a further westward expansion. All of Waupaca County and the southwest corner of Wood County expanded the district to the north. Southern towns in Adams, Juneau, Fond du Lac and Sheboygan counties, as well as the city of Sheboygan, were removed from the district and included in the 2nd District and 9th District. In addition, the counties of Calumet, Green Lake, Manitowoc, Marquette, Waushara and Winnebago were included in their entirety. The population of the 6th District according to the 1980 census was 522,546.

=== Census of 1990 ===
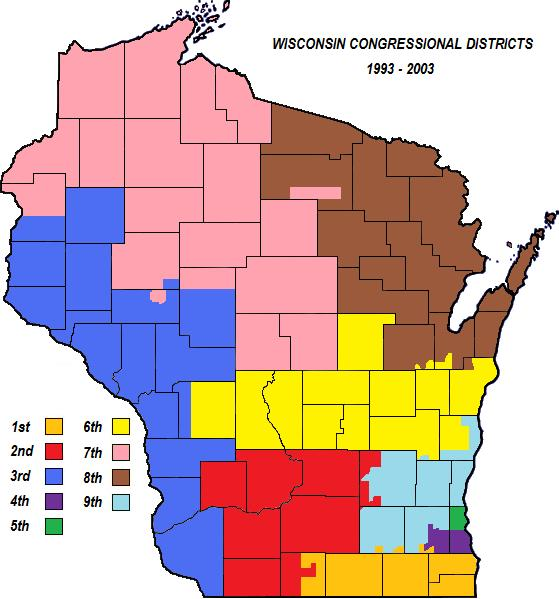
Wisconsin Congressional districts following the 1990 census

The 1990 census saw Wisconsin retain its nine seats in the House of Representatives and created only minor changes to the 6th District. All or portions of Adams, Brown, Calumet, Fond du Lac, Green Lake, Juneau, Manitowoc, Marquette, Monroe, Outagamie, Sheboygan, Waupaca, Waushara, and Winnebago counties were part of the Sixth.

=== Census of 2000 ===
Following the 2000 census, Wisconsin's population rose to 5,363,675. Because this growth was not as large as in other parts of the nation, Wisconsin lost a congressional seat. Now with only eight seats, a major redistricting took place in the state for the first time since the state's loss of its 10th seat following the census of 1970. The new 6th District included the counties of Adams, Calumet, Dodge, Fond du Lac, Green Lake, Marquette, Manitowoc, Waushara and Winnebago, in addition to small sections of Outagamie and Jefferson counties.

=== Census of 2010 ===
Wisconsin held on to its eight seats in the House of Representatives following the census of 2010, although the district boundaries were changed by the state legislature to include Columbia and Ozaukee County, while no longer including Adams, Calumet, and most of Dodge County. This isn't the first time the 6th congressional district included Ozaukee County. However this is the first time it include a portion of Milwaukee County. It included the northern suburb River Hills.

== List of members representing the district ==
Member	Party	Years	Cong ress	Electoral history
District established March 4, 1863
Walter D. McIndoe (Wausau)	Republican	March 4, 1863 – March 3, 1867	38th 39th	Redistricted from the 2nd district and re-elected in 1862. Re-elected in 1864. Retired.
Cadwallader C. Washburn (La Crosse)	Republican	March 4, 1867 – March 3, 1871	40th 41st	Elected in 1866. Re-elected in 1868. Retired.
Jeremiah McLain Rusk (Viroqua)	Republican	March 4, 1871 – March 3, 1873	42nd	Elected in 1870. Redistricted to the 7th district.
Philetus Sawyer (Oshkosh)	Republican	March 4, 1873 – March 3, 1875	43rd	Redistricted from the 5th district and re-elected in 1872. Retired.
Alanson M. Kimball (Pine River)	Republican	March 4, 1875 – March 3, 1877	44th	Elected in 1874. Lost re-election.
Gabriel Bouck (Oshkosh)	Democratic	March 4, 1877 – March 3, 1881	45th 46th	Elected in 1876. Re-elected in 1878. Lost re-election.
Richard W. Guenther (Oshkosh)	Republican	March 4, 1881 – March 3, 1887	47th 48th 49th	Elected in 1880. Re-elected in 1882. Re-elected in 1884. Redistricted to the 2nd district.
Charles B. Clark (Neenah)	Republican	March 4, 1887 – March 3, 1891	50th 51st	Elected in 1886. Re-elected in 1888. Lost re-election.
Lucas M. Miller (Oshkosh)	Democratic	March 4, 1891 – March 3, 1893	52nd	Elected in 1890. Lost renomination.
Owen A. Wells (Fond du Lac)	Democratic	March 4, 1893 – March 3, 1895	53rd	Elected in 1892. Lost re-election.
Samuel A. Cook (Neenah)	Republican	March 4, 1895 – March 3, 1897	54th	Elected in 1894. Retired to run for U.S. senator.
James H. Davidson (Oshkosh)	Republican	March 4, 1897 – March 3, 1903	55th 56th 57th	Elected in 1896. Re-elected in 1898. Re-elected in 1900. Redistricted to the 8th district.
Charles H. Weisse (Sheboygan Falls)	Democratic	March 4, 1903 – March 3, 1911	58th 59th 60th 61st	Elected in 1902. Re-elected in 1904. Re-elected in 1906. Re-elected in 1908. Retired.
Michael E. Burke (Beaver Dam)	Democratic	March 4, 1911 – March 3, 1913	62nd	Elected in 1910. Redistricted to the 2nd district.
Michael Reilly (Fond du Lac)	Democratic	March 4, 1913 – March 3, 1917	63rd 64th	Elected in 1912. Re-elected in 1914. Lost re-election.
James H. Davidson (Oshkosh)	Republican	March 4, 1917 – August 6, 1918	65th	Elected in 1916. Died.
Vacant		August 6, 1918 – November 5, 1918	65th	
Florian Lampert (Oshkosh)	Republican	November 5, 1918 – July 18, 1930	65th 66th 67th 68th 69th 70th 71st	Elected to finish Davidson's term. Also elected to the next full term. Re-elected in 1920. Re-elected in 1922. Re-elected in 1924. Re-elected in 1926. Re-elected in 1928. Died.
Vacant		July 18, 1930 – November 4, 1930	71st	
Michael Reilly (Fond du Lac)	Democratic	November 4, 1930 – January 3, 1939	71st 72nd 73rd 74th 75th	Elected to finish Lampert's term. Also elected to the next full term. Re-elected in 1932. Re-elected in 1934. Re-elected in 1936. Lost re-election.
Frank Bateman Keefe (Oshkosh)	Republican	January 3, 1939 – January 3, 1951	76th 77th 78th 79th 80th 81st	Elected in 1938. Re-elected in 1940. Re-elected in 1942. Re-elected in 1944. Re-elected in 1946. Re-elected in 1948. Retired.
William Van Pelt (Fond du Lac)	Republican	January 3, 1951 – January 3, 1965	82nd 83rd 84th 85th 86th 87th 88th	Elected in 1950. Re-elected in 1952. Re-elected in 1954. Re-elected in 1956. Re-elected in 1958. Re-elected in 1960. Re-elected in 1962. Lost re-election.
John Abner Race (Fond du Lac)	Democratic	January 3, 1965 – January 3, 1967	89th	Elected in 1964. Lost re-election.
William A. Steiger (Oshkosh)	Republican	January 3, 1967 – December 4, 1978	90th 91st 92nd 93rd 94th 95th	Elected in 1966. Re-elected in 1968. Re-elected in 1970. Re-elected in 1972. Re-elected in 1974. Re-elected in 1976. Re-elected in 1978 but died before next term began.
Vacant		December 4, 1978 – April 3, 1979	95th 96th	
Tom Petri (Fond du Lac)	Republican	April 3, 1979 – January 3, 2015	96th 97th 98th 99th 100th 101st 102nd 103rd 104th 105th 106th 107th 108th 109th 110th 111th 112th 113th	Elected to finish Steiger's term. Re-elected in 1980. Re-elected in 1982. Re-elected in 1984. Re-elected in 1986. Re-elected in 1988. Re-elected in 1990. Re-elected in 1992. Re-elected in 1994. Re-elected in 1996. Re-elected in 1998. Re-elected in 2000. Re-elected in 2002. Re-elected in 2004. Re-elected in 2006. Re-elected in 2008. Re-elected in 2010. Re-elected in 2012. Retired.
Glenn Grothman (Glenbeulah)	Republican	January 3, 2015 – present	114th 115th 116th 117th 118th 119th	Elected in 2014. Re-elected in 2016. Re-elected in 2018. Re-elected in 2020. Re-elected in 2022. Re-elected in 2024. Re-elected in 2026.

== Recent election results ==
=== 2002 district boundaries (2002–2011) ===
Year	Date	Elected				Defeated				Total	Plurality
2002	Nov. 5	Tom Petri (inc)	Republican	169,834	99.22%	--unopposed--				171,161	168,507
2004	Nov. 2	Tom Petri (inc)	Republican	238,620	67.03%	Jef Hall	Dem.	107,209	30.12%	355,995	131,411
2004	Nov. 2	Tom Petri (inc)	Republican	238,620	67.03%	Carol Ann Rittenhouse	Grn.	10,018	2.81%	355,995	131,411
2006	Nov. 7	Tom Petri (inc)	Republican	201,367	98.92%	--unopposed--				203,557	199,177
2008	Nov. 4	Tom Petri (inc)	Republican	221,875	63.71%	Roger A. Kittelson	Dem.	126,090	36.21%	348,264	95,785
2010	Nov. 2	Tom Petri (inc)	Republican	183,271	70.66%	Joseph C. Kallas	Dem.	90,634	27.36%	259,367	107,345

=== 2011 district boundaries (2012–2021) ===
Year	Date	Elected				Defeated				Total	Plurality
2012	Nov. 6	Tom Petri (inc)	Republican	223,460	62.12%	Dave Heaster	Dem.	135,921	37.78%	359,745	87,539
2014	Nov. 4	Glenn Grothman	Republican	169,767	56.77%	Chris Rockwood	Dem.	122,212	40.87%	299,033	47,555
2014	Nov. 4	Glenn Grothman	Republican	169,767	56.77%	Gus Fahrendorf	Ind.	6,865	2.30%	299,033	47,555
2016	Nov. 8	Glenn Grothman (inc)	Republican	204,147	57.15%	Sarah Lloyd	Dem.	133,072	37.26%	357,183	71,075
2016	Nov. 8	Glenn Grothman (inc)	Republican	204,147	57.15%	Jeff Dahlke	Lib.	19,716	5.52%	357,183	71,075
2018	Nov. 6	Glenn Grothman (inc)	Republican	180,311	55.47%	Dan Kohl	Dem.	144,536	44.46%	325,065	35,775
2020	Nov. 3	Glenn Grothman (inc)	Republican	238,874	59.23%	Jessica King	Dem.	164,239	40.72%	403,333	74,635

=== 2022 district boundaries (2022–2031) ===
Year	Date	Elected				Defeated				Total	Plurality
2022	Nov. 8	Glenn Grothman (inc)	Republican	239,231	94.93%	Tom Powell (write-in)	Ind.	340	0.13%	251,999	238,891
2024	Nov. 5	Glenn Grothman (inc)	Republican	251,889	61.2%	John Zarbano	Dem.	159,042	38.7	411,349	

== Recent election results from statewide races ==
Year	Office	Results
2008	President	Obama 49.21% - 49.16%
2010	Senate	Johnson 61% - 38%
2010	Governor	Walker 61% - 38%
2010	Secretary of State	King 56% - 44%
2010	Attorney General	Van Hollen 67% - 33%
2010	Treasurer	Schuller 61% - 39%
2012	President	Romney 54% - 46%
2012	Senate	Thompson 53% - 44%
2012	Governor (Recall)	Walker 62% - 38%
2014	Governor	Walker 61% - 38%
2014	Secretary of State	Bradley 54% - 42%
2014	Attorney General	Schimel 59% - 38%
2014	Treasurer	Adamczyk 56% - 37%
2016	President	Trump 55% - 38%
2016	Senate	Johnson 59% - 38%
2018	Senate	Vukmir 53% - 47%
2018	Governor	Walker 57% - 41%
2018	Secretary of State	Schroeder 55% - 44%
2018	Attorney General	Schimel 57% - 41%
2018	Treasurer	Hartwig 55% - 42%
2020	President	Trump 57% - 41%
2022	Senate	Johnson 59% - 41%
2022	Governor	Michels 57% - 42%
2022	Secretary of State	Loudenbeck 56% - 40%
2022	Attorney General	Toney 58% - 42%
2022	Treasurer	Leiber 58% - 39%
2024	President	Trump 57% - 41%
2024	Senate	Hovde 56% - 41%

== Historical district boundaries ==
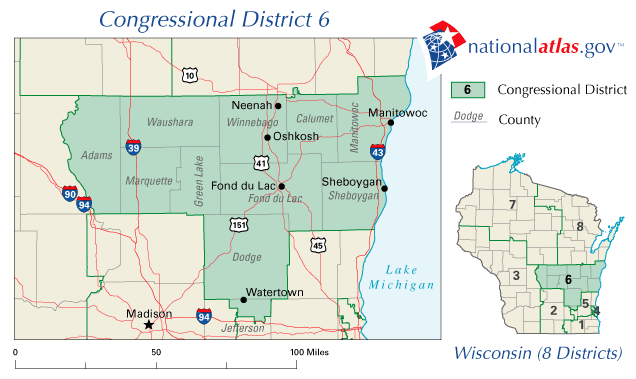
2003–2013

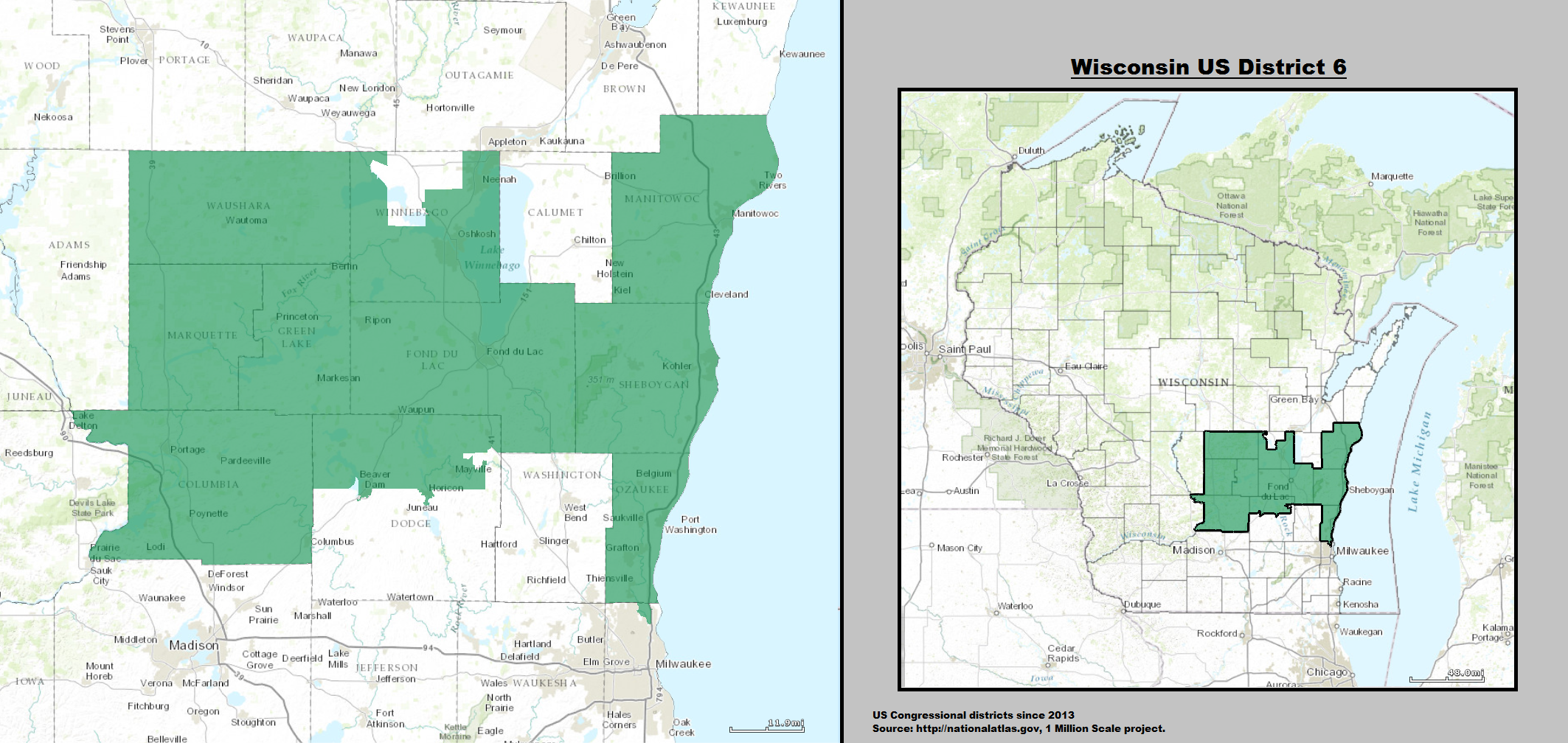
2013–2023

== See also ==
- Wisconsin's congressional districts
- List of United States congressional districts
