= Charles Neitzel =

American politician

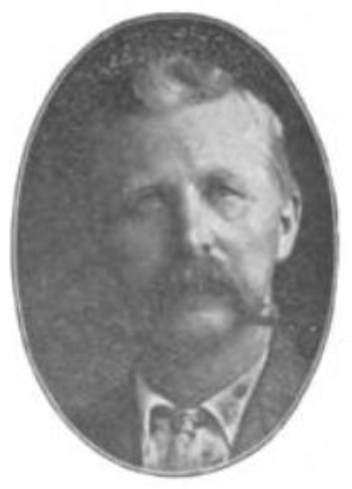

Member of the Wisconsin State Assembly
- In office 1906–1910
- Constituency: Winnebago County Third District

Personal details
- Born: April 1, 1853 Black Wolf, Wisconsin
- Died: December 22, 1938 (aged 85) Oshkosh, Wisconsin
- Party: Republican
- Occupation: Farmer, politician

Charles Neitzel (April 1, 1853 – December 22, 1938) was an American farmer and politician.

Born in the town of Black Wolf, Wisconsin, Neitzel was a farmer. He was also involved with the People's Brewery Company, the Nekimi Fire Insurance Company, and the Triangle Manufacturing Company. He served as town treasurer and chairman. Neitzel also served on the school board. Neitzel served in the Wisconsin State Assembly, in 1907 and 1909, and was a Republican.

He died at his home in Oshkosh on December 22, 1938.
