= Wolf River, Wisconsin =

Wolf River, Wisconsin can refer to:

Places

- Wolf River, Langlade County, Wisconsin
- Wolf River, Winnebago County, Wisconsin

Rivers

- Wolf River (Fox River), a tributary of the Fox River emptying into Lake Butte des Morts
- Wolf River (Eau Claire River), a tributary of the North Fork Eau Claire River.
