= Winneconne =

Winneconne may refer to:

- Winneconne, Wisconsin, a village
- Winneconne (town), Wisconsin, a town
