= Metz, Wisconsin =

- Unincorporated community
- Location within Wisconsin Location within the United States
- Coordinates: 44°12′49″N 88°53′11″W
- Country: United States
- State: Wisconsin
- Counties: Waushara and Winnebago
- Elevation: 778 ft (237 m)
- Time zone: UTC-6 (Central (CST))
  - Summer (DST): UTC-5 (CDT)
- Area codes: 715 & 534
- GNIS feature ID: 1577727

Metz is an unincorporated community in Waushara and Winnebago counties, Wisconsin, United States. Metz is located 6.5 miles south of Fremont, in the towns of Bloomfield and Wolf River.
