= Butte des Morts, Wisconsin =

Census-designated place in Wisconsin, United States

- Census-designated place
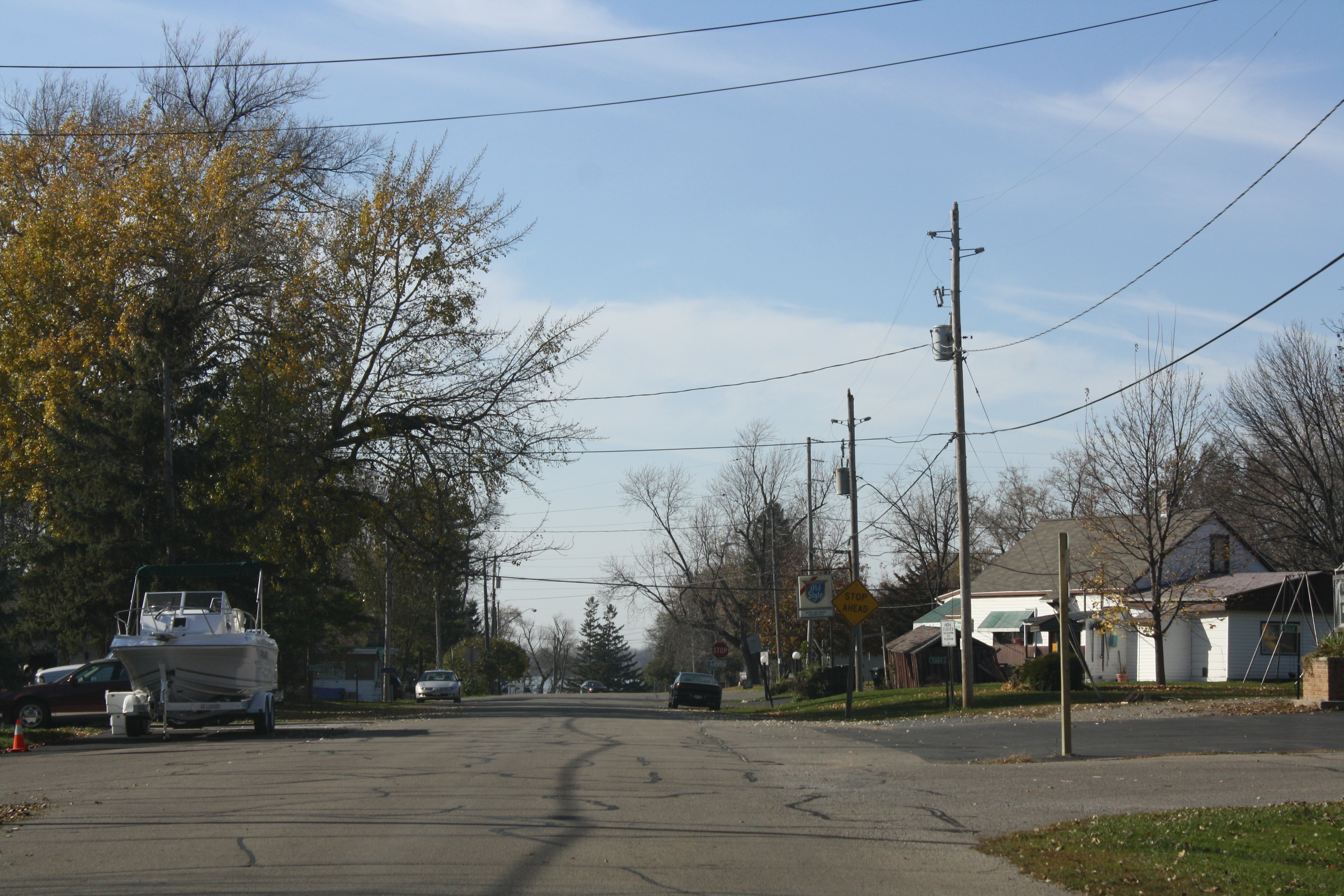
- Downtown Butte des Morts

- Location in state of Wisconsin
- Coordinates: 44°5′57″N 88°39′14″W
- Country: United States
- State: Wisconsin
- County: Winnebago

Area
  - Total: 1.24 sq mi (3.22 km^{2})
  - Land: 1.22 sq mi (3.17 km^{2})
  - Water: 0.019 sq mi (0.05 km^{2})
- Elevation: 775 ft (236 m)

Population (2020)
  - Total: 1,005
  - Density: 821/sq mi (317/km^{2})
- Time zone: UTC-6 (Central (CST))
  - Summer (DST): UTC-5 (CDT)
- ZIP code: 54927
- Area code: 920
- FIPS code: 55-11500
- GNIS feature ID: 1562472

Butte des Morts is an unincorporated census-designated place in the town of Winneconne and Oshkosh, in Winnebago County, Wisconsin, United States.

As of the 2020 census, Butte des Morts had a population of 1,005. The community is located at the north side of (Big) Lake Butte des Morts on the former route of Wisconsin Highway 110. The name means "hill of the dead" in French. Butte des Morts uses the ZIP code 54927. The Augustin Grignon Hotel, listed on the National Register of Historic Places, is located within the community. Butte des Morts has an area of 1.246 square miles (3.23 km^{2}); 1.225 square miles (3.17 km^{2}) of this is land, and 0.021 square miles (0.054 km^{2}) is water.

Origin of Name

In 1730 French soldiers and Menominee warriors massacred people of the Sauk Nation. The French named the place the Hill of the Dead, or Butte des Morts.

== Images ==
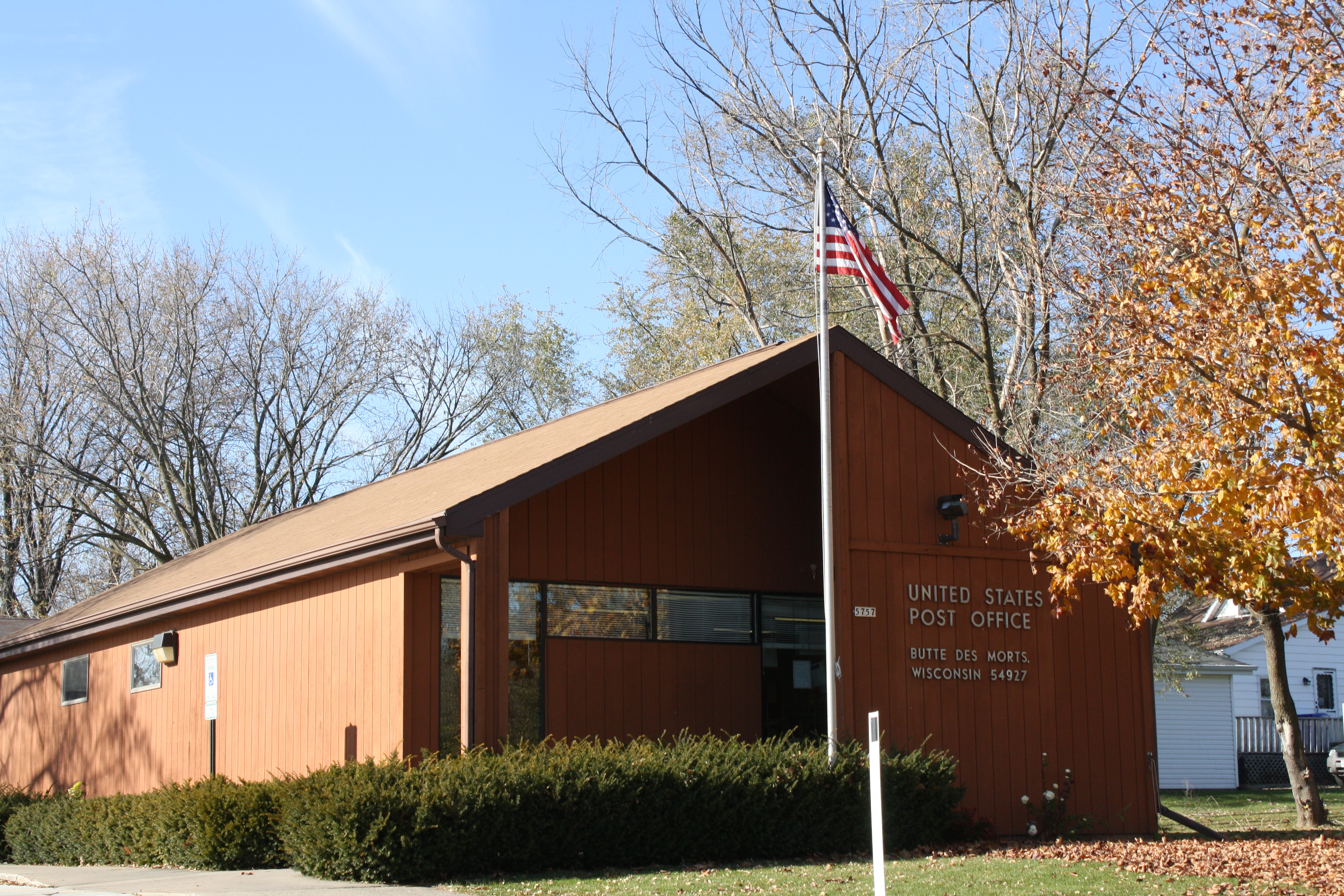
Post office

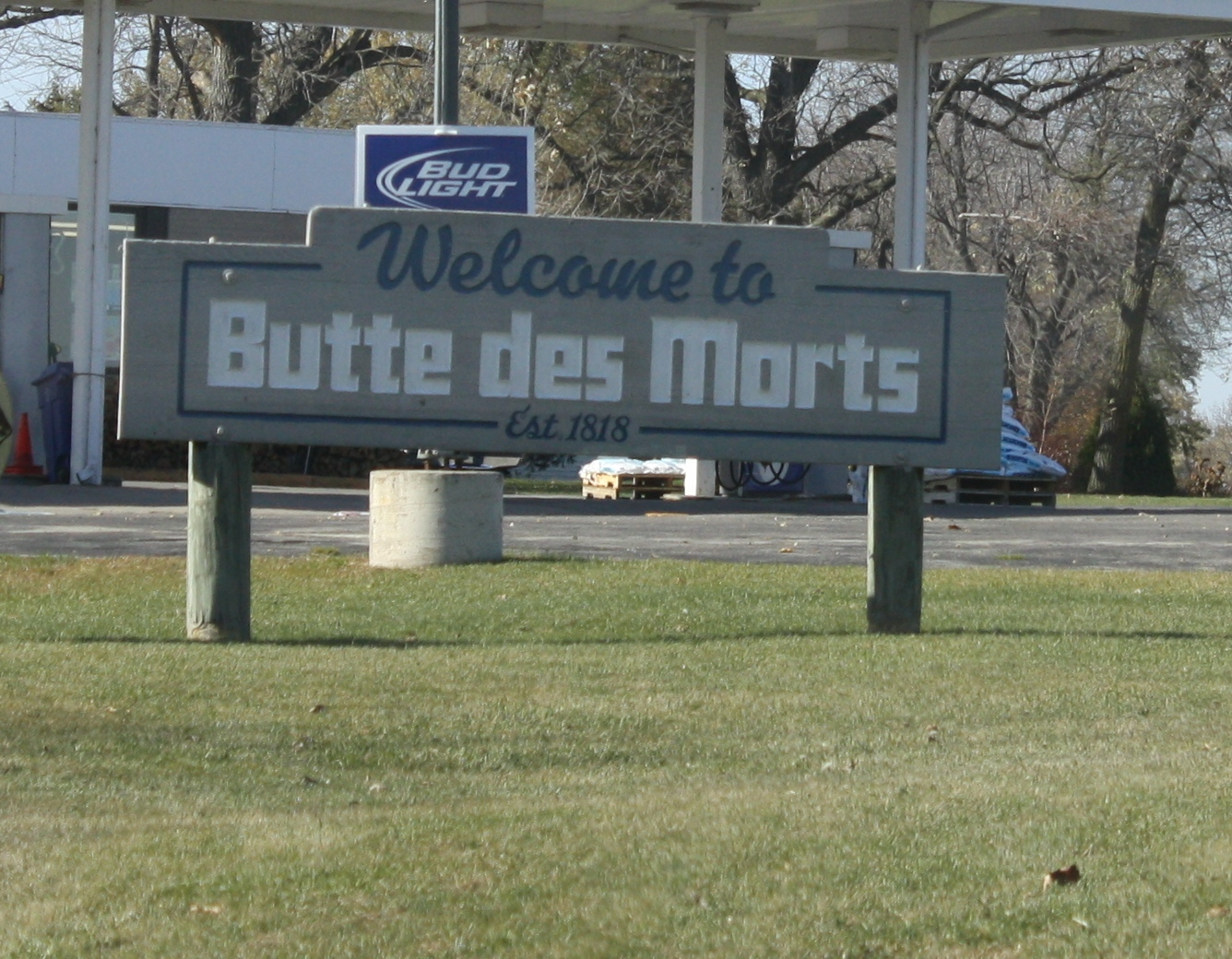
City welcome sign

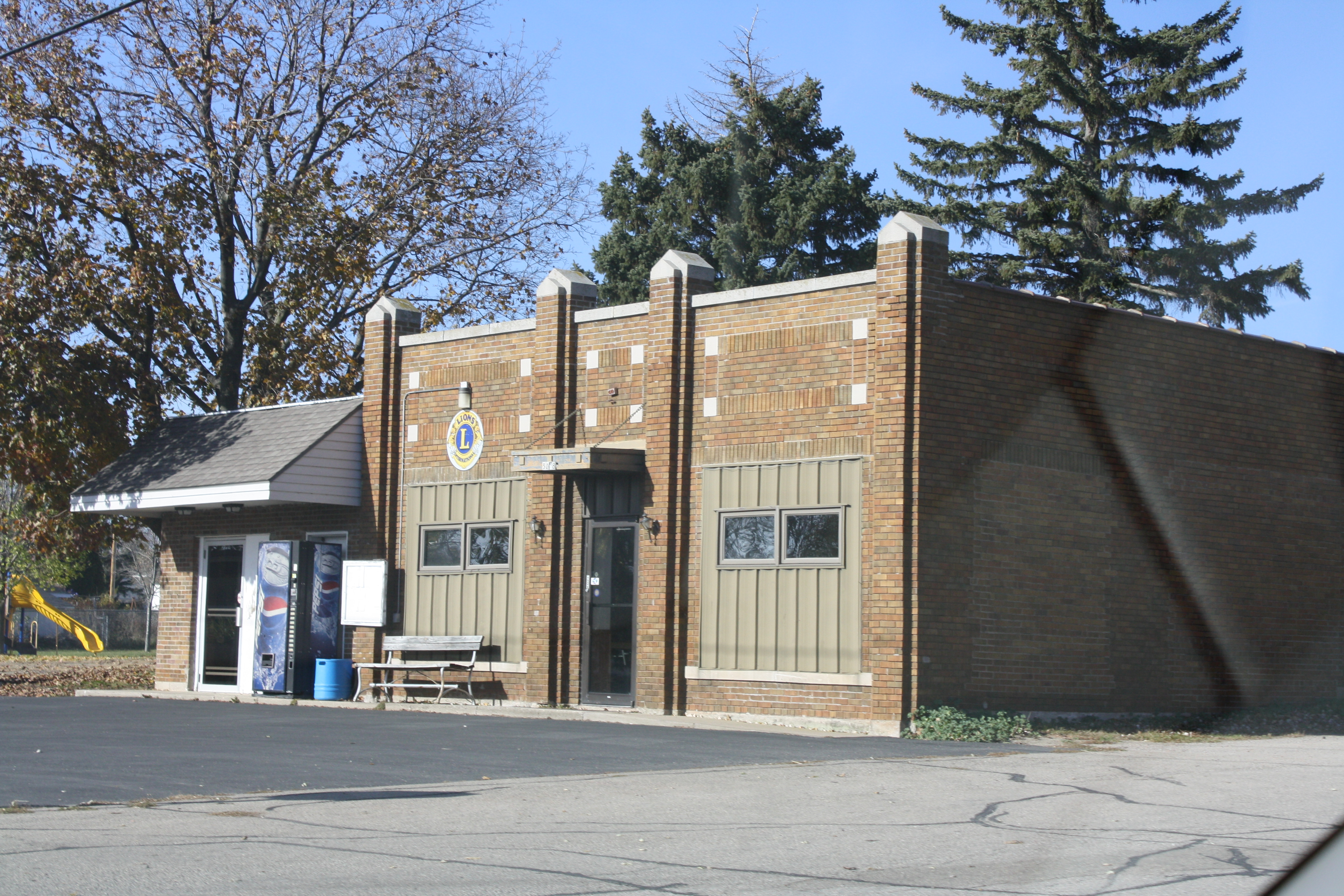
Lions club

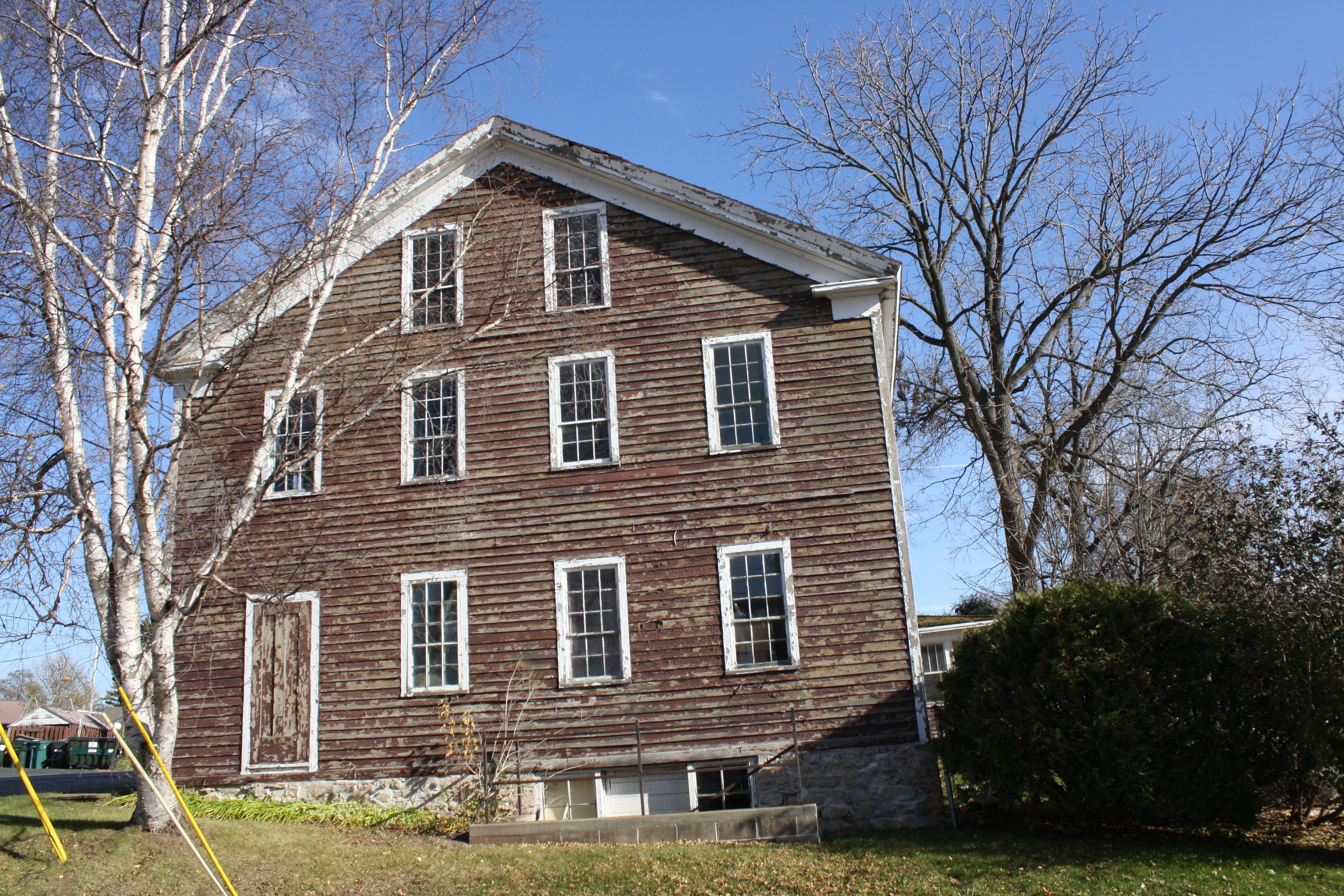
Austin Grignon Hotel

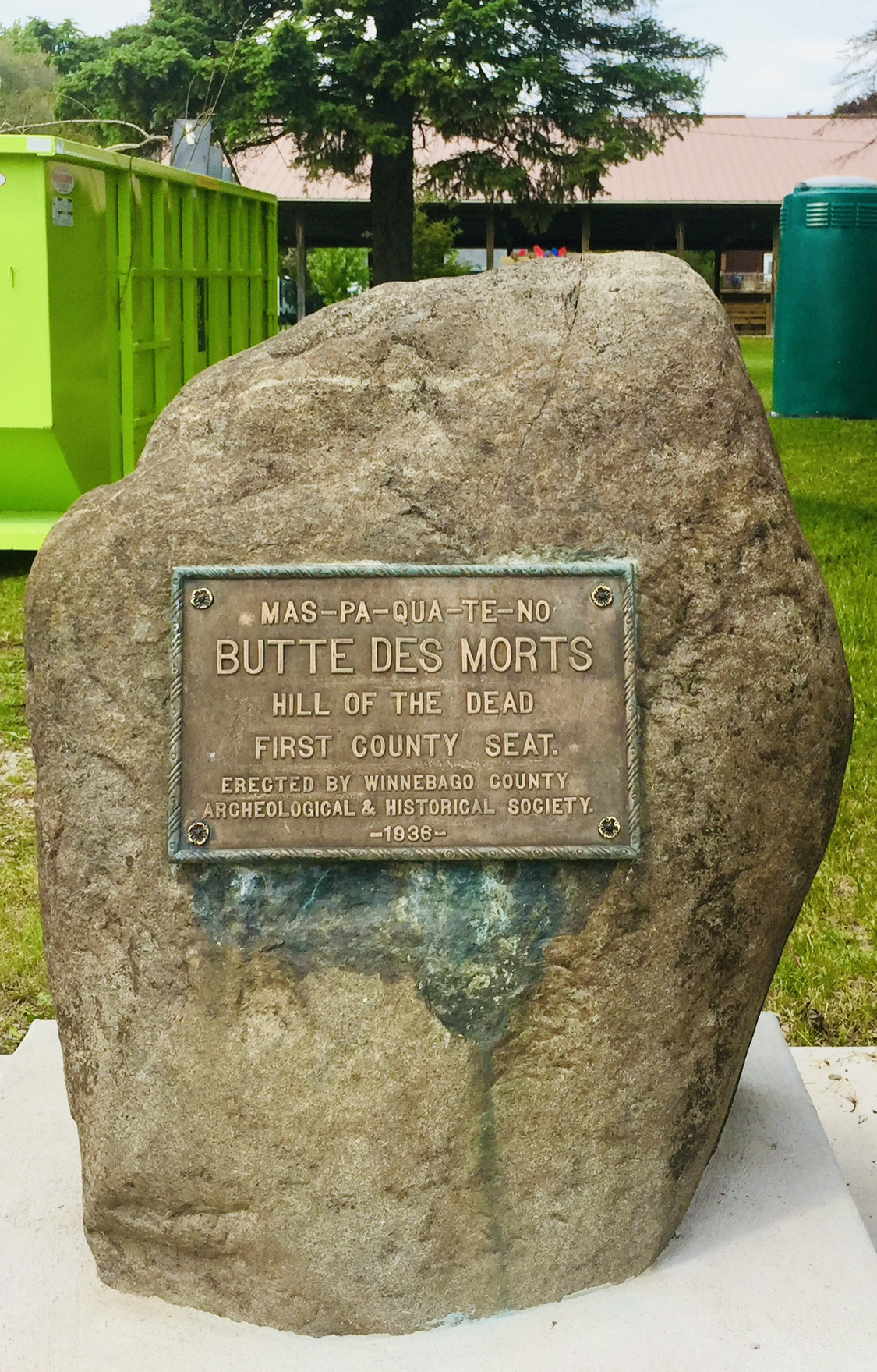
historical plaque
