= Allenville, Wisconsin =

- Unincorporated community
- Location within Wisconsin Location within the United States
- Coordinates: 44°07′59″N 88°37′08″W
- Country: United States
- State: Wisconsin
- County: Winnebago
- Elevation: 817 ft (249 m)

Population (5/2/2021)
  - Total: 28
- Time zone: UTC-6 (Central (CST))
  - Summer (DST): UTC-5 (CDT)
- Area code: 920
- GNIS feature ID: 1560782

Allenville is an unincorporated community located in the town of Vinland, Winnebago County, Wisconsin, United States.

Allenville was named for Timothy Allen, an original owner of the town site. A post office operated in Allenville from 1883 to 1955.
