= Snells, Wisconsin =

- Unincorporated community
- Location within Wisconsin Location within the United States
- Coordinates: 44°08′30″N 88°29′26″W
- Country: United States
- State: Wisconsin
- County: Winnebago
- Elevation: 758 ft (231 m)
- Time zone: UTC-6 (Central (CST))
  - Summer (DST): UTC-5 (CDT)
- Area code: 920
- GNIS feature ID: 1577827

Snells is an unincorporated community in the town of Neenah, Winnebago County, Wisconsin, United States.

== Etymology ==
Snells was named for a local landowner.
