= Algoma, Winnebago County, Wisconsin =

Algoma, Wisconsin
- Town
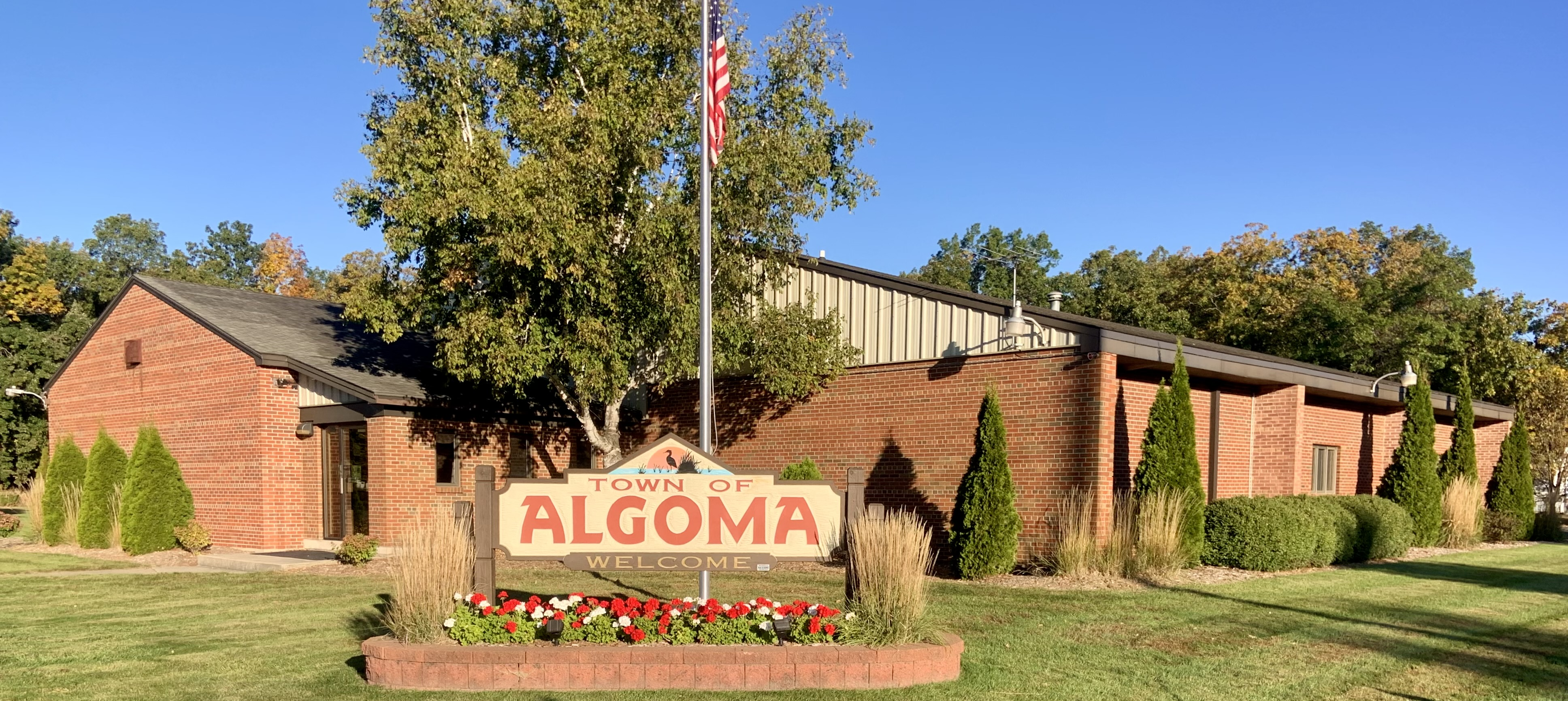
- Town hall

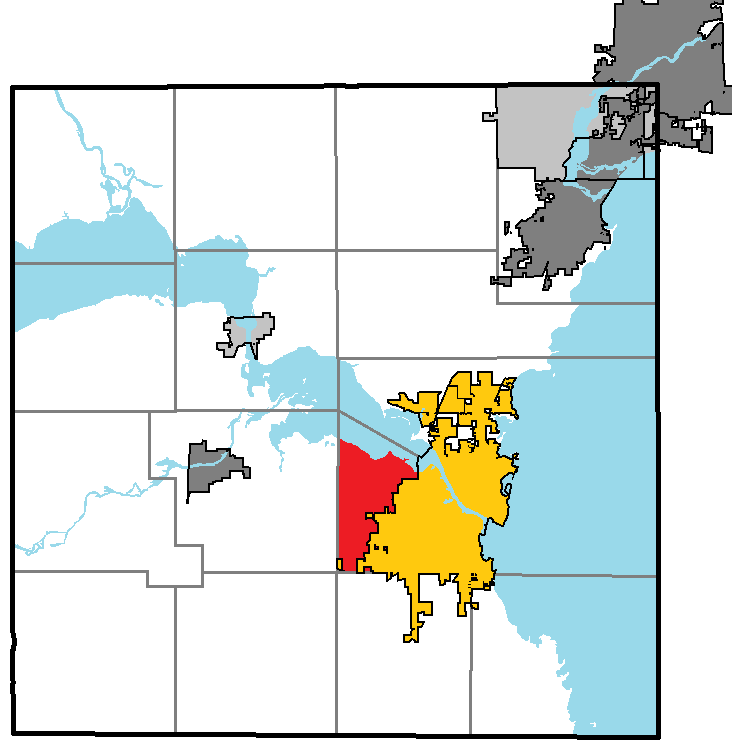
- Location of Algoma, within Winnebago County, Wisconsin
- Coordinates: 44°1′08″N 88°36′15″W
- Country: United States
- State: Wisconsin
- County: Winnebago

Area
  - Total: 11.2 sq mi (28.9 km^{2})
  - Land: 8.8 sq mi (22.7 km^{2})
  - Water: 2.4 sq mi (6.2 km^{2})
- Elevation: 781 ft (238 m)

Population (2020)
  - Total: 6,866
  - Density: 783/sq mi (302/km^{2})
- Time zone: UTC-6 (Central (CST))
  - Summer (DST): UTC-5 (CDT)
- Area code: 920
- FIPS code: 55-01025
- GNIS feature ID: 1582673
- Website: townofalgomawi.gov

Algoma is a town in Winnebago County, Wisconsin, United States. The population was 6,866 at the 2020 census. The unincorporated communities of Highland Shore, Leonards Point, Melrose Park, and Oakwood are located in the town.

== History ==
The community was established in 1851 as "Wolf River", a loose translation of a native term. The town was renamed "Algoma" (native term for "park of flowers") in 1871. Over the years, the community has shifted from commercial fishing to tourism.

== Geography ==
According to the United States Census Bureau, the town has a total area of 11.2 square miles (28.9 km^{2}), of which 8.8 square miles (22.7 km^{2}) is land and 2.4 square miles (6.2 km^{2}), or 21.42%, is water.

Algoma is located on the shore of Lake Butte des Morts, an arm of Lake Winnebago formed by the inflow of the Wolf River and Fox River, and is west of Oshkosh at the junction of state highways 41 and 21.

== Demographics ==
As of the census of 2000, there were 5,702 people, 1,940 households, and 1,672 families residing in the town. The population density was 569.3 people per square mile (219.7/km^{2}). There were 1,983 housing units at an average density of 198.0 per square mile (76.4/km^{2}). The racial makeup of the town was 97.91% White, 0.19% African American, 0.14% Native American, 1.00% Asian, 0.14% from other races, and 0.61% from two or more races. Hispanic or Latino of any race were 0.70% of the population.

There were 1,940 households, out of which 45.6% had children under the age of 18 living with them, 80.2% were married couples living together, 4.4% had a female householder with no husband present, and 13.8% were non-families. 10.7% of all households were made up of individuals, and 4.1% had someone living alone who was 65 years of age or older. The average household size was 2.94 and the average family size was 3.17.

In the town, the population was spread out, with 30.9% under the age of 18, 4.8% from 18 to 24, 30.8% from 25 to 44, 25.1% from 45 to 64, and 8.4% who were 65 years of age or older. The median age was 37 years. For every 100 females, there were 100.6 males. For every 100 females age 18 and over, there were 98.2 males.

The median income for a household in the town was $71,792, and the median income for a family was $74,684. Males had a median income of $48,864 versus $28,089 for females. The per capita income for the town was $27,478. About 0.3% of families and 1.6% of the population were below the poverty line, including 1.4% of those under age 18 and 4.2% of those age 65 or over.
