= Herman E. Manuel =

American businessman and politician

Herman E. Manuel (January 8, 1849 – June 20, 1918) was an American businessman and politician.

Manuel was born in the town of Vinland, Wisconsin and then moved to Oshkosh, Wisconsin in 1871. He was a bookkeeper and manufacturer of steam pipes and other machinery and retired in 1894. Manual served in the Wisconsin State Assembly in 1901 and was a Republican. Manuel died in a hospital in Oshkosh, Wisconsin.
