= Zittau, Wisconsin =

- Unincorporated community
- Location within Wisconsin Location within the United States
- Coordinates: 44°13′00″N 88°47′10″W
- Country: United States
- State: Wisconsin
- County: Winnebago
- Elevation: 774 ft (236 m)
- Time zone: UTC-6 (Central (CST))
  - Summer (DST): UTC-5 (CDT)
- Area code: 920
- GNIS feature ID: 1577182

Zittau is an unincorporated community located in the town of Wolf River, Winnebago County, Wisconsin, United States.

== Economy ==
Zittau is home to the Union Star Cheese Factory, producer of numerous Wisconsin cheese varieties, including daily cheese curds.
