= Vinland, Wisconsin =

- Town
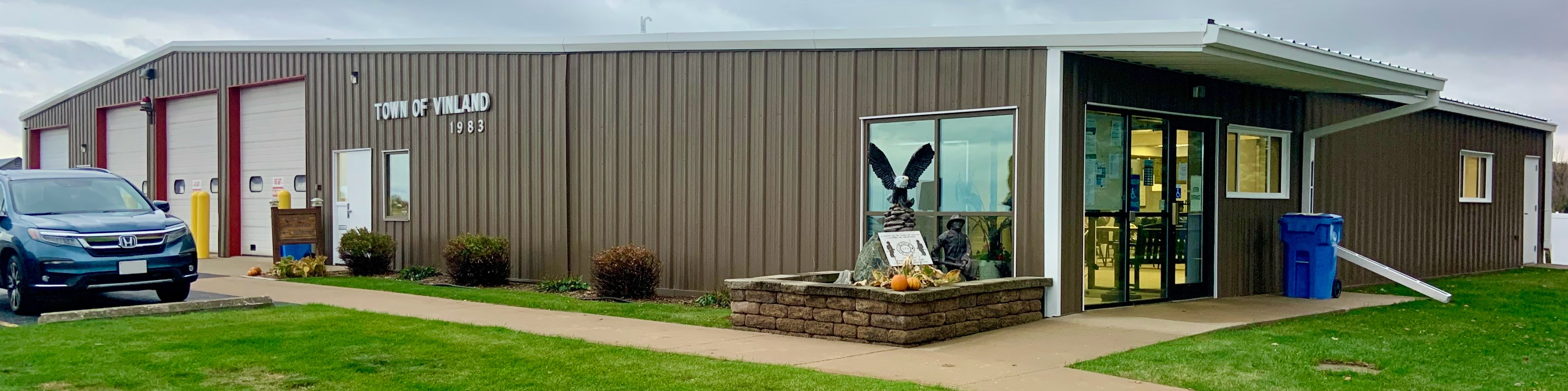
- Town hall

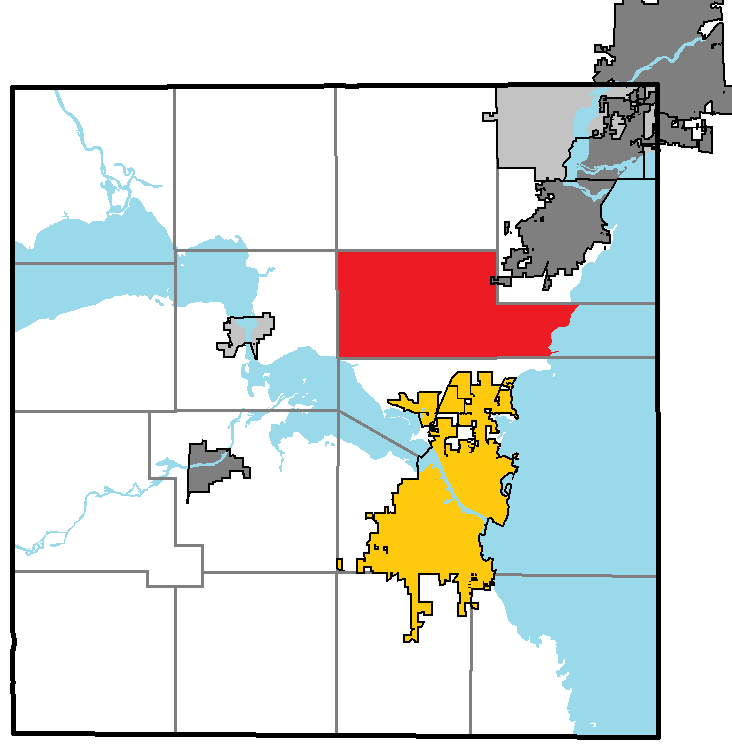
- Location of Vinland, within Winnebago County
- Coordinates: 44°07′35″N 88°34′00″W
- Country: United States
- State: Wisconsin
- County: Winnebago

Area
  - Total: 36.3 sq mi (93.9 km^{2})
  - Land: 28.6 sq mi (74.1 km^{2})
  - Water: 7.6 sq mi (19.8 km^{2})
- Elevation: 814 ft (248 m)

Population (2020)
  - Total: 1,769
  - Density: 61.8/sq mi (23.9/km^{2})
- Time zone: UTC-6 (Central (CST))
  - Summer (DST): UTC-5 (CDT)
- Area code: 920
- FIPS code: 55-82875
- GNIS feature ID: 1584333
- Website: townofvinlandwi.gov

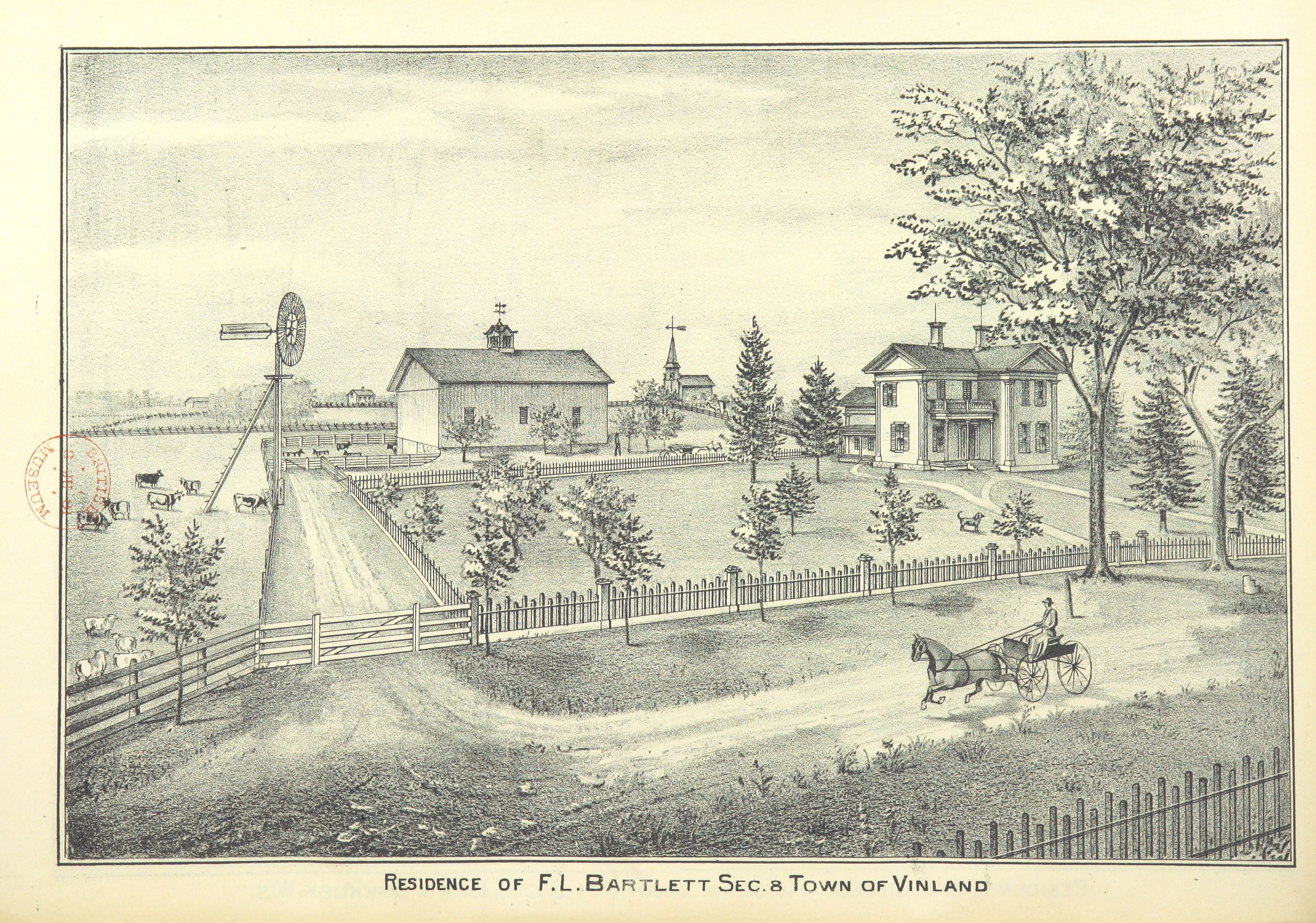
Residence of F.L. Bartlett, Vinland, 19th century.

Vinland is a town in Winnebago County, Wisconsin, United States. The population was 1,769 at the 2020 census. The unincorporated community of Allenville is located in the town.

== Geography ==
According to the United States Census Bureau, the town has a total area of 36.3 square miles (93.9 km^{2}), of which 28.6 square miles (74.1 km^{2}) is land and 7.6 square miles (19.8 km^{2}), or 21.10%, is water.

== Demographics ==
As of the census of 2000, there were 1,849 people, 693 households, and 553 families residing in the town. The population density was 63.7 people per square mile (24.6/km^{2}). There were 721 housing units at an average density of 24.8 per square mile (9.6/km^{2}). The racial makeup of the town was 98.65% White, 0.54% African American, 0.22% Native American, 0.22% Asian, 0.11% Pacific Islander, 0.16% from other races, and 0.11% from two or more races. Hispanic or Latino of any race were 0.49% of the population.

There were 693 households, out of which 32.6% had children under the age of 18 living with them, 72.7% were married couples living together, 3.2% had a female householder with no husband present, and 20.1% were non-families. 15.4% of all households were made up of individuals, and 6.3% had someone living alone who was 65 years of age or older. The average household size was 2.67 and the average family size was 2.97.

In the town, the population was spread out, with 25.5% under the age of 18, 5.1% from 18 to 24, 27.5% from 25 to 44, 30.7% from 45 to 64, and 11.1% who were 65 years of age or older. The median age was 40 years. For every 100 females, there were 101.4 males. For every 100 females age 18 and over, there were 104.3 males.

The median income for a household in the town was $64,338, and the median income for a family was $70,000. Males had a median income of $42,201 versus $30,446 for females. The per capita income for the town was $26,033. About 1.9% of families and 2.4% of the population were below the poverty line, including 2.6% of those under age 18 and 2.8% of those age 65 or over.

== Notable people ==
- Herman E. Manuel, politician and businessman, was born in the town
