= Winnebago County, Wisconsin =

County in Wisconsin, United States

- County
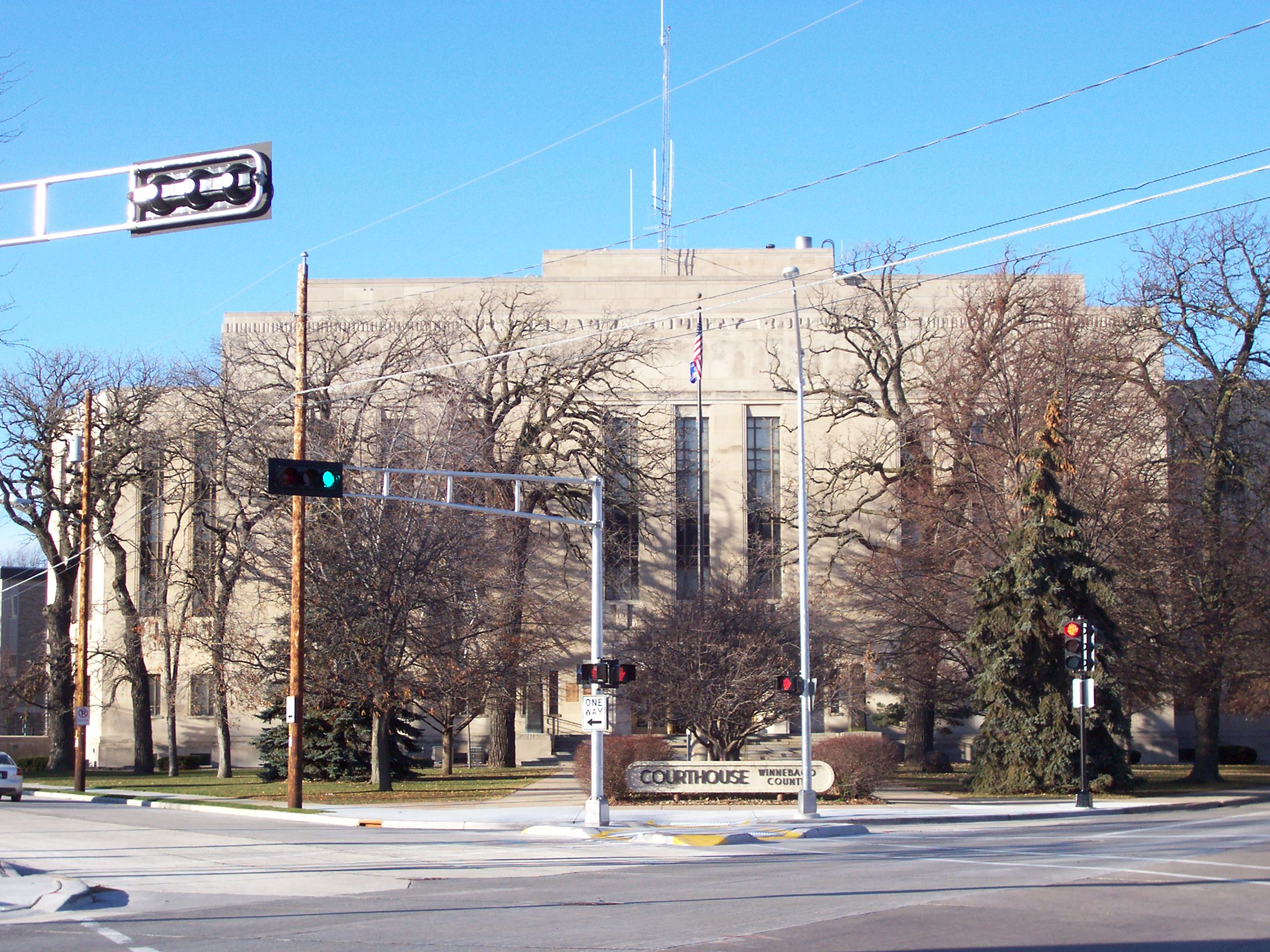
- Winnebago County Courthouse

- Location within the U.S. state of Wisconsin
- Coordinates: 44°04′N 88°38′W
- Country: United States
- State: Wisconsin
- Founded: 1848
- Named for: Winnebago people
- Seat: Oshkosh
- Largest city: Oshkosh

Area
  - Total: 579 sq mi (1,500 km^{2})
  - Land: 434 sq mi (1,120 km^{2})
  - Water: 144 sq mi (370 km^{2}) 25%

Population (2020)
  - Total: 171,730
  - Estimate (2025): 174,218 ▲
  - Density: 395.1/sq mi (152.5/km^{2})
- Time zone: UTC−6 (Central)
  - Summer (DST): UTC−5 (CDT)
- Congressional districts: 6th, 8th
- Website: www.winnebagocountywi.gov

Winnebago County is a county in the U.S. state of Wisconsin. As of the 2020 census, the population was 171,730. Its county seat is Oshkosh. It was named for the historic Winnebago people, a federally recognized Native American tribe now known as the Ho-Chunk Nation. Chief Oshkosh was a Menominee leader in the area. Winnebago County comprises the Oshkosh-Neenah, WI Metropolitan Statistical Area, which is included in the Appleton-Oshkosh-Neenah, WI Combined Statistical Area.

== History ==
The region was occupied by several Native American tribes in the period of European encounter, including the Sauk, Meskwaki, Menominee, and Ojibwe. French traders from what is now Canada had early interactions with them, as did French Jesuit missionaries, who sought to convert them to Catholicism. European and American settlement encroached on their traditional territories, and the United States negotiated treaties in the mid-19th century to keep pushing the Indians to the west.

Winnebago County was created in 1840 by European Americans and organized in 1848. The name Winnebago is of Algonquin origin, with variations used by the Fox and Potowatomi to refer to the Fox River below Lake Winnebago, which sometimes got muddy and full of fish. It means 'people dwelling by the fetid or ill-smelling water', which may also refer to a sulfur spring. The county seat, Oshkosh, was incorporated as a city in 1853, when it already had a population of nearly 2,800.

Chief Oshkosh was the namesake for the county seat. A leader of the Menominee in the region, he was successful in gaining authorization from the federal government for 2500 of his people to remain in Wisconsin, at a time when the government was pushing for their removal west of the Mississippi River.

== Geography ==
According to the U.S. Census Bureau, the county has a total area of 579 square miles (1,500 km^{2}), of which 434 square miles (1,120 km^{2}) is land and 144 square miles (370 km^{2}) (25%) is water.

=== Adjacent counties ===
- Waupaca County - northwest
- Outagamie County - northeast
- Calumet County - east
- Fond du Lac County - south
- Green Lake County - southwest
- Waushara County - west

=== Major highways ===
- Interstate 41
- U.S. Highway 10
- U.S. Highway 41
- U.S. Highway 45
- Wisconsin Highway 21
- Wisconsin Highway 26
- Wisconsin Highway 44
- Wisconsin Highway 47
- Wisconsin Highway 76
- Wisconsin Highway 91
- Wisconsin Highway 114
- Wisconsin Highway 116
- Wisconsin Highway 441

=== Railroads ===
- Canadian National
- Wisconsin and Southern Railroad

=== Buses ===
- GO Transit (Wisconsin)
- Valley Transit (Wisconsin)

=== Airports ===
Wittman Regional Airport (KOSH) serves the county and surrounding communities.

Brennand Airport (79C) in the Town of Clayton is a major recreational aircraft hub year-round.

Commercial airline service for Winnebago County is provided by Appleton International Airport in the neighboring Outagamie County.

== Demographics ==
Historical population
| Census | Pop. | Note | %± |
|---|---|---|---|
| 1840 | 135 | | — |
| 1850 | 10,167 | | 7,431.1% |
| 1860 | 23,770 | | 133.8% |
| 1870 | 37,279 | | 56.8% |
| 1880 | 42,740 | | 14.6% |
| 1890 | 50,097 | | 17.2% |
| 1900 | 58,225 | | 16.2% |
| 1910 | 62,116 | | 6.7% |
| 1920 | 63,897 | | 2.9% |
| 1930 | 76,622 | | 19.9% |
| 1940 | 80,507 | | 5.1% |
| 1950 | 91,103 | | 13.2% |
| 1960 | 107,928 | | 18.5% |
| 1970 | 129,931 | | 20.4% |
| 1980 | 131,703 | | 1.4% |
| 1990 | 140,320 | | 6.5% |
| 2000 | 156,763 | | 11.7% |
| 2010 | 166,994 | | 6.5% |
| 2020 | 171,730 | | 2.8% |
| 2025 (est.) | 174,218 | ▲ | 1.4% |
U.S. Decennial Census; 1790–1960 1900–1990; 1990–2000 2010–2020

=== Racial and ethnic composition ===
Winnebago County, Wisconsin – Racial and ethnic composition Note: the US Census treats Hispanic/Latino as an ethnic category. This table excludes Latinos from the racial categories and assigns them to a separate category. Hispanics/Latinos may be of any race.
| Race / Ethnicity (NH = Non-Hispanic) | Pop 1980 | Pop 1990 | Pop 2000 | Pop 2010 | Pop 2020 | % 1980 | % 1990 | % 2000 | % 2010 | % 2020 |
|---|---|---|---|---|---|---|---|---|---|---|
| White alone (NH) | 129,584 | 136,094 | 147,160 | 151,509 | 145,581 | 98.39% | 96.99% | 93.87% | 90.73% | 84.77% |
| Black or African American alone (NH) | 379 | 689 | 1,725 | 2,856 | 4,931 | 0.29% | 0.49% | 1.10% | 1.71% | 2.87% |
| Native American or Alaska Native alone (NH) | 494 | 668 | 678 | 941 | 935 | 0.38% | 0.48% | 0.43% | 0.56% | 0.54% |
| Asian alone (NH) | 432 | 1,690 | 2,849 | 3,795 | 5,560 | 0.33% | 1.20% | 1.82% | 2.27% | 3.24% |
| Native Hawaiian or Pacific Islander alone (NH) | x | x | 26 | 52 | 53 | x | x | 0.02% | 0.03% | 0.03% |
| Other race alone (NH) | 95 | 35 | 58 | 88 | 362 | 0.07% | 0.02% | 0.04% | 0.05% | 0.21% |
| Mixed race or Multiracial (NH) | x | x | 1,202 | 1,969 | 5,980 | x | x | 0.77% | 1.18% | 3.48% |
| Hispanic or Latino (any race) | 719 | 1,144 | 3,065 | 5,784 | 8,328 | 0.55% | 0.82% | 1.96% | 3.46% | 4.85% |
| Total | 131,703 | 140,320 | 156,763 | 166,994 | 171,730 | 100.00% | 100.00% | 100.00% | 100.00% | 100.00% |

=== 2020 census ===
As of the 2020 census, the county had a population of 171,730 and a median age of 39.1 years. 20.7% of residents were under the age of 18 and 17.0% of residents were 65 years of age or older. For every 100 females there were 101.2 males, and for every 100 females age 18 and over there were 100.2 males age 18 and over.

The population density was 395.1 people per square mile (152.5 people/km^{2}). There were 76,046 housing units at an average density of 174.9 units per square mile (67.5 units/km^{2}), of which 6.0% were vacant. There were 71,473 households in the county, of which 26.1% had children under the age of 18 living in them. Of all households, 45.3% were married-couple households, 20.7% were households with a male householder and no spouse or partner present, and 25.4% were households with a female householder and no spouse or partner present. About 31.8% of all households were made up of individuals and 12.4% had someone living alone who was 65 years of age or older. Among occupied housing units, 64.7% were owner-occupied and 35.3% were renter-occupied, with a homeowner vacancy rate of 0.9% and a rental vacancy rate of 4.8%.

82.6% of residents lived in urban areas, while 17.4% lived in rural areas.

The racial makeup of the county was 86.2% White, 3.0% Black or African American, 0.7% American Indian and Alaska Native, 3.3% Asian, <0.1% Native Hawaiian and Pacific Islander, 1.8% from some other race, and 5.1% from two or more races. Hispanic or Latino residents of any race comprised 4.8% of the population.

2000 Census Age Pyramid for Winnebago County

=== 2000 census ===
As of the census of 2000, there were 156,763 people, 61,157 households, and 39,568 families residing in the county. The population density was 357 people per square mile (138 people/km^{2}). There were 64,721 housing units at an average density of 148 units per square mile (57 units/km^{2}). The racial makeup of the county was 94.92% White, 1.12% Black or African American, 0.46% Native American, 1.84% Asian, 0.02% Pacific Islander, 0.72% from other races, and 0.92% from two or more races. 1.96% of the population were Hispanic or Latino of any race. 52.4% were of German, 6.2% Irish and 5.7% Polish ancestry. 94.6% spoke English, 2.5% Spanish and 1.0% Hmong as their first language.

There were 61,157 households, out of which 31.00% had children under the age of 18 living with them, 53.00% were married couples living together, 8.30% had a female householder with no husband present, and 35.30% were non-families. 27.60% of all households were made up of individuals, and 9.90% had someone living alone who was 65 years of age or older. The average household size was 2.43 and the average family size was 2.99.

By age, 23.80% of the population was under 18, 11.80% from 18 to 24, 30.40% from 25 to 44, 21.50% from 45 to 64, and 12.50% were 65 or older. The median age was 35 years. For every 100 females there were 99.40 males. For every 100 females age 18 and over, there were 97.80 males.

In 2017, there were 1,833 births, giving a general fertility rate of 56.5 births per 1,000 women aged 15–44, the 15th lowest rate out of all 72 Wisconsin counties. Additionally, there were 123 reported induced abortions performed on women of Winnebago County residence in 2017.

== Government ==
Winnebago County is governed by the 36-member Winnebago County Board of Supervisors. Supervisors are elected to the board in a nonpartisan election held the first Tuesday of April in even numbered years and serve two-year terms. The board has several committees. It meets on the third Tuesday of each month at the Winnebago County Courthouse in Oshkosh.

=== Politics ===
United States presidential election results for Winnebago County, Wisconsin
| Year | Republican | | Democratic | | Third party(ies) | |
| Year | No. | % | No. | % | No. | % |
|---|---|---|---|---|---|---|
| 1892 | 5,354 | 45.06% | 5,893 | 49.60% | 635 | 5.34% |
| 1896 | 7,898 | 59.23% | 5,089 | 38.17% | 347 | 2.60% |
| 1900 | 7,467 | 55.67% | 5,605 | 41.78% | 342 | 2.55% |
| 1904 | 7,720 | 62.63% | 4,006 | 32.50% | 600 | 4.87% |
| 1908 | 6,797 | 52.24% | 5,511 | 42.36% | 703 | 5.40% |
| 1912 | 1,922 | 17.01% | 4,631 | 41.00% | 4,743 | 41.99% |
| 1916 | 5,923 | 50.49% | 5,242 | 44.69% | 566 | 4.82% |
| 1920 | 12,035 | 69.53% | 3,397 | 19.63% | 1,876 | 10.84% |
| 1924 | 11,239 | 48.70% | 1,801 | 7.80% | 10,038 | 43.50% |
| 1928 | 16,191 | 61.10% | 9,995 | 37.72% | 315 | 1.19% |
| 1932 | 11,505 | 41.31% | 15,591 | 55.98% | 756 | 2.71% |
| 1936 | 11,679 | 36.93% | 18,522 | 58.57% | 1,420 | 4.49% |
| 1940 | 18,697 | 54.14% | 15,570 | 45.08% | 268 | 0.78% |
| 1944 | 19,310 | 59.56% | 12,841 | 39.61% | 269 | 0.83% |
| 1948 | 17,165 | 55.18% | 13,116 | 42.16% | 829 | 2.66% |
| 1952 | 28,172 | 68.17% | 13,016 | 31.49% | 140 | 0.34% |
| 1956 | 28,759 | 71.44% | 11,115 | 27.61% | 380 | 0.94% |
| 1960 | 28,598 | 61.72% | 17,656 | 38.11% | 80 | 0.17% |
| 1964 | 21,084 | 47.03% | 23,636 | 52.72% | 115 | 0.26% |
| 1968 | 25,361 | 53.84% | 18,605 | 39.50% | 3,138 | 6.66% |
| 1972 | 29,488 | 57.28% | 20,450 | 39.72% | 1,544 | 3.00% |
| 1976 | 32,149 | 55.35% | 24,485 | 42.16% | 1,448 | 2.49% |
| 1980 | 34,286 | 53.28% | 24,203 | 37.61% | 5,864 | 9.11% |
| 1984 | 39,014 | 62.74% | 22,791 | 36.65% | 378 | 0.61% |
| 1988 | 35,085 | 54.82% | 28,508 | 44.54% | 410 | 0.64% |
| 1992 | 33,709 | 43.56% | 27,234 | 35.19% | 16,443 | 21.25% |
| 1996 | 27,880 | 42.73% | 29,564 | 45.31% | 7,803 | 11.96% |
| 2000 | 38,330 | 50.38% | 33,983 | 44.67% | 3,767 | 4.95% |
| 2004 | 46,542 | 52.53% | 40,943 | 46.21% | 1,111 | 1.25% |
| 2008 | 37,946 | 43.28% | 48,167 | 54.94% | 1,564 | 1.78% |
| 2012 | 42,122 | 47.24% | 45,449 | 50.97% | 1,602 | 1.80% |
| 2016 | 43,445 | 49.86% | 37,047 | 42.52% | 6,643 | 7.62% |
| 2020 | 47,796 | 50.83% | 44,060 | 46.86% | 2,176 | 2.31% |
| 2024 | 49,179 | 51.57% | 44,660 | 46.83% | 1,532 | 1.61% |

Winnebago County was a longtime Republican stronghold, only tending to vote Democratic in national landslides. After 1964 it was not won by a Democrat until Bill Clinton won by a narrow plurality in 1996 due to large third-party performance. Since then, it has voted Republican with the exception of a heavy leftward swing in support of Barack Obama in 2008, and continued (though narrower) support for him again in 2012. It has voted for the winning presidential candidate in every election since 1980, except in 1992 when it supported George H. W. Bush, and in 2020, when it supported Donald Trump.

== Communities ==
=== Cities ===
- Appleton (mostly in Outagamie County and Calumet County)
- Menasha (partly in Calumet County)
- Neenah
- Omro
- Oshkosh (county seat)

=== Villages ===
- Fox Crossing
- Winneconne

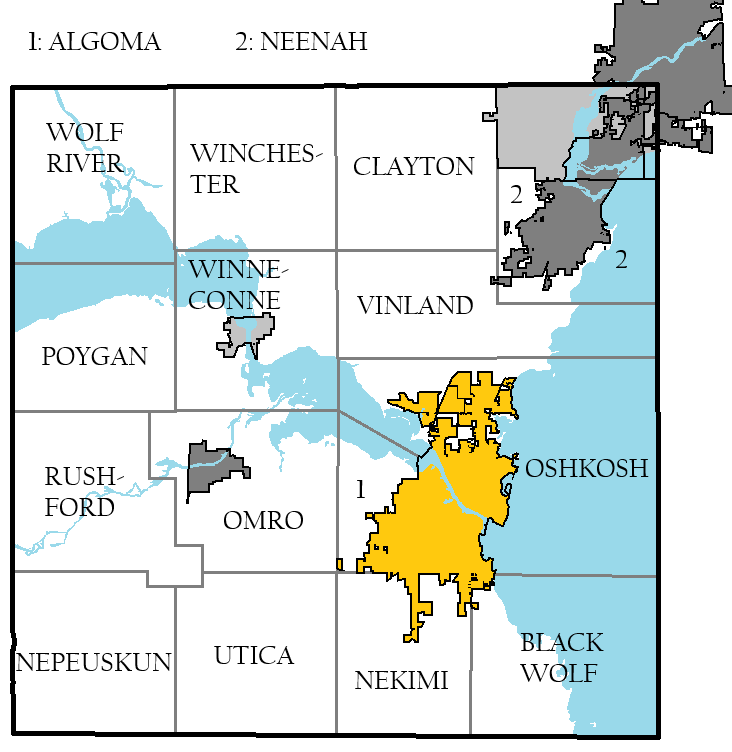
Towns of Winnebago County

=== Towns ===
- Algoma
- Black Wolf
- Clayton
- Neenah
- Nekimi
- Nepeuskun
- Omro
- Oshkosh
- Poygan
- Rushford
- Utica
- Vinland
- Winchester
- Winneconne
- Wolf River

=== Census-designated places ===
- Butte des Morts
- Eureka
- Waukau
- Winchester

=== Unincorporated communities ===
- Adella Beach
- Allenville
- Black Wolf
- Black Wolf Point
- Clarks Point
- Decorah Beach
- Elo
- Fairview Beach
- Fisk
- Fitzgerald
- Harbor Springs
- Highland Shore
- Indian Shores
- Island Park
- Larsen
- Lasleys Point
- Leonards Point
- Little Point
- Koro
- Medina Junction
- Melrose Park
- Metz (partial)
- Mikesville
- Nichols Shore Acres
- Oakwood
- Orihula
- Paukotuk
- Piacenza
- Pickett
- Plummer Point
- Point Comfort
- Reighmoor
- Ricker Bay
- Ring
- Rivermoor
- Rush Lake
- Shangri La Point
- Snells
- Sunrise Bay
- Waverly Beach (partial)
- Winnebago
- Zion
- Zittau

=== Ghost towns/neighborhoods ===
- Delhi
- Menasha (former)

== Notable people ==
- Martin Madison (born 1854, Winnebago County), South Dakota politician

== See also ==
- National Register of Historic Places listings in Winnebago County, Wisconsin
