= Black Wolf, Wisconsin =

- Town
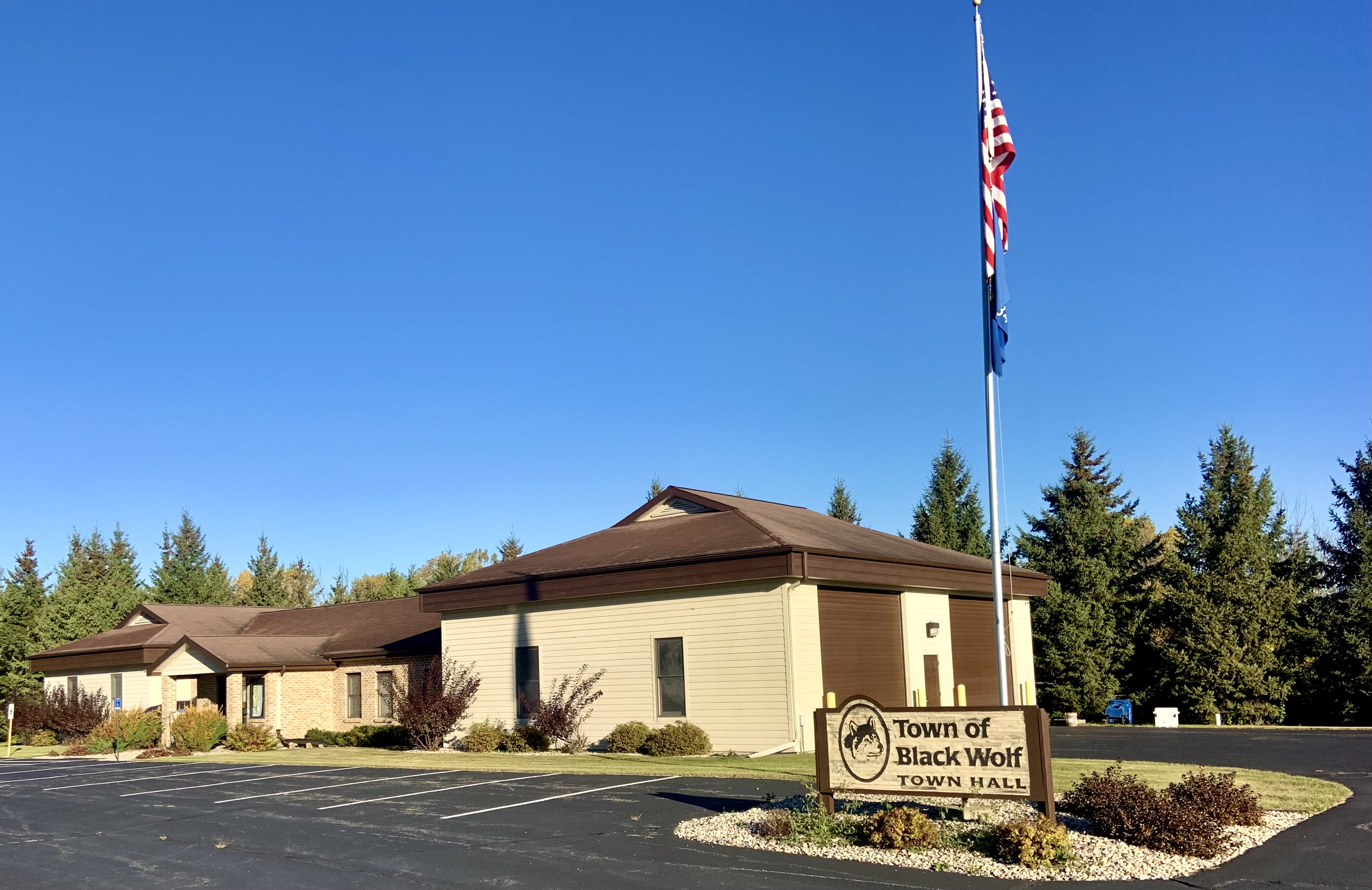
- Town hall

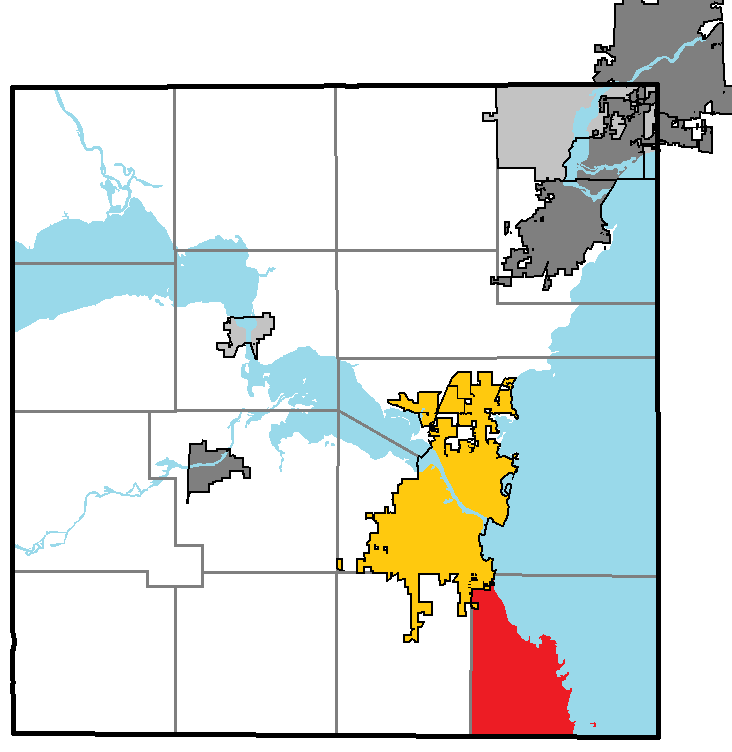
- Location of Black Wolf, within Winnebago County
- Coordinates: 43°56′14″N 88°30′12″W
- Country: United States
- State: Wisconsin
- County: Winnebago

Government
  - Mayor: Alex Dukelow

Area
  - Total: 41.7 sq mi (108.0 km^{2})
  - Land: 15.5 sq mi (40.1 km^{2})
  - Water: 26.2 sq mi (67.9 km^{2})
- Elevation: 748 ft (228 m)

Population (2020)
  - Total: 2,429
  - Density: 157/sq mi (60.6/km^{2})
- Time zone: UTC-6 (Central (CST))
  - Summer (DST): UTC-5 (CDT)
- Area code: 920
- FIPS code: 55-08000
- GNIS feature ID: 1582824
- Website: www.townofblackwolf.com

Black Wolf is a town in Winnebago County, Wisconsin, United States. The population was 2,429 at the 2020 census. The unincorporated communities of Black Wolf, Black Wolf Point, Little Point, Paukotuk, and Point Comfort are located in the town.

== Geography ==
According to the United States Census Bureau, the town has a total area of 41.7 square miles (108.0 km^{2}), of which 15.5 square miles (40.1 km^{2}) is land and 26.2 square miles (67.9 km^{2}), or 62.88%, is water, consisting primarily of Lake Winnebago.

== Demographics ==
Historical population
Census	Pop.	Note	%±
2000	2,330		—
2010	2,410		3.4%
2020	2,429		0.8%
U.S. Decennial Census

As of the census of 2000, there were 2,330 people, 916 households, and 716 families residing in the town. The population density was 149.7 people per square mile (57.8/km^{2}). There were 1,010 housing units at an average density of 64.9 per square mile (25.1/km^{2}). The racial makeup of the town was 99.06% White, 0.09% African American, 0.21% Native American, 0.30% Asian, 0.04% from other races, and 0.30% from two or more races. Hispanic or Latino of any race were 0.77% of the population.

There were 916 households, out of which 30.2% had children under the age of 18 living with them, 72.2% were married couples living together, 3.4% had a female householder with no husband present, and 21.8% were non-families. 18.1% of all households were made up of individuals, and 7.6% had someone living alone who was 65 years of age or older. The average household size was 2.54 and the average family size was 2.86.

In the town, the population was spread out, with 22.6% under the age of 18, 4.6% from 18 to 24, 25.8% from 25 to 44, 32.4% from 45 to 64, and 14.5% who were 65 years of age or older. The median age was 43 years. For every 100 females, there were 106.2 males. For every 100 females age 18 and over, there were 107.0 males.

The median income for a household in the town was $53,405, and the median income for a family was $61,514. Males had a median income of $37,055 versus $26,420 for females. The per capita income for the town was $26,769. About 1.3% of families and 1.8% of the population were below the poverty line, including 1.5% of those under age 18 and 0.9% of those age 65 or over.

== Notable people ==
- Frederic A. Morgan, farmer and chairman of the Black Wolf town board, was a member of the Wisconsin State Assembly in 1871
- Charles Neitzel, farmer, businessman, and politician, was born in the town, was on the town board, and lived here until he retired and moved to Oshkosh
