= Oshkosh (town), Wisconsin =

Oshkosh, Wisconsin
- Town
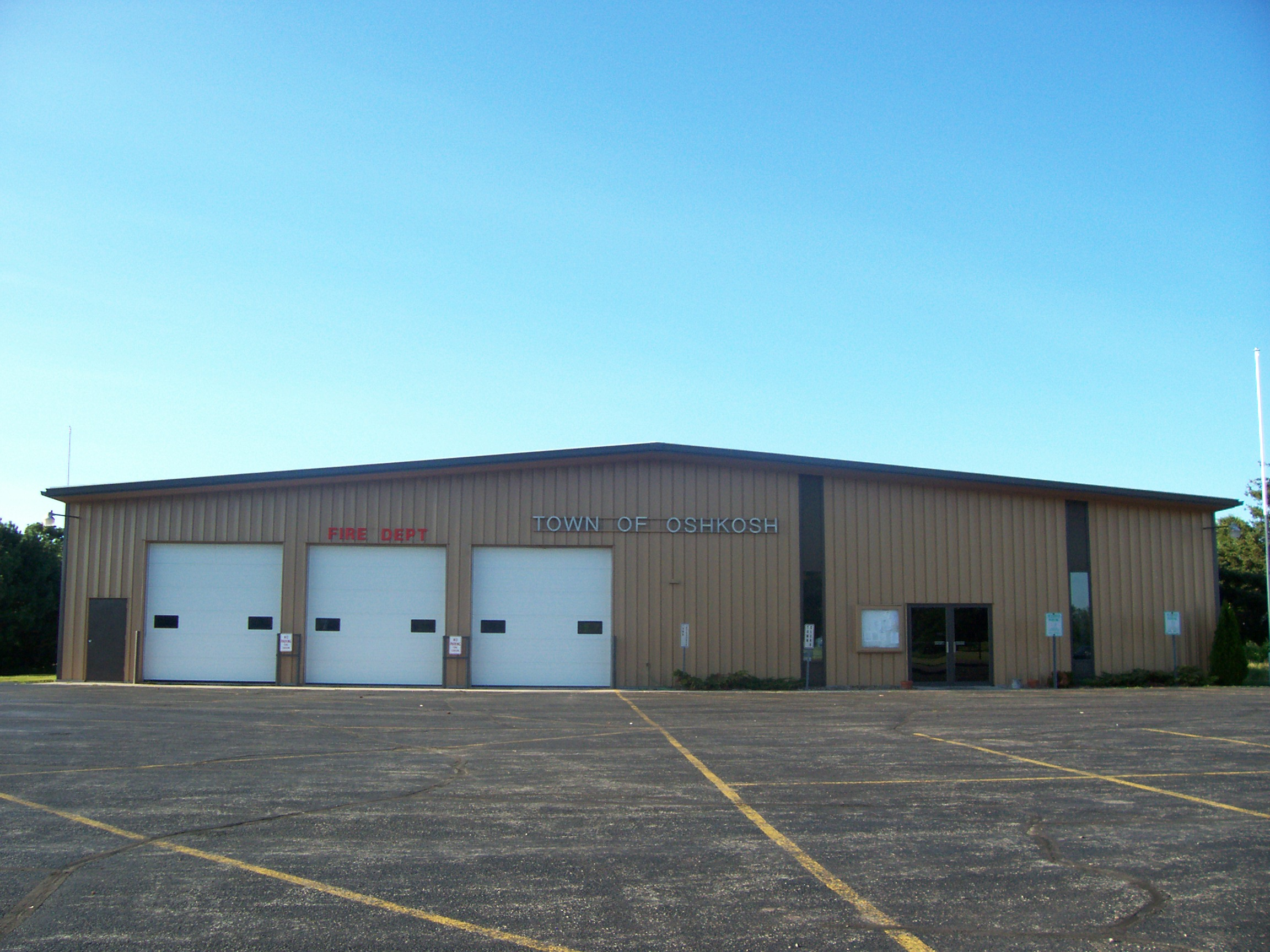
- Oshkosh Town Hall
- Nickname: Sawdust City
- Motto: “On the Water.”
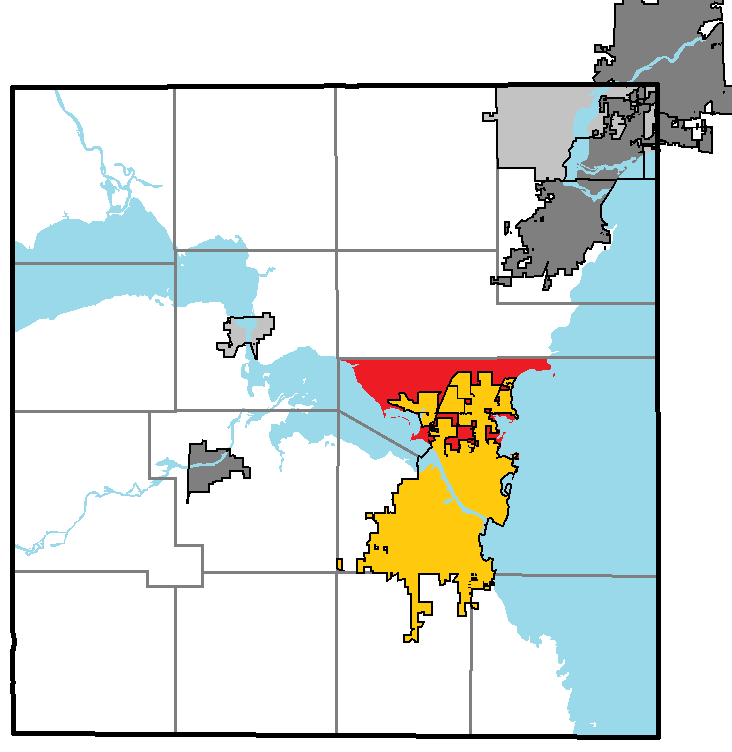
- Location of Town of Oshkosh, within Winnebago County
- Coordinates: 44°4′5″N 88°32′47″W
- Country: United States
- State: Wisconsin
- County: Winnebago
- Settled: 1853

Area
  - Total: 60.1 sq mi (155.7 km^{2})
  - Land: 9.6 sq mi (24.9 km^{2})
  - Water: 50.5 sq mi (130.8 km^{2})
- Elevation: 748 ft (228 m)

Population (2020)
  - Total: 2,439
  - Density: 254/sq mi (98.0/km^{2})
- Time zone: UTC-6 (Central (CST))
  - Summer (DST): UTC-5 (CDT)
- ZIP Code: 54901
- Area code: 920
- FIPS code: 55-60525
- GNIS feature ID: 1583877
- Website: http://www.townofoshkosh.com/

Oshkosh is a town in Winnebago County, Wisconsin, United States. The population was 2,439 at the 2020 census. It is a northern suburb of the larger City of Oshkosh which it is located adjacent to and partially within. The unincorporated communities of Nichols Shore Acres, Plummer Point, Shangri La Point, and Winnebago are located within the town, as is part of the census-designated place of Butte des Morts.

== Geography ==
According to the United States Census Bureau, the town has a total area of 60.1 square miles (155.7 km^{2}), of which 9.6 square miles (24.9 km^{2}) is land and 50.5 square miles (130.8 km^{2}), or 84.02%, is water, consisting of a portion of Lake Winnebago.

== History ==
The town was founded as the Town of Winnebago in 1839. The name was changed to the Town of Oshkosh in 1852, and the City of Oshkosh was created in 1853 from a portion of the town.

== Demographics ==
At the 2000 census, there were 3,234 people, 1,215 households and 868 families residing in the town. The population density was 310.5 per square mile (119.9/km^{2}). There were 1,331 housing units at an average density of 127.8 per square mile (49.4/km^{2}). The racial makeup of the town was 94.53% White, 1.89% Black or African American, 0.49% Native American, 1.67% Asian, 0.59% from other races, and 0.83% from two or more races. 0.93% of the population were Hispanic or Latino of any race.

There were 1,215 households, of which 26.2% had children under the age of 18 living with them, 64.4% were married couples living together, 4.0% had a female householder with no husband present, and 28.5% were non-families. 21.8% of all households were made up of individuals, and 6.0% had someone living alone who was 65 years of age or older. The average household size was 2.46 and the average family size was 2.87.

20.3% of the population were under the age of 18, 7.9% from 18 to 24, 29.8% from 25 to 44, 30.9% from 45 to 64, and 11.1% who were 65 years of age or older. The median age was 40 years. For every 100 females, there were 121.5 males. For every 100 females age 18 and over, there were 125.6 males.

The median household income was $56,274 and the median family income was $60,472. Males had a median income of $38,375 and females $25,718. The per capita income was $25,610. About 3.3% of families and 6.4% of the population were below the poverty line, including 14.7% of those under age 18 and 3.4% of those age 65 or over.
