= Omro (town), Wisconsin =

Omro, Wisconsin
- Town
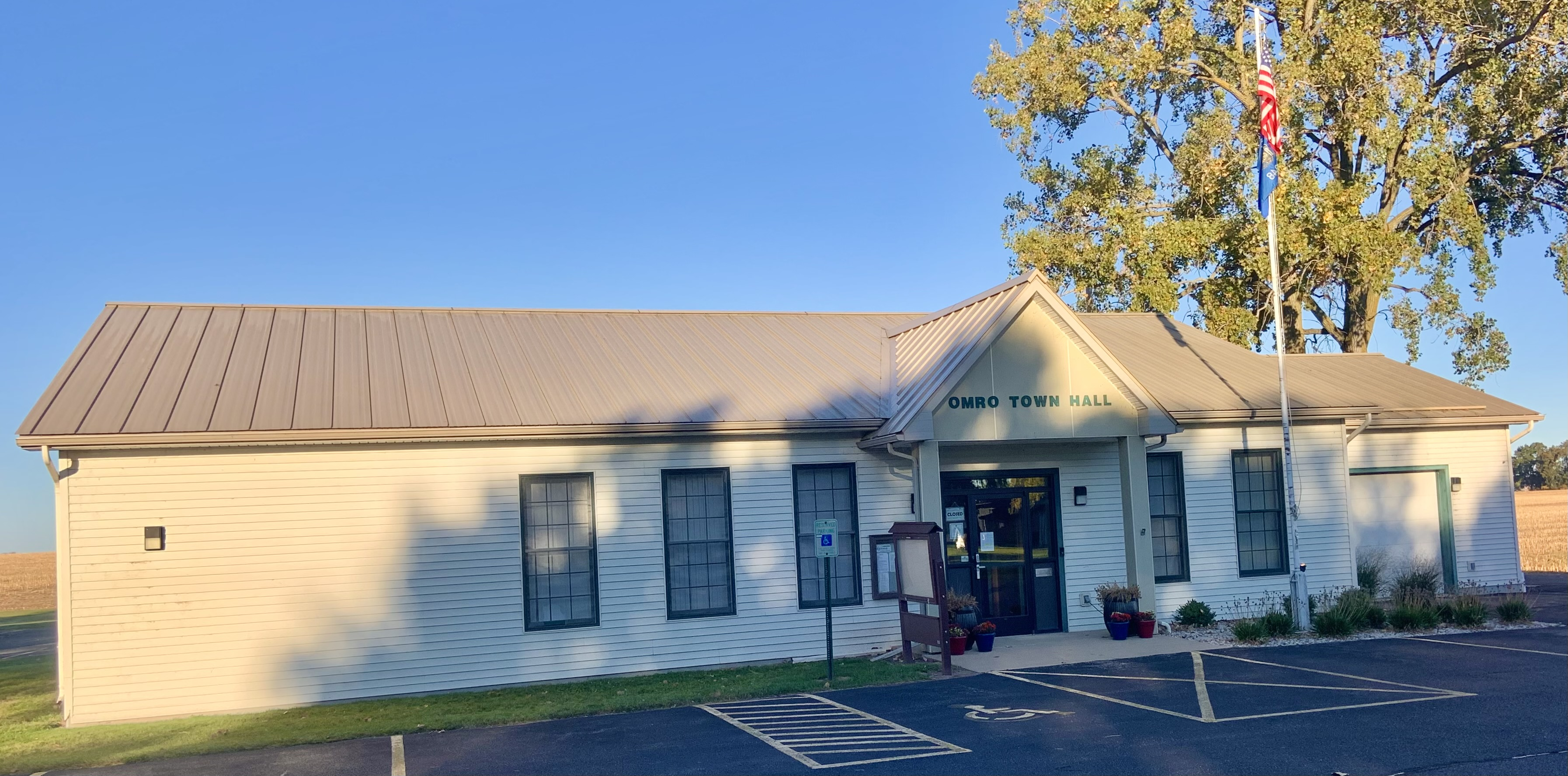
- Town hall

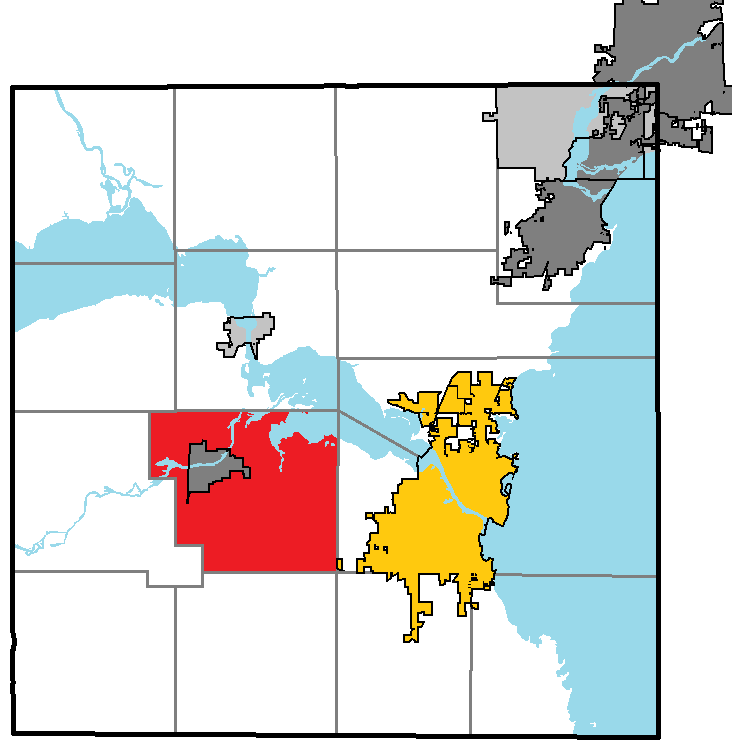
- Location of Omro (town), within Winnebago County
- Coordinates: 44°2′8″N 88°42′47″W
- Country: United States
- State: Wisconsin
- County: Winnebago

Area
  - Total: 35.4 sq mi (91.8 km^{2})
  - Land: 32.4 sq mi (83.8 km^{2})
  - Water: 3.1 sq mi (8.0 km^{2})
- Elevation: 758 ft (231 m)

Population (2020)
  - Total: 2,293
  - Density: 70.9/sq mi (27.4/km^{2})
- Time zone: UTC-6 (Central (CST))
  - Summer (DST): UTC-5 (CDT)
- Area code: 920
- FIPS code: 55-59900
- GNIS feature ID: 1583860
- Website: www.townofomro.gov

Omro is a town in Winnebago County, Wisconsin, United States. The population was 2,293 at the 2020 census. The City of Omro and the unincorporated communities of Harbor Springs, Reighmoor, Rivermoor, and Zion are located in the town.

== Geography ==
According to the United States Census Bureau, the town has a total area of 35.4 square miles (91.8 km^{2}), of which 32.4 square miles (83.8 km^{2}) is land and 3.1 square miles (8.0 km^{2}), or 8.67%, is water.

== Demographics ==
As of the census of 2000, there were 1,875 people, 706 households, and 556 families residing in the town. The population density was 57.0 people per square mile (22.0/km^{2}). There were 776 housing units at an average density of 23.6 per square mile (9.1/km^{2}). The racial makeup of the town was 98.35% White, 0.16% Black or African American, 0.16% Native American, 0.53% Asian, 0.27% from other races, and 0.53% from two or more races. 0.75% of the population were Hispanic or Latino of any race.

There were 706 households, out of which 33.3% had children under the age of 18 living with them, 70.0% were married couples living together, 4.7% had a female householder with no husband present, and 21.2% were non-families. 18.6% of all households were made up of individuals, and 7.1% had someone living alone who was 65 years of age or older. The average household size was 2.66 and the average family size was 3.01.

In the town, the population was spread out, with 26.7% under the age of 18, 5.5% from 18 to 24, 29.5% from 25 to 44, 27.0% from 45 to 64, and 11.4% who were 65 years of age or older. The median age was 39 years. For every 100 females, there were 106.7 males. For every 100 females age 18 and over, there were 105.5 males.

The median income for a household in the town was $43,750, and the median income for a family was $48,988. Males had a median income of $35,083 versus $25,625 for females. The per capita income for the town was $19,702. About 4.4% of families and 5.7% of the population were below the poverty line, including 5.6% of those under age 18 and 16.2% of those age 65 or over.
