= Neenah (town), Wisconsin =

Neenah, Wisconsin
- Town
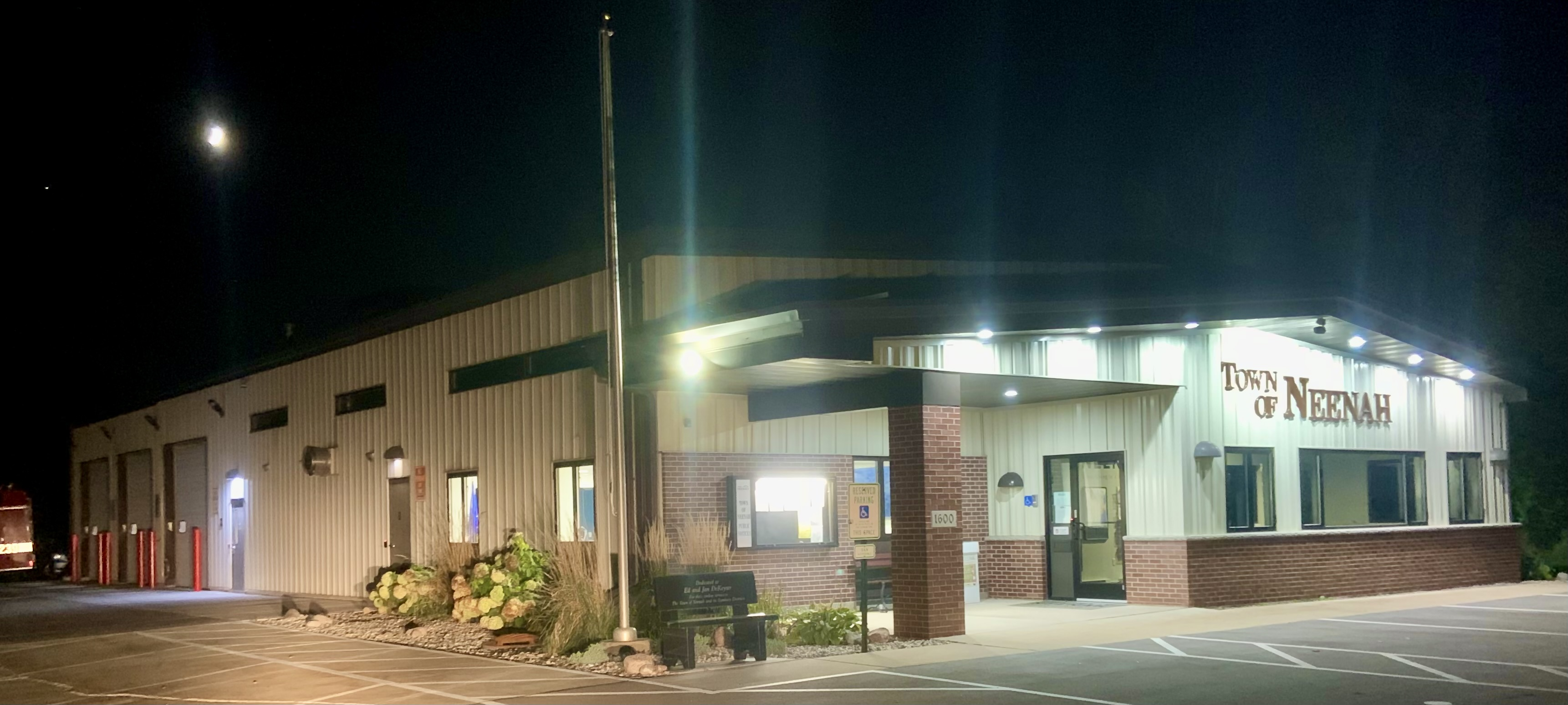
- Town hall

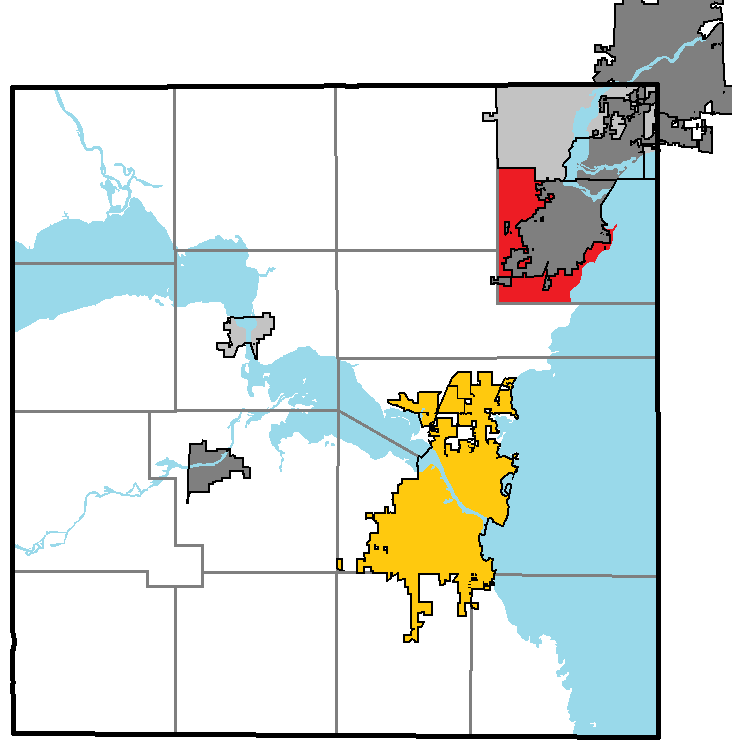
- Location of Neenah (town), within Winnebago County
- Coordinates: 44°10′25″N 88°29′19″W
- Country: United States
- State: Wisconsin
- County: Winnebago

Area
  - Total: 17.8 sq mi (46.2 km^{2})
  - Land: 8.0 sq mi (20.6 km^{2})
  - Water: 9.9 sq mi (25.7 km^{2})
- Elevation: 761 ft (232 m)

Population (2020)
  - Total: 3,702
  - Density: 465/sq mi (180/km^{2})
- Time zone: UTC-6 (Central (CST))
  - Summer (DST): UTC-5 (CDT)
- Area code: 920
- FIPS code: 55-55775
- GNIS feature ID: 1583785
- Website: www.townofneenah.com

Neenah is a town in Winnebago County, Wisconsin, United States. The population was 3,702 at the 2020 census. The City of Neenah is adjacent to the town, but is politically independent. The unincorporated communities of Adella Beach, Ricker Bay, Snells, and Sunrise Bay are located in the town.

== History ==
The original land area of the town was reduced when the Town of Menasha was formed long ago. Annexations from the city of Neenah took place over the decades that followed. After having a portion of land set to be the future site of Neenah High School annexed by the village of Fox Crossing in early 2020, town leaders asked the city of Neenah to annex high-value lands, including a power plant, in order to keep some of the revenue flowing to the town and to avoid aggressive annexation by Fox Crossing.

== Geography ==
According to the United States Census Bureau, the town has a total area of 17.8 square miles (46.2 km^{2}), of which 8.0 square miles (20.6 km^{2}) is land and 9.9 square miles (25.7 km^{2}), or 55.51%, is water, consisting of a portion of Lake Winnebago.

== Demographics ==
As of the census of 2000, there were 2,657 people, 976 households, and 797 families residing in the town. The population density was 295.0 people per square mile (113.9/km^{2}). There were 1,010 housing units at an average density of 112.1 per square mile (43.3/km^{2}). The racial makeup of the town was 98.19% White, 0.04% Black or African American, 0.30% Native American, 0.98% Asian, 0.23% from other races, and 0.26% from two or more races. 0.75% of the population were Hispanic or Latino of any race.

There were 976 households, out of which 35.3% had children under the age of 18 living with them, 74.5% were married couples living together, 5.4% had a female householder with no husband present, and 18.3% were non-families. 15.7% of all households were made up of individuals, and 4.7% had someone living alone who was 65 years of age or older. The average household size was 2.72 and the average family size was 3.04.

In the town, the population was spread out, with 26.5% under the age of 18, 5.1% from 18 to 24, 27.7% from 25 to 44, 29.8% from 45 to 64, and 10.9% who were 65 years of age or older. The median age was 41 years. For every 100 females, there were 98.1 males. For every 100 females age 18 and over, there were 102.3 males.

The median income for a household in the town was $57,083, and the median income for a family was $61,865. Males had a median income of $42,404 versus $30,365 for females. The per capita income for the town was $30,260. About 0.7% of families and 1.5% of the population were below the poverty line, including 1.1% of those under age 18 and 4.0% of those age 65 or over.

== Public safety ==
The Town of Neenah operates a fire department with a fleet of two engines, one tender, and a UTV for off-road firefighting and medical emergencies. The town is served by the Winnebago County Sheriff's Office, which provides for all law enforcement needs in the town. It contracts with Gold Cross Ambulance Service for ambulance coverage.
