= Wolf River, Winnebago County, Wisconsin =

Wolf River, Wisconsin
- Town
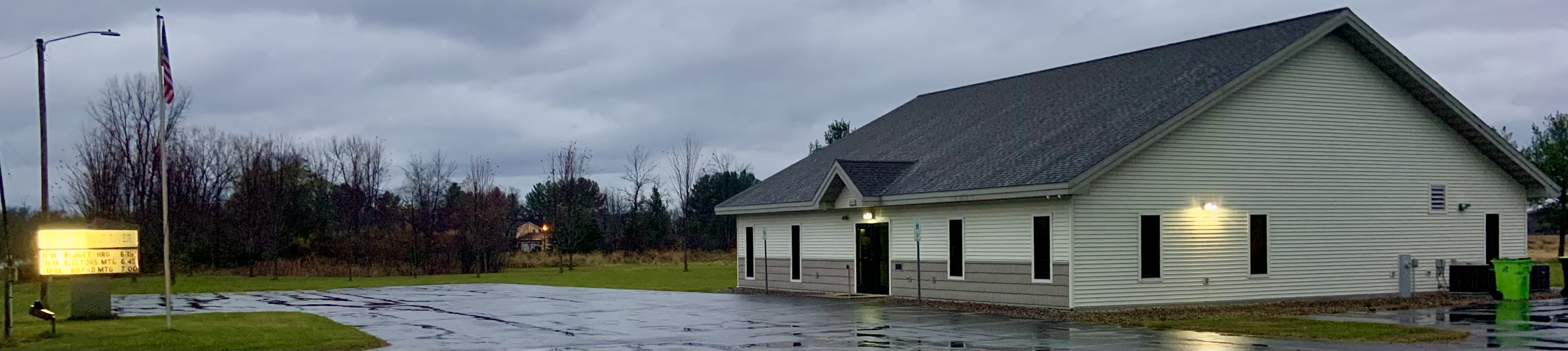
- Town hall
- Motto: A River Flows Through
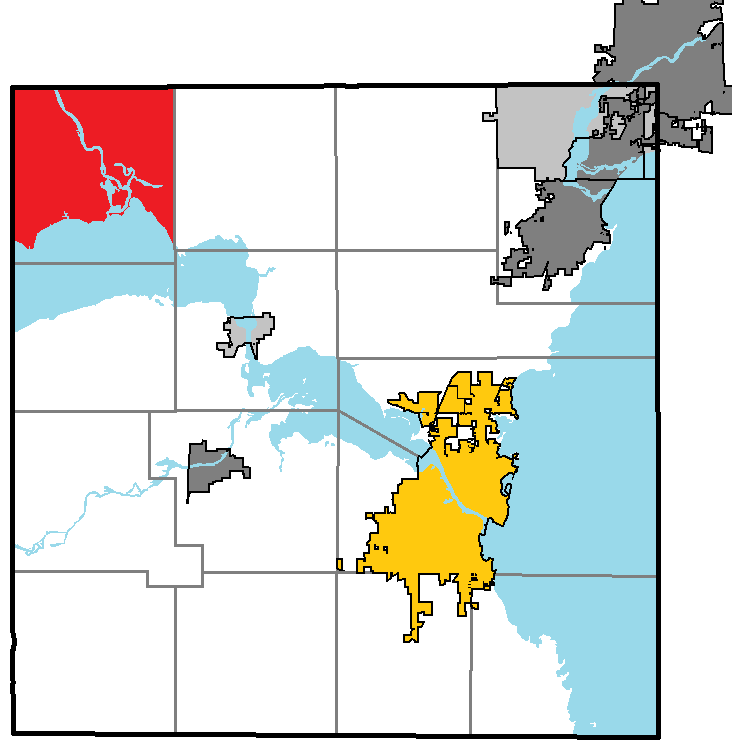
- Location of Wolf River, within Winnebago County, Wisconsin
- Coordinates: 44°11′54″N 88°49′7″W
- Country: United States
- State: Wisconsin
- County: Winnebago

Area
  - Total: 36.1 sq mi (93.4 km^{2})
  - Land: 28.8 sq mi (74.7 km^{2})
  - Water: 7.2 sq mi (18.7 km^{2})
- Elevation: 751 ft (229 m)

Population (2020)
  - Total: 1,203
  - Density: 41.7/sq mi (16.1/km^{2})
- Time zone: UTC-6 (Central (CST))
  - Summer (DST): UTC-5 (CDT)
- Area code: 920
- FIPS code: 55-88475
- GNIS feature ID: 1584469
- Website: www.townofwolfriver.com

Wolf River is a town in Winnebago County, Wisconsin, United States. The population was 1,203 at the 2020 census. The unincorporated communities of Orihula and Zittau are located in the town. The unincorporated community of Metz is also located partially in the town.

== Geography ==
According to the United States Census Bureau, the town has a total area of 36.1 square miles (93.4 km^{2}), of which 28.8 square miles (74.7 km^{2}) is land and 7.2 square miles (18.7 km^{2}), or 20.07%, is water.

== Demographics ==
As of the census of 2000, there were 1,223 people, 515 households, and 372 families residing in the town. The population density was 41.7 people per square mile (16.1/km^{2}). There were 807 housing units at an average density of 27.5 per square mile (10.6/km^{2}). The racial makeup of the town was 97.71% White, 0.08% African American, 0.41% Native American, 0.08% Asian, 0.08% Pacific Islander, 0.74% from other races, and 0.90% from two or more races. Hispanic or Latino of any race were 1.23% of the population.

There were 515 households, out of which 23.3% had children under the age of 18 living with them, 64.9% were married couples living together, 2.3% had a female householder with no husband present, and 27.6% were non-families. 22.7% of all households were made up of individuals, and 9.1% had someone living alone who was 65 years of age or older. The average household size was 2.37 and the average family size was 2.79.

In the town, the population was spread out, with 20.0% under the age of 18, 5.0% from 18 to 24, 25.4% from 25 to 44, 33.0% from 45 to 64, and 16.6% who were 65 years of age or older. The median age was 45 years. For every 100 females, there were 112.3 males. For every 100 females age 18 and over, there were 109.9 males.

The median income for a household in the town was $44,922, and the median income for a family was $54,313. Males had a median income of $37,391 versus $23,583 for females. The per capita income for the town was $21,594. About 4.8% of families and 6.3% of the population were below the poverty line, including 6.9% of those under age 18 and 8.1% of those age 65 or over.
