= Winneconne (town), Wisconsin =

Winneconne, Wisconsin
- Town
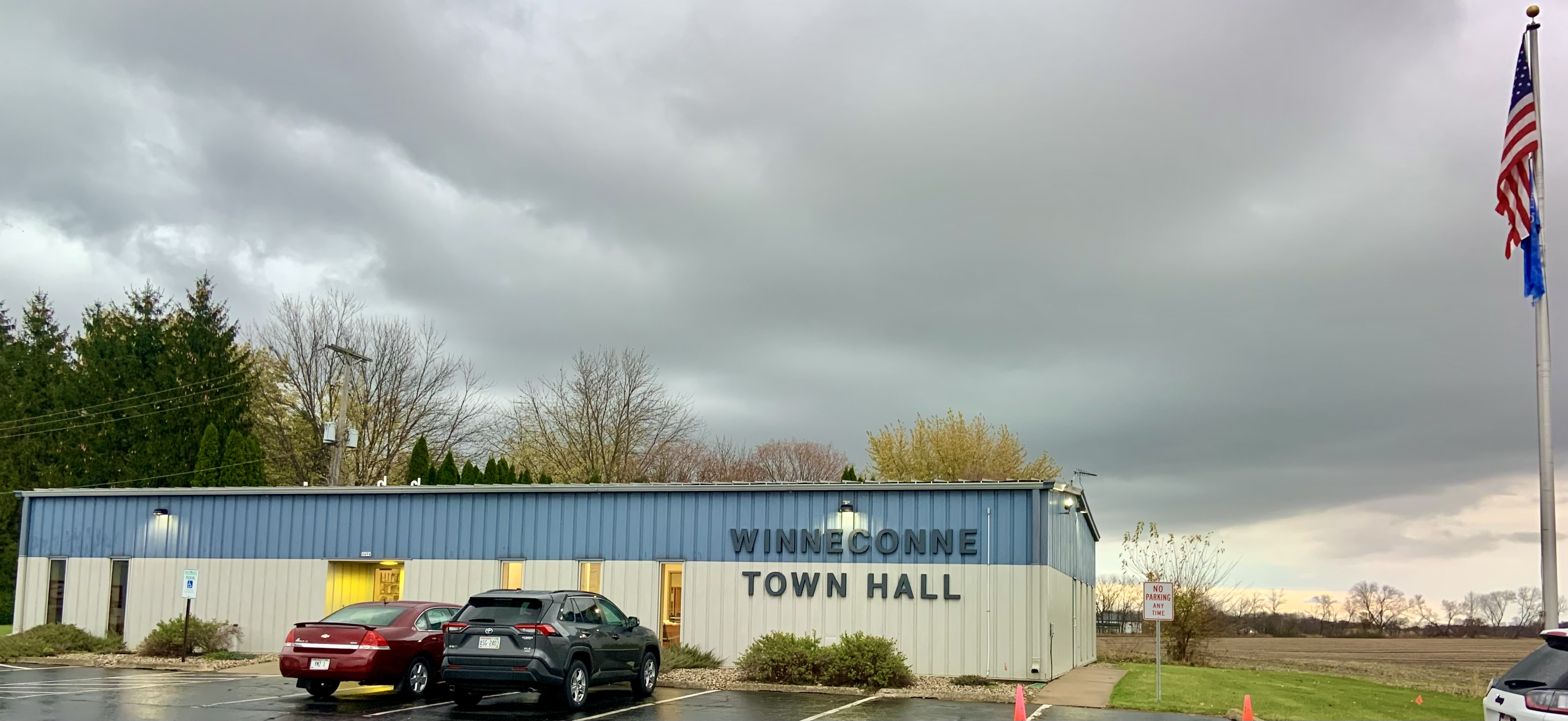
- Town hall

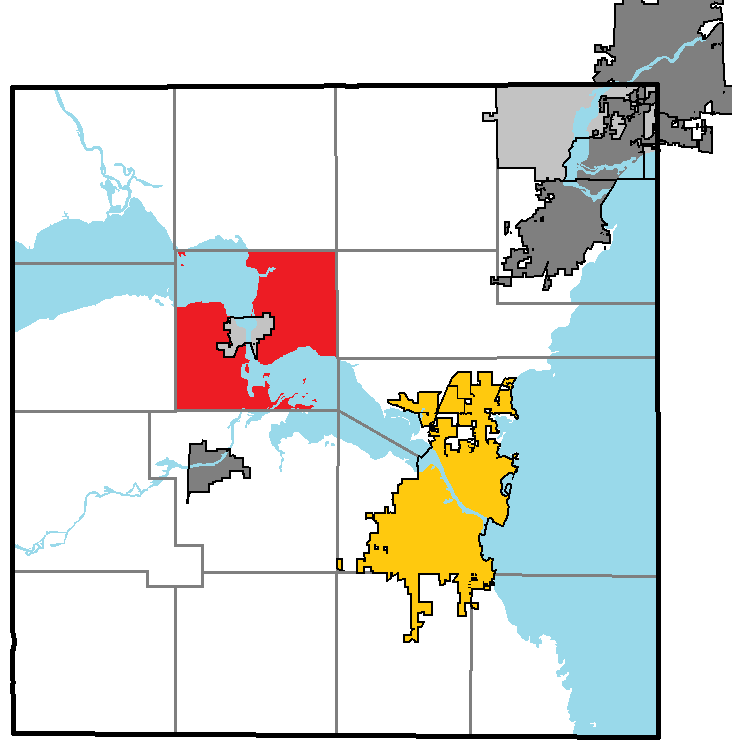
- Location within Winnebago County

- Location within the state of Wisconsin
- Coordinates: 44°6′40″N 88°42′54″W
- Country: United States
- State: Wisconsin
- County: Winnebago

Area
  - Total: 33.7 sq mi (87.2 km^{2})
  - Land: 21.5 sq mi (55.8 km^{2})
  - Water: 12.1 sq mi (31.4 km^{2})

Population (2020)
  - Total: 2,590
  - Density: 120/sq mi (46.4/km^{2})
- Time zone: UTC-6 (Central (CST))
  - Summer (DST): UTC-5 (CDT)
- ZIP codes: 54986
- Area code: 920
- FIPS code: 55-87925
- Website: townofwinneconne.gov

Winneconne is a town in Winnebago County, Wisconsin, United States. The population was 2,590 at the 2020 census. The Village of Winneconne is located within the town, on both sides of the Wolf River. The unincorporated community of Butte des Morts, named for a French and Native American trading war, is also located in the town. The town's water resources of rivers and lakes makes it a center of hunting and fishing, including winter ice fishing.

== History ==
The name is a word derived from the Menominee language meaning "place of skulls". It refers to a battle site of the French colonial era, in which the Sauk and Fox fought against the French, Menominee and Chippewa for control over the regional fur trade and other resources. It also refers to a nearby prehistoric indigenous burial mound, the namesake for Lake Butte des Morts.

== Geography ==
According to the United States Census Bureau, the town has a total area of 33.7 square miles (87.2 km^{2}), of which 21.5 square miles (55.8 km^{2}) is land and 12.1 square miles (31.4 km^{2}), or 36.02%, is water. This is the area of the Wolf Chain, a series of connected lakes along the river.

== Demographics ==
As of the census of 2000, there were 2,145 people, 838 households, and 666 families residing in the town. The population density was 97.6 people per square mile (37.7/km^{2}). There were 1,020 housing units at an average density of 46.4 per square mile (17.9/km^{2}). The racial makeup of the town was 99.44% White, 0.23% Native American, 0.19% Asian, and 0.14% from two or more races. 0.19% of the population were Hispanic or Latino of any race.

There were 838 households, out of which 30.4% had children under the age of 18 living with them, 71.5% were married couples living together, 4.3% had a female householder with no husband present, and 20.5% were non-families. 16.1% of all households were made up of individuals, and 6.7% had someone living alone who was 65 years of age or older. The average household size was 2.56 and the average family size was 2.87.

In the town, the population was spread out, with 23.2% under the age of 18, 5.4% from 18 to 24, 27.1% from 25 to 44, 30.3% from 45 to 64, and 14.1% who were 65 years of age or older. The median age was 42 years. For every 100 females, there were 103.1 males. For every 100 females age 18 and over, there were 102.6 males.

The median income for a household in the town was $60,385, and the median income for a family was $65,893. Males had a median income of $42,566 versus $27,692 for females. The per capita income for the town was $27,274. About 0.3% of families and 2.2% of the population were below the poverty line, including 1.3% of those under age 18 and 8.8% of those age 65 or over.

== 20th-century Secession ==
In 1967, the town name was inadvertently left off the official Wisconsin road map. When residents noticed, they formed a secret committee and formulated a plan to secede from Wisconsin, set up toll gates on local roads and begin annexation of nearby communities (starting with the city of Oshkosh) to form a Sovereign State of Winneconne.

As an alternative plan, they intended to seek annexation by another state, preferably one with better weather. The deadline for secession was July 21, 1967. A proclamation was issued, naming village president, "James Coughlin to be president of the new state of Winneconne; Vera Kitchen to be prime minister and custodian of Vera's Kitchen Cabinet." Wisconsin Governor Warren Knowles entered into negotiations with the former village officials; as a result, Winneconne rejoined the State of Wisconsin at 12:01 AM on July 22, 1967. An annual Sovereign State Days celebration commemorates the event.
