= Lake Poygan =

Lake in Wisconsin, United States

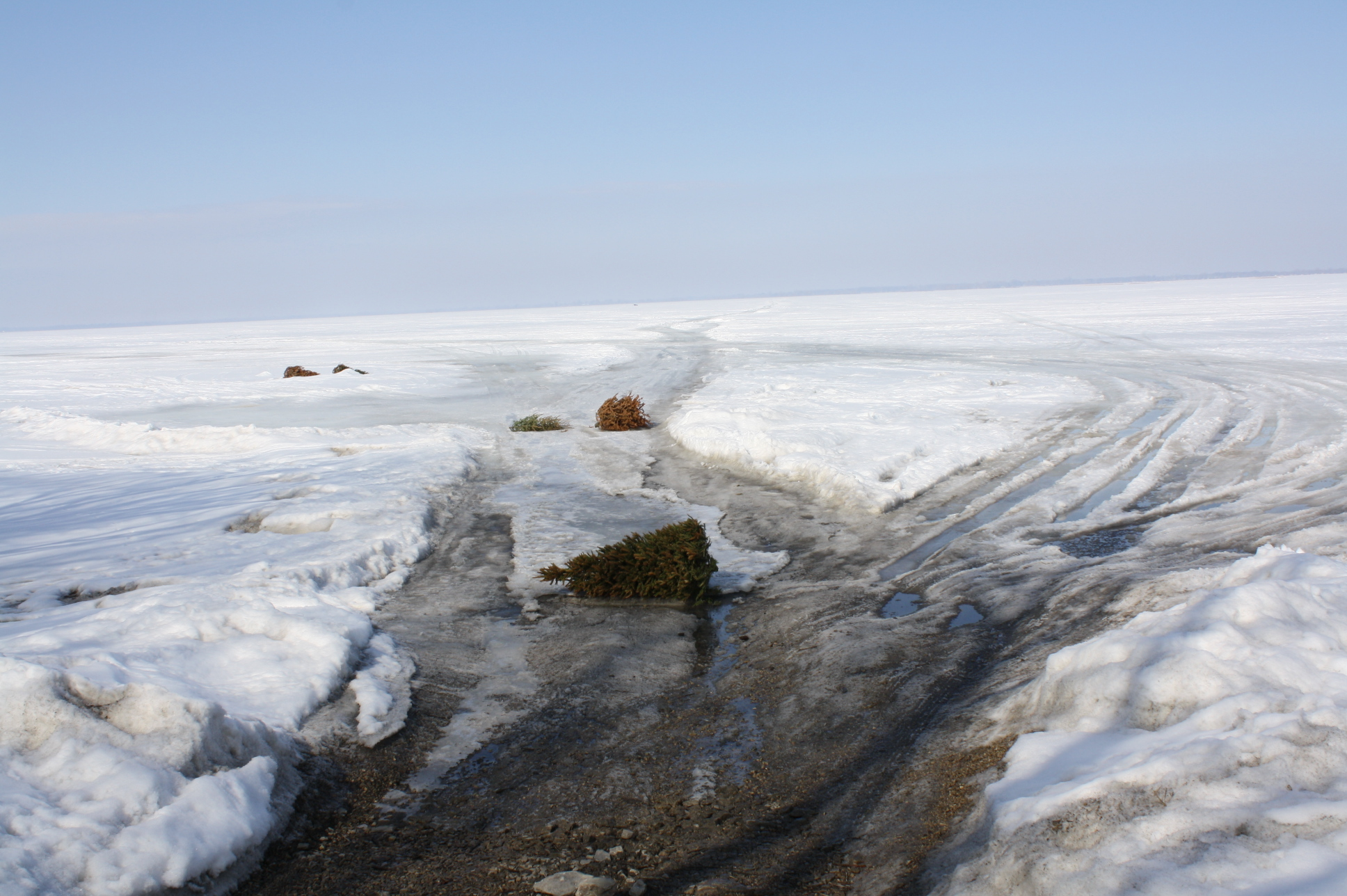
- Ice road onto Lake Poygan

- Location within Wisconsin
- Location: Winnebago / Waushara counties, Wisconsin, US
- Coordinates: 44°09′00″N 88°45′01″W
- Primary inflows: Wolf River
- Primary outflows: Wolf River
- Basin countries: United States
- Surface area: 14,024 acres (5,675 ha)
- Average depth: 6 ft (1.8 m)
- Max. depth: 11 ft (3.4 m)

Lake Poygan, located in the U.S. state of Wisconsin near the village of Winneconne, is an expansive widening of the Wolf River totaling over 14,000 acres (57 km^{2}). Lake Poygan is part of the Winnebago Pool or Wolf Chain, a series of interconnected lakes fed by both the Fox and Wolf rivers. The eastern third of the lake is often referred to as Lake Winneconne. In the Menominee language it is called Pawāhekaneh, "Wild Rice Threshing Lake", referring to the traditional importance of wild rice cultivation to the local economy.

Like the other lakes of the Winnebago Pool, the lake is quite shallow, with an average depth of 6 feet (1.8 m) and a maximum depth of approximately 11 feet (3.4 m). Via the Wolf River, boaters can find navigable passage to Lake Butte des Morts and Lake Winnebago downstream (near Oshkosh), and upstream to Partridge Lake and Partridge Crop Lake (near Fremont and New London).

== Recreation ==
A variety of fish species can be found in the lake, including walleye, muskellunge, white bass, largemouth bass, smallmouth bass, carp, flathead catfish, channel catfish, northern pike, crappie, yellow perch, bluegill and sturgeon. Many anglers consider Lake Poygan to be one of the most productive fisheries on the entire Winnebago Pool.
