= Winnebago Pool =

Lakes in Wisconsin, United States

Coordinates: 44°00′N 88°35′W

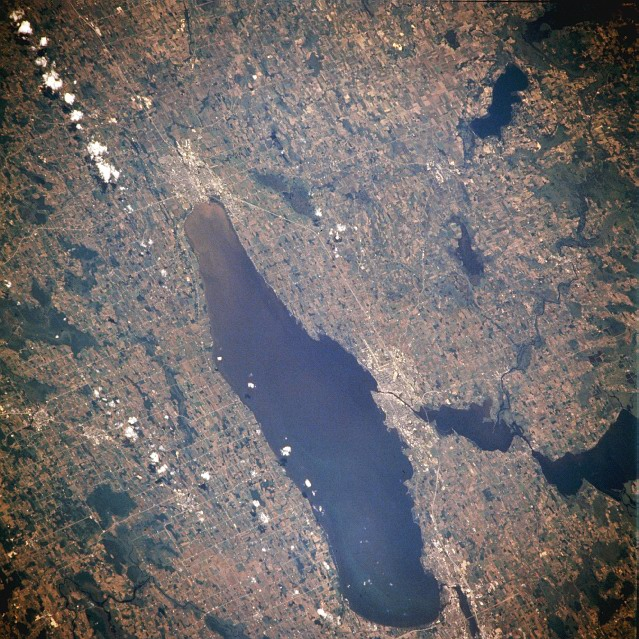
Much of the Winnebago Pool from space, July 1996. Lake Winnebago is in the center, with Big Lake Butte des Morts just to the right of the center of the lake, and Lake Winneconne and Lake Poygan proceeding thence toward the right side of the image. Lake Winnebago runs along a roughly north-south line, with the south end of the lake being toward the top of this image.

The Winnebago Pool is a collective name for a group of interconnected lakes in eastern Wisconsin. The terminal point of this watershed is Lake Winnebago itself, which has a surface elevation of 746 feet. Besides Lake Winnebago, the Winnebago Pool includes Big Lake Butte des Morts, Lake Poygan and Lake Winneconne. After the waters reach Lake Winnebago, they exit through the Lower Fox River and over the next 39 miles, the river drops over 150 feet to reach the lower water level of Green Bay.

The lakes of the Winnebago pool combine to encompass over 166,000 acres (672 km^{2}) and account for nearly 17% of the total surface water area in Wisconsin (not counting the Great Lakes). The primary feed waters of the Winnebago Pool are the Wolf River, Upper Fox River and Fond du Lac River. Lakes Winnebago and Big Lake Butte des Morts (along with Little Lake Butte des Morts to the northeast) served as part of the Fox-Wisconsin Waterway. The Butte des Morts region is part of the Winnebago Pool.
