= Winneconne, Wisconsin =

- Village
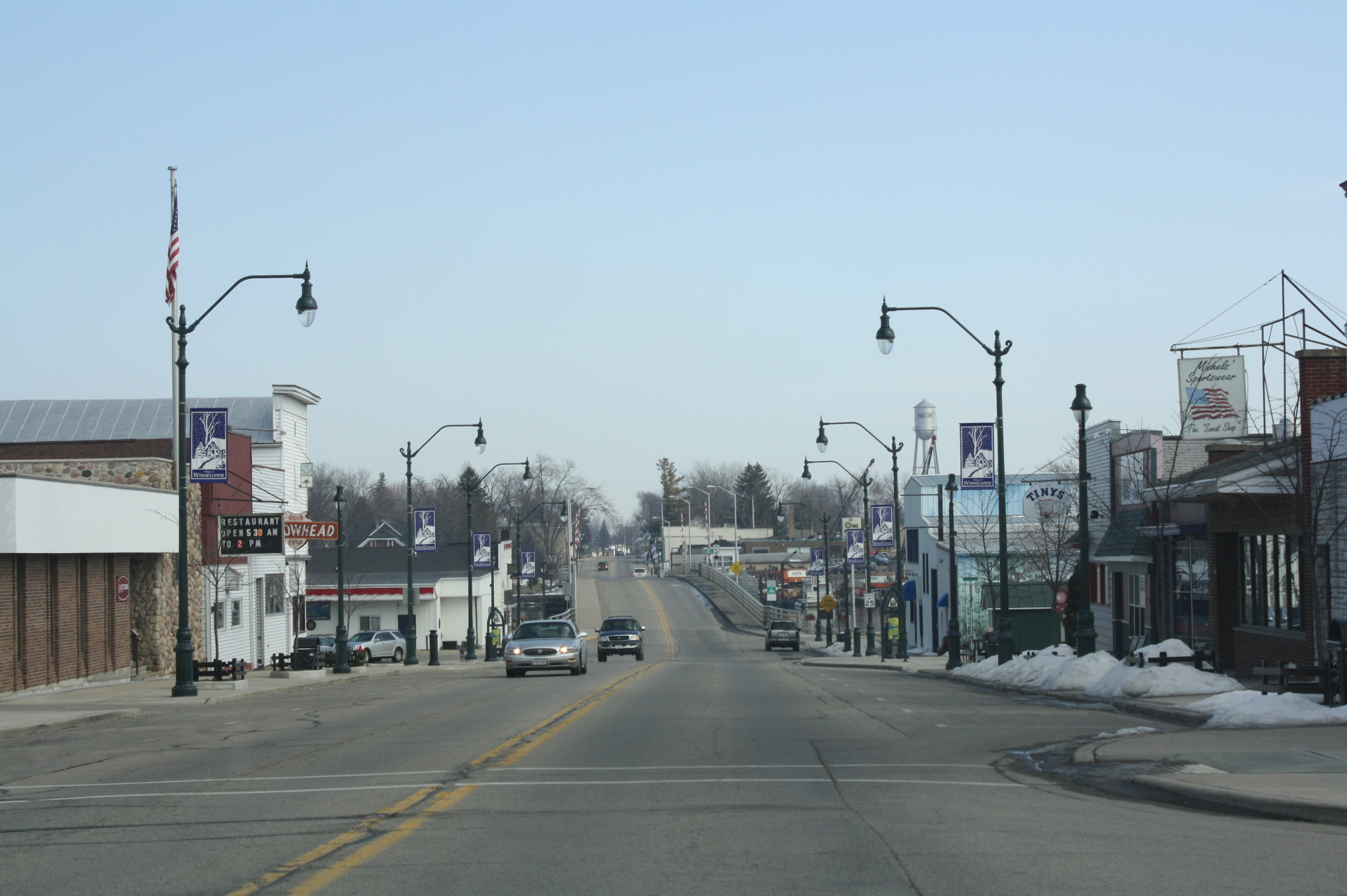
- Downtown Winneconne

- Location of Winneconne in Winnebago County, Wisconsin.
- Coordinates: 44°6′12″N 88°41′22″W
- Country: United States
- State: Wisconsin
- County: Winnebago

Government

Area
  - Total: 1.92 sq mi (4.97 km^{2})
  - Land: 1.48 sq mi (3.84 km^{2})
  - Water: 0.44 sq mi (1.13 km^{2})
- Elevation: 748 ft (228 m)

Population (2020)
  - Total: 2,544
  - Density: 1,720/sq mi (662/km^{2})
- Time zone: UTC-6 (Central (CST))
  - Summer (DST): UTC-5 (CDT)
- Area code: 920
- FIPS code: 55-87925
- GNIS feature ID: 1576880
- Website: Official website

Winneconne is a village in Winnebago County, Wisconsin, United States. The population was 2,544 at the time of the 2020 census. The village is located within the Town of Winneconne. Developed along the Wolf River, the community is in the middle of the Wolf Chain of lakes, including Poygan, Winneconne, and Butte des Morts. It is host to numerous bass fishing tournaments.

== History ==
This area was originally occupied by succeeding cultures of indigenous peoples. The historic Menominee people were settled in the area at the time of European encounter. French fur traders from Quebec were among the first to interact with them, followed by Catholic Jesuit missionaries. The area was ruled by Great Britain as part of the Province of Quebec and then acquired by the United States.

Winneconne's European-American settlement began in the mid-19th century with Yankees who migrated from New England and the Northern Tier, added to by waves of immigrants: Irish, Germans, and Norwegians. Originally, Winneconne had many different spellings: Winneconnah, Winnekonah, Wau-nau-ko, and Winnikning, which were transliterations from the Menominee and other Indian names for the site. The Indian meanings of these names ranged from "land of dirty water" to "land of skull and bones", referring to a prehistoric burial mound known as Butte des Morts by the French. In 1851 the recently constituted village board officially settled the spelling of the name as Winneconne.

Joseph Edwards (1809–1902) was the first postmaster. He was a migrant from Hopewell, Bedford County, Pennsylvania via 15 years farming in Richland County, Ohio. He first settled with his family in Winneconne in 1849, building the first frame house in the village. After living here a few years, he moved to Dayton, Waupaca County, Wisconsin for more farming. He and his wife Mary (Wright) Edwards returned to this village in 1886. She died in 1895; and four of their nine children survived him: Mrs. D.C. Reed was still living in the village; son Oscar A. Edwards lived in Rhinelander, and two married daughters lived in Tacoma, Washington.

After the Treaty of Poygan in 1852, by which the Menominee ceded more land in this area to the United States, Winneconne expanded its land west of the Wolf River. Chief Oshkosh negotiated with the President to keep other lands in this area, as more than 2500 of his people refused to move to Minnesota, as was desired by the federal government. The Menominee Indian Tribe of Wisconsin is federally recognized.

Because of the expansion of the village, people needed to cross the river more frequently. Initially the Menominee would transport people and goods by canoe. In 1853, settler J.D. Rush built a float bridge, and set up toll stations to recover his costs. Since then a total of four bridges have been built, including the current one.

In Winneconne's early years, mills were built along the river as the first industries, to process lumber, grain, and operate tanneries. Commercial fishing was also a thriving business. The many shipyards built and repaired fleets then made up primarily of wooden boats and ships.

With its many rivers and lakes, Winneconne has been known as a "hunting and fishing paradise." Some resort housing has been built in the area.

Improvements continue in the area. The Wolf River Bridge, carrying WIS 116, was built in 1934 during the Great Depression with support from the federal government, under President Franklin D. Roosevelt's WPA projects for investment in infrastructure. This non-redundant bascule bridge is now functionally obsolete because of its narrow deck width and aging materials. As it is very important to the Main Street of the village, and connections to other cities in the region, the state has approved a new bridge to carry WIS 116. A new bridge will also have fishing platforms, as does the current one.

=== Secession ===
In 1967, as a result of the town name being inadvertently left off the official Wisconsin road map, a secret committee led by Vera Wentzel-Kitchen of the Arrowhead Restaurant formulated a plan to secede from Wisconsin, set up toll gates on local roads, and begin annexation of nearby communities, starting with the city of Oshkosh, to form a Sovereign State of Winneconne. As an alternative plan, they sought annexation by another state, preferably one with better weather. The deadline for secession was July 21, 1967. A proclamation was issued, naming village president "James Coughlin to be president of the new state of Winneconne; Vera Kitchen to be prime minister and custodian of Vera’s Kitchen Cabinet". The secession was not recognized by any formal government and was merely a gesture indicative of the village's displeasure with state officials. Wisconsin Governor Warren P. Knowles met with village officials; as a result, Winneconne reconciled with the state of Wisconsin on July 22, 1967. An annual Sovereign State Days celebration commemorates the event, and a logo showing poison ivy, a skunk, a sheepshead, and a dodo bird is displayed throughout the town.

== Geography ==
Winneconne is located at 44°6'39" North, 88°42'51" West (44.111029, -88.714311).

According to the United States Census Bureau, the village has a total area of 1.95 square miles (5.05 km^{2}), of which 1.53 square miles (3.96 km^{2}) is land and 0.42 square miles (1.09 km^{2}) is water.

The city was built along the banks of the Wolf Chain, which includes Lake Poygan, Lake Winneconne, and Lake Butte des Morts. Many bass fishing tournaments are based in Winneconne due to its central location on the chain.

== Demographics ==
Historical population
Census	Pop.	Note	%±
1870	1,159		—
1880	978		−15.6%
1890	1,086		11.0%
1900	1,042		−4.1%
1910	940		−9.8%
1920	745		−20.7%
1930	821		10.2%
1940	931		13.4%
1950	1,078		15.8%
1960	1,273		18.1%
1970	1,611		26.6%
1980	1,935		20.1%
1990	2,059		6.4%
2000	2,401		16.6%
2010	2,383		−0.7%
2020	2,544		6.8%
U.S. Decennial Census

=== 2010 census ===
As of the census of 2010, there were 2,383 people, 1,027 households, and 678 families residing in the village. The population density was 1,557.5 inhabitants per square mile (601.4/km^{2}). There were 1,198 housing units at an average density of 783.0 per square mile (302.3/km^{2}). The racial makeup of the village was 97.5% White, 0.2% African American, 0.4% Native American, 0.3% Asian, 0.8% from other races, and 0.8% from two or more races. Hispanic or Latino of any race were 1.3% of the population.

There were 1,027 households, of which 29.4% had children under the age of 18 living with them, 54.3% were married couples living together, 7.5% had a female householder with no husband present, 4.2% had a male householder with no wife present, and 34.0% were non-families. 28.7% of all households were made up of individuals, and 12.4% had someone living alone who was 65 years of age or older. The average household size was 2.32 and the average family size was 2.87.

The median age in the village was 43.7 years. 22.6% of residents were under the age of 18; 7% were between the ages of 18 and 24; 22.5% were from 25 to 44; 31.1% were from 45 to 64; and 16.7% were 65 years of age or older. The gender makeup of the village was 49.1% male and 50.9% female.

=== 2000 census ===
As of the census of 2000, there were 2,401 people, 945 households, and 687 families residing in the village. The population density was 1,503.4 people per square mile (579.4/km^{2}). There were 1,060 housing units at an average density of 663.7 per square mile (255.8/km^{2}). The racial makeup of the village was 98.75% White, 0.00% Black or African American, 0.50% Native American, 0.12% Asian, 0.00% Pacific Islander, 0.08% from other races, and 0.54% from two or more races. 0.62% of the population were Hispanic or Latino of any race.

There were 945 households, out of which 36.0% had children under the age of 18 living with them, 59.4% were married couples living together, 9.2% had a female householder with no husband present, and 27.2% were non-families. 23.4% of all households were made up of individuals, and 11.5% had someone living alone who was 65 years of age or older. The average household size was 2.53 and the average family size was 3.01.

In the village, the population was spread out, with 27.1% under the age of 18, 6.5% from 18 to 24, 27.9% from 25 to 44, 23.5% from 45 to 64, and 15.0% who were 65 years of age or older. The median age was 39 years. For every 100 females, there were 97.6 males. For every 100 females age 18 and over, there were 91.6 males.

The median income for a household in the village was $44,886, and the median income for a family was $53,477. Males had a median income of $41,047 versus $24,688 for females. The per capita income for the village was $20,316. 4.7% of the population and 3.4% of families were below the poverty line. 3.6% of those under the age of 18 and 9.8% of those 65 and older were living below the poverty line.

== Winneconne Public Library ==
The Winneconne Public Library, located at 31 South 2nd Street in the heart of the village, offers Internet access, adult book discussion groups, children's programs, lending books and other media. The library has 35,000 holdings, approximately 30,000 of which are books and the balance consisting of video, audio, and other materials in electronic format. The library hosts the Winneconne Vital Records Database, where genealogists can search for birth, marriage and death records from Winneconne newspapers. The Winneconne Library belongs to the Winnefox Library System, which serves a population of over 300,000 from Fond du Lac, Green Lake, Marquette, Waushara, and Winnebago counties.

== Images ==
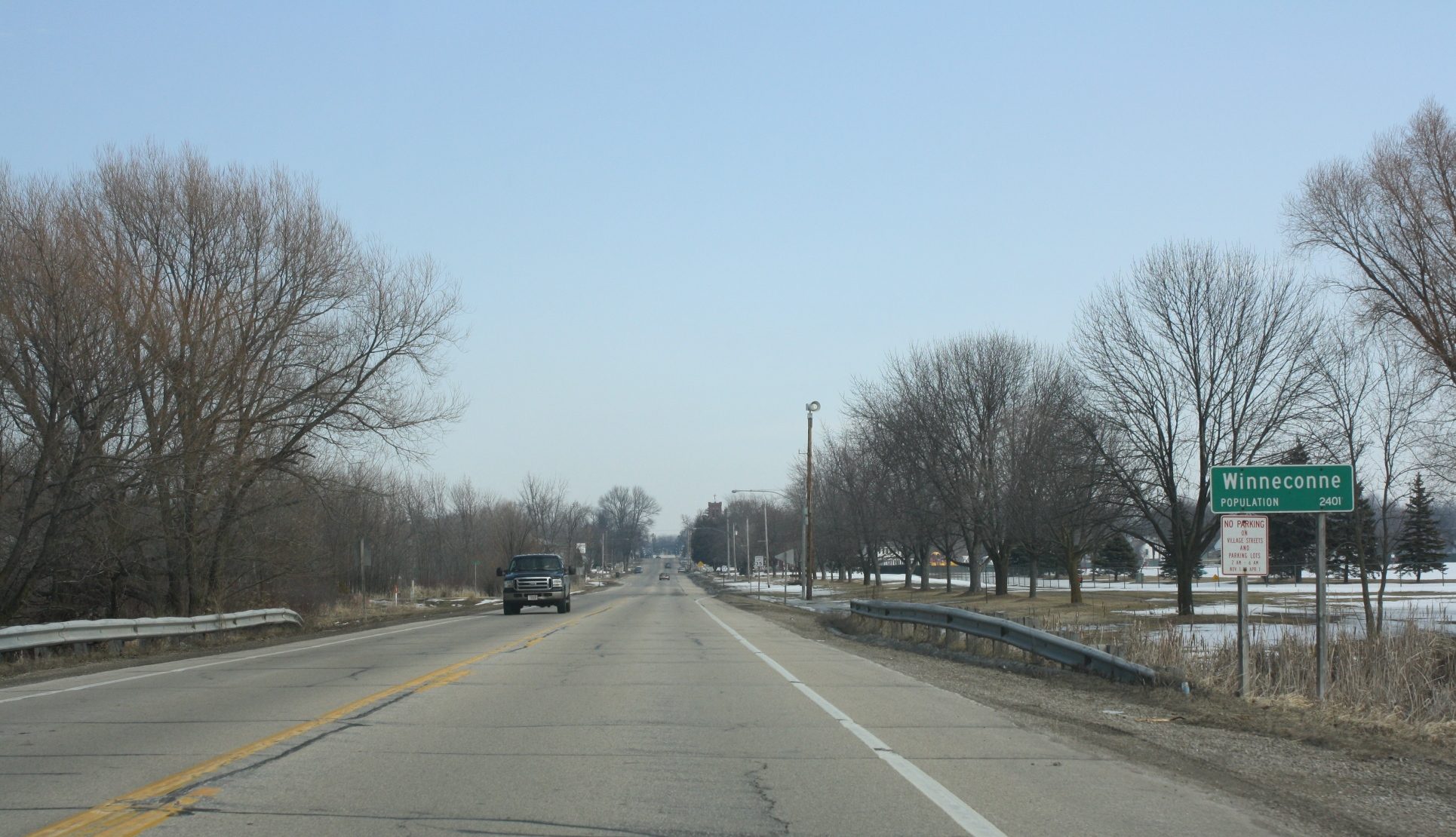
City welcome sign

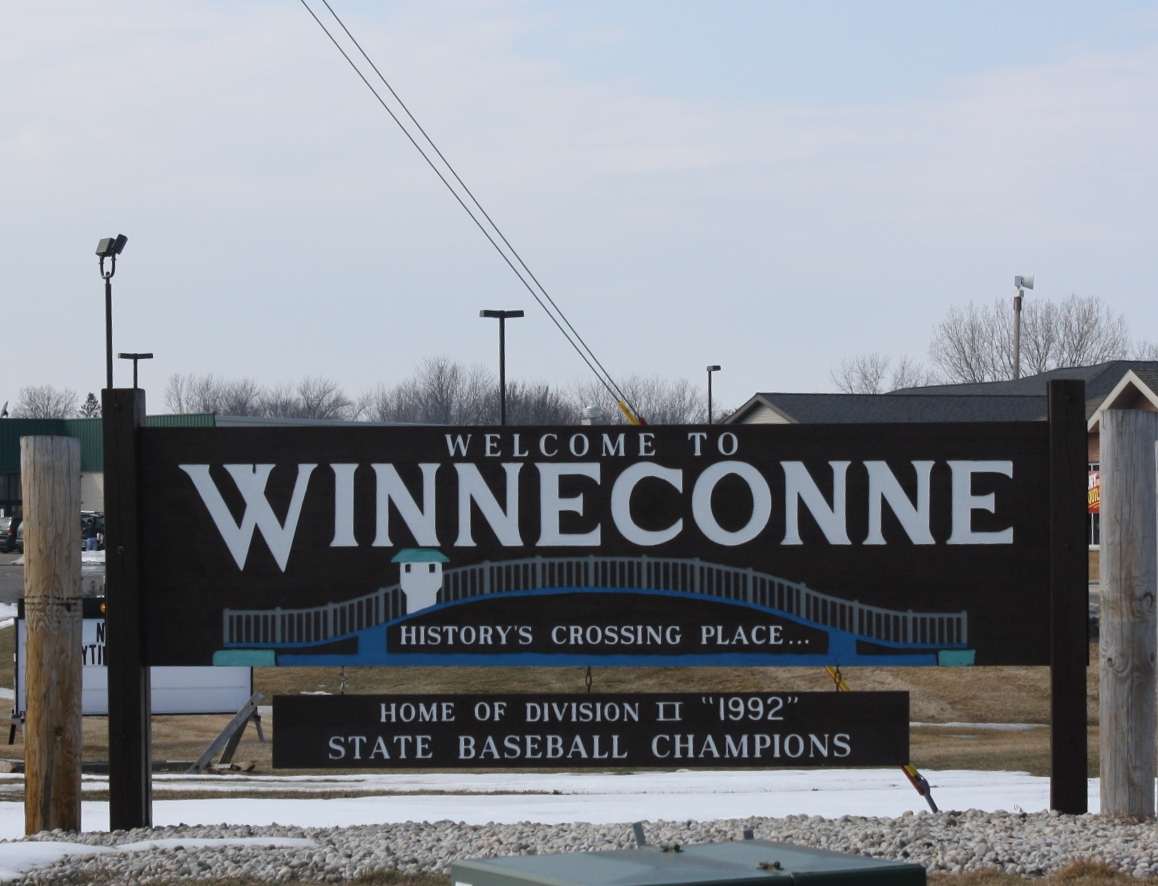
Welcome sign

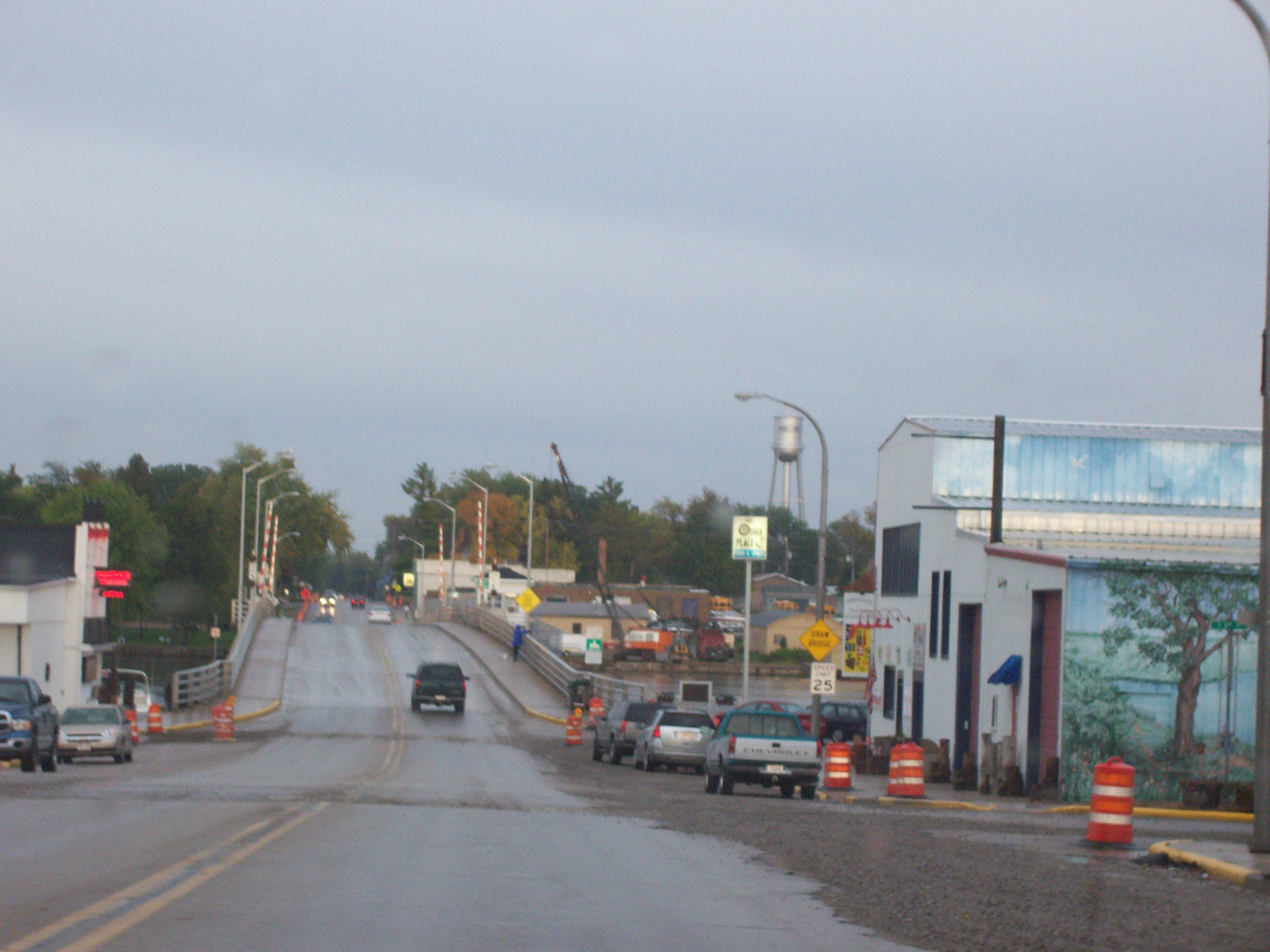
WIS 116 bridge over the Wolf River

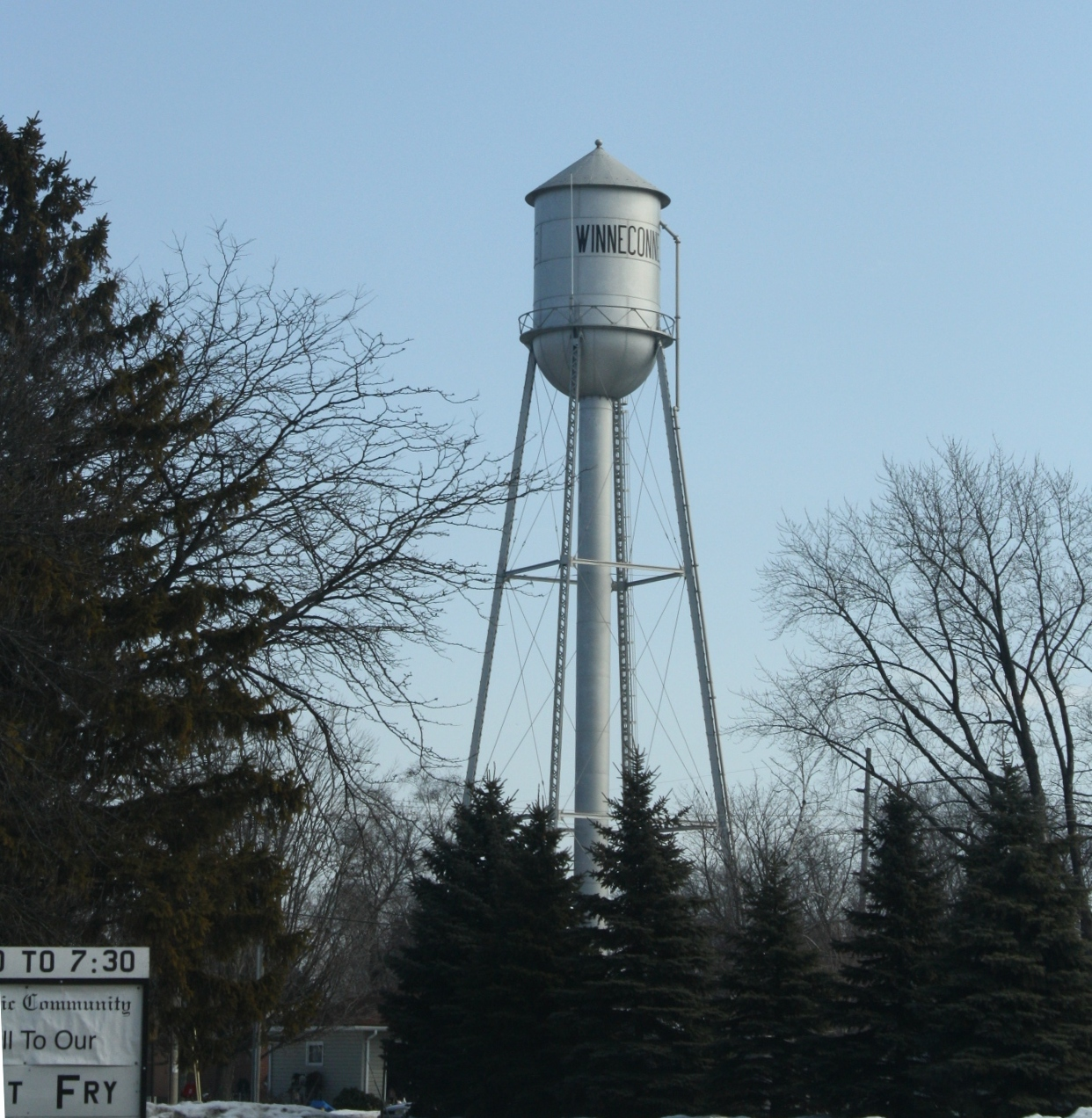
Water tower

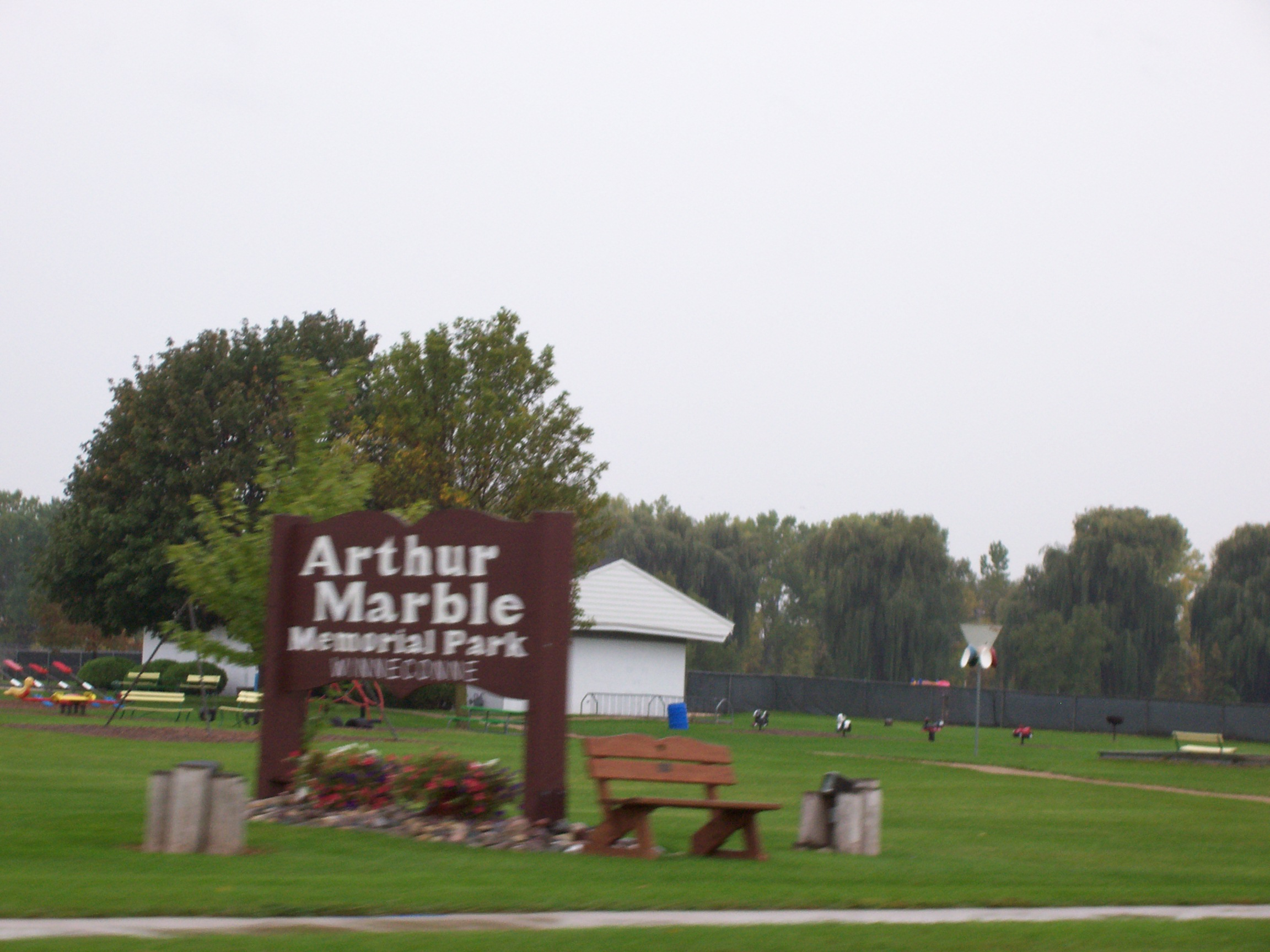
Arthur Marble Memorial Park

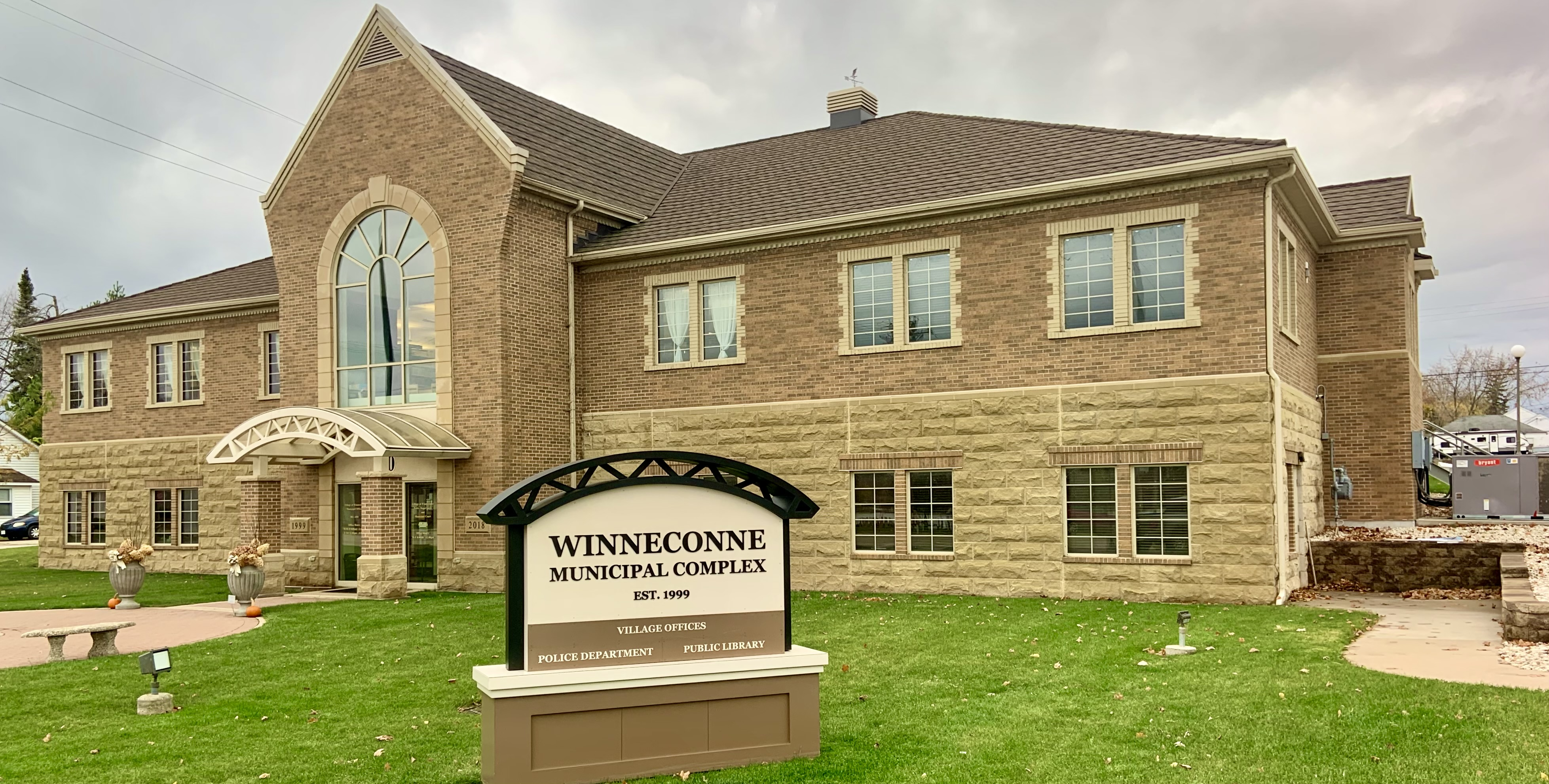
Village hall
