= Wiouwash State Trail =

State trail in Wisconsin

Coordinates: 44°55′41.59″N 89°12′29.1″W

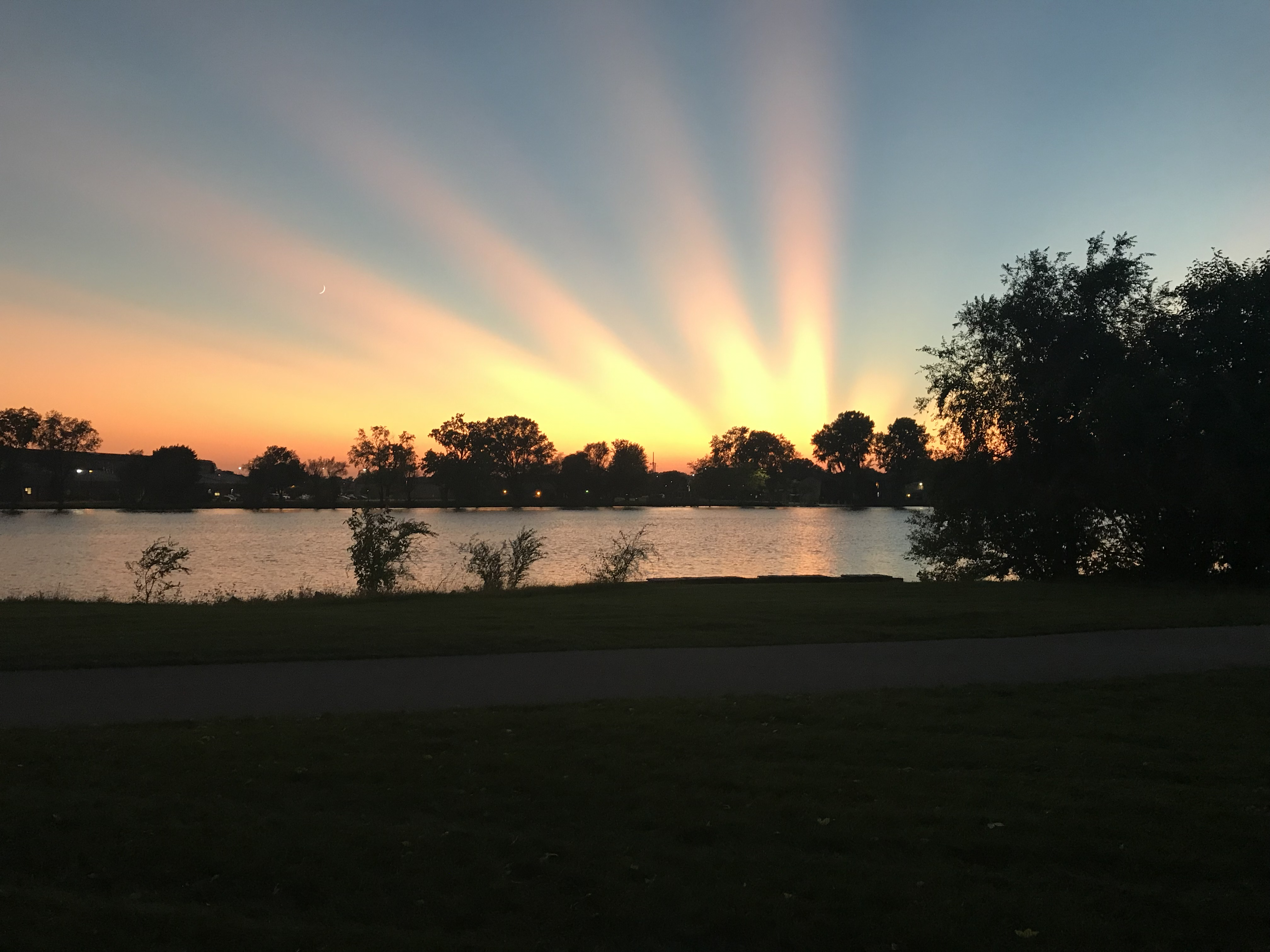
Wiouwash Trail near the Fox River on the UW-Oshkosh campus.

The Wiouwash State Trail is a rail trail in northeastern Wisconsin. Its name is derived from the first two letters of the four counties it traverses: Winnebago, Outagamie, Waupaca, and Shawano. The trail's Tribal Heritage Crossing of Lake Butte des Morts is a nationally designated recreation trail. The trail is used by walkers, hikers, bikers, horseback riders, and snowmobilers during the winter months. Two sections of the trail are complete: 24 miles from Aniwa south to Split Rock and 21 miles from Hortonville south to Oshkosh.

The trail is maintained by local county governments in conjunction with the Wisconsin Department of Natural Resources.

== Northern leg ==
The northern leg of the Wiouwash State Trail is maintained by Shawano County. The northern trailhead is located in downtown Aniwa, Wisconsin. The trail then continues 24 miles to just south of the unincorporated community of Split Rock.

The trail intersects the Mountain-Bay State Trail, which connects the cities of Wausau and Green Bay, in Eland.

Communities along the route include: Aniwa, Birnamwood, Eland, Wittenberg, Tigerton, and Split Rock.

== Southern leg ==
The southern leg of the Wiouwash State Trail is maintained by Outagamie and Winnebago Counties. The northern trailhead in located just south of Black Otter Lake on Lakeview Avenue in Hortonville. The trail continues 21 miles south to its terminus on Westwind Drive in Oshkosh, from which a local trail continues south to downtown Oshkosh.

This section of the trail passes several native tallgrass prairies, crosses numerous rivers and creeks and the Rat River Wildlife Area and runs parallel to the north shore of Lake Butte des Morts' Sunset Bay near Oshkosh. The trail connects to the Friendship State Trail near U.S. Route 10 in Clayton, which provides a connection to trails in the Fox Cities Area.

The Tribal Heritage Crossing is a 1.8 miles (2.9 km) trail that utilizes the Interstate 41 / U.S. 41 bridge over Lake Butte des Morts in Winnebago County. The crossing opened in 2013. It has 13 kiosks featuring Native American history and two fishing spots.

Communities along the route include: Hortonville, Medina, Larsen, and Oshkosh.
