= Wolf River (Fox River tributary) =

Principal tributary of Fox River of Green Bay in eastern Wisconsin

Coordinates: 44°05′33″N 88°41′33″W

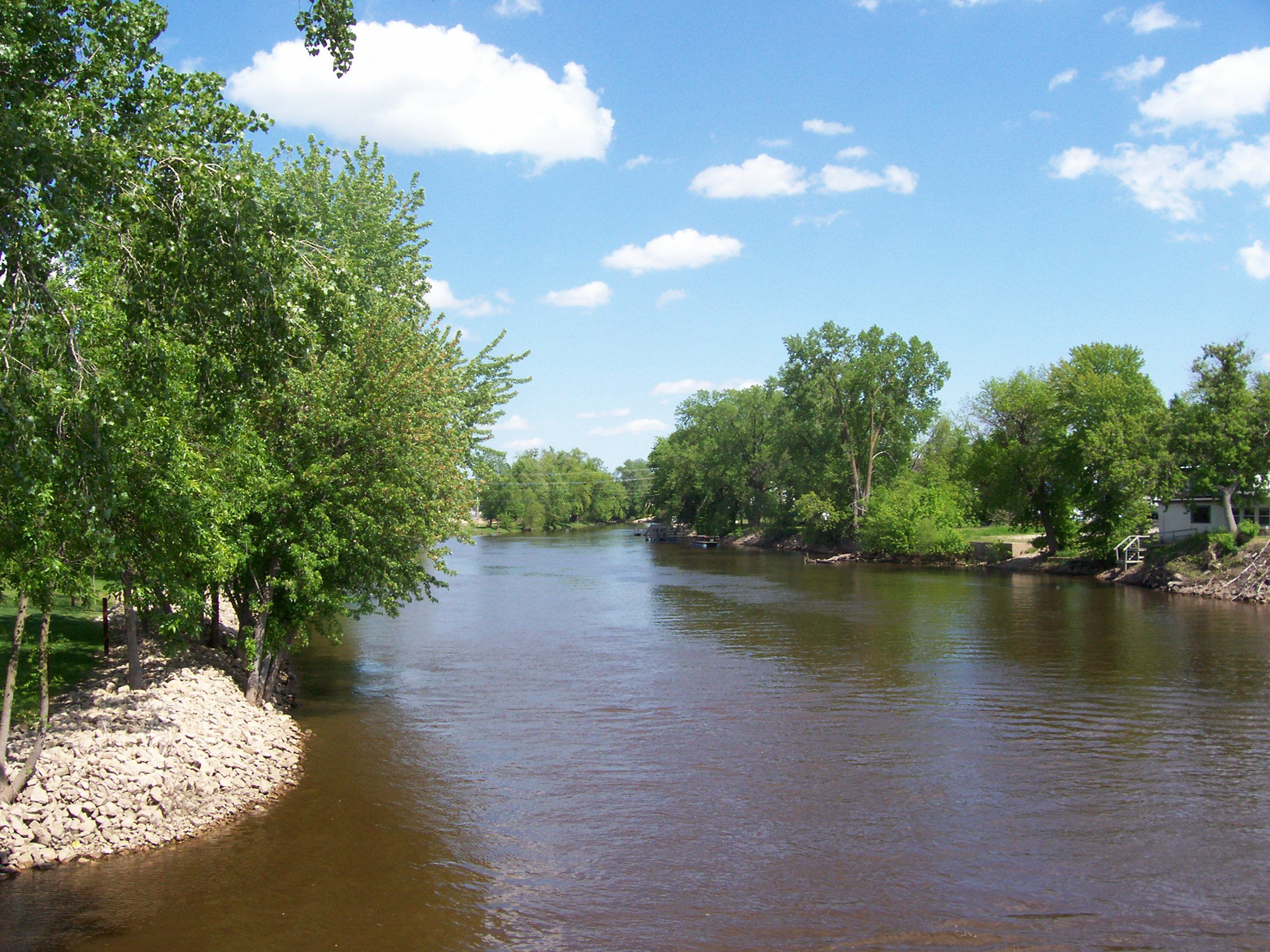
- The Wolf River in downtown New London

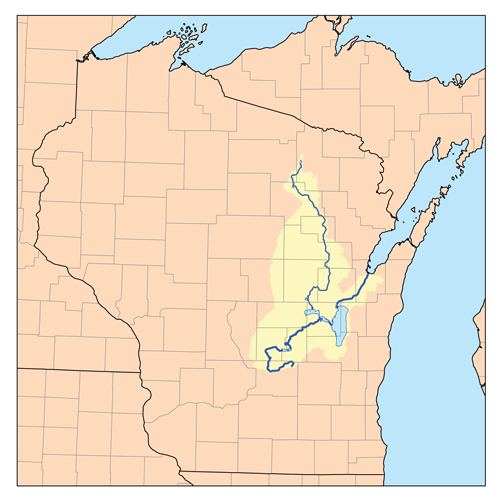
- Map of the Fox River watershed showing the Fox river (lower and right) and Wolf river (higher)

Physical characteristics
- Mouth: Lake Butte des Morts
  - location: Winneconne
  - elevation: 748 ft (228 m)
- Length: 225 m (738 ft)
- Basin size: 3671sq.mi.

Basin features
- River system: Fox-Wolf

National Wild and Scenic River
- Type: Scenic
- Designated: October 2, 1968

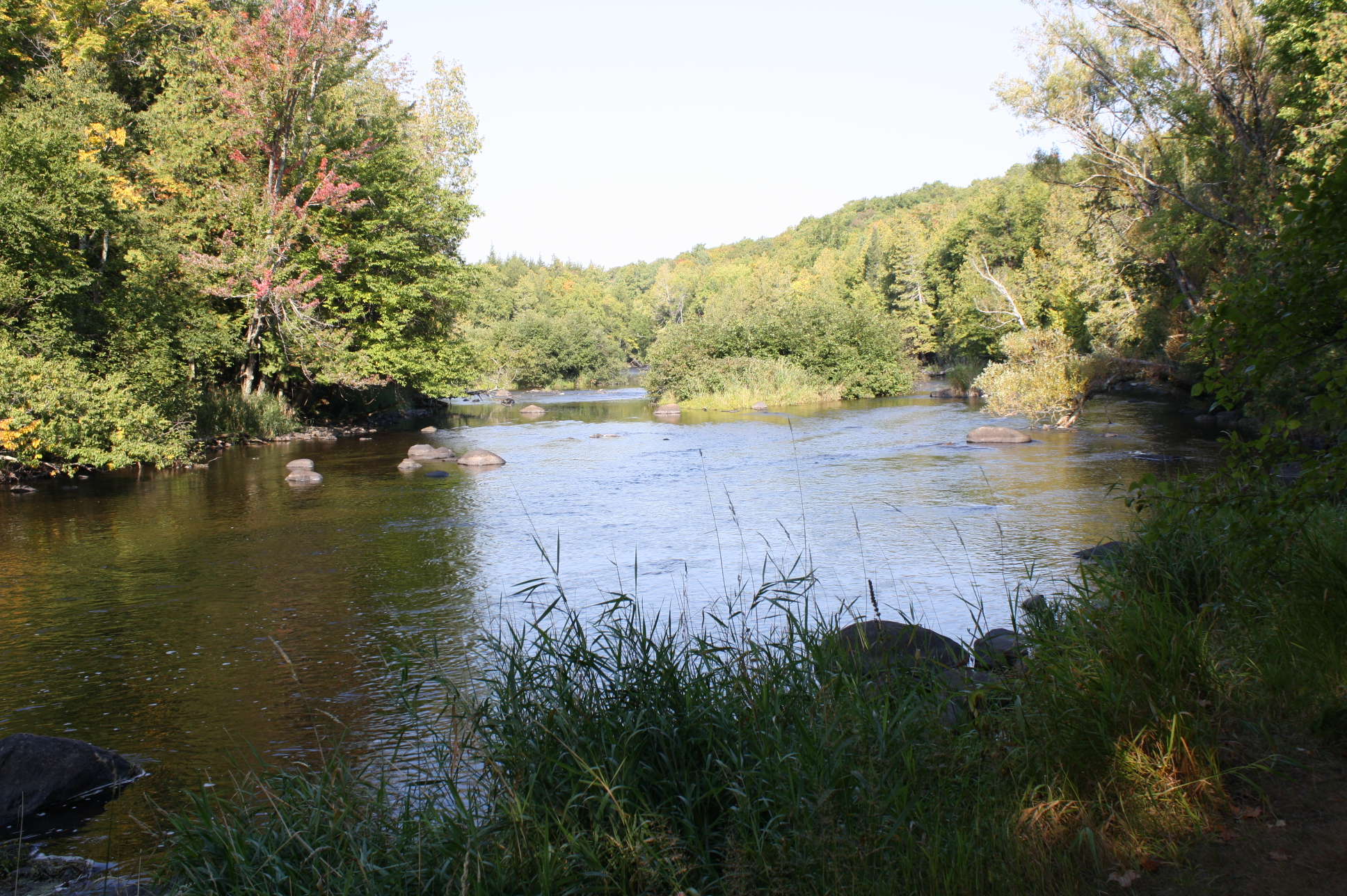
The Wolf River in Langlade County

The Wolf River is a 225 mi (362 km) long tributary of the Fox River in northeastern Wisconsin in the Great Lakes region of the United States. The river is one of the two National Scenic Rivers in Wisconsin, along with the St. Croix River. The scenic portion is 24 miles (39 km) long. The river and its parent the Fox River and associated lakes are known for their sturgeon which spawn every spring upstream on the lower river until blocked by the Shawano Dam. The river flows through mostly undeveloped forestland southerly from central Forest County in the north to Lake Poygan (west of Lake Winnebago) in the south. The lake is part of the Winnebago Pool of lakes fed by both the Fox and Wolf Rivers. The Fox-Wolf basin is usually considered to be a single unified basin and the rivers themselves may be referred to as the Fox-Wolf River system.

The river is known in the Menominee language as Mahwāēw-Sēpēw 'wolf river'.

== Course ==
The Wolf River rises in the southern Headwaters Wilderness of the Nicolet unit of Chequamegon-Nicolet National Forest, with the northernmost fork stemming from the confluence of Wildcat Creek and Pine Creek at Pine Lake in west central Forest County. The river flows south through Langlade and Menominee counties, where whitewater recreation is popular. Menominee County is mostly within the boundaries of the federally recognized Menominee Indian Reservation. Next the Wolf River flows through Shawano County, where it collects the Red River, passes by the city of Shawano. It then flows through Waupaca and Outagamie counties and back into Waupaca County, where it collects the Embarrass River and the Little Wolf at the city of New London. The Wolf River then collects the Waupaca River, then flows through Partridge Lake. The river then flows through Winnebago County and into Lake Poygan and Lake Winneconne. It finally goes through the village of Winneconne to empties into Lake Butte des Morts on the Fox River.

== Hydrology ==
Principal tributaries of the river include Wildcat Creek and Pine Creek (headwaters), Pine River, Rat River, Waupaca River, Little Wolf River, Embarrass River, Shioc River, Red River, Evergreen River, Lily River, and Hunting River.

The river drains into the Fox River at Lake Butte des Morts then via the Fox River into Lake Winnebago and then into lower Green Bay of Lake Michigan. Lake Michigan drains northerly via the Straits of Mackinac into Lake Huron then south and east through the Great Lakes waterways into the St. Lawrence River, which flows northeasterly into the Gulf of St. Lawrence on the Atlantic Ocean.

== Ecology ==
Environmentalists were concerned about preserving the river when the Crandon mine was proposed near a tributary of the river. The Crandon Mine was purchased by the Sokaogon Mole Lake Chippewa Band tribe in 2003 to prevent development that would adversely affect the river. The campaign to stop the Crandon Mine on the Wisconsin's Wolf River was the result of successful coalition-building efforts amongst Wisconsin's indigenous groups, environmentalists, and rural citizens.

=== Restoration of sturgeon spawning ===
Two dams on the upper Wolf River block sturgeon from returning to their historic spawning grounds at Keshena Falls on the Menominee Reservation: the Shawano Dam 125 mi. upstream from Oshkosh, Wisconsin and Balsam Row Dam 5.5 miles above the Shawano Dam, both constructed in the late 1800s. The result was that for over 100 years no sturgeon (or other fish) spawned in the waters above the Shawano Dam. Starting in 2012, the WDNR in conjunction with the Menominee tribe, implemented a sturgeon capture and relocation program to populate the river above the dams with mature sturgeon. Eggs and young fish were also used to achieve a breeding population of sturgeon in Legend Lake, a 1304 acre lake in Menominee County. Sturgeon successfully spawned at the falls the following year. The tribe has proposed that fishways be constructed around both dams to allow spawning from populations in Lake Winnebago. However, due to concerns about aquatic invasive species and Viral hemorrhagic septicemia (VHS), a deadly fish disease, the proposal has not yet been implemented, and the capture and relocation program has continued.

=== Zebra mussels ===
Zebra mussels (Dreissena polymorpha) are small, freshwater, bivalve shellfish native to the Caspian Sea and Black Sea south of Russia and Ukraine. They can clog water intakes and pipes, encrust piers, boats and motors, and cut the feet of swimmers. Zebra mussels have been found in less than 5% of Wisconsin lakes predicted to be suitable for zebra mussels. However, they were detected in the Winnebago Pool including the Wolf River as early as 1999.

== Flora and Fauna ==
=== Fishing ===
There are many different species of fish in the river. In 2016, the Wisconsin state record Quillback was caught in the Wolf River. It was 25.0 inches (64 cm) long and weighed 9 pounds 15.8 ounces (4.53 kg).

==== Sturgeon ====
The Winnebago system, including Wolf and Fox Rivers and associated lakes, is home to the largest population of Lake Sturgeon in the world. The sturgeon which spawn annually in the springtime in the Wolf River and its parent, the Fox River, between approximately April 15 and May 5, as they swim upstream from Lake Winnebago. It is estimated that the extent of the Lake Sturgeon has dropped to about one-tenth of its population in the state since year 1800. This species, which has existed since the time of the dinosaurs (100 million years ago), has a viable naturally reproducing population, which are highly prized for the taste of their flesh, and also for their eggs. Female sturgeon deposit their eggs only about every four to six years, starting at 20 years old, up to their life span of 50 years. At this age, the sturgeon are five feet long. The fish spawn in the shallows of the Wolf river, as they swim upstream.

In order to protect the spawning locations of the sturgeon from poaching when the fish are the most vulnerable, the Wisconsin Department of Natural Resources formed a citizen sturgeon guard called Sturgeon For Tomorrow in the early 1990s. They volunteer to watch over the spawning sites during the spawning season.

==== Walleye ====
The walleye is very popular during their spawning period, during the spring. Many fishermen set out to catch their daily limit. The walleye is probably the most prized fish on the river.

==== White bass ====
The white bass or sand bass (Morone chrysops) is a freshwater fish of the temperate bass family Moronidae that also spawns in the Wolf River. While different fishing methods and techniques are used, the most common is the river rig (also known as the Wolf River rig).

== White Water Recreation ==
The Wolf River boasts nearly 40 miles of white water, ranging from beginner-friendly Class 1 to advanced Class IV rapids. Located mostly in Langlade and Menomonee Counties, the Wolf River is a popular destination for people looking for rafting, kayaking, or tubing adventures.

The river is traditionally broken into four sections, each with its own characteristics and levels of difficulty. Sections 1, 2, and 3 are public-access and free. Section 4 is inside the Menomonee Indian Tribe of Wisconsin boundaries and requires a permit and fee for entry.

Numerous outfitters provide rafting, tubing, and kayaking trips and instruction on the Wolf River.

=== Section 1 ("Upper Wolf") ===
This 10-mile stretch starts with a low class II rapid and is followed by flatwater and class I rapids. There are a few private cottages, but most of the adjacent property is owned by the state DNR. Roadside access is easy and convenient, with gravel parking areas at the County Highway A put-in and the Highway 52 take-out.

=== Section 2 ===
The full trip on Section 2 is about 8 miles and is popular with beginners and tubers because of its variety of Class I and Class II rapids. The top 5 miles offer several sections of flat water punctuated by four Class II rapids. Many people choose the bottom 3-mile section called “Irrigation Ditch to Langlade” due to less flat water, an easy shuttle, and higher concentration of rapids on the stretch. The short section can be done in about three hours and is a popular route with local boaters and commercial outfitters in the area.

=== Section 3 ===
The full Section 3 is about 10 miles and starts at the Section 2 take-out in Langlade. The top six miles have some significant flat water, so many paddlers choose to put in at the DNR landing off of County Highway M, often called Herb’s Landing. The three main rapids in Section 3, named Boyscout (Class II+), Hansens (Class II), and Gilmore’s Mistake (Class III), are all in the lower section.

=== Section 4 ===
This 12 mile section travels through land owned by the Menomonee Indian Tribe of Wisconsin. Paddlers must obtain a permit and pay an access fee before putting on the river. The full Section 4 starts immediately below the Section 3 take-out. The first 6 miles, sometimes called the “Upper Section IV,” mainly contains two Class II rapids and a more challenging Class III ledge. Most paddlers choose to run the bottom 6 miles, starting at the Otter Slide put-in and ending at Big Smokey Falls. This section is the most challenging on the river and features three Class III rapids, three Class III+ rapids, and one Class IV.

== Points of interest ==
Two towns named for the river are on the river: Wolf River, Winnebago County and Wolf River, Langlade County.

== See also ==
- List of rivers of Wisconsin
- Shawano Lake
- Menominee Indian Reservation
