= Lake Butte des Morts =

Lake in Winnebago County, Wisconsin

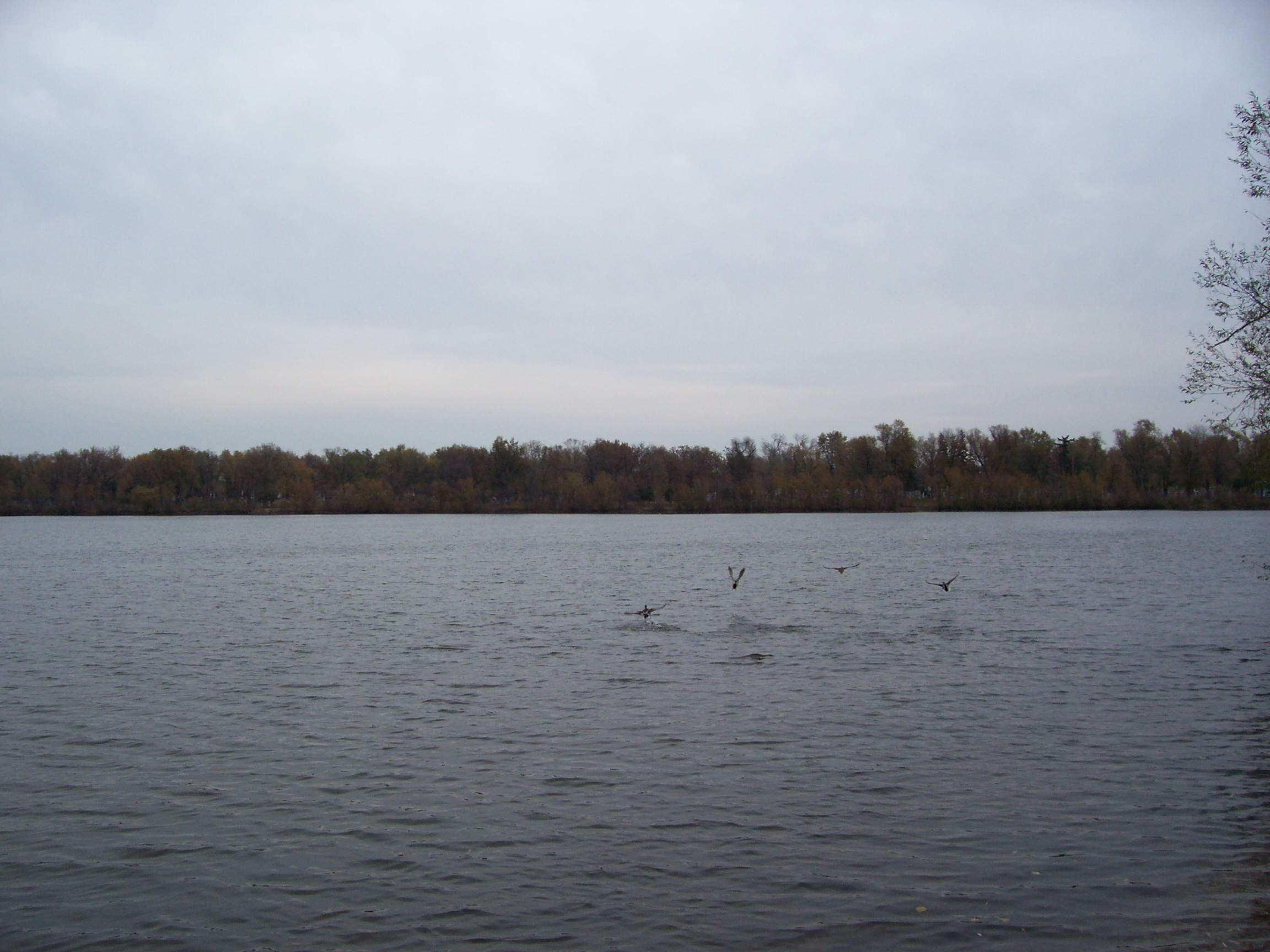
- Lake Butte des Morts

- Location within Wisconsin
- Location: Winnebago County, Wisconsin, United States
- Coordinates: 44°04′23″N 088°38′31″W
- Primary inflows: Fox River, Wolf River
- Primary outflows: Fox River
- Basin countries: United States
- Max. length: 11.6 km (7 mi)
- Max. width: 2.8 km (2 mi)
- Surface area: 34.7 km^{2} (8,575 acres)
- Average depth: 2.1 m (7 ft)
- Max. depth: 2.7 m (9 ft)
- Water volume: 65,550,085 m^{3} (1.7316500×10^{10} US gal)
- Residence time: 6 days
- Shore length^{1}: 50.6 km (31 mi)
- Surface elevation: 226 m (741 ft)
- Settlements: Oshkosh, Wisconsin, Butte des Morts, Wisconsin
- ^{1} Shore length is not a well-defined measure.

Big Lake Butte des Morts (/ˌbjuːdəˈmɔːr/ BEW-də-MOR) is a shallow freshwater lake located in the U.S. state of Wisconsin, in Winnebago County. It is part of the Winnebago Pool (also known as the Winnebago System) of lakes in east central Wisconsin, along with Lake Winnebago, Lake Poygan, and Lake Winneconne. The lake is fed by the Fox River in the southwest and the Wolf River draining from Lake Winneconne in the northwest, and drains via the Fox River southeast into Lake Winnebago. The lake is part of the Butte des Morts region in Winnebago County, Wisconsin. This lake is not connected to Little Lake Butte des Morts, which is located to the north, downstream of Lake Winnebago, fed by the lower Fox River.

The name "Butte des Morts" was given by French colonial settlers. It means "Mound of the Dead", in reference to a nearby prehistoric Native American burial mound. In the Menominee language this place is known as Paehkuahkīhsaeh which means "small mound".

== Physical aspects ==
With a surface area of 34.7 km^{2} (8,575 acres), it is the second smallest of the Winnebago Pool Lakes after Lake Winneconne. Much of the lake is flooded marshland, which was created by the damming of the Fox River downstream in Menasha in the 19th century. This has resulted in the lake's flat and shallow character, with a maximum depth of 2.7 m (9 ft). It is rather narrow, with a maximum length of 11.6 km (7 mi) but a maximum width of just 2.8 km (2 mi). Its total watershed (the combined drainage areas of the Fox and Wolf Rivers plus minor tributaries) is 5,566.2 square miles (14,416 km^{2}). Surface water temperature varies from a minimum of about 0.4 °C (33 °F) in the winter to a maximum of about 26.7 °C (80 °F) in the summer. The extensive littoral zone will usually freeze over in the winter, though only during particularly cold winters does the entire lake freeze over. The lake is polymictic, maintaining a continuously mixed water column with no patterns of seasonal temperature stratification.

== Water quality ==
Lake Butte des Morts is classified as eutrophic. The lake is listed with the Wisconsin DNR as having "impaired" water quality, citing high levels of phosphorus, mercury, and PCBs and low levels of dissolved oxygen, among other problems. Much of these pollutants enter the watershed from agricultural and urban runoff. Large algal blooms and high E. coli populations occasionally make the water unsafe for swimming. The water is typically a murky brown or green color, with high turbidity, though prior to the 1970s the water was reported to be much clearer. Lake Butte des Morts has been the subject of numerous DNR management and monitoring projects aimed at protecting or improving water quality, often alongside other bodies of water in the same watershed.

== Biology ==
Fish species found in the lake include walleye, drum, white bass, largemouth bass, smallmouth bass, carp, flathead and channel catfish, northern pike, crappie, yellow perch, bluegill and sturgeon. Wetland plants common in and around the lake are American lotus, common reed, and wild rice. Invasive species include Chinese mystery snail, curly-leaf pondweed, Eurasian watermilfoil, round goby, rusty crayfish, and zebra mussel. Dominant phytoplankton genera include Anabaena, Scenedesmus, and Melosira.

== Human use ==
The city of Oshkosh lies between Lake Butte des Morts and Lake Winnebago. The unincorporated community of Butte des Morts lies on the lake's northern shore, west of Oshkosh. Lake Butte des Morts is part of the Fox-Wisconsin Waterway, which used to be used to travel between the Mississippi River and Lake Michigan, but with the closure of both the Portage Canal and the locks on the lower Fox River has ceased operation. A marked navigation channel guides passage across the lake from the inflow of the Wolf River in the west (connecting to Lake Poygan), to the outflow of the Fox River east to Lake Winnebago, a remnant of the waterway. Lake Butte des Morts is popular among both fishermen and recreational boaters during the warm months, and with ice fishermen in the winter. U.S. Highway 41 (US 41) / Interstate 41 (I41) spans the east end of the lake via a bridge and causeway combination. The bridge includes the Tribal Heritage Crossing, a designated national trail, which is a portion of the Wiouwash State Trail. Terrell's Island is a DNR-organized wetlands conservation project located on the south shore, enclosed by a breakwall that extends some distance into the lake.

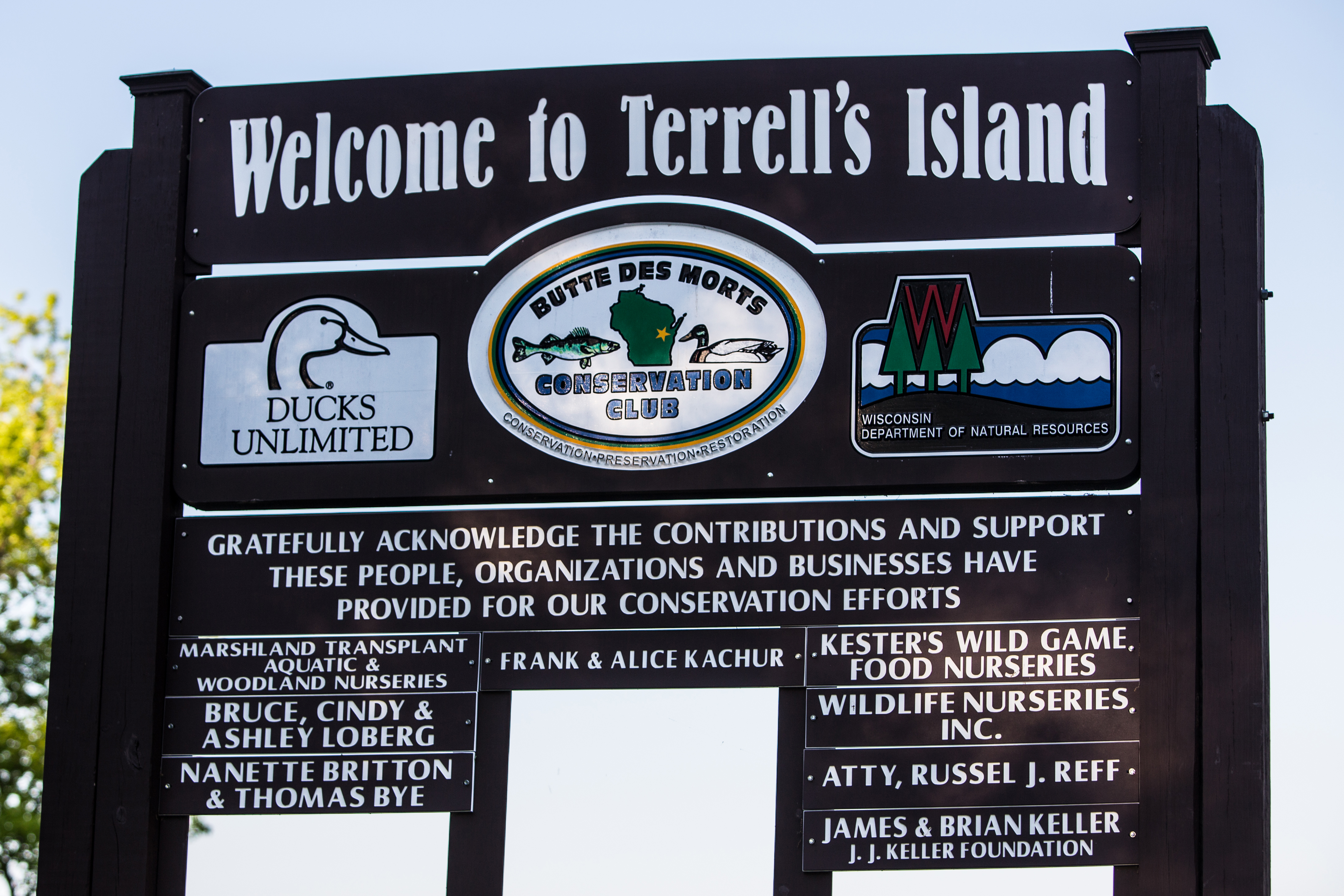
Welcome sign at the entrance to Terrell's Island

== Gallery ==
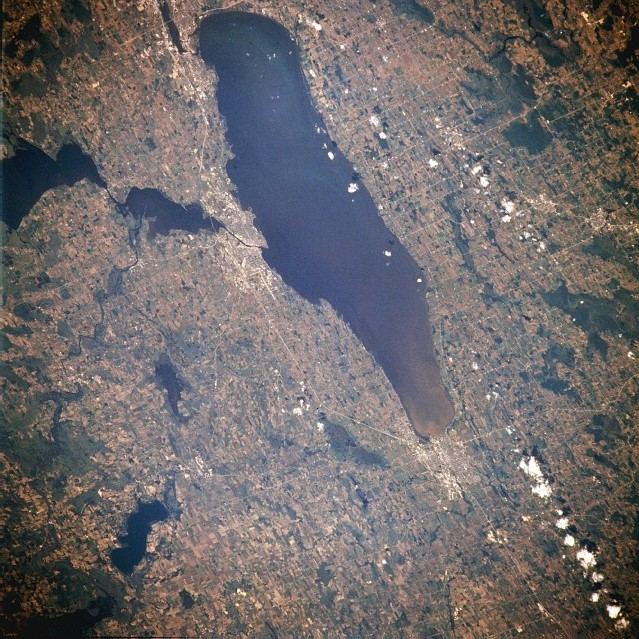
Winnebago pool, July 1996. Lake Winnebago is in the center, with Lake Butte des Morts just to the left of the center of the lake.

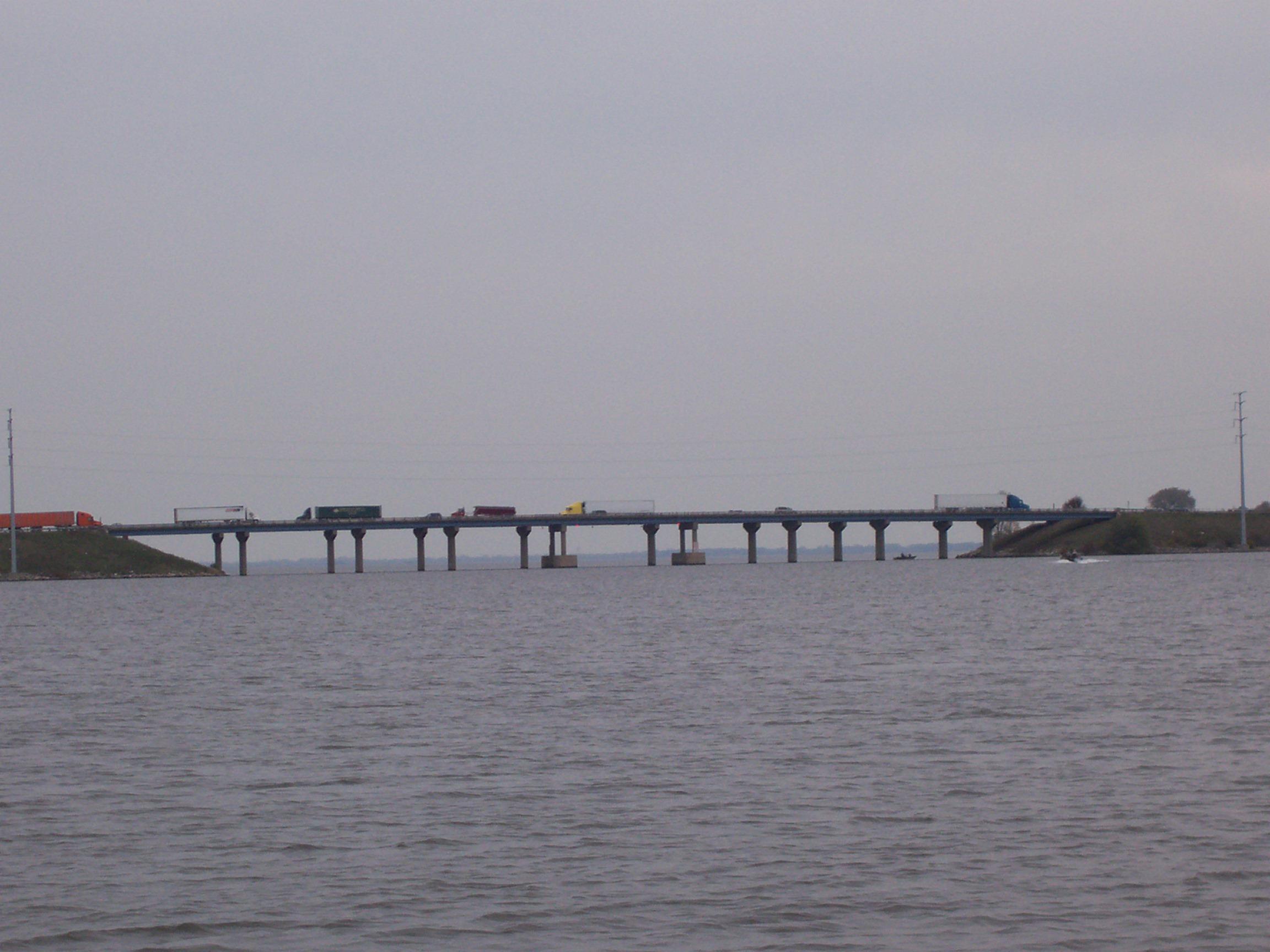
Interstate 41 bridge over Lake Butte des Morts

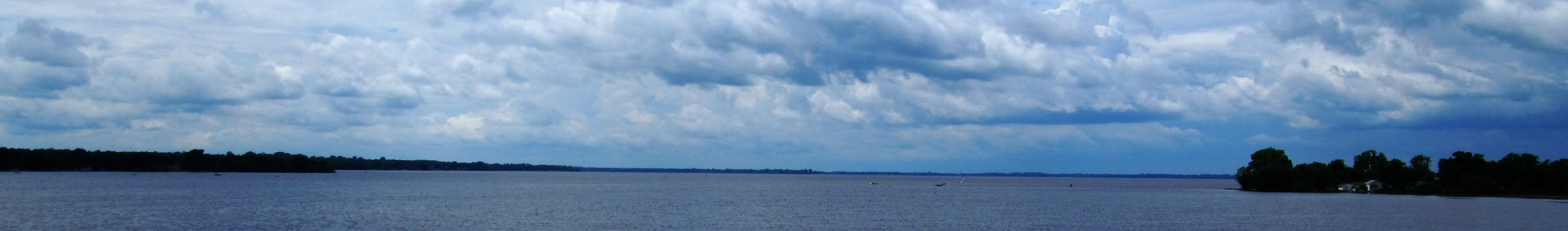
A view of Lake Butte des Morts, looking west from the Interstate 41 bridge

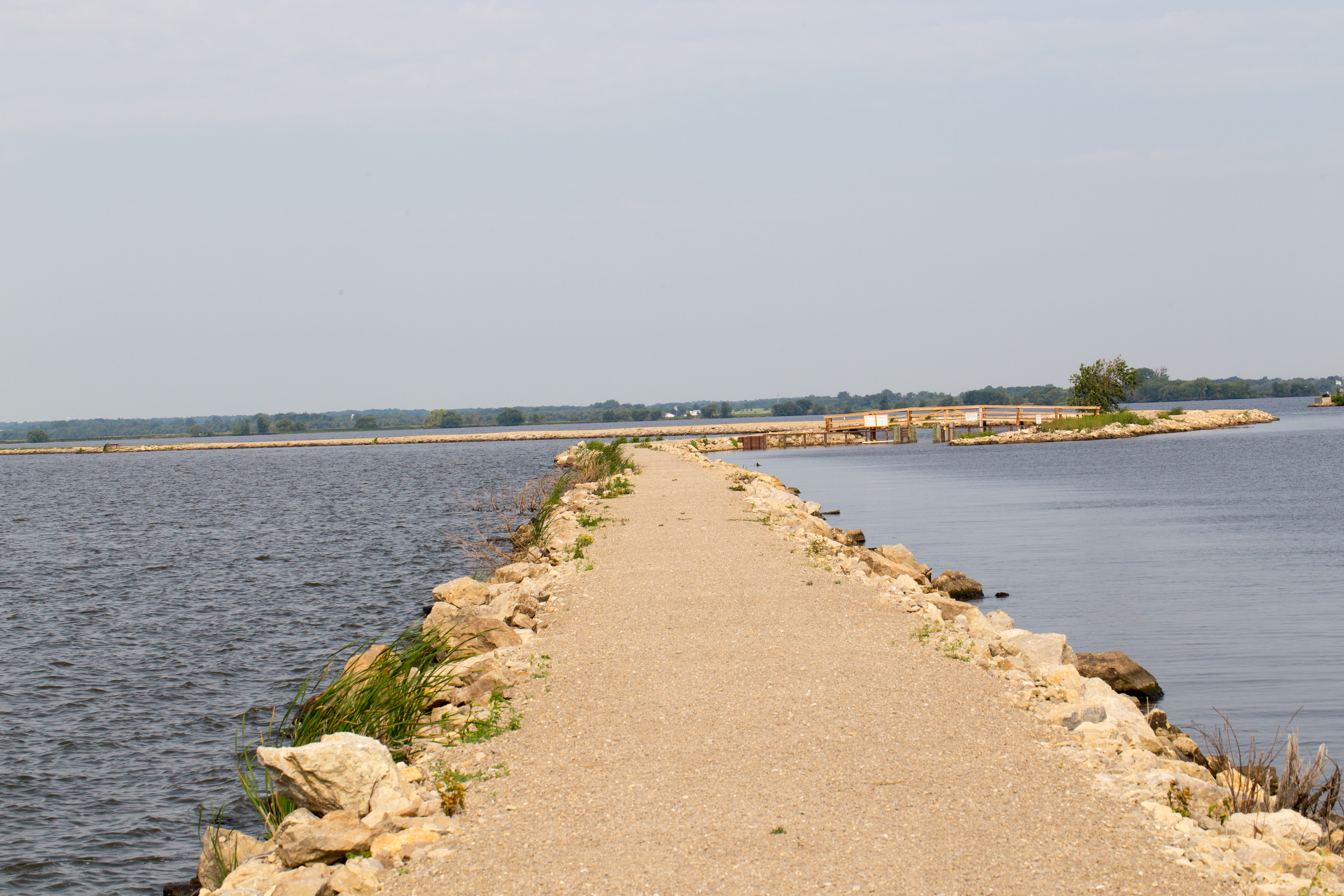
View of Lake Butte des Morts from the public trail on the Terrell's Island breakwall
