= Lake Winnebago =

Lake in Wisconsin

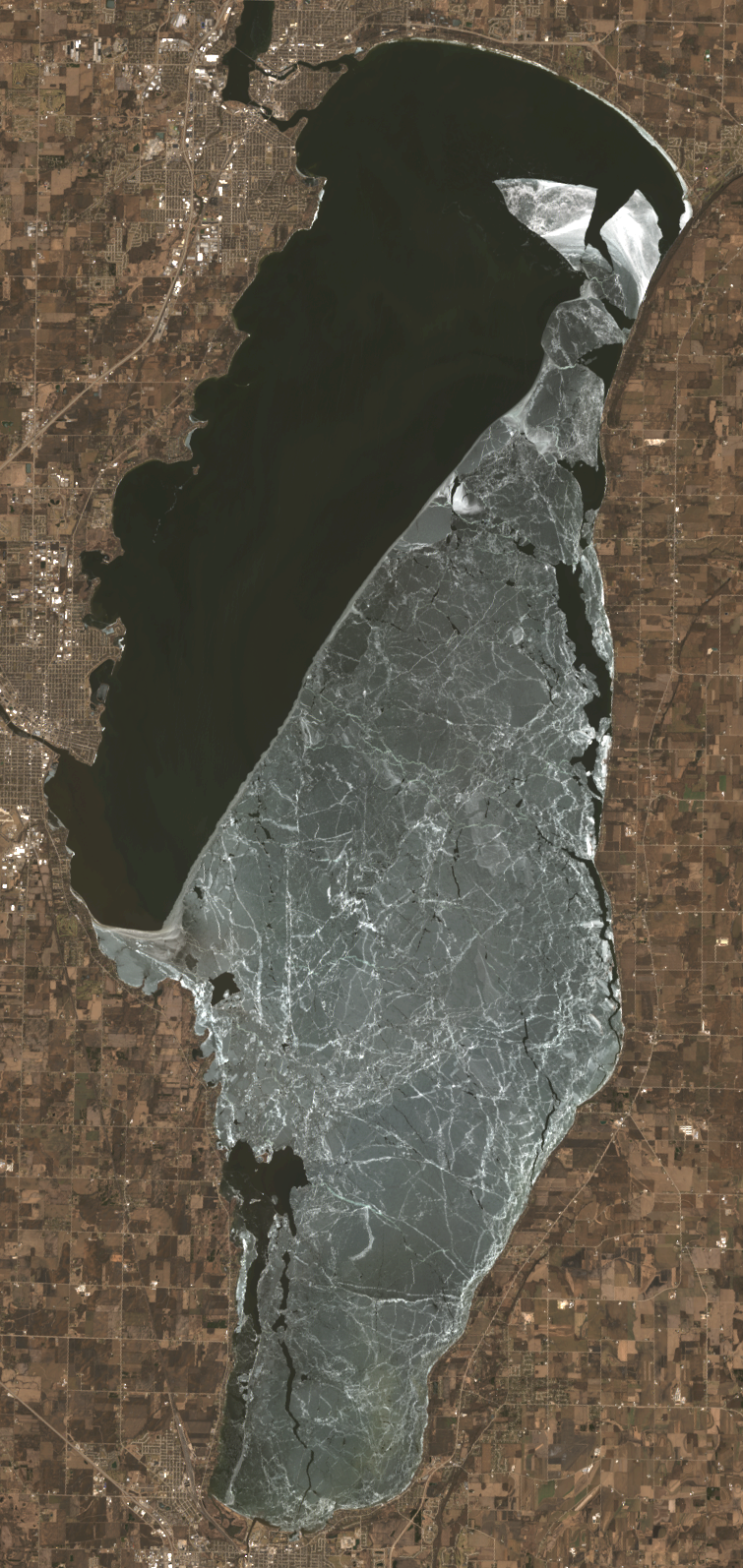
- From space on March 28, 2022 (partial ice cover)

- Location within Wisconsin Location within the United States
- Location: Winnebago, Calumet, and Fond du Lac counties, Wisconsin
- Coordinates: 44°00′45″N 88°25′03″W
- Primary inflows: Wolf River, Fox River
- Primary outflows: Fox River
- Basin countries: United States
- Max. length: 30 miles (50 km)
- Max. width: 10 miles (15 km)
- Surface area: 131,939 acres (206.155 sq mi; 533.94 km^{2})
- Average depth: 15.5 ft (4.7 m)
- Max. depth: 21 ft (6.4 m)
- Surface elevation: about 746 ft (227 m) above sea level
- Settlements: Oshkosh, Fond du Lac, Neenah and Menasha

Lake Winnebago (Menominee: Wenepekōw Nepēhsæh, Ojibwe: Wiinibiigoo-zaaga'igan, Oneida: kanyataláheleˀ) is a shallow freshwater lake in the north central United States, located in east central Wisconsin. At 137,700 acres (55,700 ha), it is the largest lake entirely within the state, covering an area of about 30 miles (48 km) by 10 miles (16 km) with 88 miles (142 km) of shoreline, an average depth of 15.5 feet (4.7 m), and a maximum depth of 21 feet (6.4 m). It has many shallow reefs along the west shore and a drop-off type shoreline on the east. There are several islands along the west shore.

The lake has two primary tributaries, the Wolf and Fox Rivers, which combine at Lake Butte des Morts. The Fox River flows east through Oshkosh and into Lake Winnebago at its west central shore, then flows out at the northwest shore, around Doty Island at Neenah-Menasha to Little Lake Butte des Morts. The river then flows northeast and empties into Green Bay and serves as part of the Fox-Wisconsin Waterway. Lake Winnebago is part of a larger system of lakes in Wisconsin known as the Winnebago Pool.

Cities on its shores include the aforementioned Oshkosh, Neenah, and Menasha, as well as Fond du Lac at the south shore. Municipal drinking water systems serving over 200,000 people draw directly from the lake, including systems serving the cities of Oshkosh, Neenah, Menasha, and Appleton.

== History ==
The lake is a remnant of Glacial Lake Oshkosh approximately 12,000 years ago. Ice blocked water from entering Lake Michigan at Green Bay, and the glacial lake ponded against ice since it had no outlet.

The Niagara Escarpment is a few miles east of Lake Winnebago. The softer Ordovician rocks that underlie the lake have eroded away, and the stronger Silurian rocks stand as a ridge that formed the lake basin.

In 1634, the French encountered the Ho-Chunk on the shores of Green Bay, inhabiting the area stretching to Lake Winnebago. Although "Ho-Chunk" is the people's own name for themselves, their Algonquian neighbors called them "Winnebago", which means "[people of the] stinking water." This term was used by the Algonquians because Lake Winnebago had a strong fish odor in the summer.

The steamer B. F. Carter made a trip from the east shore to the west shore at Oshkosh every two weeks in the 1880s during the summer season.

Lake Winnebago is known for having occasional ice shoves on very windy days in March as the winter ice breaks up. Residents have described that it "sounds like a freight train." Buildings directly on the shoreline have been wrecked by the shoves, which are up to 25 feet (7.6 m) high.

On July 27, 2026 a powerful thunderstorm produced an EF-3 rated tornado west of Appleton. The tornado continued due south onto Lake Winnebago for 12.1 miles. This resulted in major damage to buildings and businesses in Appleton and Menasha With the estimated 140 mph winds and a majority of the tornados path over Lake Winnebago, it produced a meteotsunami. This was caught on camera by a bystander in their car at Adella Beach in Neenah. The storm surge is estimated at 3 ft.

== Locks and dams ==
Lake Winnebago is not man-made, but its level was raised about three feet (0.9 m) by two dams on either side of Doty Island, erected in 1850 and 1930. The lake level is today regulated by the U.S. Army Corps of Engineers to meet demands for flood control, to reduce ice damage to private property, to release water for hydropower and pollution dilution downstream, and to extend the high water season for boating.

A system of seventeen locks connects Lake Winnebago to Lake Michigan at Green Bay, an elevation drop of about 150 feet (45 m). This lock system is located along the lower Fox River and starts at the northwest corner of Lake Winnebago in the city of Menasha and ends at the mouth of Green Bay. One of the locks, the Rapid Croche Lock, is permanently sealed as a barrier to prevent the movement of sea lamprey upstream, and only three of the remaining locks were being maintained. Lock reconstruction is underway and is being supervised by the Fox River Navigation Authority.

== Recreation ==
Many annual events take place on the Winnebago Pool, including shoreline concerts, fishing tournaments, power boat events, pleasure boating rallies, windsurfing, sail runs and ice racing.

=== Boating ===
Along with the upper lakes of Big Lake Butte des Morts, Winneconne, Poygan, the Wolf River and the upper and lower Fox River, it is a popular pleasure boating area. A 1989 survey of boating intensity by the Wisconsin Department of Natural Resources ranked the Winnebago Pool as the state's busiest inland waterway, surpassing the Mississippi River.

=== Parks ===
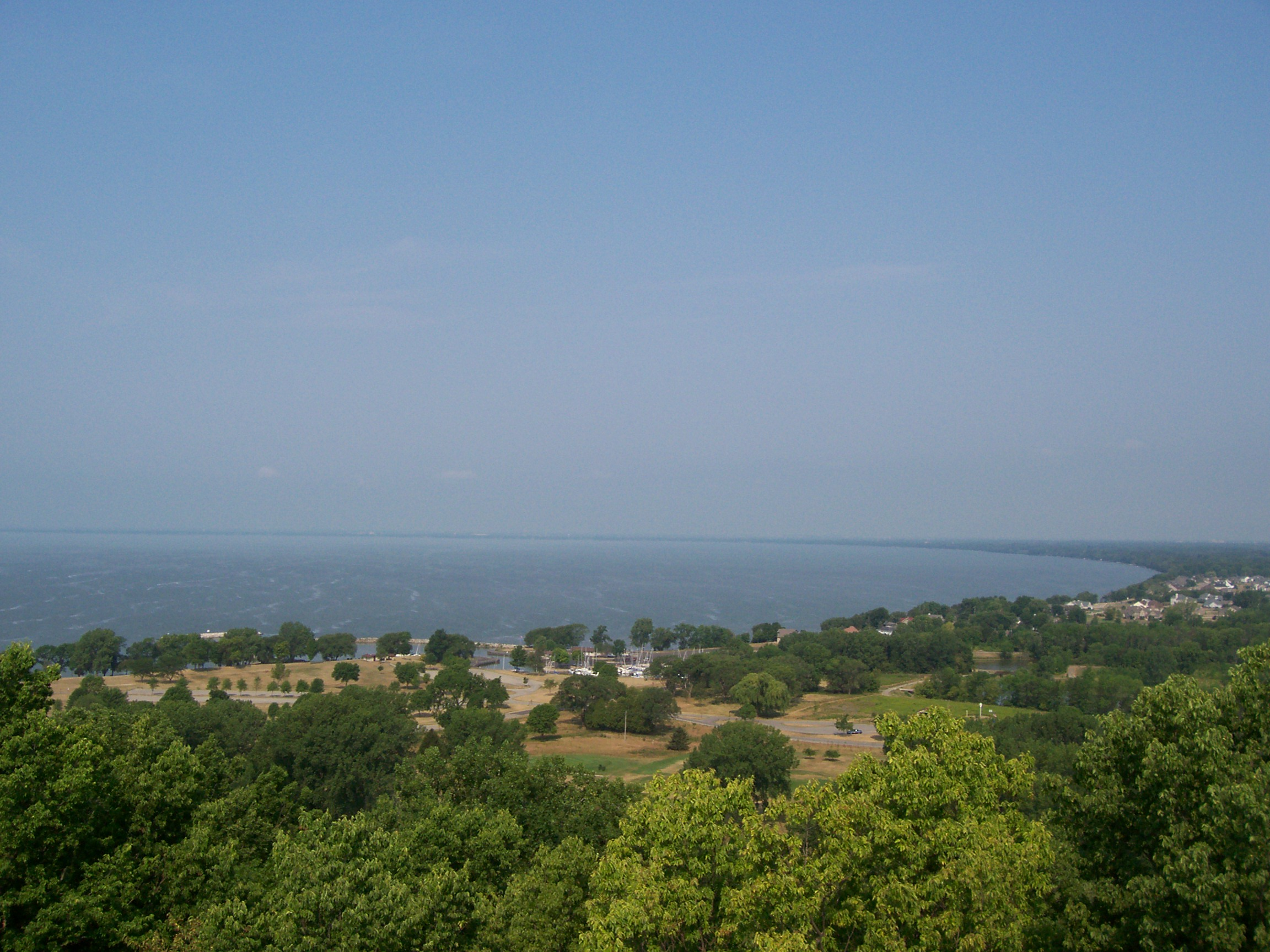
Looking west at the north end of Lake Winnebago from High Cliff State Park

High Cliff State Park on the lake's northeast shore offers camping, hiking trails, views of the lake, a marina, beach, an observation tower, and picnic areas. Camping is available at Calumet County Park and Columbia County Park in Fond du Lac County. Effigy mounds overlook the lake at High Cliff and Calumet County Park.

Lakeside Park in Fond du Lac is a 400-acre (1.6 km^{2}) municipal park on the southern shore of Lake Winnebago with picnic areas, shelters/gazebos, a playground, a deer park, baseball diamonds, a marina, and boat launch ramps. Train rides, an old fashioned carousel, bumper boats, aqua bikes, and canoes are available for rides. A petting zoo is open Memorial Day weekend through Labor Day. The Fond du Lac River enters Lake Winnebago on the eastern border of the park.

Menominee Park in Oshkosh features trails, fishing piers, boat launches, a zoo, a small amusement park, and softball, tennis and basketball facilities. It is the former site of the city's Sawdust Days Festival in July.

=== Fishing ===
Lake Winnebago is one of the more heavily fished lakes in the state. Many fishermen consider it one of the nation's top walleye fisheries. Other species present include bluegill, largemouth bass, muskellunge, northern pike, perch, burbot, white bass, crappie, freshwater drum, channel catfish, flathead catfish, and smallmouth bass. In June 2010, Oshkosh hosted an event recognized by Guinness World Records as history's largest fishing tournament. A 2007 study put the economic value of recreational fishing at approximately $300 million per year.

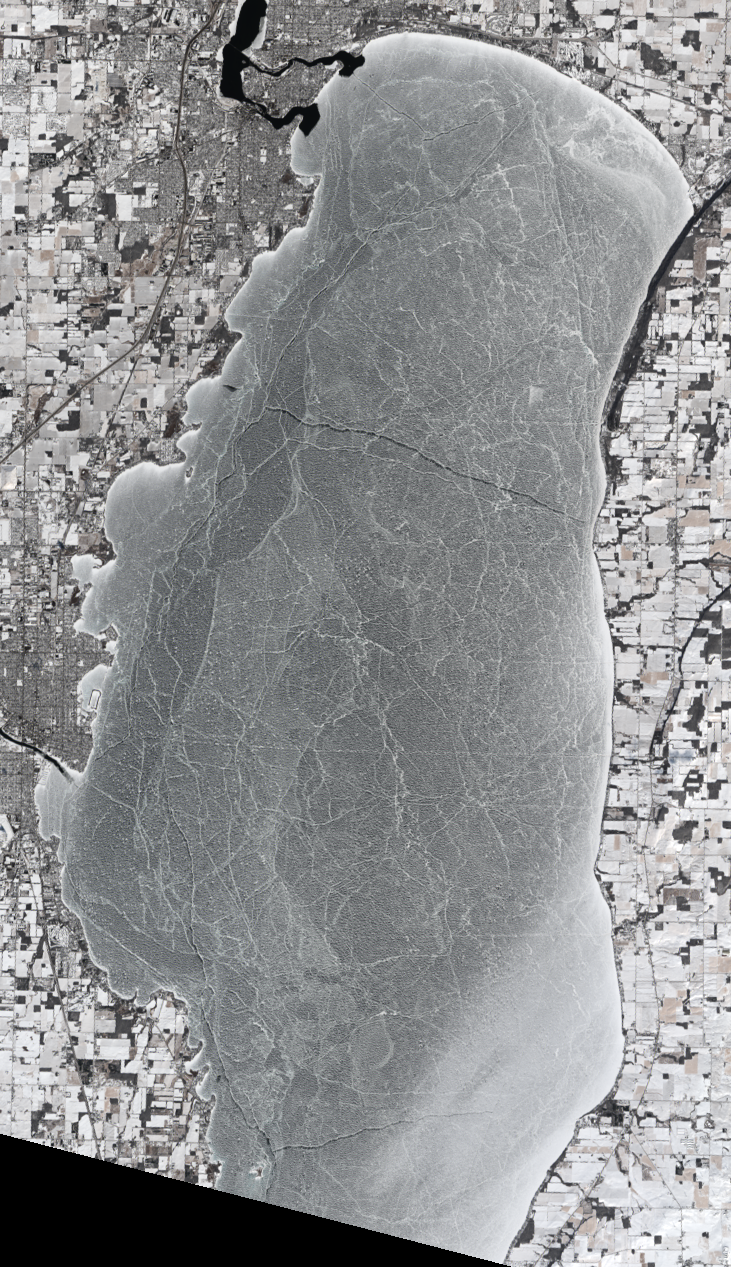
Landsat 8, February 25, 2022

==== Winter ====
Ice fishing is popular on Lake Winnebago, and it is not uncommon for 10,000 cars to park on it during the ice fishing season. Expansion cracks on the ice are bridged, and many cities along the east and west shores plow roads on the icy surface. Sauger and walleye predominate, with rare perch and white bass catches.

The spearfishing season for lake sturgeon is in February. The first year of regulated sturgeon spearing was 1903, when an eight-pound limit was introduced. All sturgeon spearing was banned from 1915 to 1931. The lake had the largest population of sturgeon in the United States in 2003. The Wisconsin Department of Natural Resources regulates the number of fish taken each year.

==== Other seasons ====
Late spring (between May 5 and June 30) is dominated by walleye and sauger fishing. Sauger, also known as sand pike, bite the best in cooler water. June is the peak time for fishing white bass, while perch is commonly fished in July. Fishing declines in fall.

== In popular culture ==
The setting for Dr. Seuss's classic 1948 children's book Thidwick the Big-Hearted Moose is "Lake Winna-Bango" on the "far northern shore."

The lake is one of thirteen shown in James Benning's 2004 film 13 Lakes.

Singer/songwriter Bill Callahan has a song titled, and about, Lake Winnebago on his 2026 album My Days of 58.

== Map in 1835 ==
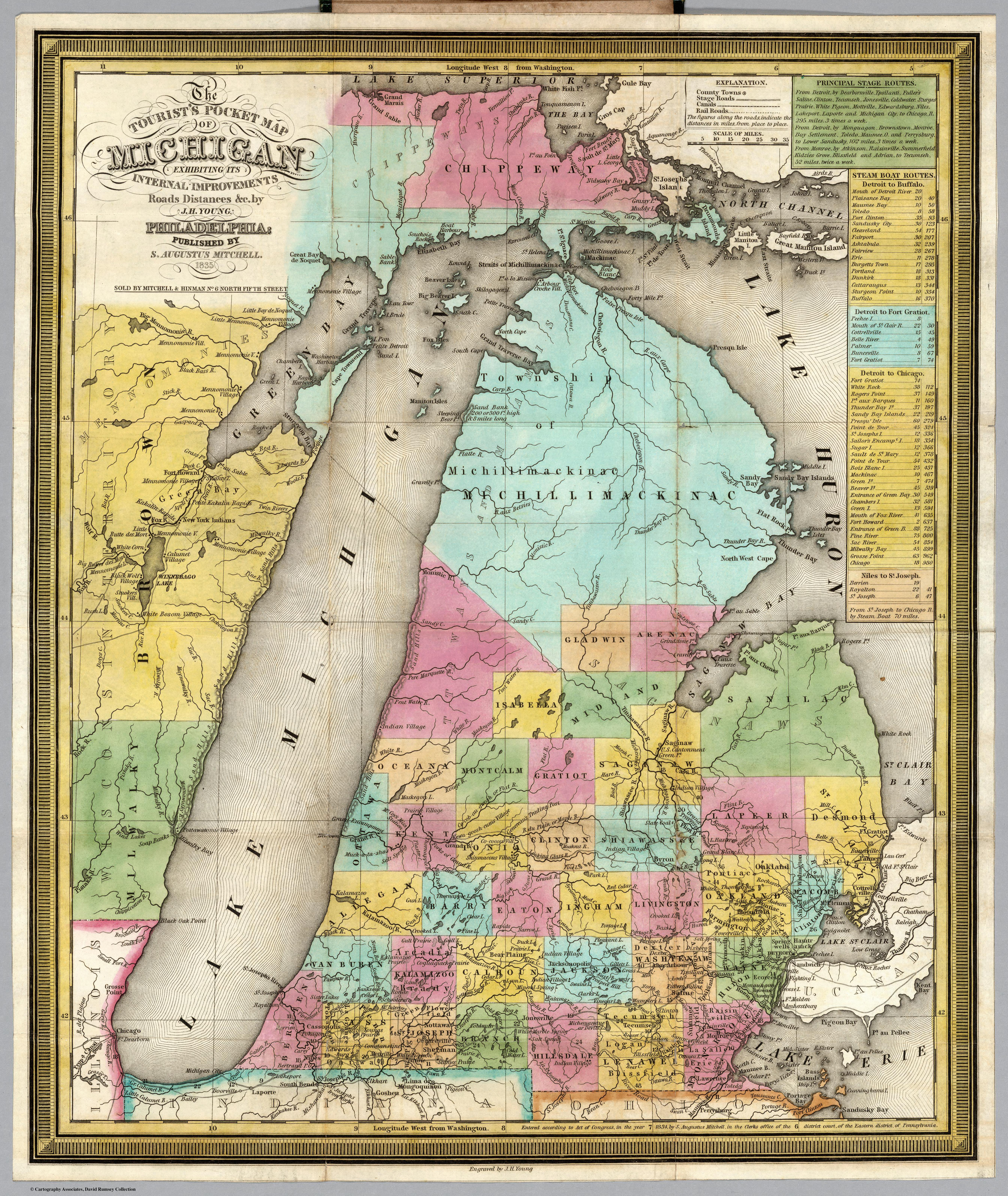
Lake Winnebago on the 1835 Tourist's Pocket Map of Michigan among the "Mennomonie" villages of Wisconsin Territory

== Gallery ==
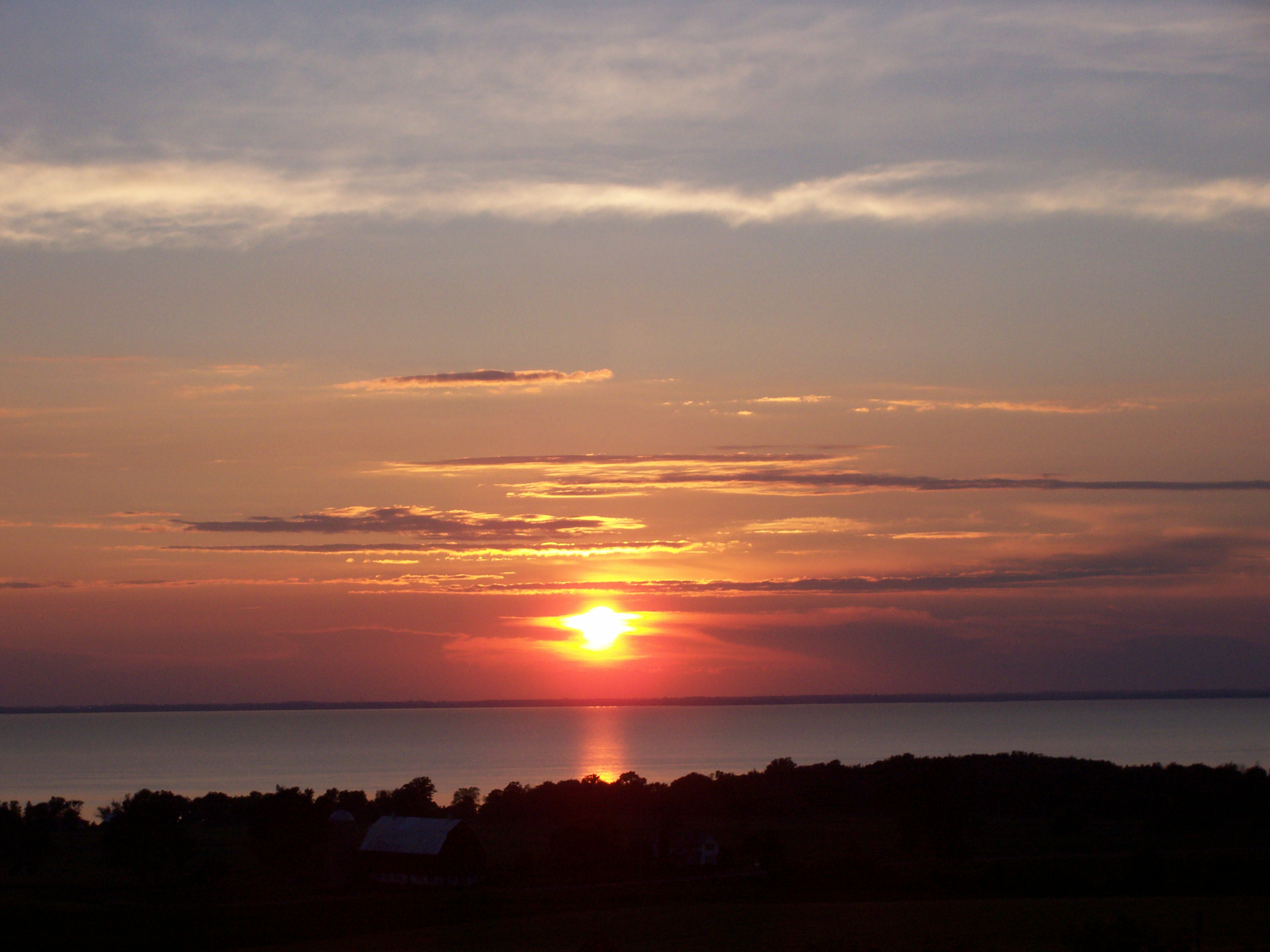
Sunset over Lake Winnebago, seen from the Niagara Escarpment on the East shore

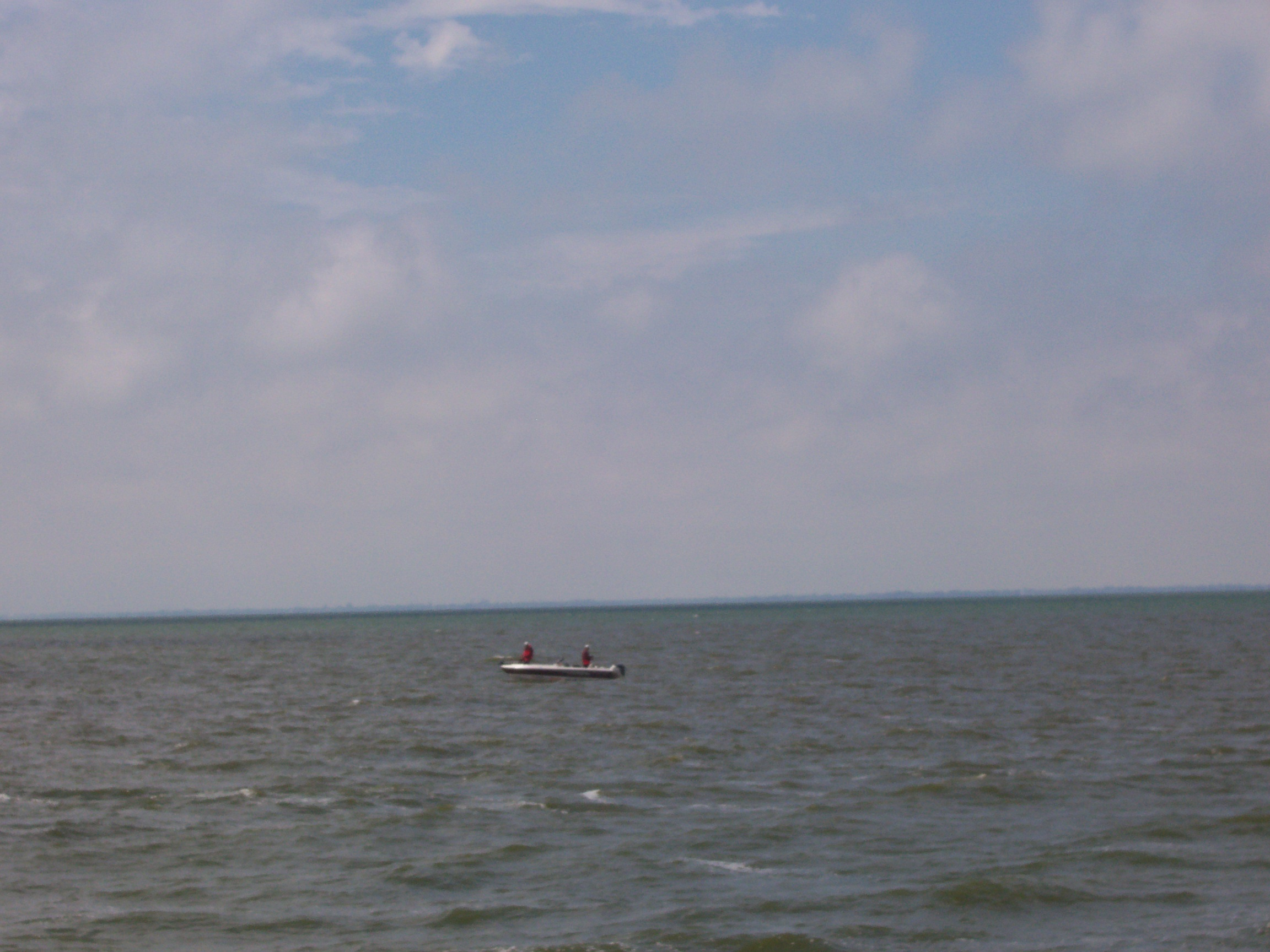
Fishing boat seen from the Stockbridge Harbor

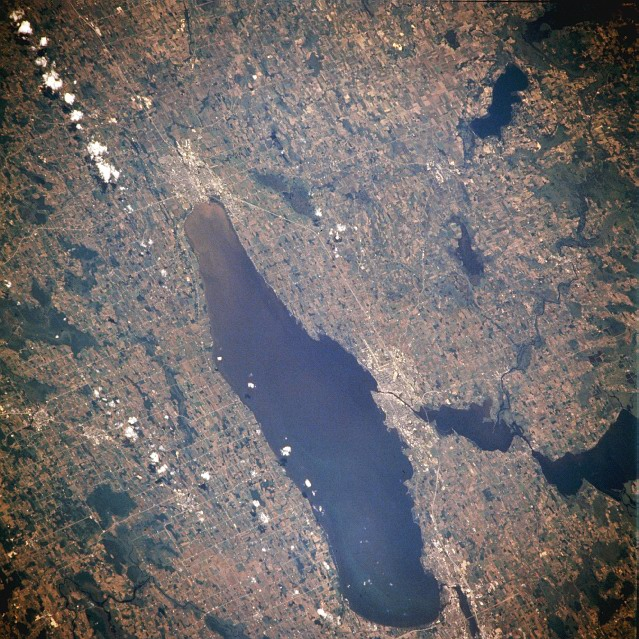
From space (July 1996). The string of clouds in the upper left of the image runs almost perfectly north–south, with north being at the bottom of the image.

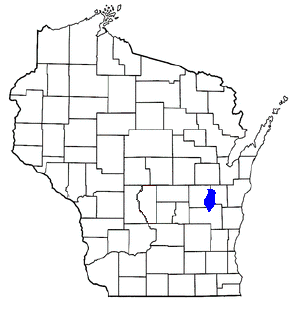
Location in Wisconsin

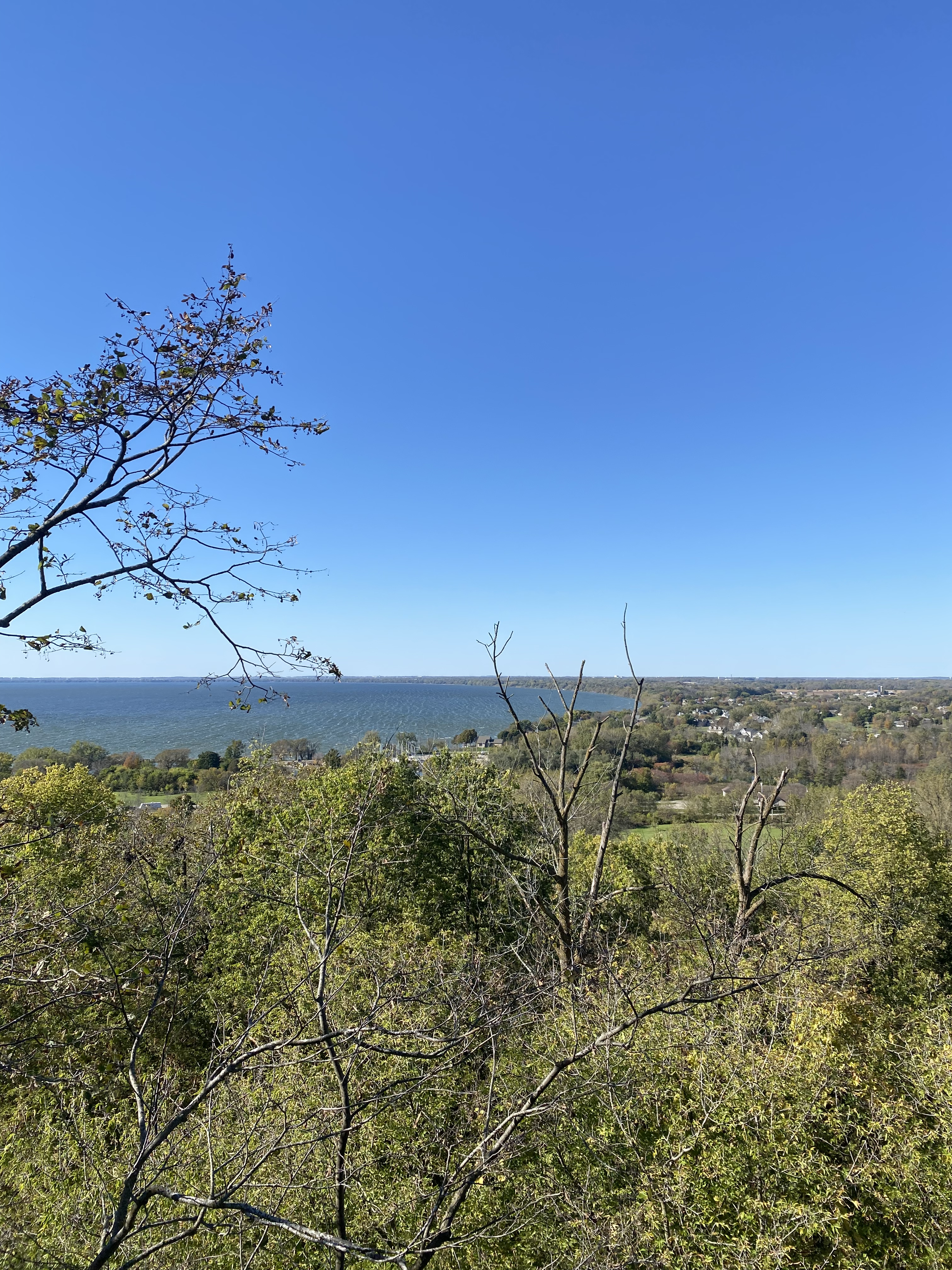
Lake Winnebago as seen from High Cliff State Park

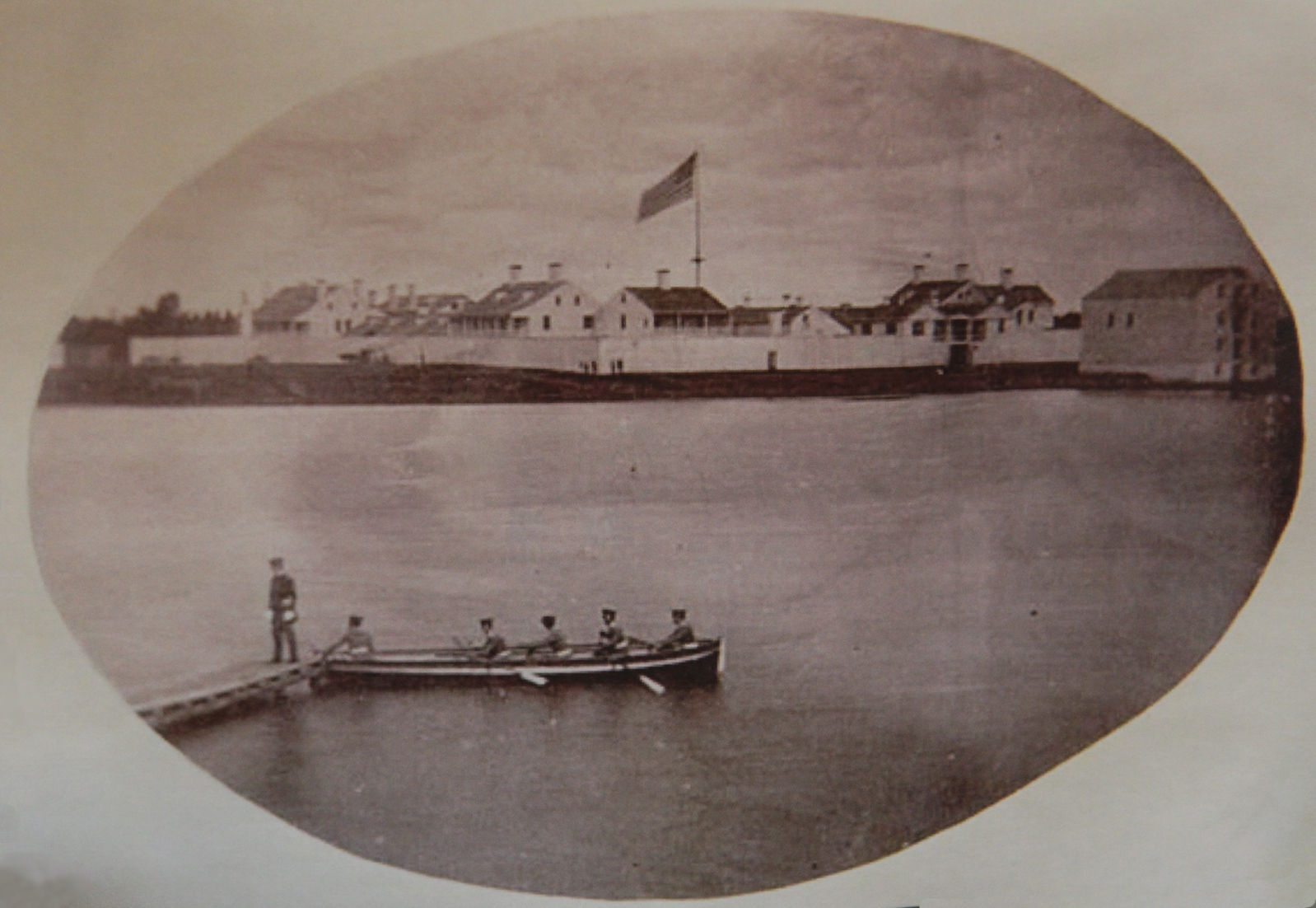
Fort Howard from the Fox River

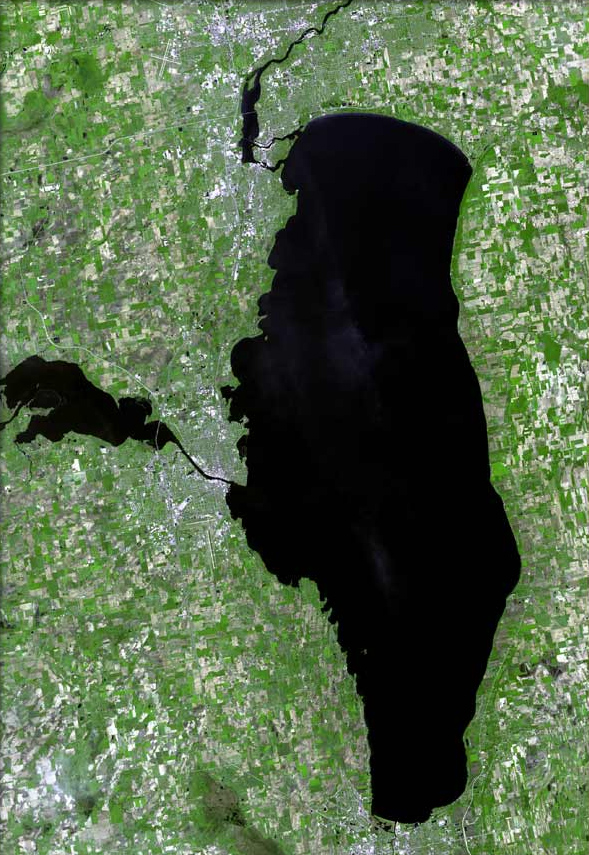
From space in 2006

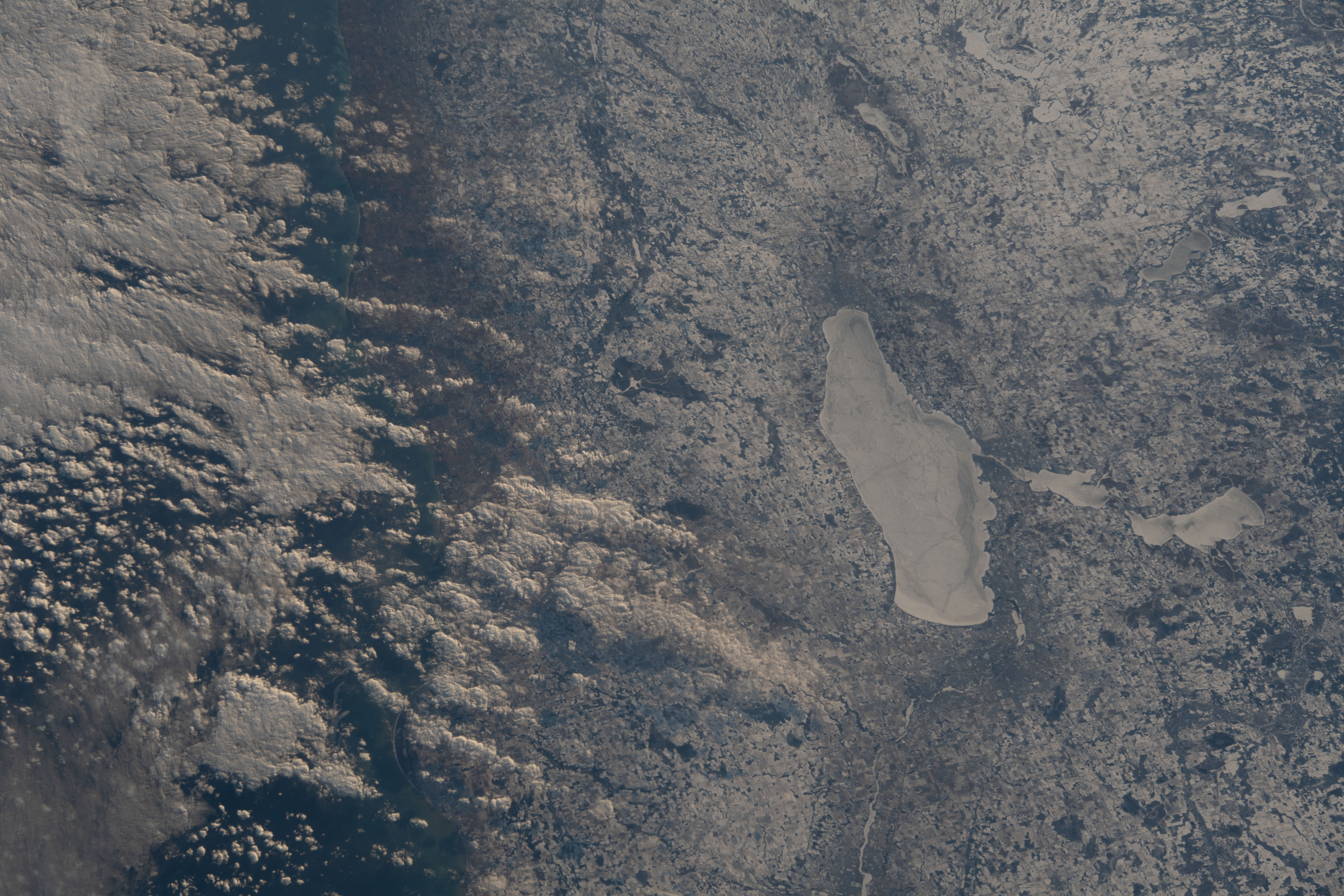
From the International Space Station on February 7, 2022

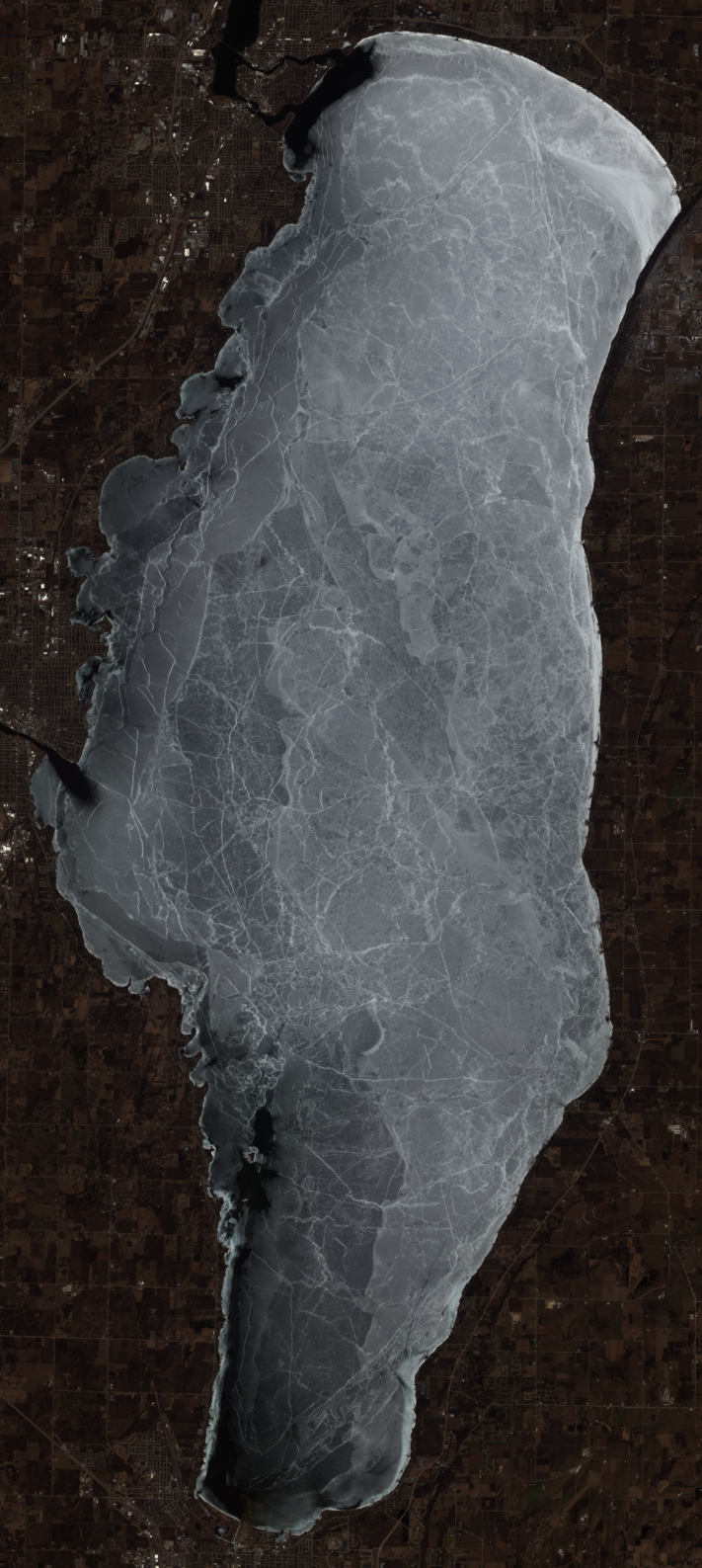
With Landsat 8 on March 20, 2022
