= Partridge Lake (Wisconsin) =

Lake in the state of Wisconsin, United States

- Location within Wisconsin Location within the United States
- Location: Waupaca County, Wisconsin
- Coordinates: 44.2763553°N 88.8904168°W
- Primary inflows: Walla Walla Creek, Little River
- River sources: Wolf River
- Basin countries: United States
- Surface area: 1,185 acres (1.852 sq mi; 4.80 km^{2})
- Max. depth: 4 ft (1.2 m)
- Shore length^{1}: 8.53 mi (13.73 km)
- Surface elevation: 742 feet (226 m)
- Settlements: Fremont
- ^{1} Shore length is not a well-defined measure.

Partridge Lake is a lake located in Waupaca County, Wisconsin. It has a surface area of 1,185 acres (1.852 sq mi; 4.80 km^{2}) and a maximum depth of 4 ft (1.2 m). The Wolf River is the primary source for the lake, with the Little River and the Walla Walla Creek also emptying into the lake. The village of Fremont lies on the south shore.

== See also ==
- List of lakes of Wisconsin
