= Fond du Lac River (Wisconsin) =

River in east central Wisconsin

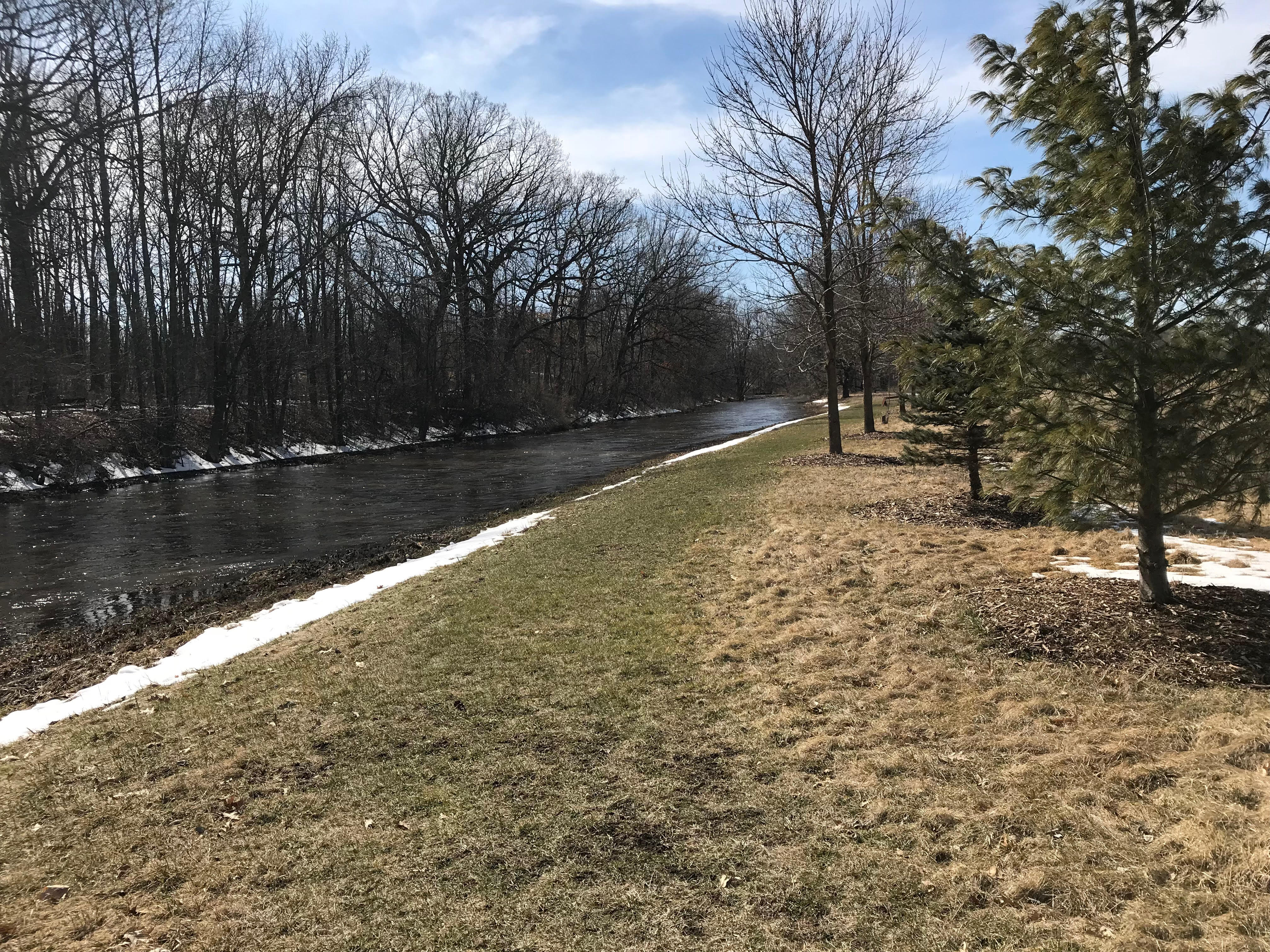
- The Fond du Lac River as it passes through the Town of Fond du Lac.

- Location within Wisconsin Location within the United States

Location
- Country: United States
- State: Wisconsin
- County: Fond du Lac

Physical characteristics
- Source
  - coordinates: 43.7811111°N 88.4580556°W
- Mouth: Lake Winnebago
  - location: City of Fond du Lac
  - coordinates: 43.8005443°N 88.4526073°W
  - elevation: 751 feet (229 m)

The Fond du Lac River is a river that flows through the city of Fond du Lac, Wisconsin into Lake Winnebago. The river starts near Rosendale, Lamartine and Eldorado, then flows around 10 miles east. The east and west branches come together in downtown Fond du Lac less than a mile before flowing into Lake Winnebago.

The Supple Marsh and Lakeside Park border the river as it flows into Lake Winnebago.

== 2019 Flooding ==
On March 13 and 14, the river flooded its banks in downtown Fond du Lac. The flooding was a result of ice jams under the main bridges that cross the river in the city. Evacuation efforts were put in place, as crews worked to remove the ice. Multiple state and local groups helped with the recovery.

== Other Misc. Flooding ==
In late February 2025, the city of Fond du Lac, Wisconsin faced elevated flood risk as warmer temperatures and rain began impacting the region’s thawing rivers. The rapid warming broke up river-ice coverage, raising the potential for ice jams along the Fond du Lac River and its branches.

== See also ==
- List of Wisconsin rivers
