= Butte des Morts =

Coordinates: 44°05′58″N 088°39′14″W

Butte Des Morts (in French, hill of the dead) is a region of northeastern Wisconsin, in Winnebago County, containing two known lakes: Little Lake Butte des Morts, and Lake Butte des Morts. Little Lake Butte des Morts lies between the Menasha region from the town of Menasha, while Big Lake Butte des Morts lies in the northwest side of the city of Oshkosh, Wisconsin.

== See also ==
- Butte des Morts, Wisconsin
