= Friendship State Trail =

Recreational trail in Wisconsin

Coordinates: 44°12′18″N 88°28′12″W

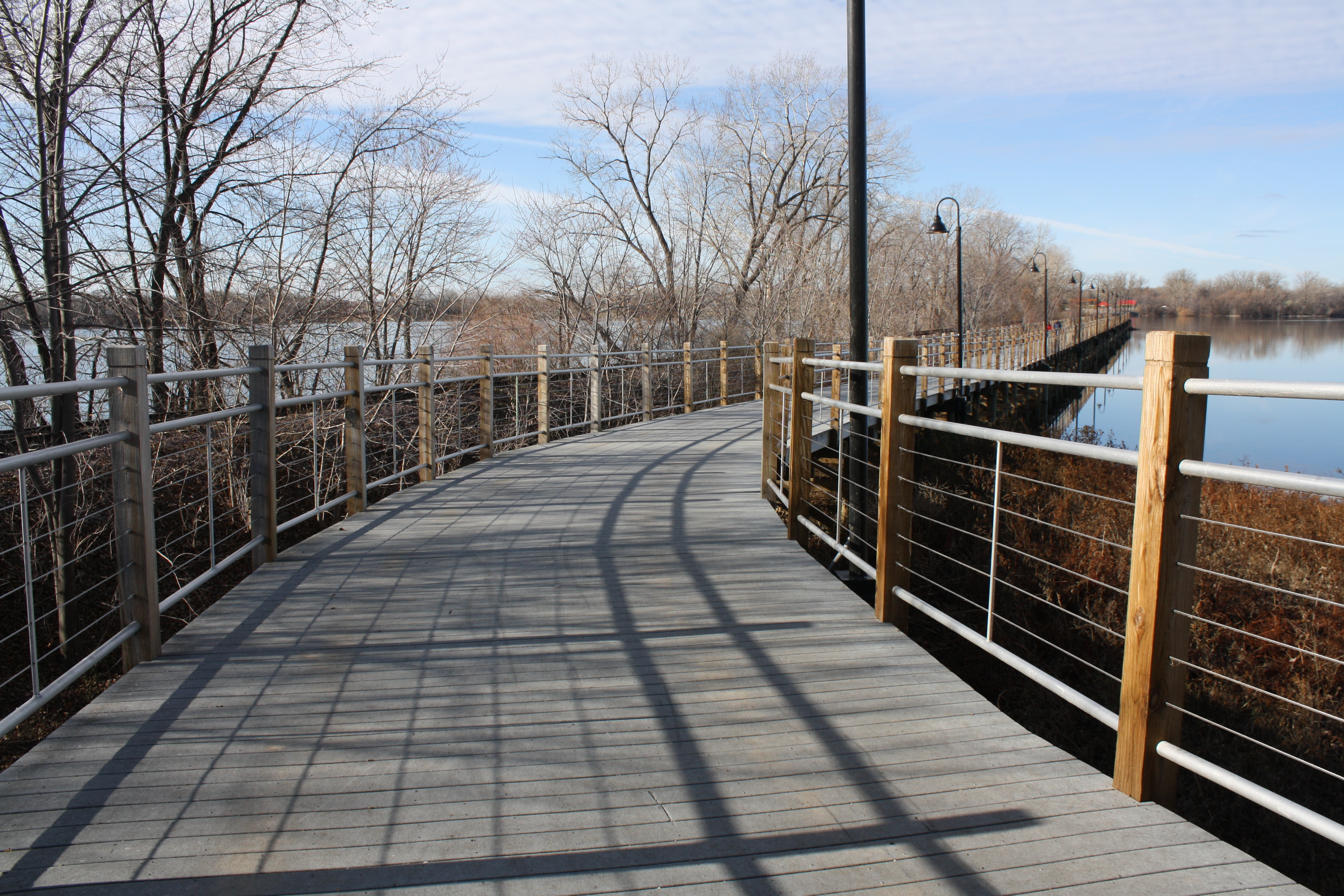
- The Friendship State Trail in Menasha, Wisconsin as it crosses the Fox River.
- Length: 18.4 mi (29.6 km)
- Location: Winnebago and Calumet County, Wisconsin
- Trailheads: Winchester to Fox Crossing; Fox River State Recreational Trail (Forest Junction) to Brillion
- Use: Cycling, Pedestrians, Hiking, Horse trail
- Season: Spring, Summer, Autumn
- Surface: Mainly asphalt and gravel
- Right of way: Partial rail trail

Trail map
- Map of Trail

The Friendship Trail is a recreation trail in northeastern Wisconsin. The trail is used by walkers, hikers, bikers, horseback riders, and snowmobilers during the winter months. Two sections of the trail are complete: ~14 miles from Winchester east to Fox Crossing and ~4.4 miles from Forest Junction southeast to Brillion. The route consists of asphalt, crushed stone, and wood surfaces. The entire route is located in Winnebago County and Calumet County.

== Route ==
=== Western leg ===
The Western trailhead is located at CTH-M in the town of Winchester about 1.5 miles (2.4 km) east of the US-45/US-10 interchange. The trail then continues along US Highway 10 for 8.6 miles (13.8 km). The trail continues through the Fox Cities for the remaining length, this is the busiest section of the trail. A trestle bridge crosses Little Lake Butte des Morts as a concurrency of the loop the lake trail, this is one of two rail trail sections on the trail. The final part of the trail travels along Wisconsin Highway 114 in Menasha. The Eastern trailhead is the intersection of US-10 and WIS-114.

The trail intersects the Wiouwash State Trail, which connects the cities of Hortonville and Oshkosh, in Clayton.

Communities along the route include: Winchester, Clayton, Fox Crossing, and Menasha.

=== Eastern leg ===
The eastern leg of the Friendship State Trail is maintained by Wisconsin Department of Natural Resources. The western trailhead is located at Fox River State Recreational Trail in southern Forest Junction. The Fox River Trail connects to Green Bay and Hilbert. The trail continues 4 miles southeast along US-10 to its terminus at the intersection of Center Rd. and Glenview Ave. in Brillion. This entire leg is rail trail and made of gravel.

== Access ==
The trail is open year-round, though it is not cleared of snow in winter. Walking and bicycling is permitted the entire length. Horseback riding is permitted from CTH-M to CTH-CB on the western leg and the entire eastern leg. Leashed dogs are also permitted. There is no fee to use the trail. There are several free public parking lots available for use along the trail.

== Future ==
Plans are in place to expand the trail westward to Stevens Point and connect the two legs together.
