= Menasha (town), Wisconsin =

Menasha, Wisconsin
- Town
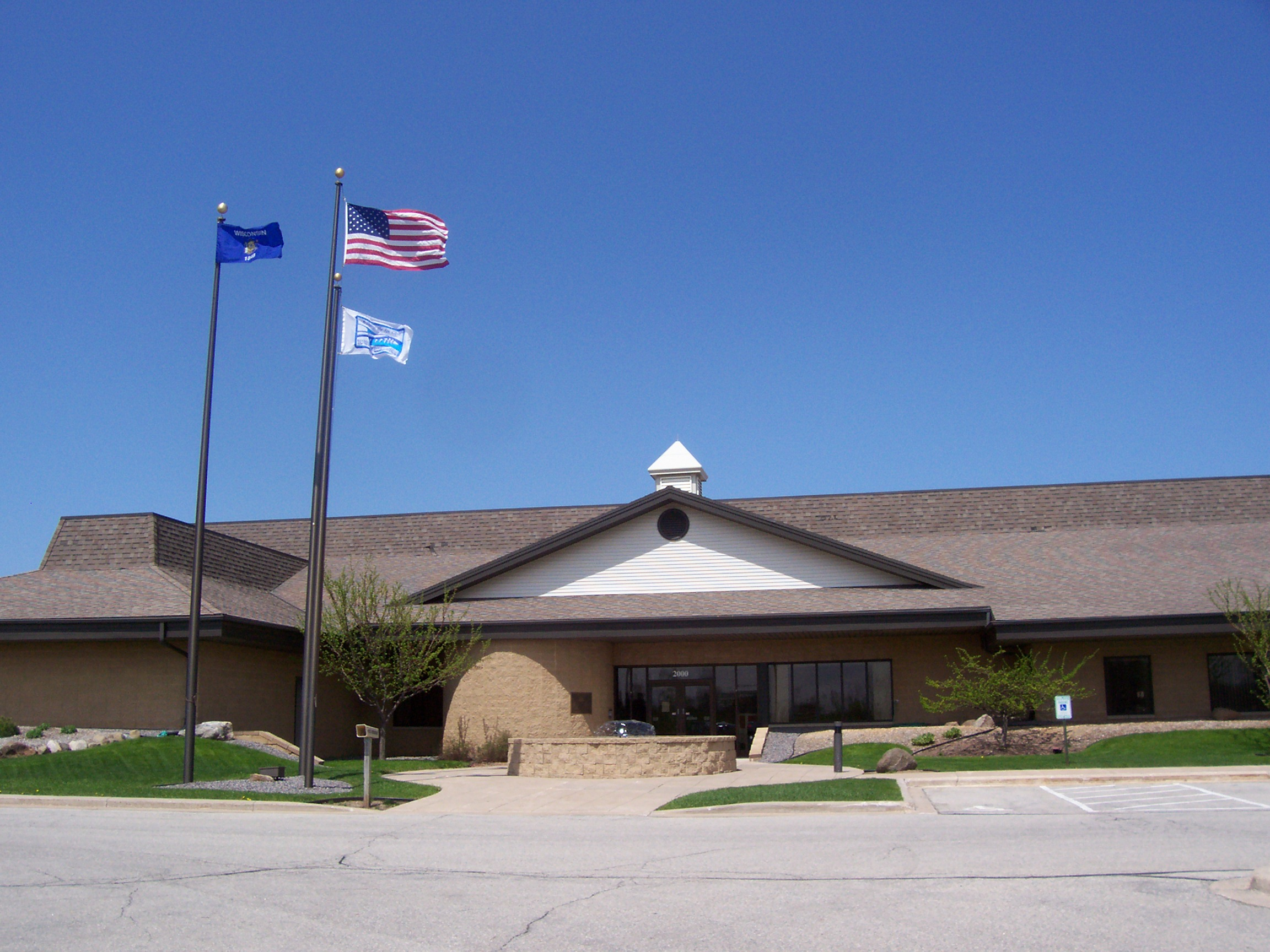
- Menasha Town Hall
- Motto: Bridging the Fox Cities
- Location within the state of Wisconsin
- Coordinates: 44°12′36″N 88°25′27″W
- Country: United States
- State: Wisconsin
- County: Winnebago
- Established: April 3, 1855
- Fully annexed: September 22, 2016

Area
  - Total: 13.9 sq mi (36.0 km^{2})
  - Land: 12.2 sq mi (31.5 km^{2})
  - Water: 1.7 sq mi (4.5 km^{2})

Population (2010)
  - Total: 18,498
  - Density: 1,521/sq mi (587.2/km^{2})
- Time zone: UTC-6 (Central (CST))
  - Summer (DST): UTC-5 (CDT)
- ZIP codes: 54915, 54952, 54956
- Area code: 920
- FIPS code: 55-50850
- Website: www.town-menasha.com

Menasha was a town in Winnebago County, Wisconsin, United States, west of the Fox River across from the city of Menasha. The population was 18,498 at the 2010 census, making it the second most populous town in the state of Wisconsin at the time of its dissolution. The unincorporated community of Waverly Beach was located partially in the town. In an April 2016 referendum, the portion of the town west of Little Lake Butte des Morts voted to become the village of Fox Crossing. The remaining portions of the town were annexed to Fox Crossing on September 22, 2016, effectively ending the existence of the town.

== History ==
The Town of Menasha was officially organized on April 3, 1855, in part from land formerly belonging to the neighboring town of Neenah.

=== Village incorporation ===
Discussion of the Town of Menasha being incorporated into a village began as early as 1979, when the name Bridgeview was proposed. A referendum on the matter was brought to residents in 2002 (again with the proposed village name of Bridgeview), which was defeated.

In December 2014, a petition was circulated to incorporate the west side of the town as the Village of Fox Crossing. It needed 50 signatures to file the petition in Winnebago County court; it had received over 200 by March 2015. Town leaders estimate that it would cost $85000 to incorporate and possibly $75000 in legal fees to defend against challenges. An incorporation committee suggested incorporating 10600 residents west of the Fox River followed later by annexing the 7900 residents east of the river.

Incorporation of Fox Crossing as a village, comprising the land west of Little Lake Butte des Morts became final on April 20, 2016. This roughly reduced the area of the Town of Menasha by half. The long term plan after this was finalized was to fold the remaining portions of the Town of Menasha into the new village, assuming there were no objections from remaining town residents.

On August 17, 2016, an agreement was reached between the Village of Fox Crossing and the remaining Town of Menasha to annex all remaining Town of Menasha lands to Fox Crossing. When completed, this would effectively end the existence of the Town of Menasha, on a timeline "on or as soon after the (agreement) as practical". There were no petitions filed by town residents objecting to this. On September 22, 2016, the Town of Menasha ceased when remaining parts of the town were annexed into Fox Crossing.

== Geography ==
The town was located in the northeastern corner of Winnebago County and partially surrounded the city of Menasha. It was located at the northern end of Lake Winnebago, the outlet of which, the Fox River, flowed through the middle of the town as Little Lake Butte des Morts. The city of Neenah bordered the town to the south, and the town of Clayton lay to the west. To the north and east was Outagamie County, with the city of Appleton to the northeast, and the towns of Grand Chute and Greenville to the north.

According to the United States Census Bureau, the town had a total area of 13.9 square miles (36.0 km^{2}), of which 12.2 square miles (31.5 km^{2}) was land and 1.7 square miles (4.5 km^{2}), or 12.50%, was water.

== Demographics ==
As of the census of 2000, there were 15,858 people, 6,298 households, and 4,320 families residing in the town. The population density was 1,277.9 people per square mile (493.4/km^{2}). There were 6,521 housing units at an average density of 525.5 per square mile (202.9/km^{2}). The racial makeup of the town was 95.44% White, 0.39% African American, 0.45% Native American, 1.66% Asian, 0.04% Pacific Islander, 1.19% from other races, and 0.83% from two or more races. Hispanic or Latino of any race were 3.11% of the population.

There were 6,298 households, out of which 31.4% had children under the age of 18 living with them, 58.6% were married couples living together, 7.0% had a female householder with no husband present, and 31.4% were non-families. 24.3% of all households were made up of individuals, and 6.4% had someone living alone who was 65 years of age or older. The average household size was 2.47 and the average family size was 2.98.

In the town the population was spread out, with 24.2% under the age of 18, 9.1% from 18 to 24, 31.0% from 25 to 44, 24.6% from 45 to 64, and 11.0% who were 65 years of age or older. The median age was 37 years. For every 100 females, there were 99.6 males. For every 100 females age 18 and over, there were 97.7 males.

The median income for a household in the town was $50,887, and the median income for a family was $60,097. Males had a median income of $41,093 versus $27,313 for females. The per capita income for the town was $24,393. About 3.3% of families and 4.4% of the population were below the poverty line, including 5.0% of those under age 18 and 3.1% of those age 65 or over.

== Notable people ==
- William P. Grimes, businessman, farmer, and politician, lived in the town; Grimes served as chairman of the town board.
- Helen F. Thompson, businesswoman, teacher, and politician, was born in the town.
- Esther K. Walling, businesswoman and politician. lived in the town; Walling served as chair of the town board.

== Gallery ==
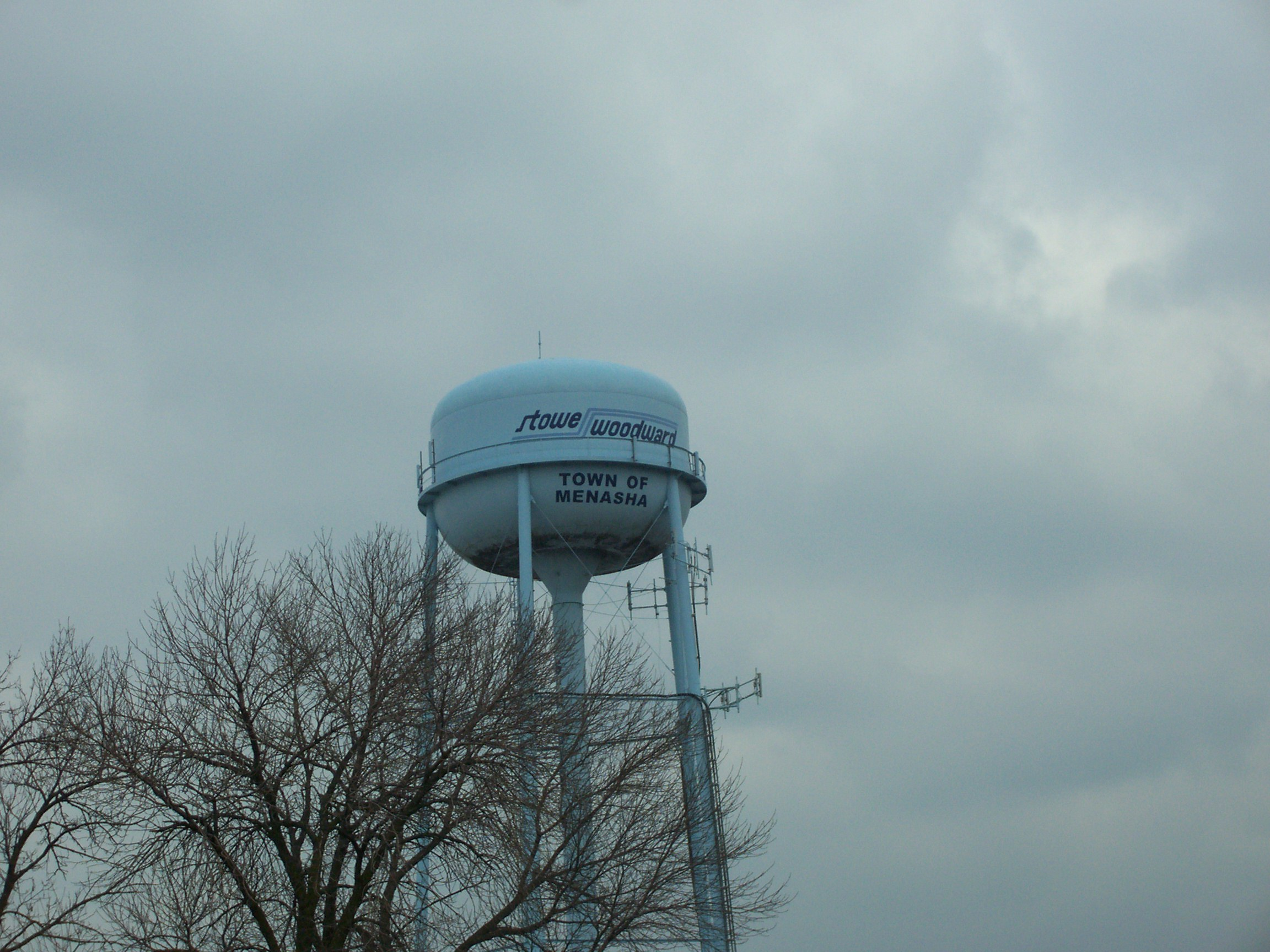
Watertower

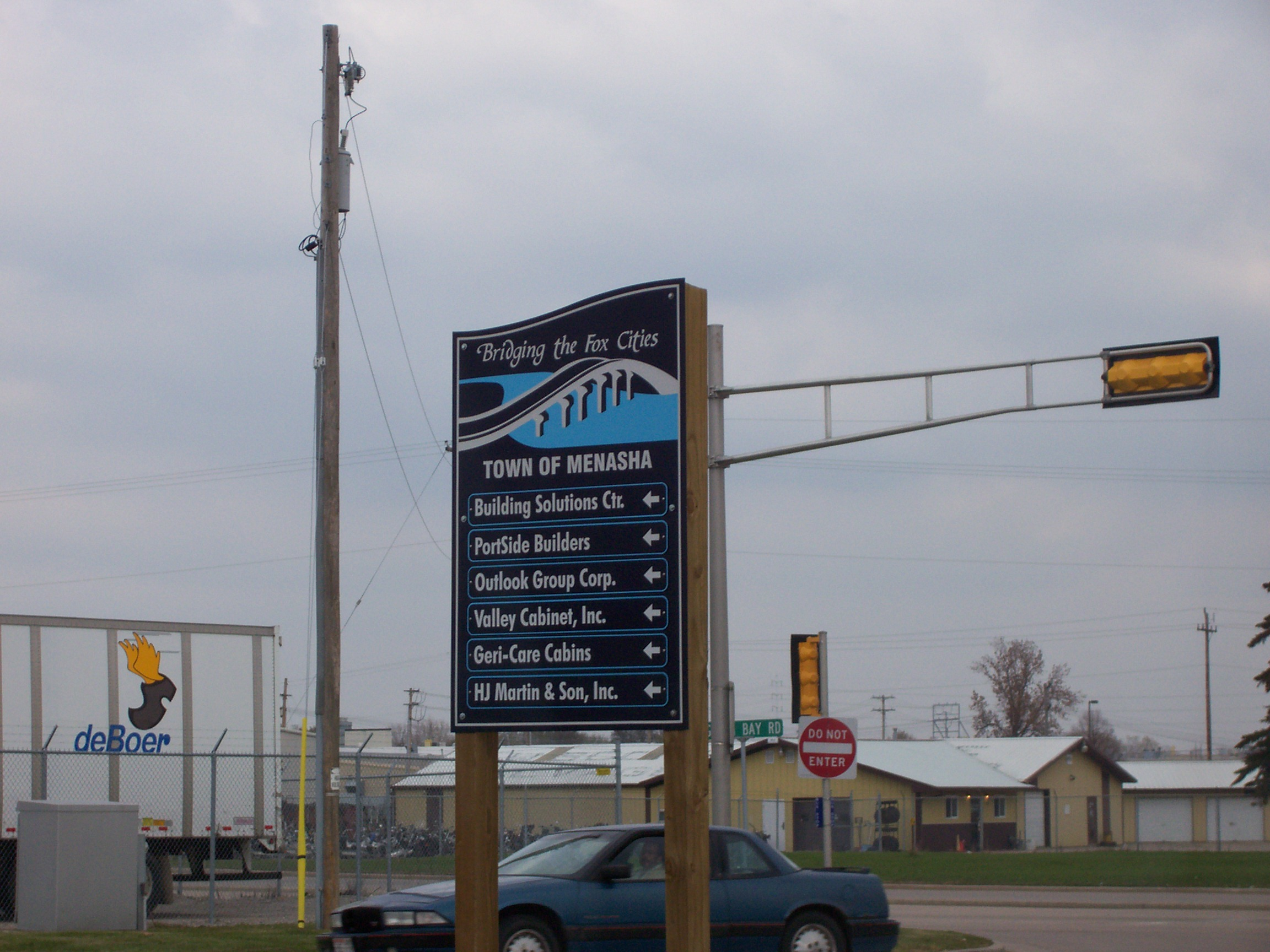
Road sign

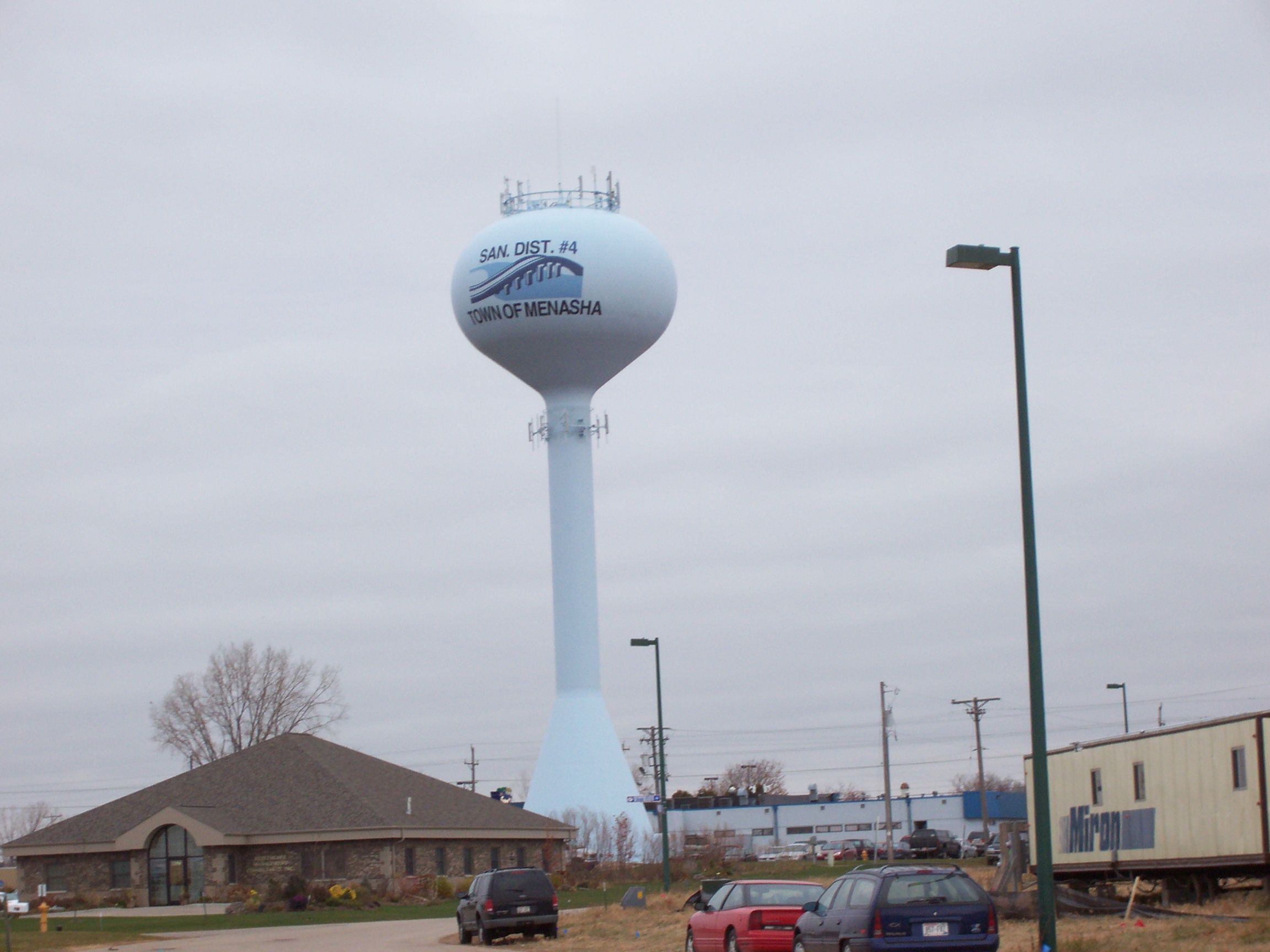
Watertower near University of Wisconsin-Fox Valley
