= Waverly Beach, Wisconsin =

- Unincorporated community
- Location within Wisconsin Location within the United States
- Coordinates: 44°12′37″N 88°24′16″W
- Country: United States
- State: Wisconsin
- Counties: Calumet, Winnebago
- Towns: Harrison, Menasha
- Elevation: 751 ft (229 m)
- Time zone: UTC-6 (Central (CST))
  - Summer (DST): UTC-5 (CDT)
- Area code: 920
- GNIS feature ID: 1576340

Waverly Beach is an unincorporated community in the Town of Harrison, Calumet County and Fox Crossing, Winnebago County, Wisconsin, United States. The Calumet County portion of Waverly Beach is located on the north shore of Lake Winnebago along U.S. Route 10 and the Canadian National Railway, 3.6 miles (5.8 km) south of downtown Appleton.
