= Fox River Trail =

Fox River Trail could refer to two different recreational trails in the United States:

- Fox River Trail (Illinois), in Kane County, Illinois
- Fox River State Recreational Trail, in Brown County, Wisconsin
