= Larson Brothers Airport =

- U.S. National Register of Historic Places
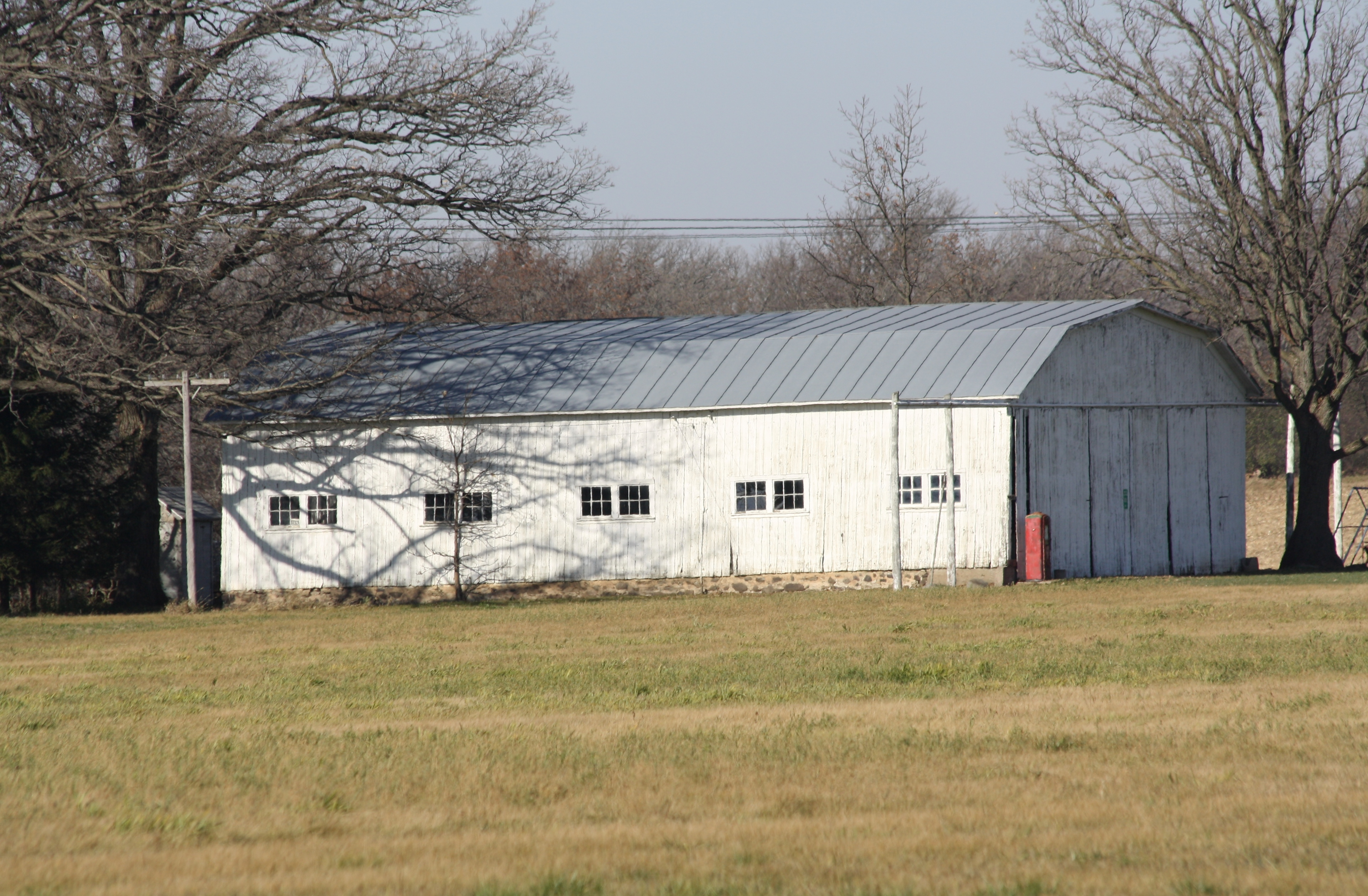
- Hangar in 2010

- Location within Wisconsin Location within the United States
- Location: County II; Clayton, Winnebago County, Wisconsin
- Area: 38 acres (15 ha)
- Built: 1922
- Architect: Knute Johnson
- NRHP reference No.: 84003825
- Added to NRHP: April 5, 1984

The Larson Brothers Airport is an airport in rural Winnebago County, Wisconsin, United States (near Larsen, Wisconsin) along the former Wisconsin Highway 150 (now County II). It was the first airport in the county and one of the first in the state outside of Milwaukee. It is listed on the National Register of Historic Places.

== History ==
The airport operated from 1922, three years after the state's first airport opened in Milwaukee, until 1990. It was formed when Clarence, Leonard, Newell, and Roy Larson cleared an 80 rod-long sod landing strip behind their barn. He had two Curtiss Canuck airplanes. They began barnstorming the United States at county fairs and offering flying lessons before building a hangar in 1924. Roy Larson barnstormed Wisconsin for Bob La Follette's 1924 Presidential campaign. The hangar allowed them to work and store on six airplanes.

In 1926, the brothers formed the Roy Larson Aircraft Company for their repair work, and created a corporation for all of their ventures as the Wisconsin Airways in the following year. Roy Larson died in 1929 while a student was flying the airplane that he was riding in.

In 1932, the Milwaukee Journal called the airport the "finest airport in the state". Soon after, sod airports began fading as more powerful airplanes required longer paved runways. It temporarily closed following a federal mandate at the beginning of World War II.

Leonard Larson trained fighter pilots for the war.

By the late 1970s, it was the oldest airport in the state.

== Historic site ==
The airport was added to the National Register of Historic Places on April 5, 1984. A historic marker was unveiled along Wisconsin Highway 150 on September 29, 1985 describing the history of the airport. The National Register uses the airport's design as an example of an airport included because of its design/construction: "The Larsen Brothers Airport in Clayton, Winnebago County, Wisconsin, represents one of the earliest forms of airport design in the State. Builder Knute Johnson adapted barn-building technology to construct the hangar in 1924."

== Images ==
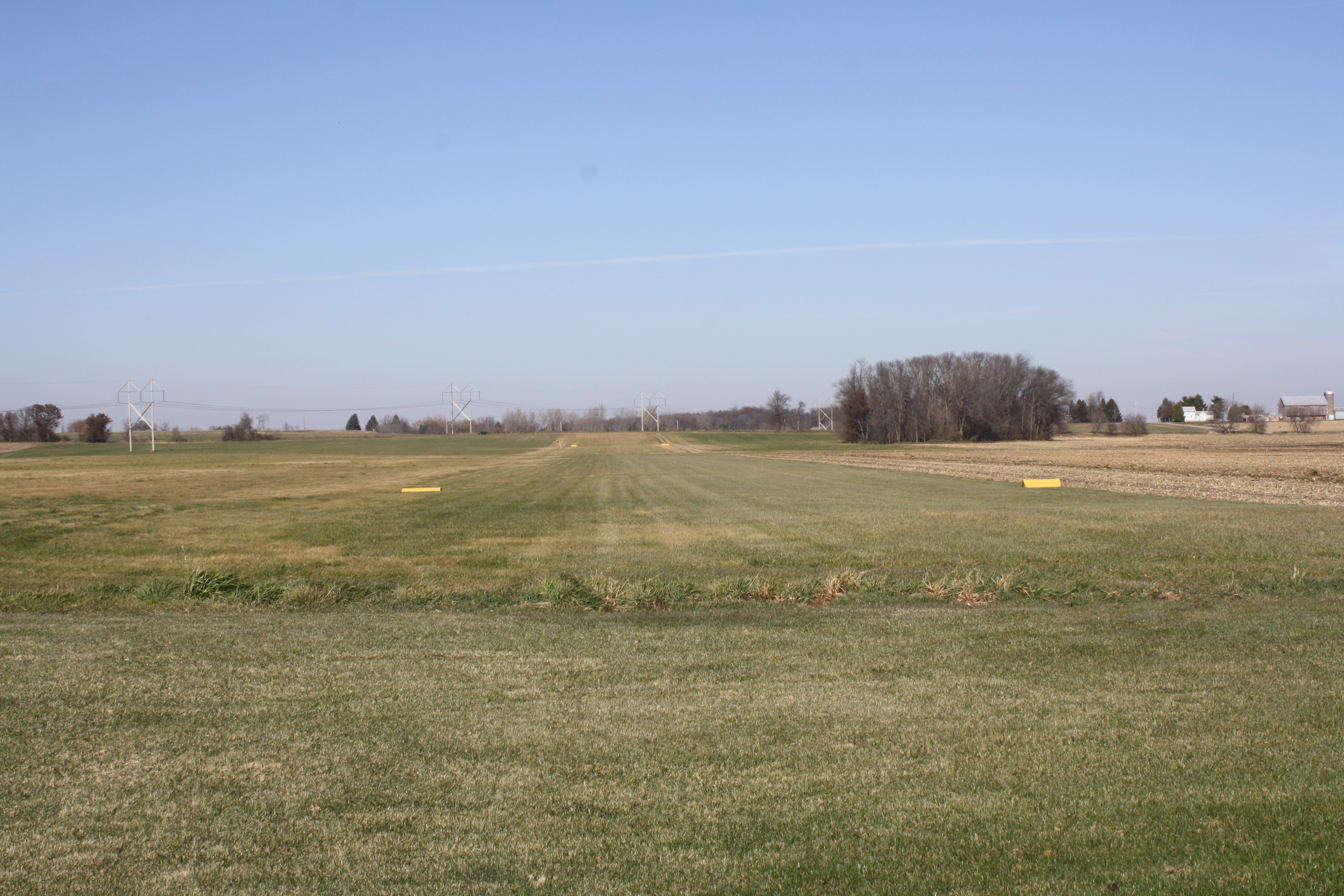
Landing strip

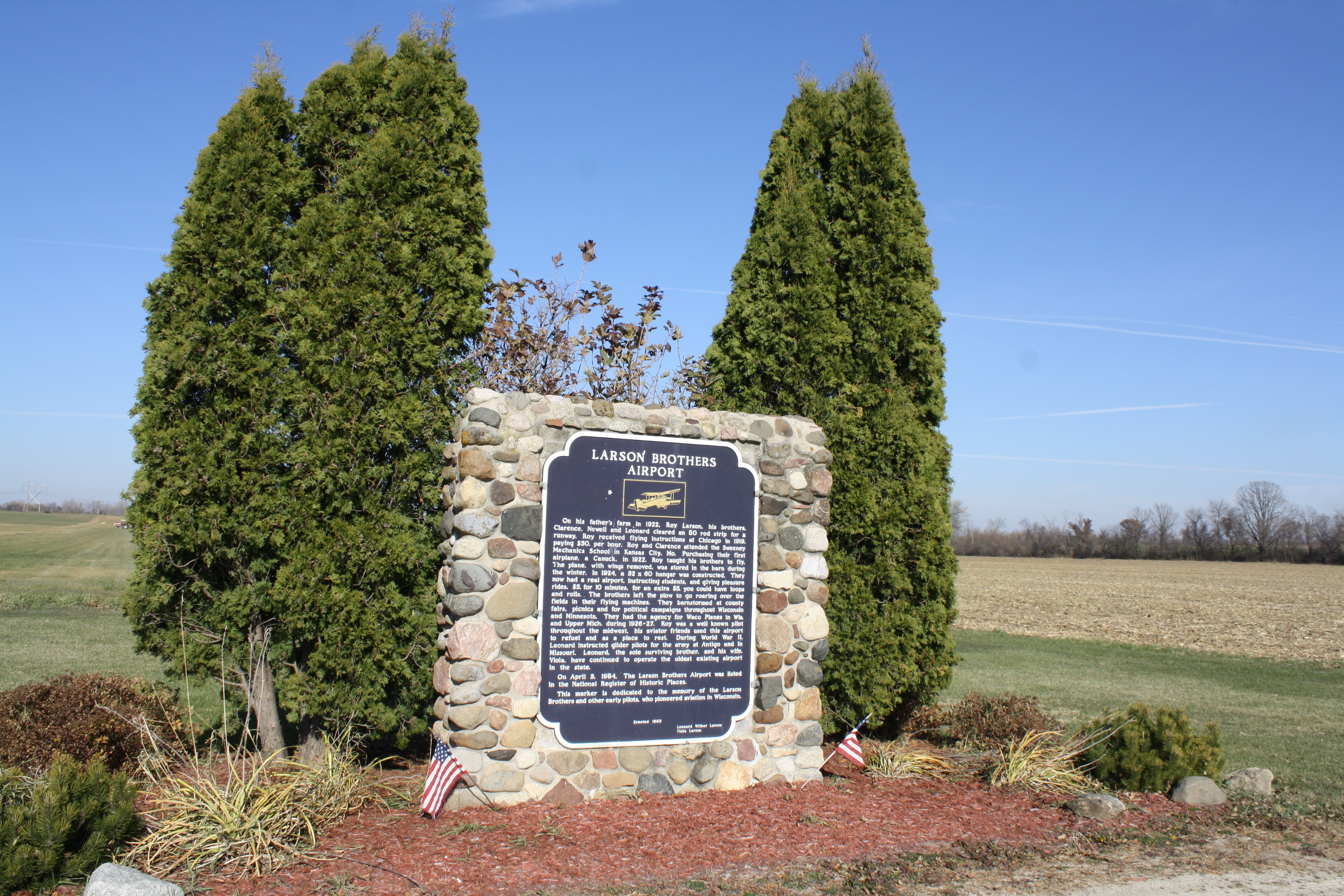
Historic marker
