= Joseph Marin de la Malgue =

Marine officer

Joseph Marin de la Malgue (February 1719 – 1774) was the son of Charles-Paul Marin de la Malgue and continued on in the family military and exploration tradition, entering the colonial regular troops at the age of 13. He spent the next 13 years in what is now Michigan and Wisconsin including the Michilimackinac area, west of Baie-des-Puants. He was mostly based out of the Baie-des-Puants post, learned the fur trade and became fluent in a number of Native American dialects.

In 1745, after being engaged in the Siege of Annapolis Royal (1745), Marin was recalled to fight the British at the Siege of Louisbourg (1745). En route he was delayed by the Naval battle off Tatamagouche. During that period, he married the daughter of Joseph de Fleury de La Gorgendière. His remaining military career was illustrious ending only with his capture near Fort Niagara and deportation to France by way of England . He attempted to return to the fight aboard the François-Louis in 1762, but the ship was captured by the British and, again, he was returned to France.

After a number of unhappy years in France, Marin was appointed lieutenant-colonel as part of a force headed to Madagascar to start a French colony. He died of fever shortly after his arrival on the island in 1774.

He had been an integral part of the military forces during his North American career and also a very successful trader and explorer. He was awarded the Cross of Saint Louis in 1761 as a recognition of the military efforts.
