= Wisconsin Highway 441 =

Highway in Wisconsin

State Trunk Highway 441
- Tri-County Expressway
- WIS 441 highlighted in red

Route information
- Maintained by WisDOT
- Length: 10.88 mi (17.51 km)
- Existed: 1975–present

Major junctions
- South end: I-41 / US 10 / US 41 in Fox Crossing
- US 10 in Appleton
- North end: I-41 / US 41 in Appleton

Location
- Country: United States
- State: Wisconsin
- Counties: Winnebago, Calumet, Outagamie

Highway system
- Wisconsin State Trunk Highway System; Interstate; US; State; Scenic; Rustic
| ← WIS 341 | → I-535 |

State Trunk Highway 441, and also called the Tri-County Expressway or Highway 441 (STH-441, or WIS 441) is a state highway in the US state of Wisconsin. Together with Interstate 41/US Highway 41 (I-41/US 41), the highway forms a beltway around the greater Appleton area, and is a freeway for the entire length of its route. It connects at both ends to its parent highway, I-41/US 41. It runs east–west and north–south in east central Wisconsin from near Neenah around Appleton to near Little Chute through Winnebago, Outagamie and Calumet counties. The Roland Kampo Memorial Bridge spans Little Lake Butte des Morts near the highway's southwest terminus.

== History ==
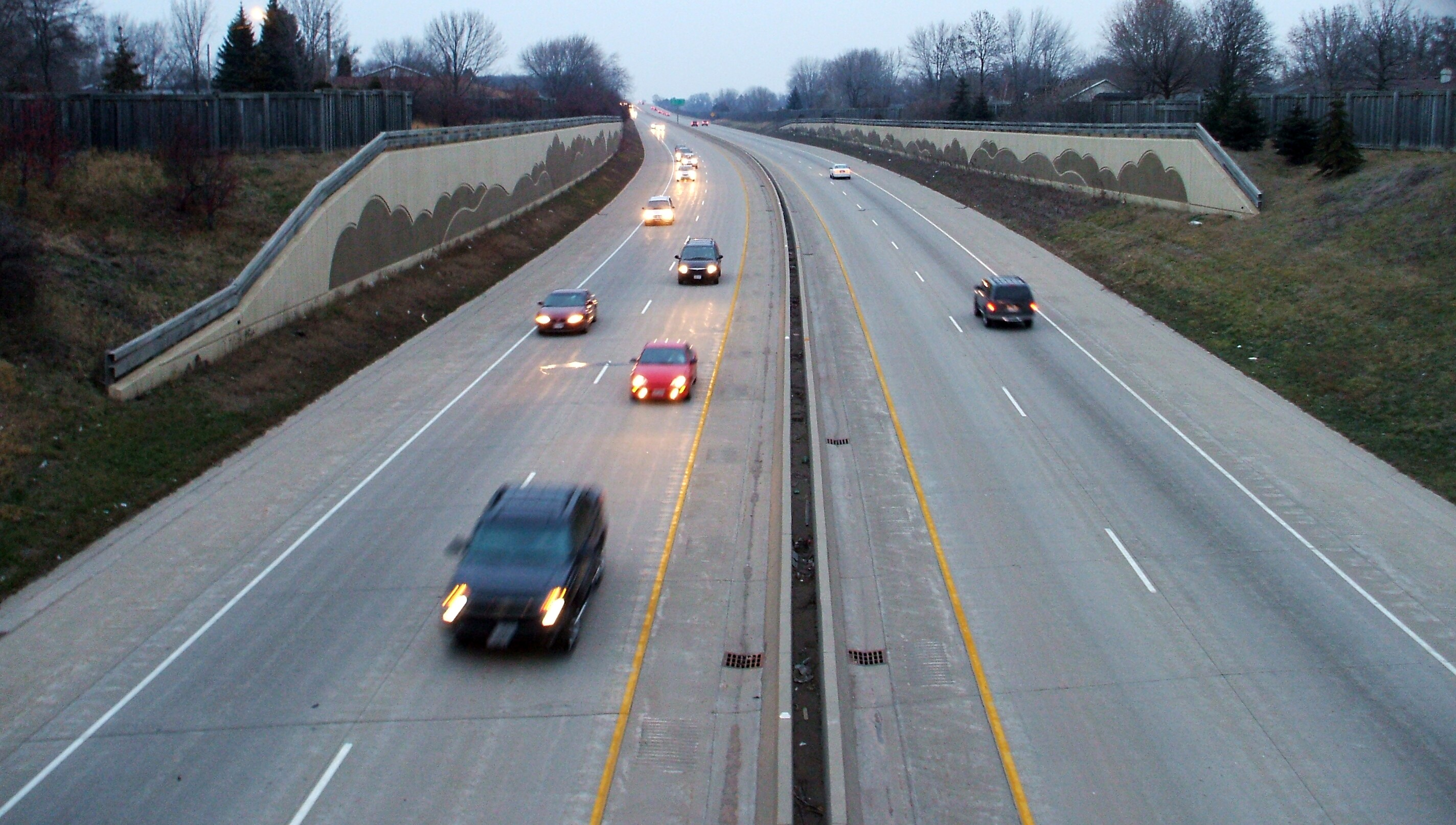
WIS 441 at Newberry Street, Appleton

The Roland Kampo Memorial Bridge was the first portion of this road completed; traffic began flowing on the bridge at 11 a.m. on November 30, 1975. The bridge, designated County Trunk Highway Q (CTH-Q) for its first years, extended from US 41 to CTH-P (Racine Road), approximately 1.3 miles (2.1 km). The bridge was also the last portion of the Tri-County Expressway completed for more than a decade, with the remainder of the expressway mired in the proposal stage. The exits on the portion not concurrent with US 10 were unsigned until 2019, when the mileage posts and exits east of Oneida Street to the east end I-41 interchange were numbered to reflect WIS 441's mileage.

The bridge was given a state highway designation (WIS 441) in the 1980s, with signs installed circa 1986. Movement to complete the full 10.88 miles (17.51 km) of freeway began in the late 1980s, and the first new stretch of freeway since 1975 was completed in November 1991, extending from CTH-P to US 10 (Oneida Street). The entire freeway length was completed in September 1993.

Between 2012 and 2019, the Wisconsin Department of Transportation (WisDOT) worked to a widen WIS 441 from east of I-41 to west of Calumet Street from four to six lanes along with changes to interchanges along the section. A large part of the work was completing the road's southeast interchange with I-41 (Mike Ellis Interchange) by restoring missing ramps, adding auxiliary lanes to I-41, and widening the Kampo Memorial Bridge. Property was also acquired to allow the smoothing of two sharp curves from the Kampo Bridge to north of Midway Road. As part of the project, the existing interchange with Oneida Street was converted to a diverging diamond interchange, the first in northern Wisconsin. Another project to replace the structural approaches of 13 bridges between I-41/US 10 and South Oneida Street will be undertaken in 2025.

== Exit list ==
| County | Location | mi | km | Exit | Destinations | Notes |
|---|---|---|---|---|---|---|
| Winnebago | Fox Crossing | 0.0 | 0.0 | 287 | US 10 west – Stevens Point; I-41 / US 41 – Milwaukee, Green Bay | Western end of US 10 concurrency; freeway uses US 10 mileposts and exit numbers; Mike Ellis Interchange |
| Winnebago | Fox Crossing | | | Roland Kampo Memorial Bridge over Little Lake Butte des Morts | | |
| Winnebago | Menasha | 1.3 | 2.1 | 289A | CTH-P (Racine Street) | |
| Winnebago | Menasha | 2.2 | 3.5 | 289B | CTH-AP (Midway Road) | |
| Winnebago | Menasha | 3.2 | 5.1 | 290 | WIS 47 (Appleton Road) | |
| Calumet | Menasha | 4.2 | 6.8 | 291 | US 10 east (Oneida Street) | Eastern end of US 10 concurrency; diverging diamond interchange |
| Outagamie | Appleton | 7.1 | 11.4 | 7 | CTH-KK (Calumet Street) | |
| Outagamie | Kimberly | 8.1 | 13.0 | 8 | CTH-CE (College Avenue) | |
| Outagamie | Appleton | 10.1 | 16.3 | 10 | CTH-OO (Northland Avenue) | |
| Outagamie | Appleton | 10.7 | 17.2 | 11 | I-41 / US 41 – Green Bay, Milwaukee | Signed as exits 11A (south) and 11B (north) |
1.000 mi = 1.609 km; 1.000 km = 0.621 mi: Concurrency terminus
