= Wisconsin Highway 150 =

State highway in Wisconsin, United States

State Trunk Highway 150

Route information
- Maintained by WisDOT
- Length: 6.6 mi (10.6 km)
- Existed: 1923–2003

Major junctions
- West end: WIS 110 near Winchester
- East end: US 45

Location
- Country: United States
- State: Wisconsin

Highway system
- Wisconsin State Trunk Highway System; Interstate; US; State; Scenic; Rustic
← WIS 149	→ US 151

State Trunk Highway 150 (often called Highway 150, STH-150 or WIS 150) was a state highway in the U.S. state of Wisconsin. It ran east–west between Winchester and Neenah. In 2003, the road was turned over to Winnebago County, which now maintains it as County Trunk Highway II (CTH-II).

== History ==
Initially, in 1923, WIS 150 was formed to travel along modern-day CTH-II, CTH-O, and Main Street from WIS 95 (later US 110, then WIS 110, then US 45, now CTH-M) in Winchester to WIS 15 (later US 41) in Neenah. Later, part of the route near Neenah moved north off from CTH-O, following more part of modern-day CTH-II and Lake Street.

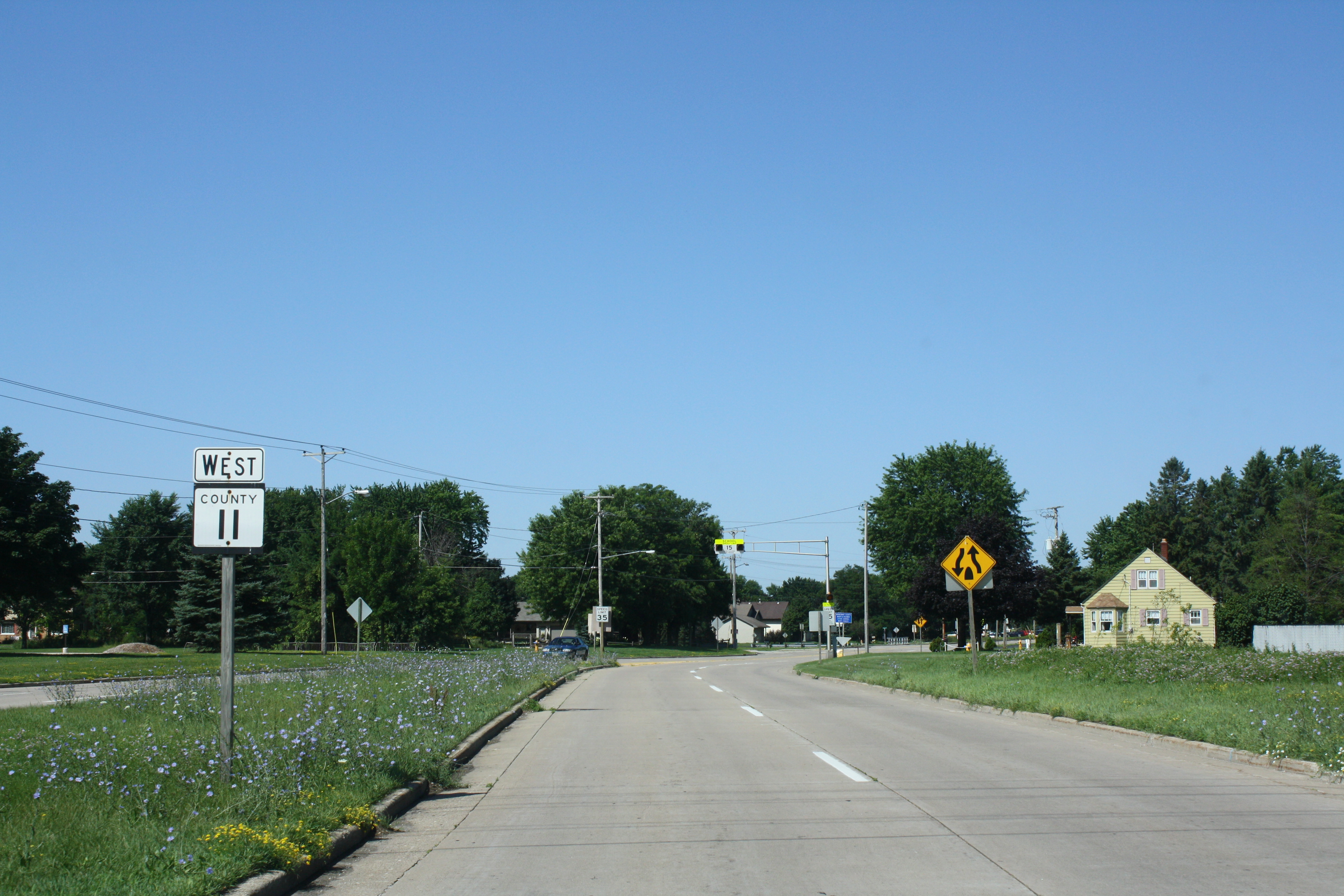
Near WIS 150's pre-1999 eastern terminus in 2011, now CTH-II

After US 41 bypassed downtown Appleton, Neenah, and Menasha in 1938, a part of WIS 150 on Lake Street was rerouted westward onto US 41 (Green Bay Road). In 1959, US 41 between Neenah and US 10 (now WIS 96) was moved onto a new limited-access highway. In 1975, US 41 from WIS 110 in Oshkosh to US 10 in Appleton was upgraded to interstate standard. However, in that same year, WIS 150 no longer served downtown Neenah. Instead, WIS 150 ended at the US 41/Winchester Road interchange. In 1994, WIS 150 was extended slightly west due to WIS 110's Winchester bypass. In 2000, WIS 150 was removed east of US 45 (now WIS 76) in favor of CTH-II and the proposed US 10 expressway. In 2003, WIS 150 was decommissioned after the US 10 expressway was completed and became part of CTH-II's western extension.

== Major intersections ==
The entire route is in Winnebago County.

Location	mi	km	Destinations	Notes
Town of Winchester			WIS 110	Western terminus of WIS 150; now US 45
Town of Clayton			US 45	Eastern terminus of WIS 150; now WIS 76
1.000 mi = 1.609 km; 1.000 km = 0.621 mi
