= Life of the River =

Life of the River is a public sculpture walk along the Fox River on downtown Green Bay's section of the Fox River State Recreational Trail. It is a privately funded public art initiative administered by the Green Bay Neighborhood Leadership Council and the City of Green Bay.

== Public art ==
Artwork	Image	Date	Artist
River Monolith; 44.511944°N 88.019167°W		2009	Andy Kincaid & Rob Neilson
Currents; 44.511667°N 88.019167°W		2008	Don Lawler
