= CityDeck =

- CityDeck Logo

- Location within Wisconsin
- Interactive map of CityDeck
- Location: Green Bay, Wisconsin
- Coordinates: 44°30′58″N 88°00′58″W
- Area: 2.5 acres (1.0 ha)
- Created: 2012
- Designer: Stoss Landscape Urbanism
- Awards: Azure magazine's AZ Award: Best Landscape Architecture (2014); Boston Society of Landscape Architecture: Honor Award in Waterfront Design (2013); Waterfront Center Excellence On The Waterfront Awards: Top Honor Award (2011)

The CityDeck is a riverfront boardwalk/promenade along the edge of the Fox River in downtown Green Bay, Wisconsin. It is about one-quarter-mile in length and situated between the Walnut Street bridge and the Ray Nitschke Memorial Bridge with multiple platforms extending out over the Fox River. There is 720 lineal feet of dock space amongst the platforms. It operates as a City park but also a key part of the Fox River State Recreational Trail. It was designed by Boston landscape architects Stoss Landscape Urbanism.

== Platforms ==
=== Shopko Landing ===
Shopko Landing is located next to the Ray Nitschke Memorial Bridge at the foot of Admiral Flatley Court. This area is 2,500 square feet and extends 30 feet over the water. It serves as a fishing pier with 174 feet of fishing locations along its perimeter.

=== The Main Stage ===
The Main Stage falls near the middle of the CityDeck in line with Pine Street. It is 3,500 square feet with bleacher-style seating and 5 tiered rows and theatrical lighting.

=== Cherry Street Landing ===
Cherry Street Landing is situated on the southern portion of the deck running congruent with Cherry Street. It is 4,900 square feet with bench seating for rest stop and nature viewing.

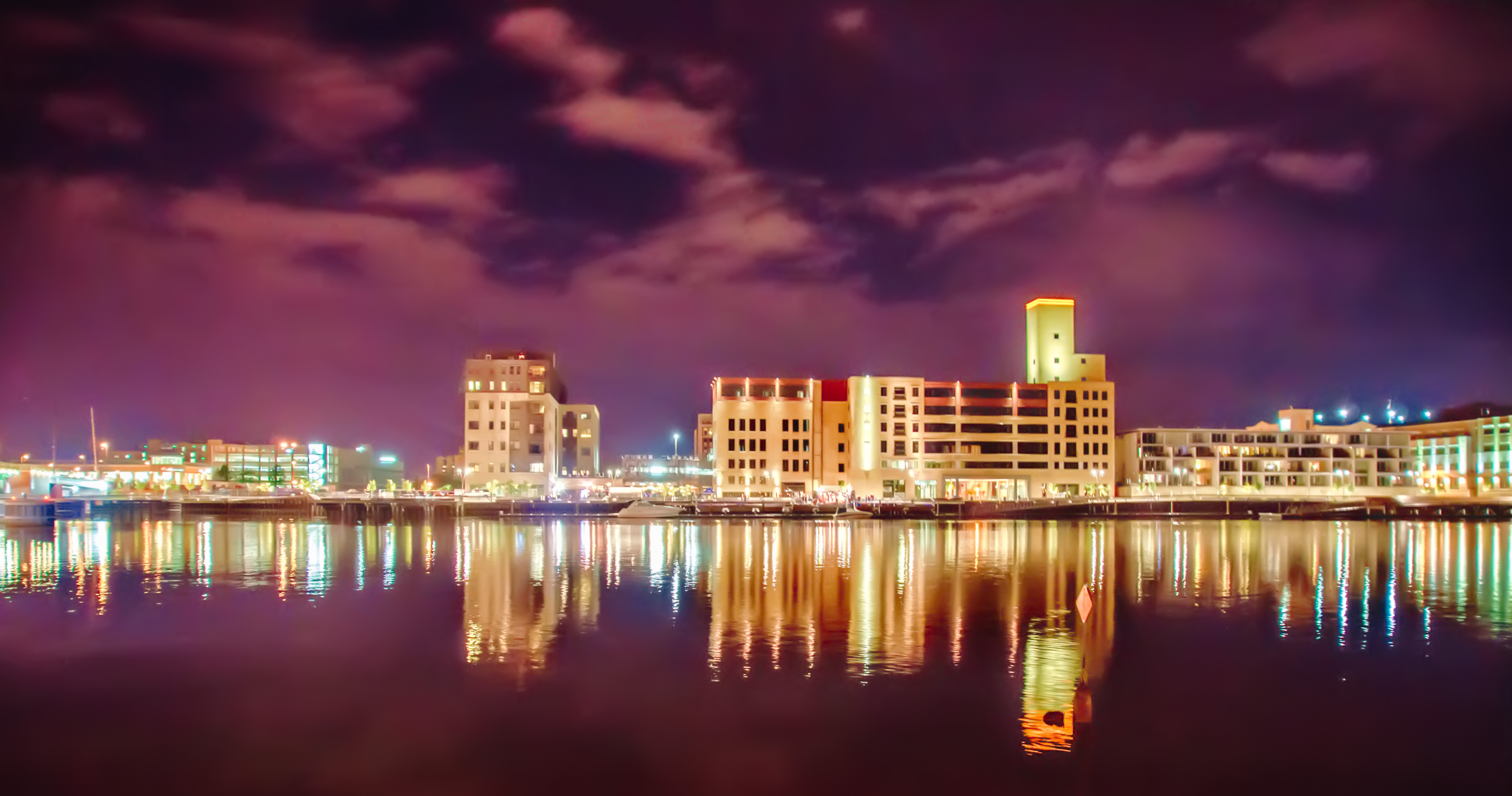

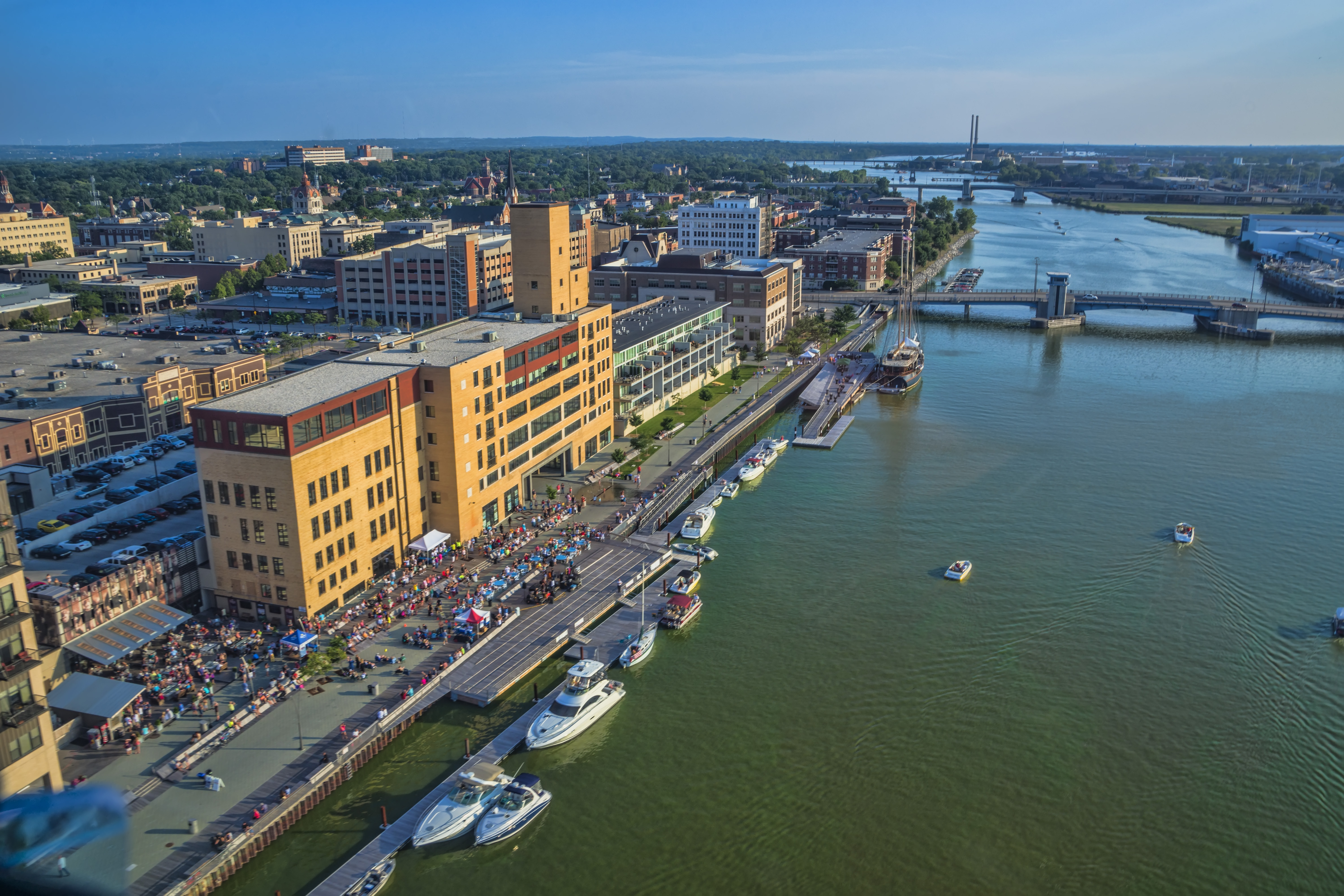
