= Paul Marin de la Malgue =

Paul Marin de la Malgue (bap. 19 March 1692 – 29 October 1753) was the eldest son of Charles-Paul Marin de la Malgue and Catherine Niquet. He was born in Montreal and, as many of the prominent historical figures of his time, had a military career in the colonial regular troops. He was commissioned an ensign in May 1722, and in the same year he was given command of a post near Ashland, Wisconsin.

His career was a military one with a significant amount of time spent south of New France in what is now part of the United States. His activities, which included the construction of Fort de la Rivière au Bœuf (Fort Le Boeuf) are significant in the attempts of the French to secure a sustainable foothold in the Ohio region. His military successes earned him the cross of Saint Louis but he died before learning of this honor.

In 1730, he led the battle at the Siege of Little Butte des Mortes, in what is now Winnebago County, Wisconsin.

He also fought in Nova Scotia in the Naval battle off Tatamagouche and Siege of Annapolis Royal (1745) during King George's War.
