= Fox Crossing, Wisconsin =

- Village
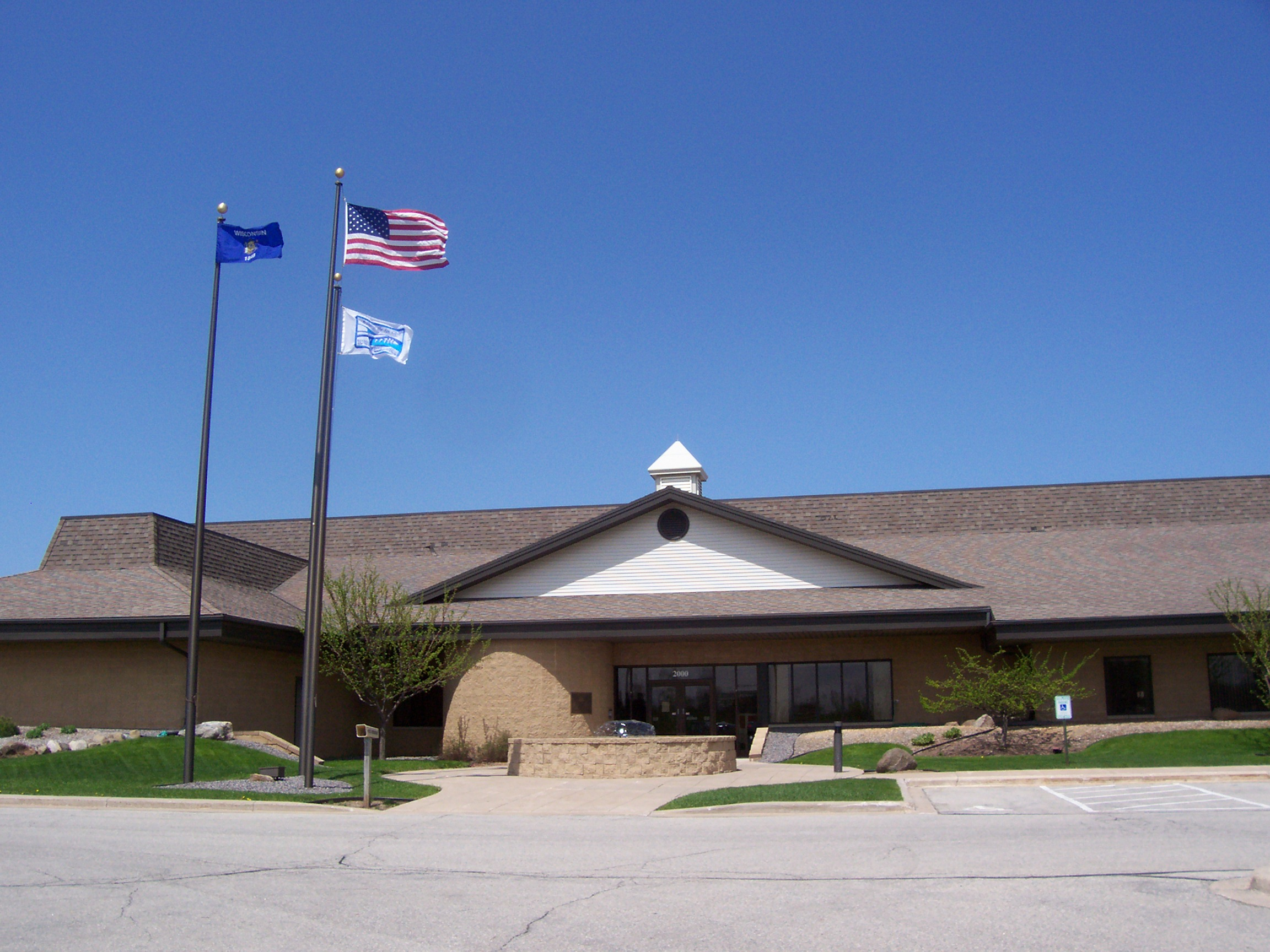
- Fox Crossing Municipal Complex
- Motto: "Bridging the Fox Cities"
- Location of Fox Crossing in Winnebago County, Wisconsin.

- Location within Wisconsin Location within the United States
- Coordinates: 44°13′11″N 88°29′07″W
- Country: United States
- State: Wisconsin
- County: Winnebago
- Established: April 20, 2016

Area
  - Total: 13.74 sq mi (35.59 km^{2})
  - Land: 12.25 sq mi (31.73 km^{2})
  - Water: 1.49 sq mi (3.86 km^{2})
- Elevation: 768 ft (234 m)

Population (2020)
  - Total: 18,974
  - Density: 1,551.7/sq mi (599.12/km^{2})
- Time zone: UTC-6 (Central (CST))
  - Summer (DST): UTC-5 (CDT)
- Postal codes: 54956 (primary), 54915, 54952
- Area code: 920
- GNIS ID: 2783854
- Website: http://www.foxcrossingwi.gov/

Fox Crossing is a village in Winnebago County, Wisconsin, United States. The population as of the 2020 census was 18,974. It was incorporated from the former town of Menasha in 2016. Fox Crossing is located in the Fox Cities region and the Oshkosh metropolitan area.

== History ==
The Town of Menasha was organized on April 3, 1855, in part from land formerly belonging to the Town of Neenah. The original land area of the town was reduced over several decades due to annexations by the cities of Menasha and Appleton.

After town residents west of Little Lake Butte des Morts approved a referendum to incorporate, the Village was incorporated on April 20, 2016. On August 17, 2016, an agreement was reached between the Village of Fox Crossing and the remaining Town of Menasha to annex all remaining town lands to Fox Crossing. This agreement effectively ended the existence of the Town of Menasha. On September 22, 2016, the remaining parts of the town of Menasha became part of the Village of Fox Crossing. Officials from Fox Crossing reportedly told officials from nearby municipalities that the sole motivation for incorporation was to avoid being annexed by a larger community.

A prominent feature of the village's early history was border struggles; Fox Crossing was sued by the town of Clayton and town of Neenah over separate disputes. Clayton sued Fox Crossing in December 2017 over a 72-acre annexation the previous September, and Fox Crossing sued Clayton in 2018 over a wastewater collection settlement with the Department of Natural Resources. Clayton had previously rebuffed attempts by Fox Crossing to annex three more high-value acres of land in exchange for wastewater service. In 2020, the town and village agreed to a wastewater collection plan. Clayton paid Fox Crossing a one-time sum of $11.5 million and Fox Crossing agreed to a decade of inaction annexing land in Clayton. In June 2020, Fox Crossing annexed over a hundred acres of land from the town of Neenah at the site of a future Neenah High School. It was later revealed that Fox Crossing and Neenah had a border agreement in place from 2016 through 2019; the town blamed Fox Crossing for failing to find a long-term border solution.

== Geography ==
Fox Crossing is located at the north end of Lake Winnebago along the Fox River which forms Little Lake Butte des Morts through the Village. The Village partially surrounds the City of Menasha. Other adjacent communities include: Harrison to the east, the City of Neenah and Town of Neenah to the south, Clayton to the west, and the Outagamie County communities of Greenville and Grand Chute to the north and Appleton to the northeast.

According to the United States Census Bureau, the Village has a total area of 13.9 square miles (36.0 km^{2}), of which 12.2 square miles (31.5 km^{2}) is land and 1.7 square miles (4.5 km^{2}), or 12.50%, is water.

== Demographics ==
Historical population
Census	Pop.	Note	%±
1950	3,007		—
1960	5,480		82.2%
1970	8,682		58.4%
1980	12,307		41.8%
1990	14,368		16.7%
2000	15,868		10.4%
2010	18,498		16.6%
2020	18,974		2.6%

=== 2020 census ===
As of the 2020 census, Fox Crossing had a population of 18,974. The median age was 39.6 years. 20.5% of residents were under the age of 18 and 17.3% were 65 years of age or older. For every 100 females there were 99.2 males, and for every 100 females age 18 and over there were 97.1 males age 18 and over.

98.9% of residents lived in urban areas, while 1.1% lived in rural areas.

There were 8,224 households in Fox Crossing, of which 25.6% had children under the age of 18 living in them. Of all households, 47.6% were married-couple households, 19.4% were households with a male householder and no spouse or partner present, and 24.1% were households with a female householder and no spouse or partner present. About 31.1% of all households were made up of individuals and 10.8% had someone living alone who was 65 years of age or older.

There were 8,572 housing units, of which 4.1% were vacant. The homeowner vacancy rate was 1.2% and the rental vacancy rate was 3.4%.

Racial composition as of the 2020 census
Race	Number	Percent
White	15,982	84.2%
Black or African American	358	1.9%
American Indian and Alaska Native	106	0.6%
Asian	791	4.2%
Native Hawaiian and Other Pacific Islander	3	0.0%
Some other race	630	3.3%
Two or more races	1,104	5.8%
Hispanic or Latino (of any race)	1,304	6.9%

=== Income and employment ===
In 2020, the employment rate was 65.5%, and the median household income was $70,664.

== Education ==
Public education is provided by the Neenah Joint School District, west of Little Lake Butte des Morts, and the Menasha Joint School District, east of the lake.

St. Mary Catholic High School and St. Mary Catholic Middle School are located in Fox Crossing.

== Points of interest ==
- Fox River
- Friendship State Trail
- Lake Winnebago
- Little Lake Butte des Morts
- Tri-County Arena

== Transportation ==
Major transportation routes in Fox Crossing include:

Interstate 41 and US 41 travels north to Appleton and Green Bay and south to Oshkosh and Milwaukee.
US 10 (Tri-County Expressway) travels east to Manitowoc and west to Waupaca, Stevens Point, and western Wisconsin.
WIS 114 (Plank Road) travels east to Harrison and Sherwood.
WIS 47 (Appleton Road) travels north to Appleton, Shawano, and northern Wisconsin.
County AP (Midway Road) travels east to Appleton.
County BB (Prospect Avenue) travels east to Appleton and west to WIS 76.
County CB (West Side Arterial) travels south to Neenah and north to Greenville.
County II (Winchester Road) travels east to Neenah and west to Winchester.
County P (Racine Road and Valley Road) travels east to Appleton and south to Menasha.

Appleton International Airport is located adjacent to Fox Crossing in Greenville. Valley Transit provides bus services.
