= Larsen, Wisconsin =

- Unincorporated community
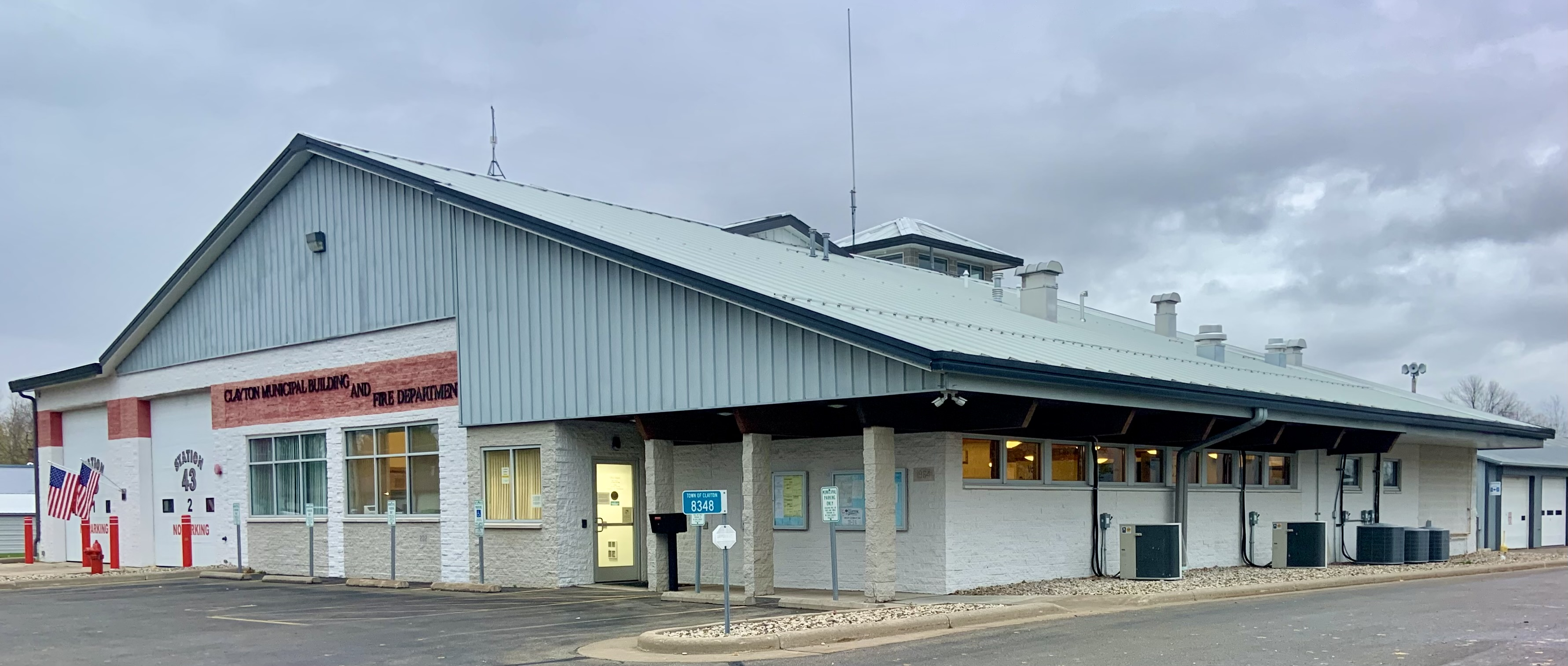
- Clayton Town Hall in Larsen

- Location within Wisconsin Location within the United States
- Coordinates: 44°11′30″N 88°37′26″W
- Country: United States
- State: Wisconsin
- County: Winnebago
- Elevation: 771 ft (235 m)
- Time zone: UTC-6 (Central (CST))
  - Summer (DST): UTC-5 (CDT)
- ZIP code: 54947
- Area code: 920
- GNIS feature ID: 1567855

Larsen is an unincorporated community in the town of Clayton, in Winnebago County, Wisconsin, United States.

== History ==
A post office called Larsen has been in operation since 1898. The community was named for Philip Larsen, the first storekeeper there.

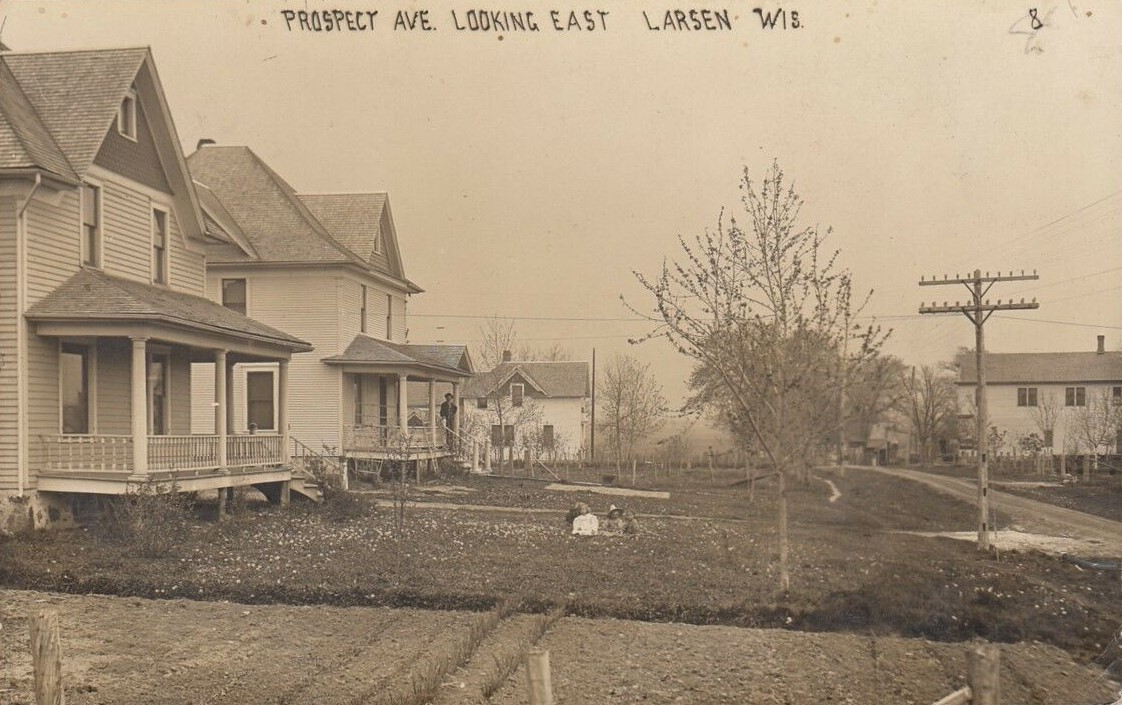
Larsen, Wisconsin in August 1913

== Religion ==
St Peter's Lutheran Church is a Christian church of the Wisconsin Evangelical Lutheran Synod in Larsen.

== Transportation ==
The Larson Brothers Airport is located near Larsen.
