= William P. Grimes =

American politician

William P. Grimes (August 17, 1868 – February 12, 1939) was an American farmer, businessman, and politician.

Born in Menasha, Winnebago County, Wisconsin, Grimes was a farmer and helped organize the West Menasha Telephone Company. Grimes served on the Menasha Town Board for 18 years starting in 1889, and was chairman of the town board. He married Mary A. Delmore in 1900. He became director of the Vinland Fire Insurance Company in 1920. Grimes served on the Winnebago County Board of Supervisors. He also served on the school board and was the board treasurer. In 1933 and 1935, Grimes served in the Wisconsin State Assembly and was a Democrat. Grimes died at his home in the town of Menasha.
