= Fred Hess (politician) =

American politician (1858-1925)

Fred Hess (November 13, 1858 – November 7, 1925) was an American politician.

Born in the town of Winchester, Winnebago County, Wisconsin, Hess moved to a farm in the town of Dale, Outagamie County, Wisconsin. In 1888, Hess and his wife moved to Clintonville, Wisconsin where he became the chief of police. In 1900, Hess was elected as the sheriff of Waupaca County and was a Republican. He was on the board of trustees for the Waupaca County Asylum. In 1915, 1917 and 1921, Hess served in the Wisconsin State Assembly. He died in a hospital in Oshkosh, Wisconsin.
