= Herman A. Porath =

American politician

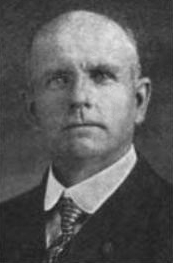

Member of the Wisconsin State Assembly
- In office 1919

Personal details
- Born: October 19, 1863 Germany
- Died: April 20, 1938 (aged 74) Neenah, Wisconsin, US
- Party: Republican
- Occupation: Building contractor, politician

Herman A. Porath (October 19, 1863 – April 20, 1938) was a German-American building contractor and politician.

== Biography ==
Born in Germany, Porath emigrated with his parents to the United States and settled in the town of Winchester, Winnebago County, Wisconsin. Porath learned to be a carpenter and was a builder and contractor. Porath served as treasurer of the town of Vinland, Wisconsin and on the school board. In 1919, Porath served in the Wisconsin State Assembly and was a Republican. Porath died in Gillingham Corners in Neenah, Wisconsin after a period of ill health.
