= Siege of Little Butte des Morts =

Coordinates: 44°12′22.7″N 88°28′20.3″W

- Part of the Fox Wars
Date	1716
Location	Little Lake Butte des Morts Wisconsin
Result	New France victory

Belligerents
Mesquakie	New France

Commanders and leaders
Mesquakie	Sieur Louvingny

Strength
552 warriors	800 with native American allies

Casualties and losses
?	?

The siege of Little Butte des Morts was a battle fought during the Fox Wars, in Wisconsin, and Michigan. The battle was fought at Little Lake Butte des Morts, in what is now Winnebago County, Wisconsin, in 1716. At the time, the Fox had a massive stronghold at Butte Des Mortes, with possibly thousands of inhabitants. New France, knowing that Butte Des Morts was an important stronghold during the Fox Wars, laid siege to the fort. The French brought two pieces of cannon and a grenade mortar. The siege lasted three days, much longer than the French had anticipated. Butte des Morts was attacked by New France again in 1730, led by Paul Marin de la Malgue.

There has recently been some doubt about the veracity of the 1730 attack, leading to the removal of the Butte des Morts historic marker in March 2017.
