= Winchester (CDP), Wisconsin =

Census-designated place in Wisconsin, United States

Winchester, Wisconsin
- Census-designated place
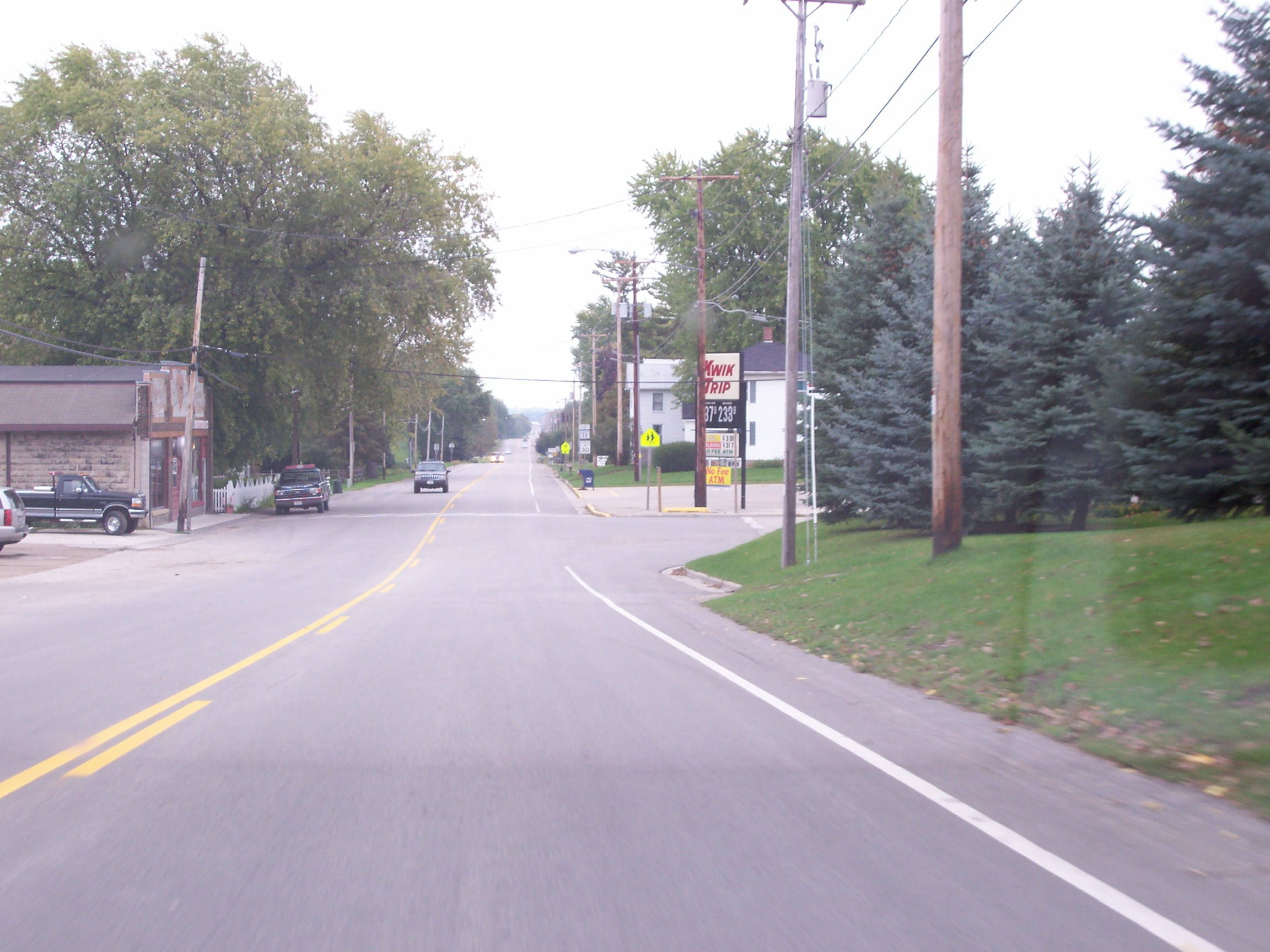
- Looking west in Winchester

- Location within Wisconsin
- Coordinates: 44°11′55″N 88°39′53″W
- Country: United States
- State: Wisconsin
- County: Winnebago

Area
  - Total: 2.320 sq mi (6.01 km^{2})
  - Land: 2.320 sq mi (6.01 km^{2})
  - Water: 0 sq mi (0 km^{2})
- Elevation: 846 ft (258 m)

Population (2020)
  - Total: 649
  - Density: 280/sq mi (108/km^{2})
- Time zone: UTC-6 (Central (CST))
  - Summer (DST): UTC-5 (CDT)
- Area code: 920
- GNIS feature ID: 1576840

Winchester is an unincorporated census-designated place in the town of Winchester in Winnebago County, Wisconsin, United States. The community is located less than one mile (one kilometer) from the southern intersection of U.S. routes 10 and 45. Wisconsin Highway 150 passed east–west through the community until the road was decommissioned by the state of Wisconsin, the road is now designated County Highway II. It has an elevation of 846 feet above mean sea level at latitude 44.199 and longitude -88.665. As of the 2020 census, its population is 649.

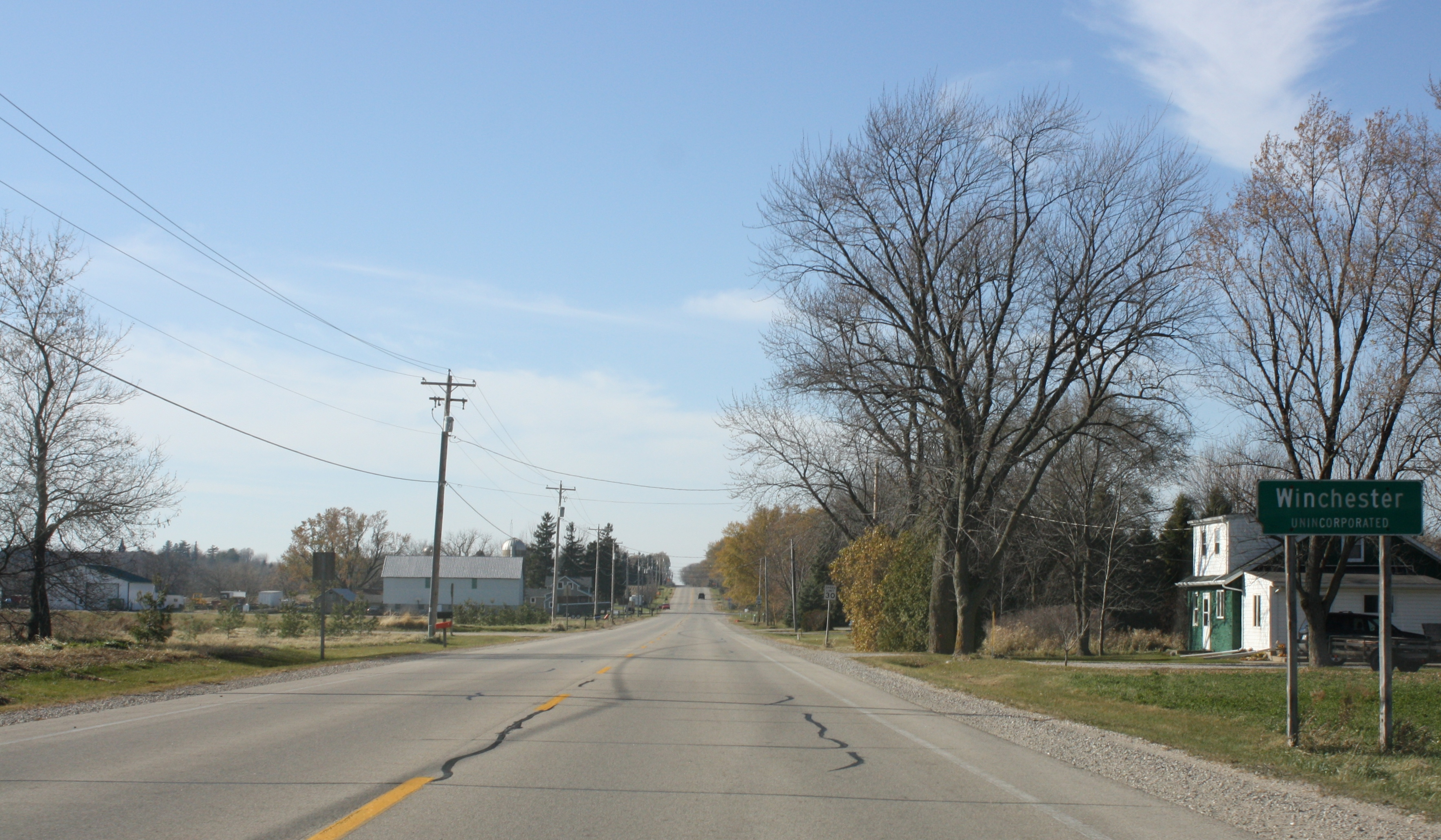
Welcome sign

== Notable people ==
- The Norwegian-American writer Peer Stromme was born in Winchester.

The demographics, according to the 2020 Census, place the population at 98.8% Caucasian, there are no known African American or Native American inhabitants, but the population is believed to be 1.1% Pacific Islander or Asian American, more than one race, or "Other" racial categories.
