= Charles-Paul Marin de la Malgue =

Charles-Paul Marin de la Malgue, (1633 – 14 April 1713), was an officer in the colonial regular troops. The first record of his activity is in 1682 when he set out from Fort Frontenac to investigate the death of a prominent member of the Seneca tribe. In 1688, he was released from duties to go to France; his country of birth.

He returned to Canada, resumed his military duties, and married Catherine Niquet in 1691. They had six children, four of whom lived to be adults and the eldest being Paul Marin de la Malgue. Charles-Paul was mentioned by Governor Louis de Buade de Frontenac as being sent, along with Pierre Le Moyne d'Iberville to attack Fort Nelson, a fur trading post at the mouth of the Nelson River. The attack was cancelled because of inadequate ships. He has also been mentioned as a recipient of the cross of Saint Louis but this does not appear in official records and was likely an invention of his heirs.
