= Winchester, Winnebago County, Wisconsin =

Winchester, Wisconsin
- Town
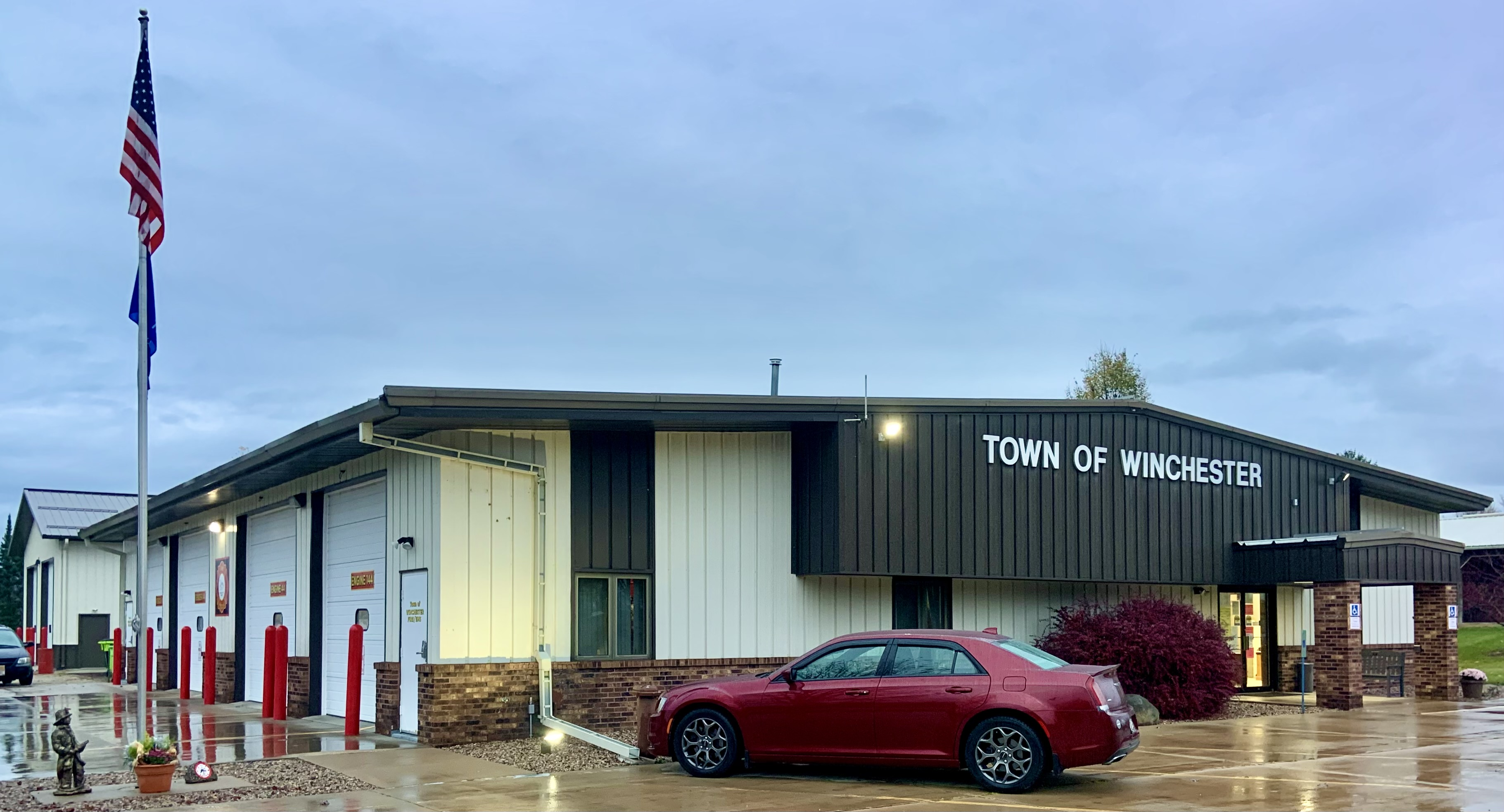
- Town hall

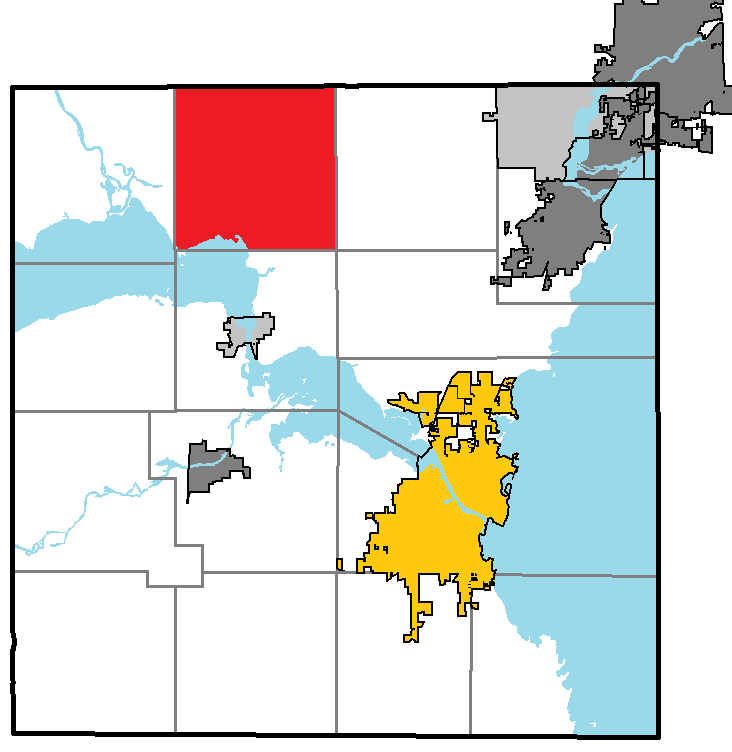
- Location of Winchester, within Winnebago County, Wisconsin
- Coordinates: 44°11′36″N 88°41′36″W
- Country: United States
- State: Wisconsin
- County: Winnebago

Area
  - Total: 36.5 sq mi (94.6 km^{2})
  - Land: 35.5 sq mi (91.9 km^{2})
  - Water: 1.0 sq mi (2.7 km^{2})
- Elevation: 761 ft (232 m)

Population (2020)
  - Total: 1,794
  - Density: 50.6/sq mi (19.5/km^{2})
- Time zone: UTC-6 (Central (CST))
  - Summer (DST): UTC-5 (CDT)
- Area code: 920
- FIPS code: 55-87650
- GNIS feature ID: 1584452
- Website: townofwinchesterwi.gov

Winchester is a town in Winnebago County, Wisconsin, United States. The population was 1,794 at the 2020 census. The census-designated place of Winchester and unincorporated communities of Clarks Point, Indian Shores, Lasleys Point and Piacenza are located in the town.

== Geography ==
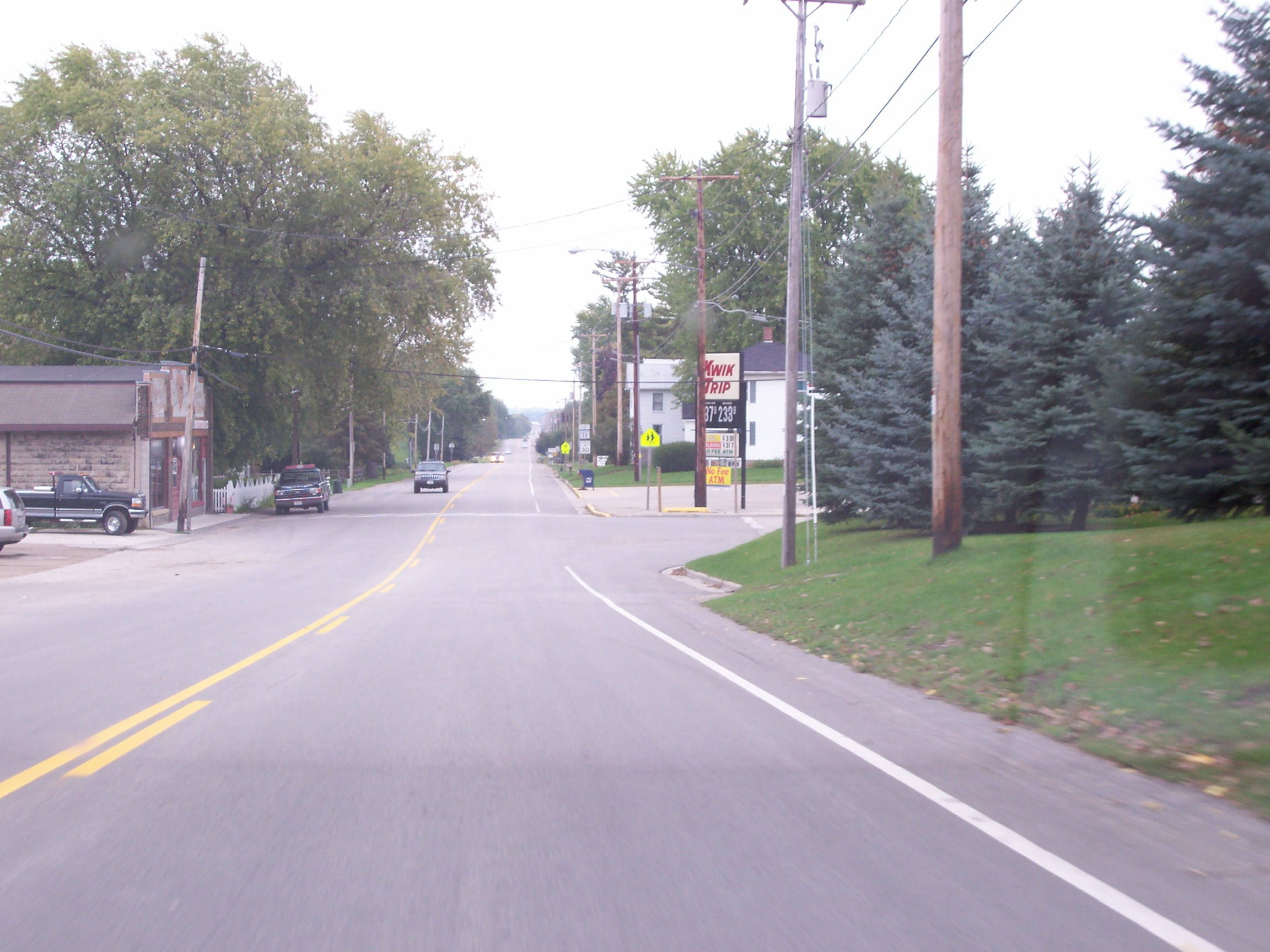
Downtown Winchester

According to the United States Census Bureau, the town has a total area of 36.5 square miles (94.6 km^{2}), of which 35.5 square miles (91.9 km^{2}) is land and 1.0 square mile (2.7 km^{2}), or 2.82%, is water.

== Demographics ==
At the 2000 census there were 1,676 people, 620 households, and 491 families in the town. The population density was 46.8 people per square mile (18.1/km^{2}). There were 636 housing units at an average density of 17.8 per square mile (6.9/km^{2}). The racial makeup of the town was 99.22% White, 0.18% African American, 0.06% Native American, 0.12% from other races, and 0.42% from two or more races. Hispanic or Latino of any race were 0.48%.

Of the 620 households 34.8% had children under the age of 18 living with them, 70.5% were married couples living together, 5.6% had a female householder with no husband present, and 20.8% were non-families. 15.6% of households were one person and 7.3% were one person aged 65 or older. The average household size was 2.70 and the average family size was 3.05.

The age distribution was 26.3% under the age of 18, 6.1% from 18 to 24, 30.5% from 25 to 44, 25.5% from 45 to 64, and 11.6% 65 or older. The median age was 38 years. For every 100 females, there were 103.2 males. For every 100 females age 18 and over, there were 100.3 males.

The median household income was $53,400 and the median family income was $56,164. Males had a median income of $39,766 versus $26,583 for females. The per capita income for the town was $21,182. About 2.7% of families and 3.4% of the population were below the poverty line, including 2.9% of those under age 18 and 8.7% of those aged 65 or over.

== Notable people ==
- Fred Hess, Wisconsin state legislator (born in Winchester)
- Nels Larson, Wisconsin state legislator and businessman (lived in Winchester)
- Herman A. Porath, Wisconsin state legislator and building contractor (lived in Winchester)
- Peer Stromme, pastor, teacher, journalist, and author

== Popular culture ==
Wisconsin poet/spoken word artist Geo Kiesow's piece, "That's When All Hell Broke Loose in Winchester, Wisconsin", describes the town's lemons-to-lemonade reaction to a watermelon truck collision.
