= Little Lake Butte des Morts =

Lake in Wisconsin, United States

- Location within Wisconsin Location within the United States
- Location: Winnebago County, Wisconsin, United States
- Coordinates: 44°12′34″N 088°27′51″W
- Primary inflows: Fox River
- Basin countries: United States
- Surface elevation: about 736 ft (224 m)

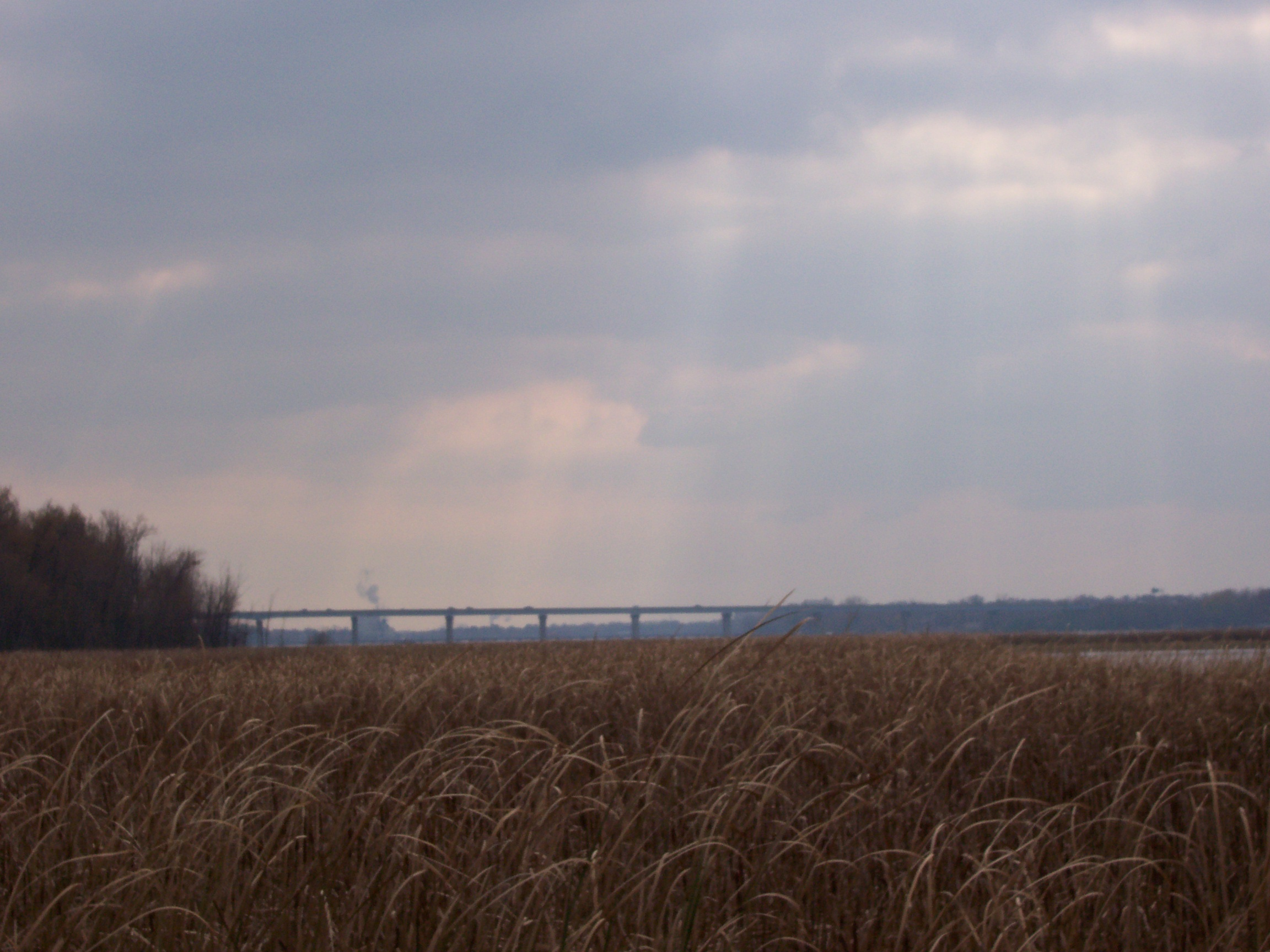
Looking south over Little Lake Butte des Morts at the Roland Kampo Memorial Bridge for Highway 441

Little Lake Butte des Morts is a lake in the US state of Wisconsin, eight miles north of Lake Butte des Morts. It is part of the Fox–Wisconsin Waterway and receives its inflow from a short segment of the Fox River which drains from the north end of Lake Winnebago around Doty Island. The north end of Little Lake Butte des Morts becomes the section of the Fox River running to Green Bay. The lake is part of the Butte des Morts region in Winnebago County, Wisconsin. The southern half of the lake is located within the cities of Menasha and Neenah.

The name "Butte des Morts" was given by French settlers, and means "Mound of the Dead" in reference to a nearby Indian burial mound. French archives state that in 1716, over 8000 civilians and over 500 soldiers lived within the fortified walls of Little Lake Butte des Morts. In 1716, during the Fox Wars, French expeditionary forces laid siege to the fort, in the battle of the Siege of Little Butte des Morts, and massacred most of the inhabitants. Similar events occurred in another siege in 1730.

The Roland Kampo Memorial Bridge which carries the Tri-County Expressway (WIS 441/US 10) crosses the lake. The Fox Cities Trestle Bridge, a rail trail also crosses the lake. It carries the Loop the Lake Trail and Friendship State Trail.
