= Clayton, Winnebago County, Wisconsin =

Clayton, Wisconsin
- Town
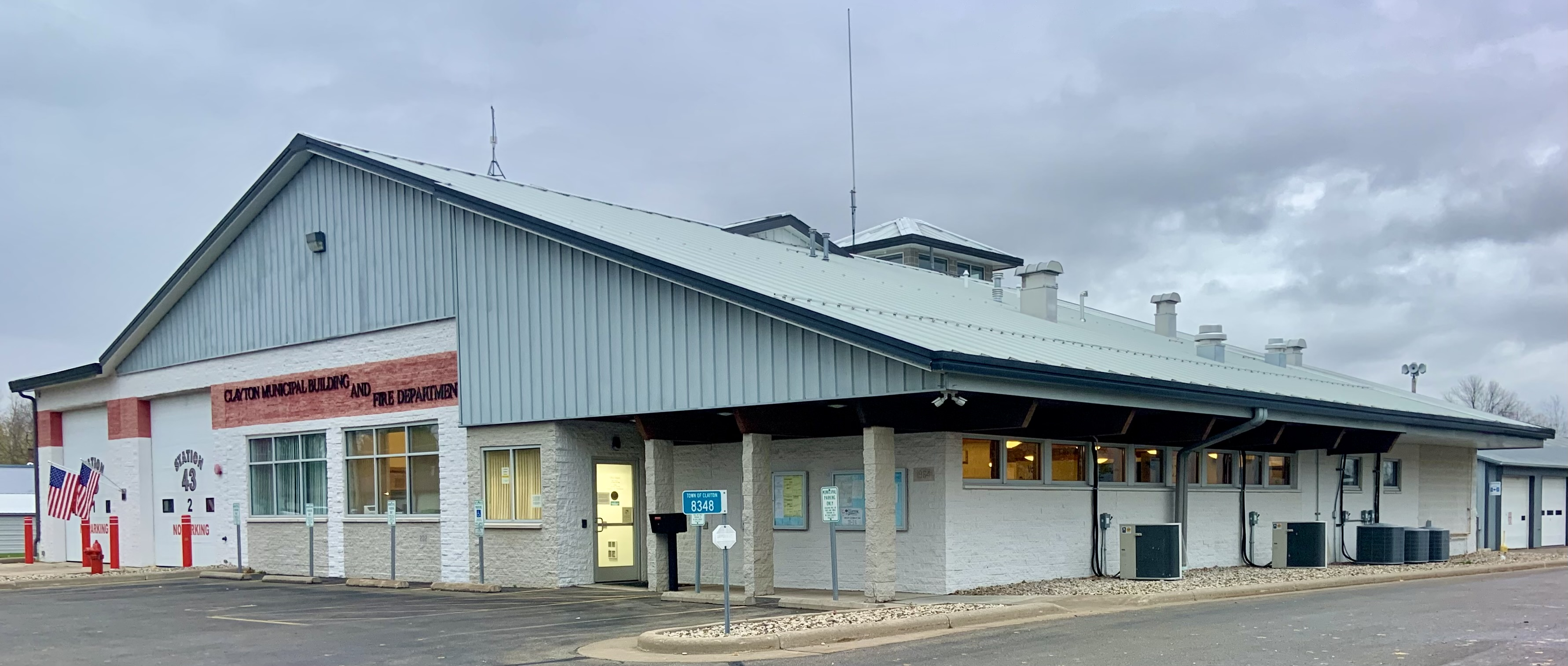
- Town hall in Larsen

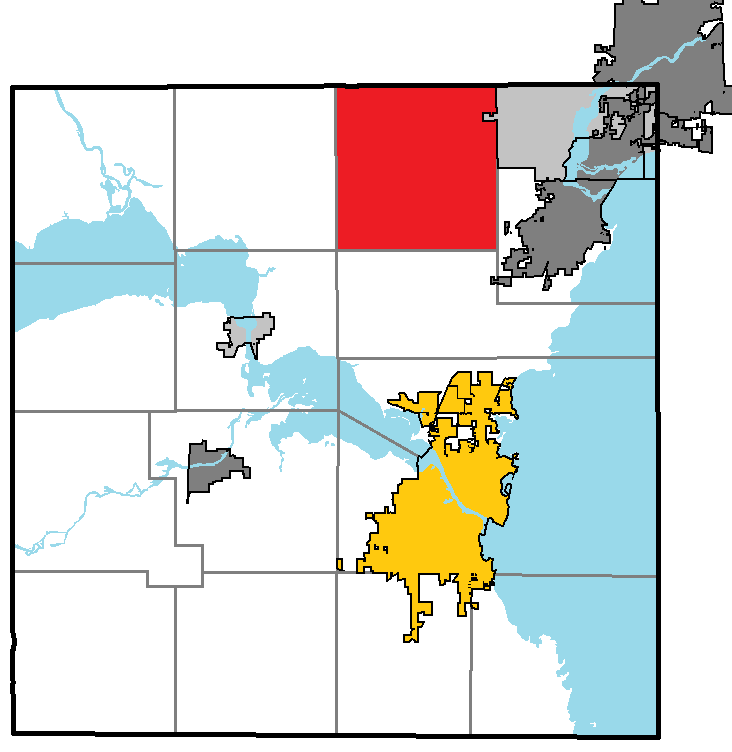
- Location of Clayton, within Winnebago County, Wisconsin
- Coordinates: 44°11′41″N 88°35′6″W
- Country: United States
- State: Wisconsin
- County: Winnebago

Area
  - Total: 36.4 sq mi (94.3 km^{2})
  - Land: 36.3 sq mi (94.0 km^{2})
  - Water: 0.12 sq mi (0.3 km^{2})
- Elevation: 846 ft (258 m)

Population (2020)
  - Total: 4,329
  - Density: 119/sq mi (46.1/km^{2})
- Time zone: UTC-6 (Central (CST))
  - Summer (DST): UTC-5 (CDT)
- Area code: 920
- FIPS code: 55-15150
- GNIS feature ID: 1582969
- Website: www.townofclayton.net

Clayton is a town in Winnebago County, Wisconsin, United States. The population was 4,329 at the 2020 census. The unincorporated communities of Larsen, Medina Junction, and Mikesville are located within the town.

== History ==
Due to annexations by Fox Crossing, Wisconsin, Clayton sued Fox Crossing in late 2017 and was subsequently sued by the village for a wastewater collection settlement with the Wisconsin Department of Natural Resources. The town reached a water deal with the city of Appleton in 2018 but negotiated with Fox Crossing for a new deal in 2020, paying the village $11.5 million in exchange for sewer and water in addition to an agreement not to annex any part of the town for ten years.

In 2018, town leaders began incorporation efforts into a village for eastern portions of the town in order to avoid being annexed by Fox Crossing.

== Geography ==
According to the United States Census Bureau, the town has a total area of 36.4 square miles (94.3 km^{2}), of which 36.3 square miles (94.0 km^{2}) is land and 0.12 square miles (0.3 km^{2}), or 0.33%, is water.

== Demographics ==
As of the census of 2000, there were 2,974 people, 1,071 households, and 882 families living in the town. The population density was 81.6 people per square mile (31.5/km^{2}). There were 1,096 housing units at an average density of 30.1 per square mile (11.6/km^{2}). The racial makeup of the town was 97.92% White, 0.17% African American, 0.30% Native American, 0.71% Asian, 0.34% from other races, and 0.57% from two or more races. Hispanic or Latino of any race were 0.67% of the population.

There were 1,071 households, out of which 37.1% had children under the age of 18 living with them, 75.0% were married couples living together, 4.9% had a female householder with no husband present, and 17.6% were non-families. 12.6% of all households were made up of individuals, and 4.2% had someone living alone who was 65 years of age or older. The average household size was 2.78 and the average family size was 3.04.

In the town, the population was spread out, with 27.1% under the age of 18, 5.9% from 18 to 24, 31.0% from 25 to 44, 25.9% from 45 to 64, and 10.2% who were 65 years of age or older. The median age was 39 years. For every 100 females, there were 102.7 males. For every 100 females age 18 and over, there were 103.8 males.

The median income for a household in the town was $62,551, and the median income for a family was $64,525. Males had a median income of $42,591 versus $30,361 for females. The per capita income for the town was $23,713. About 1.0% of families and 1.9% of the population were below the poverty line, including 1.6% of those under age 18 and 3.7% of those age 65 or over.

== Transportation ==
The Larson Brothers Airport is located in the town.
