= Fox River State Recreational Trail =

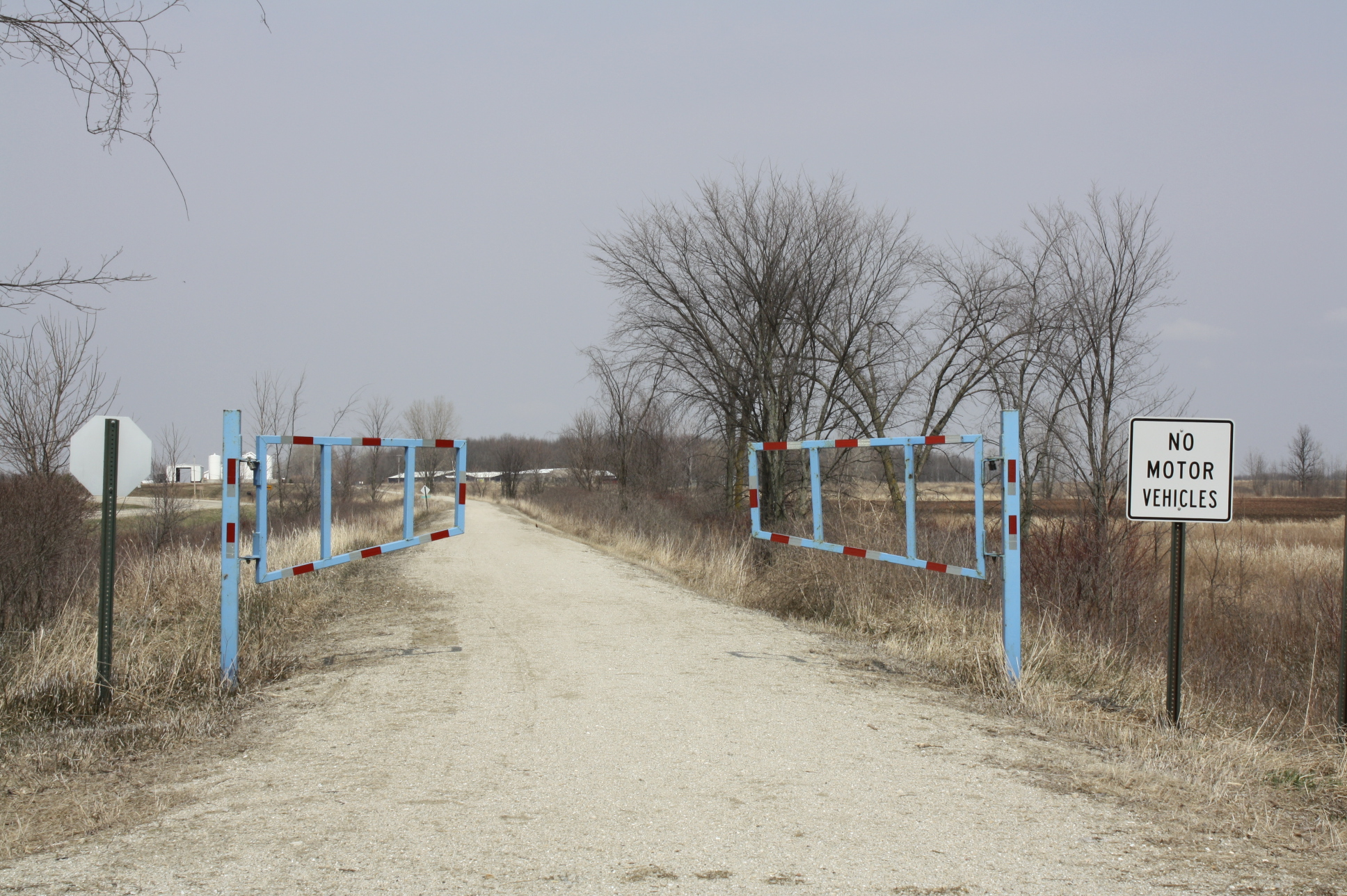
Southern limestone trail in Calumet County

The Fox River State Recreational Trail (also known as the Fox River Trail) is a trail along the Fox River in northeastern Wisconsin.

== Route ==
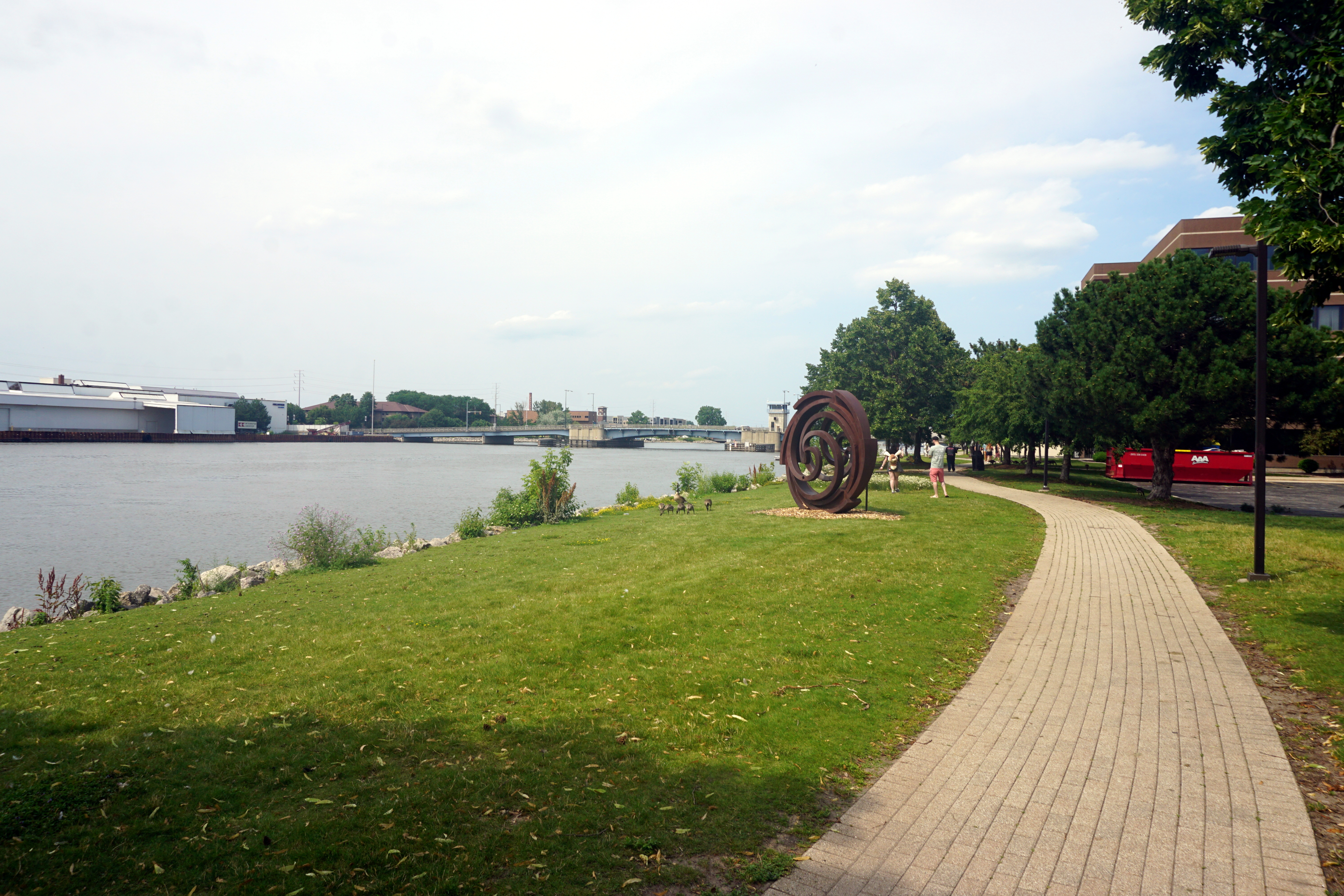
Fox River Trail in downtown Green Bay

The trail begins at the CityDeck in Green Bay, Wisconsin (44°30′29″N 88°01′09″W), follows the Fox River south through De Pere, then deviatiating east, away from the river, where it follows a former railroad bed through Rockland, Wrightstown, Greenleaf, Holland, and ends at Ott Road in Hilbert (44°10′08″N 88°09′35″W). At the north end, it connects with the City of Green Bay Trail which continues north along the Fox and East Rivers to Monroe Street. The total length of the trail is approximately 26.3 miles. The northern 12 miles is paved, the southern 14 miles is crushed limestone.

== Access ==
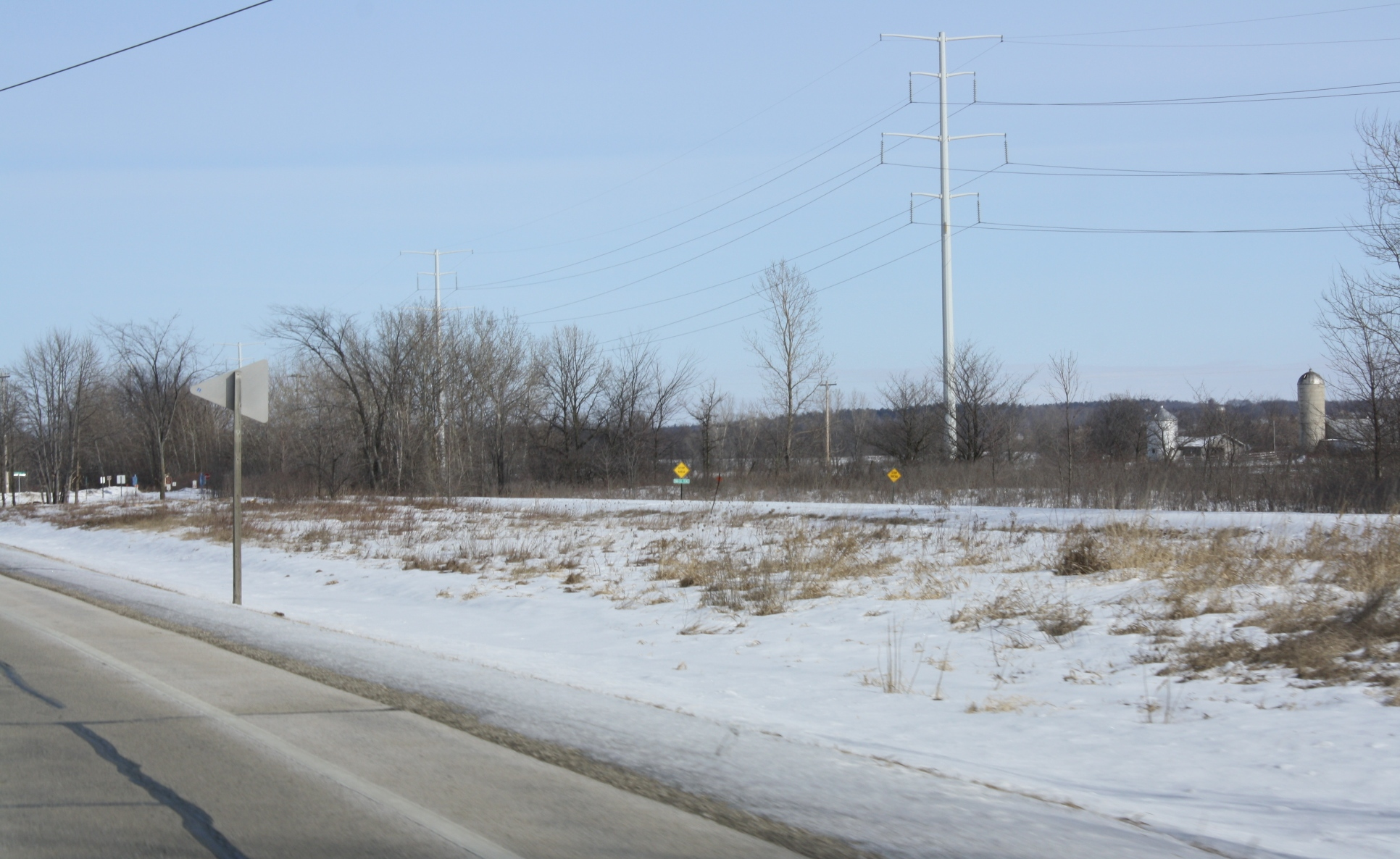
Trail as viewed from WIS 57 / WIS 32.

The trail is open year-round from 5:00 am to 9:00 pm. Walking and bicycling is permitted the entire length. Rollerblading is permitted on the paved portions. Horseback riding is permitted from Klaus Street in Greenleaf south to the Brown County/Calumet County line. Leashed dogs are also permitted. The fee is $5 for a daily pass or $25 for an annual pass for all bicyclists, rollerbladers and horseback riders over the age of 16. There is no charge for walking.

== History ==
The Milwaukee and Northern Railway Company used what would become the trail for rail service between Green Bay and Milwaukee, which ran from 1873 to 1989. The corridor was purchased by the Wisconsin Department of Natural Resources in 1998.
