= David R. Bean =

American politician

David R. Bean (January 26, 1827 – March 26, 1891) was an American miller from Waukau, Wisconsin who spent one term as a Republican member of the Wisconsin State Assembly, and another as a Greenback Party member of the same body.

== Background ==
Bean was born January 26, 1827, in Milton in Chittenden County, Vermont, and had a public school education. In 1850 he went to California, and spent three and a half years mining there. He returned to Vermont for about a year, then moved to Wisconsin in 1856, spending some time in Omro before settling at Waukau and beginning the construction of a flour mill there in which he had a half-interest.

On September 14, 1863, he married Julia M. Boardman of Milton, Vermont, back home in Vermont. As of 1881, they would have two children. He was an active member of the Masonic Lodge in Berlin. In 1867, Bean and his wife sold land for the building of Waukau Methodist Episcopal Church next door to their home. He is reported to have given generously toward the purchase of a church bell, "so my name will always be remembered in connection with the church"; and was a member of the congregation, with his own pew (the only one with a cushion).

== Public office ==
Bean's 1880 official biography reports that he "held various local offices" (he was chairman of the town board in Waukau for at least two years). He was elected to the Assembly in 1862 as a Republican to represent the third Winnebago County district (the Towns of Black Wolf, Nekemi, Utica, Nepeuskun, Rushford, and Omro), succeeding fellow Republican Armine Pickett. He was assigned to the standing committees on agriculture and manufactures, and on banks and banking. He was not re-elected in 1863, and was succeeded by Republican Emery Davis. He was elected to the Assembly again in 1880, this time as a Greenback, receiving 510 votes against 451 for Republican former State Representative Alson Wood and 249 for Democrat John De Foe (Greenback incumbent Milan Ford was not a candidate for re-election). He was the only Greenback to be elected to the Assembly that year, although there was one "Greenback Democrat" (John C. Petersen). Bean was assigned to the committee on public improvements. He was defeated when he ran for re-election in 1881 by Republican Thomas J. Bowles, with 699 votes for Bowles, 424 for Bean, and 395 for Democrat Joseph Deyce. He would later run as a Greenback for the state Senate in 1882, and as a Democratic and Populist fusion candidate in 1886.

== Death and burial ==
He died March 26, 1891, and is buried in Omro Cemetery.
