= David Bean =

David Bean may refer to:

- David Bean (judge) (born 1954), British judge of the Court of Appeal of England and Wales
- David Marks Bean (1832–1884), Florida state legislator
- David R. Bean (1827–1891), Wisconsin state legislator
