= Armine Pickett =

19th century American politician

Member of the Wisconsin State Assembly from the Winnebago 3rd district
- In office January 7, 1861 – January 6, 1862
- Preceded by: George S. Barnum
- Succeeded by: David R. Bean

Personal details
- Born: July 10, 1800
- Died: April 25, 1875 (aged 74) Pickett, Wisconsin, U.S.
- Resting place: Liberty Prairie Cemetery, Pickett, Wisconsin
- Party: Republican; Reform (1870s)
- Spouse: Anne Pickett
- Children: James G. Pickett^{(b. 1829; died 1907)}; Olive (Lane-Wood)^{(b. 1832; died 1922)}

Armine Pickett (July 10, 1800 – April 25, 1875) was an American farmer, politician, and Wisconsin pioneer. He was the first white settler in the town of Utica, Winnebago County, Wisconsin, and the namesake of Pickett, Wisconsin. He also served one term in the Wisconsin State Assembly, representing southern Winnebago County in the 1861 session.

== Biography ==
Armine Pickett was born in July 1800. He resided for some time at Litchfield, Ohio, before moving west to the Wisconsin Territory in 1840. In Wisconsin, he initially settled in Jefferson County, but went north in the fall of 1845 and eventually selected to settle in what is now the town of Utica, Winnebago County, Wisconsin.

Although his time in Jefferson County was brief, it did have a lasting impact on the economy of the state due to the actions of his wife, Anne. While living on a farm in the vicinity of Lake Mills, Wisconsin, Anne had the idea to enlist their neighbors and the neighbors' cows in a cooperative to manufacture cheese. The neighbors agreed and provided Anne with their milk, which Anne then manufactured into cheese. The finished cheese was then distributed to the various cow-owners who could trade it for other goods in nearby markets. Her venture was described as the first dairy cooperative in the United States, and the first commercial cheese factory in Wisconsin.

In late August 1860, Pickett sheltered abolitionist Sherman Booth at his farm, where an unsuccessful attempt was made to arrest Booth under the Fugitive Slave Act for helping to free escaped slave Joshua Glover. A few months later, on November 6, 1860, he was elected a Republican member of the Wisconsin State Assembly for the Third Winnebago County Assembly district (the Towns of Black Wolf, Utica, Nepeuskin, Rushford, Omro and Nekemi).

He later ran for Wisconsin's 19th State Senate district as a candidate of the short-lived Democratic Reform or Liberal Reform Party, but was defeated in the 1874 general election.

He served as postmaster of the Welaunee or Weelaunee post office; and as chairman of the Town of Utica's board of supervisors.

The settlement of Pickett. Pickett Station or Pickett's Station, formerly named Weelaunee, was renamed in his honor.

He died April 25, 1875.

== Electoral history ==
=== Wisconsin Senate (1874) ===
Wisconsin Senate, 19th District Election, 1874
Party	Candidate	Votes	%	±%
General Election, November 3, 1874
Republican	William P. Rounds	4,051	54.06%	−5.25%
Reform	Armine Pickett	3,442	45.94%	
Plurality		609	8.13%	-10.50%
Total votes		7,493	100.0%	+3.48%
Republican hold				

Wisconsin State Assembly
Preceded by George S. Barnum	Member of the Wisconsin State Assembly from the Winnebago 3rd district January 7, 1861 – January 6, 1862	Succeeded by David R. Bean
