= Milan Ford =

American politician

Milan Ford (February 14, 1822 – August 22, 1900) was an American farmer from Oshkosh, Wisconsin, who served two years as a Greenback member of the Wisconsin State Assembly from Winnebago County.

== Background ==
Ford was born in Kinsman, Ohio, on February 14, 1822; received a common school education, and became a Farmer by occupation. He came to Wisconsin in 1837, and settled in Winnebago County near Oshkosh. He served as chairman of the Town of Nekimi, and held other local offices.

== Assembly ==
He was elected in 1877 from the 4th Assembly district of Winnebago County (the Towns of Nepeuskun, Nekimi, Poygan, Rushford, Utica, and Wolf River) as a Greenback, with 518 votes to 355 for Democrat E. B. Rounds and 261 for Republican George Slingsby (Republican incumbent Sidney Shufelt was not a candidate for re-election). He was assigned to the standing committee on federal relations, which he chaired (the Democrats and Republicans were almost tied in the Assembly, and the 13 Greenbacks and 1 socialist had a disproportionate influence as tiebreakers).

He was re-elected in 1878, with 660 votes against 536 for Republican Thomas J. Bowles. He was assigned to the committees on ways and means, and on the militia. He was not a candidate for re-election in 1879, and was succeeded by fellow Greenback David R. Bean.

== Death ==
Ford died on August 22, 1900, in Nekimi, Wisconsin.
