= George Gary =

American politician (1824–1909)

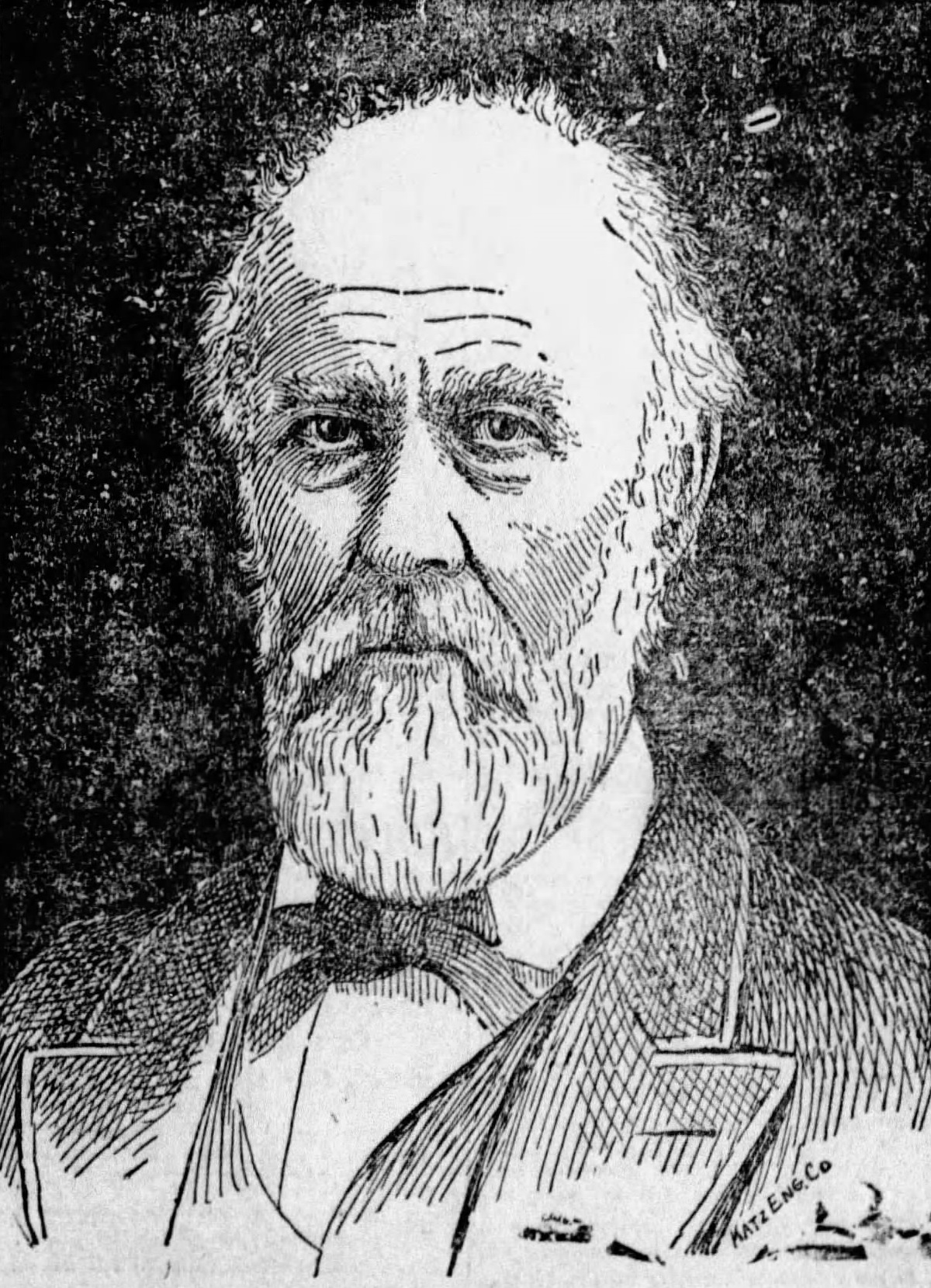
- From Oshkosh Northwestern obituary (Oct. 22, 1909)

County Judge of Winnebago County, Wisconsin
- In office January 1, 1870 – April 1, 1882
- Preceded by: Joseph B. Hamilton
- Succeeded by: Joseph B. Hamilton

Member of the Wisconsin Senate from the 21st district
- In office January 7, 1867 – October 1867
- Preceded by: George S. Barnum
- Succeeded by: William G. Ritch

Wisconsin Circuit Court Clerk for Winnebago County, Wisconsin
- In office November 1857 – January 1, 1861
- Preceded by: Jedediah H. Smalley
- Succeeded by: William G. Ritch

Member of the Wisconsin State Assembly from the Winnebago 1st district
- In office January 2, 1854 – January 7, 1856
- Preceded by: Lucas M. Miller
- Succeeded by: Lucius B. Townsend

Personal details
- Born: March 16, 1824 Potsdam, New York, U.S.
- Died: October 22, 1909 (aged 85) Milwaukee, Wisconsin, U.S.
- Resting place: Riverside Cemetery, Oshkosh, Wisconsin
- Party: Republican; Natl. Union (1860s); Whig (before 1854)
- Spouse: Georgiana Enery (m. 1854; died 1901)
- Children: George H. Gary^{(b. 1856; died 1877)}; Ann Eliza Gary^{(b. 1858; died 1862)}; Paul Gary^{(b. 1860; died 1945)}; Mary Francis (Rieckhoff)^{(b. 1868; died 1905)}
- Relatives: Joseph Gary (brother)
- Profession: Lawyer

George Gary (March 16, 1824 – October 22, 1909) was an American lawyer, newspaper editor, Republican politician, and Wisconsin pioneer. He was a member of the Wisconsin Senate (1867) and State Assembly (1854 & 1855), representing Winnebago County. He also served 12 years as county judge and authored a long-cited and re-issued work on Wisconsin probate law.

== Early life ==
George Gary was born March 16, 1824, in Potsdam, New York. When two years old, his eyes became severely inflamed, which lasted for much of his childhood and limited his ability to obtain an education. At age five, he moved with his parents to Clinton, Clinton County, New York, where he received his early education. Later in childhood, the family relocated to Keeseville, New York, where Gary received an academy education.

Attaining adulthood, a physician recommended that a sea voyage might improve his eye inflammation. Gary quickly signed up to crew a Nantucket whaling ship, and traveled the Atlantic Ocean from 1845 through 1847. He returned home with the inflammation reduced and his overall health significantly improved, though he suffered from poor health for his entire life. After returning to New York, he taught school for three years, then moved out west to the new state of Wisconsin in 1850.

He settled in what is now the city of Oshkosh, Wisconsin, in June 1850. At the time, the settlement had not yet been incorporated as a city. Despite having little professional experience, he was quickly employed as a clerk in a shipping and forwarding business of William Albert Knapp, then went to work as cashier and bookkeeper for the steamboat line of Fitzgerald and Moore, which then included all the steamboats operating on Lake Winnebago and the Wolf and Fox rivers.

== Public office ==
In Oshkosh, Gary became involved in politics with the Whig Party. He was active in campaigning for the Whig ticket during the 1852 United States presidential election then ran for city clerk in the Spring of 1853—the first election of Oshkosh under city government. He lost that election, but later that year ran for Wisconsin State Assembly and was elected on the Whig Party ticket. During 1854, the Republican Party was founded at Ripon, Wisconsin, from delegates of the Whig and Free Soil parties; Gary ran for re-election in 1854 on the Republican Party ticket and faced no opposition candidate. He served in the 1854 and 1855 legislative sessions, representing Winnebago County's 1st Assembly district, which then comprised Oshkosh and the southern half of the county.

While at the capitol in Madison, Wisconsin, he became involved with Horace Rublee, the owner of the Wisconsin State Journal, and bought in as a part owner. His association with the State Journal lasted a little over a year. Afterward, Gary returned to freight forwarding as a clerk for a company in Green Bay, but that business was soon ruined by a temporary suspension of navigation on the lower Fox River in the fall of 1856. He then returned to Oshkosh, and worked in the forwarding business in partnership with M. E. Tremble.

In the fall of 1857, Gary won a special election to serve as Wisconsin circuit court clerk in Winnebago County. He was subsequently elected to a full term the following April. He declined renomination in 1860. During his last year as clerk, he also became the owner of the Oshkosh Democrat newspaper, and, in December 1860, merged his paper with the Oshkosh Northwestern, becoming a minority owner in the new merged paper and remaining on as editor for the next several years.

While serving as court clerk, Gary also dedicated himself to studying law, and he was admitted to the bar on April 17, 1861. The following year, he was appointed federal revenue assessor for the fifth district of Wisconsin. He held that post until April 1865, when he resigned due to poor health after a case of Diphtheria. About a year later, he left the Northwestern and sold his remaining stake in the paper.

He soon returned to elected office, winning a seat in the Wisconsin Senate in 1866, running on the National Union ticket. He defeated Harlow S. Orton, who was nominated by the Democratic Party. Gary participated in all of the Senate business of the 1867 legislative session, but resigned in October of that year after he received another federal appointment. He served the next two years as register of bankruptcy.

He resigned that office in 1869 after he was elected county judge. He took office as judge in January 1870 and was subsequently re-elected in 1873, 1877, and 1881. He resigned in April 1882, saying that the annual salary for a county judge, then $2,000, was insufficient. (Note: $2,000 in 1882 equates to about $60,000 adjusted for inflation to 2023.) While serving as county judge—an office which was mostly devoted to probate court cases—Gary wrote a guide of forms and procedures known as Wisconsin Probate Law and Practice, which was extensively utilized throughout the state and in some neighboring states. He published an updated version in 1892, and further editions were reissued after his death.

For the rest of his professional career, he was engaged as an attorney. He practiced in Oshkosh in partnership with several lawyers over the next 20 years, and retired in 1903.

== Personal life and family ==
George Gary was the second of five children born to Eli Bush Gary and his wife Frances O. (née Easton). Eli Gary was a carpenter and joiner who served as a volunteer in the War of 1812. Both parents ultimately also moved to Wisconsin. George Gary's older brother was Joseph Gary, who had a notable career as a state court judge in Illinois.

George Gary married Georgiana Enery on August 24, 1854, at Berlin, Wisconsin. They had four children together, though two died young.

Gary fell into a difficult financial situation in his later years, no longer able to work. He went to Milwaukee in 1903 to live with his daughter, Mary Francis, and her four small children. Mary Francis died in 1905, and Gary took charge of the children until suffering a stroke in 1906, after which he was nearly blind and suffered from partial paralysis. A trained nurse, Alice Pennock, came to assist the family later that year and took over the care of Gary and his grandchildren. This continued for three years, as Gary's condition continued to deteriorate. He slipped into unconsciousness on October 15, 1909, and died on October 22.

== Published works ==
Gary, George (1879). Wisconsin Probate Law and Practice.

== Notes ==
Wisconsin State Assembly
Preceded by Lucas M. Miller	Member of the Wisconsin State Assembly from the Winnebago 1st district January 2, 1854 – January 7, 1856	Succeeded by Lucius B. Townsend
Wisconsin Senate
Preceded by George S. Barnum	Member of the Wisconsin Senate from the 21st district January 7, 1867 – October 1867	Succeeded by William G. Ritch
Legal offices
Preceded by Jedediah H. Smalley	Wisconsin Circuit Court Clerk for Winnebago County, Wisconsin; November 1857 – January 1, 1861	Succeeded by William G. Ritch
Preceded by Joseph B. Hamilton	County Judge of Winnebago County, Wisconsin; January 1, 1870 – April 1, 1882	Succeeded by Joseph B. Hamilton
