= George S. Barnum =

19th century American politician

Member of the Wisconsin Senate from the 21st district
- In office January 2, 1865 – January 7, 1867
- Preceded by: Joseph B. Hamilton
- Succeeded by: George Gary

Member of the Wisconsin State Assembly from the Winnebago 3rd district
- In office January 4, 1864 – January 2, 1865
- Preceded by: Emery F. Davis
- Succeeded by: William Simmons
- In office January 2, 1860 – January 7, 1861
- Preceded by: George W. Beckwith
- Succeeded by: Armine Pickett

Personal details
- Born: September 26, 1819 Monkton, Vermont, U.S.
- Died: November 20, 1893 (aged 74) Winneconne, Wisconsin, U.S.
- Resting place: Winneconne Village Cemetery, Winneconne, Wisconsin
- Party: Republican
- Spouse: Mary Pierce Kinsley (m. 1842–1893)
- Children: Mary B. (Enos)^{(b. 1844; died 1907)}; Jerome William Barnum^{(b. 1846; died 1937)}

George Stone Barnum (September 26, 1819 – November 20, 1893) was an American businessman, Republican politician, and Wisconsin pioneer. He served in both houses of the Wisconsin Legislature, representing Winnebago County in the Wisconsin Senate during the 1865 and 1866 sessions, and in the State Assembly during the 1860 and 1864 sessions.

== Biography ==
George S. Barnum was born in Monkton, Vermont, in September 1819.

He moved west to the Wisconsin Territory in the mid-1840s, settling initially in Fond du Lac County. He established a farm, but soon gave up that work to start a merchant business. He moved to a nearby settlement in the vicinity of what is now Waukau, Wisconsin, where he remained until 1868. For most of that time he was involved in milling in partnership with several other investors.

Shortly after his arrival, in 1847, this area was set off as the town of Rushford. At the first election of the town of Rushford, Barnum was elected as the first town assessor. He held the office again in 1848. In 1850, the territory was further divided, and the area of Barnum's residence became part of the new town of Nepeuskun. At the first election of the town of Nepeuskun, Barnum was elected the first town clerk and assessor, and was also elected the first superintendent of schools.

Barnum first ran for state office in 1859, running on the Republican Party ticket for Wisconsin State Assembly in Winnebago County's 3rd Assembly district. At the time his district comprised most of the southern half of Winnebago County. He faced no Democratic opponent in the general election and went on to represent the district in the 1860 legislative session. After his term in the Assembly, he was appointed to the board of the State Reform School, but resigned after a year. He was elected to another term in the Assembly in 1863, running on the National Union ticket. He ran again in the same district and again faced no Democratic opposition.

In 1864, he was elected to the Wisconsin Senate, running on the National Union ticket. He represented the 21st Senate district in the 1865 and 1866 legislative sessions. His Senate district then comprised all of Winnebago County.

After his term in the Senate, Barnum moved to the nearby village of Winneconne, Wisconsin, where he remained for the rest of his life. There he was involved in dealing real estate and mortgages.

== Personal life and family ==
George S. Barnum was the sixth of seven known children of Job Vassell Barnum and his first wife Zillah (née Van Horne). The Barnum family were descended from Thomas Barnum, who came to the Connecticut Colony from England in the 1600s. George S. Barnum was a fifth cousin of P. T. Barnum, with the colonist Thomas Barnum being their last common ancestor.

George S. Barnum married Mary P. Kinsley on January 6, 1842, at Monkton, Vermont. They had two children together.

George S. Barnum died at Winneconne, Wisconsin, on November 20, 1893.

Wisconsin State Assembly
Preceded by George W. Beckwith	Member of the Wisconsin State Assembly from the Winnebago 3rd district January 2, 1860 – January 7, 1861	Succeeded by Armine Pickett
Preceded by Emery F. Davis	Member of the Wisconsin State Assembly from the Winnebago 3rd district January 4, 1864 – January 2, 1865	Succeeded by William Simmons
Wisconsin Senate
Preceded by Joseph B. Hamilton	Member of the Wisconsin Senate from the 21st district January 2, 1865 – January 7, 1867	Succeeded by George Gary
