= Arminta Victoria Scott Haensler =

American physician, lecturer, author (1842–1931)

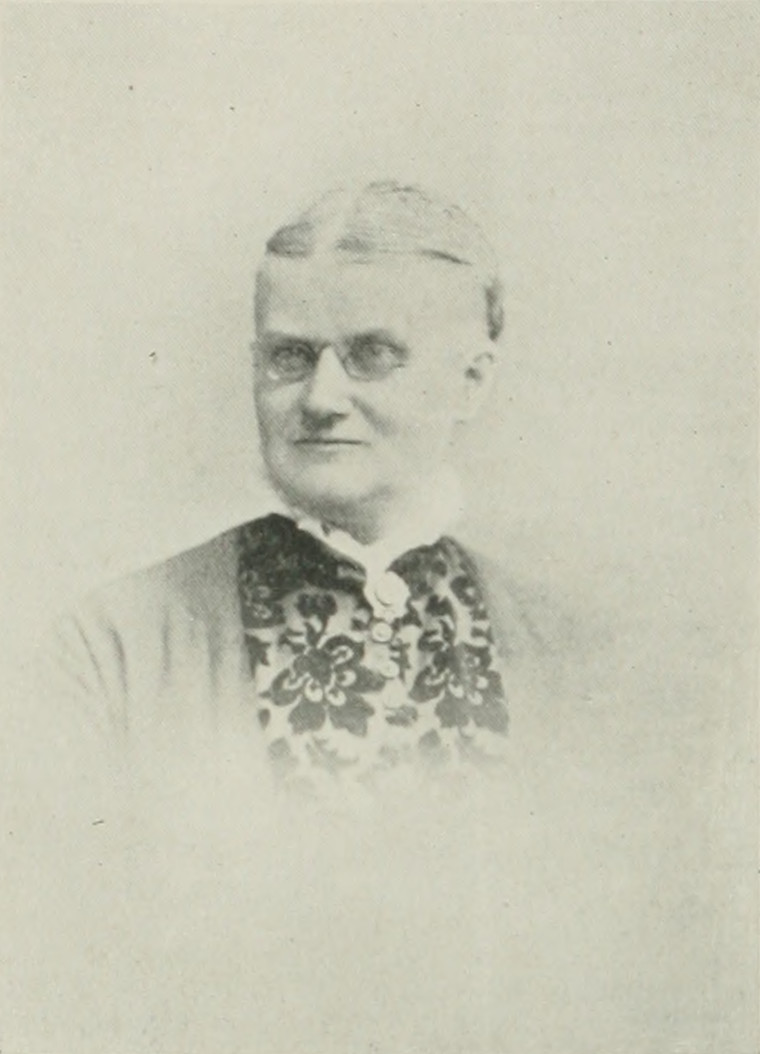
- Portrait photo from A Woman of the Century
- Born: Arminta Victoria Scott; July 27, 1842; Kinsman, Ohio, U.S.
- Died: December 23, 1931 (aged 89); San Diego, California, U.S.
- Education: Woman's Medical College of Pennsylvania
- Occupations: physician; lecturer; author
- Spouse: Franz Joseph Haensler (m. 1890)

Arminta Victoria Scott Haensler (1842–1931) was an American physician, lecturer, and author. In Pennsylvania, she was resident physician to the Mission hospital; gynaecologist to the Stockton sanitarium; consulting gynaecologist to the Pennsylvania asylum for the insane; and consulting physician to the Woman's Christian Association. She served with distinction as lecturer to the Woman's Christian Association; and lecturer to the Working Women's Club.

== Early life and education ==
Arminta Victoria Scott was born in Kinsman, Ohio, July 27, 1842. Her maiden name was Scott, and her parents were of Scotch-American extraction. Her father, a teacher, married one of his pupils. Of this union, Haensler was the third child. She had more trials during her childhood than at any time since, owing to her parents' belief in and practice of "good wholesome restraint" and her own intense dislike of being curbed or controlled. She became converted to Christianity at the age of 11.

At that early age, she showed an excellent memory and an aptitude for mathematics. She entered Kinsman Academy at the age of 14, doing domestic service in the family of a Presbyterian minister for her board. She made rapid progress in study and began to teach when she was 18 years old. Her attention was turned to medicine by reading a newspaper article concerning Elizabeth Blackwell and her trials in securing a medical education. Haensler then determined to be a physician in some large city, and put all her energy into earning the money and preparing herself for the medical profession. She taught for six years.

At the age of 24, she entered the Western Reserve Seminary (West Farmington, Ohio), and a year later, she went to Oberlin College, from which she graduated (1871, Classical, A.B.; 1874, M.A.). There, she helped in household work as an equivalent for her board. After some months, she went to the Ladies' Hall, where, during the rest of the course, she taught both private pupils and college classes. Though she subsequently received the offer of an excellent position, not only as teacher, but as reviewer, editor and reporter, Haensler entered the Woman's Medical College of Pennsylvania, from which, in 1875, she received the degree of M.D.

== Career ==
Since then, Haensler practiced in Philadelphia and at different times, held the positions of resident physician of the Mission Hospital, gynaecologist to the Stockton Sanitarium, consulting gynaecologist to the Pennsylvania Asylum for the Insane, consulting physician to the Woman's Christian Association, lecturer to the Woman's Christian Association, lecturer to the Working Women's Club, member of the Philadelphia Clinical Society, member of the Philadelphia Electro-Therapeutic Society, member of the Alumni Association of the Woman's Medical College of Pennsylvania, resident physician to the Franklin Reformatory Home for Women, physician to the Hospital and Dispensary for Women and Children, and lecturer before the National Woman's Health Association of America.

Haensler was the author of a lecture on Alaska, which area was among the many she visited. She was also the author of several articles on medical topics.

== Personal life ==
On November 13, 1890, she married Franz Joseph Haensler, M.D., of Philadelphia.

For the last 12 years of her life, Haensler resided in San Diego, California, where she died December 23, 1931.
