= Joseph B. Hamilton =

American politician

Joseph B. Hamilton (June 10, 1817 – 1902) was an American teacher, lawyer and judge from Neenah, Wisconsin, who served in the Wisconsin State Senate.

== Background ==
Hamilton was born on June 10, 1817, in Lansing, New York, son of William and Elizabeth (Bower) Hamilton. He was raised on his family's farm, and received a common school education. At the age of 18, he attended the academy in Aurora, Cayuga County, New York, then spent a winter teaching school. For the next seven years he alternated between teaching school and attending Cazenovia Seminary. At 25 he took up the study of law, first with a firm in Genoa, New York, then later with one in Auburn, continuing all the while to teach school. He was admitted to the bar in New York City in April, 1845; and had a legal practice in Mecklenburg, New York, until 1849. In 1847 he married Mary C. Jaycox, of Mecklenburg, who would become the mother of two children before her death in 1854, though neither child survived long.

== In Wisconsin ==
In October 1849 he came to Wisconsin, and settled in Neenah, where he chose to settle. He was the Winnebago County district attorney for 1852-3. He had been a Democrat, but with free soil sympathies; but in 1856 joined the Republican, of which he would remain a local leader throughout his career. He was chairman of the board of supervisors of his town in 1856, and president of the village of Neenah in 1857 and 1858.

== First term in the Senate ==
He was first elected to the Senate in 1862 from the 21st District (Winnebago County) as a Republican, succeeding fellow Republican Samuel M. Hay. He was appointed to the standing committees on the militia, on federal relations, on education, and on internal improvements At the close of the 1864 Senate session, Governor James T. Lewis appointed him as Winnebago County's county judge to fill the vacancy created by the elevation of Judge George W. Washburn. He was succeeded in the Senate by George Barnum, who like Hamilton and most Republicans had adopted the National Union Party label that year.

== After first Senate term; second Senate term ==
He served as Judge from 1864 to 1870, and for about three years of that term lived in Oshkosh. In 1867 he married again, to Mary Aurelia Kimberly, a native of Troy, New York, and graduate of Emma Willard' Troy Female Seminary, now resident in Neenah. The couple were to have one child who lived, a daughter.

Hamilton was elected once more to the Winnebago County Senate seat (now Wisconsin Senate, District 19) in 1880, unseating Democratic incumbent Andrew Haben, with 4,470 votes for Hamilton, 4,049 for Haben, and 529 for former Greenback Assemblyman Milan Ford. He was assigned to the committees on the judiciary, and on town and county affairs. In the next session, he remained on the judiciary committee, but moved to the committee on the assessment and collection of taxes, chairing the latter. In March 1882, he was once more appointed as county judge to serve out an unexpired term caused by the resignation of the incumbent.

Hamilton was not a candidate for re-election to the Senate in 1882, and was succeeded by Democrat Thomas Wall.

== Personal life; death ==
Hamilton was a Freemasonry and held various offices in the Neenah lodge of that order. He was a Methodist, and in his earlier years took an active part in Sunday school work.

His death was reported in the "Recent Deaths" column of the August 1902 issue of The American Lawyer.
