= Elo, Wisconsin =

- Unincorporated community
- Location within Wisconsin Location within the United States
- Coordinates: 43°56′18″N 88°42′22″W
- Country: United States
- State: Wisconsin
- County: Winnebago
- Elevation: 883 ft (269 m)
- Time zone: UTC-6 (Central (CST))
  - Summer (DST): UTC-5 (CDT)
- Area code: 920
- GNIS feature ID: 1577588

Elo is an unincorporated community located in the town of Utica, Winnebago County, Wisconsin, United States. Formerly known as Utica Center, the community was given its current name when the Elo post office was established in February, 1869.
