= Delhi, Wisconsin =

- Ghost Town
- Nickname: Island Park/LaBorde's Landing
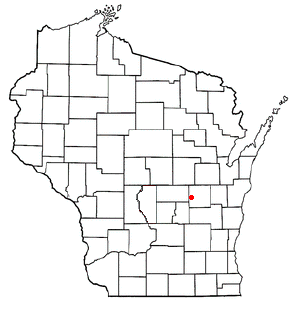
- Location of Delhi, Wisconsin
- Coordinates: 44°01′22″N 88°48′8″W
- Country: United States
- State: Wisconsin
- County: Winnebago
- Elevation: 751 ft (229 m)
- Time zone: UTC-6 (Central (CST))
  - Summer (DST): UTC-5 (CDT)

Delhi, Wisconsin is a ghost town in the town of Rushford, Winnebago County, Wisconsin, United States. It is located on County Highway E between Omro and Eureka at the junction of the Fox River and Waukau Creek. Delhi was also known as La Borde's Landing. 1890 census records identify Delhi as Island Park. Delhi had an established post office between 1850 and 1893.

== History ==
Delhi was founded by Luke La Borde, a French Canadian trader. La Borde patented the site of 145 acres on March 1, 1848. The site was expanded after the sale of initial lots. A land survey was made on July 17, 1849. The lots were uniform in measurement, 66 feet wide by 132 feet deep. The main street of Broadway measured 82 1/2 feet wide. All other streets were 66 feet wide. Water, Union, Washington, Liberty, Grand, Ann, Broad, Harrison, Howard, Pearl, Main, and Menominee streets are listed in a Winnebago County platbook dated 1889.

The site was used by regional Indians as a burial ground. The settlers of Delhi often found the Indian burials while spring plowing. Their findings included pottery, beads, guns, copper, and other objects.

Delhi was a preferred trading post for the local Indians and residents of Eureka and Omro. La Borde built a float bridge for the use of Poygan, Winneconne, and Rushford settlers on their way to the gristmills at Waukau. In addition to being a trading post, Delhi had 3 stores, 2 grain mills, 3 hop mills and hop press, and a saw mill. Boats and furniture were crafted in Delhi. It had a livery, a schoolhouse, a 22-room hotel, and a bar. The hops were grown and pressed in Delhi then shipped to Oshkosh and Milwaukee. Years later, a dock was built. Steamboats made regular stops in Delhi. A small stagecoach from Oshkosh to Omro, Eureka, and other locations stopped daily in Delhi delivering passengers and mail.

Delhi was slowly abandoned and then deteriorated. It had considered itself to be a strong contender for county seat over Omro and Eureka. Trade shifted to Omro and Eureka when those villages built better bridges than Delhi could afford. The railroad came to Omro causing further diversion of trade. Delhi's residents moved to the neighboring villages and beyond.

Today, only one deteriorated house stands from that era. Luke La Borde and his wife, Louisa, are buried on the property.
