= Kinsman, Ohio =

- Census-designated place
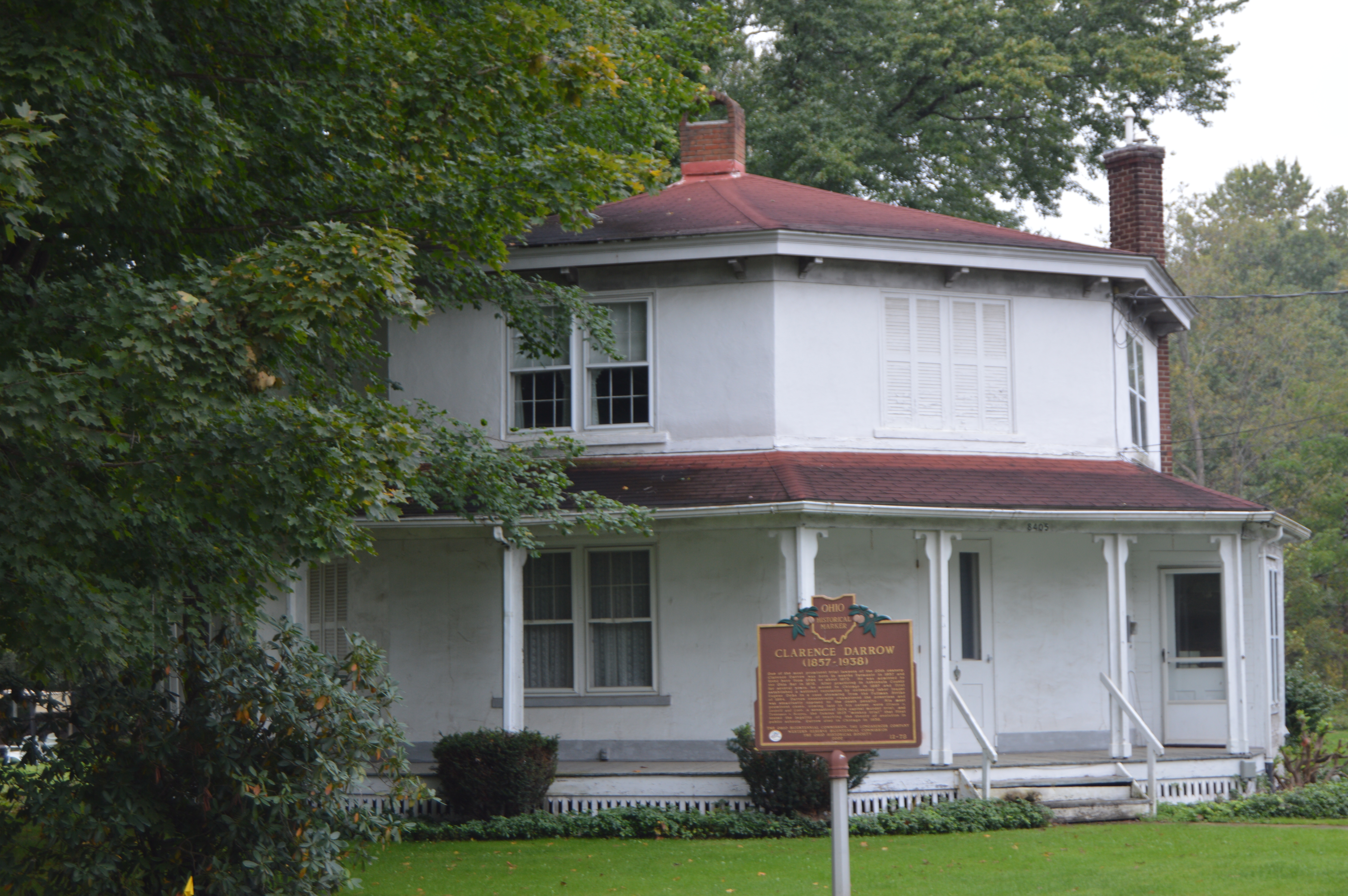
- Clarence Darrow Octagon House

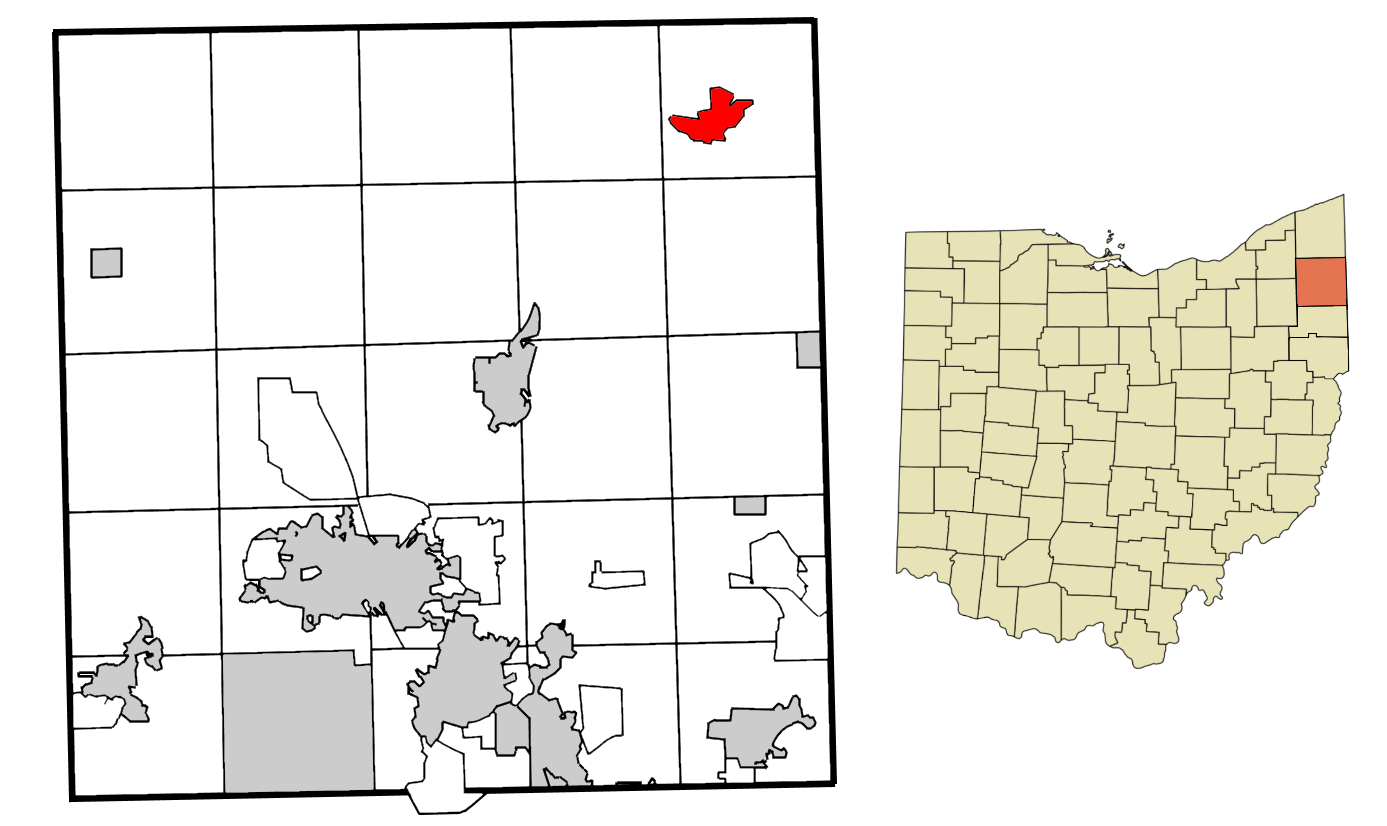
- Location of Kinsman in Trumbull County, Ohio.
- Coordinates: 41.445752°N 80.588371°W
- Country: United States
- State: Ohio
- County: Trumbull
- Township: Kinsman

Area
  - Total: 2.20 sq mi (5.71 km^{2})
  - Land: 2.20 sq mi (5.69 km^{2})
  - Water: 0.0077 sq mi (0.02 km^{2})
- Elevation: 971 ft (296 m)

Population (2020)
  - Total: 574
  - Density: 261.1/sq mi (100.83/km^{2})
- FIPS code: 39-40507
- GNIS feature ID: 2584365
- Website: kinsmantownship.org

Historical population
Census	Pop.	Note	%±
2010	616		—
2020	574		−6.8%
U.S. Decennial Census

Kinsman (also known as Kinsman Center) is an unincorporated community and census-designated place in Kinsman Township, Trumbull County, Ohio, United States. The population was 574 at the 2020 census. It is part of the Youngstown–Warren metropolitan area.

Kinsman lies at the intersection of State Route 5 and State Route 7 between Williamsfield and Burghill. It is named for John Kinsman, a land agent. Kinsman has a post office with the ZIP code 44428; as well as a library, the Kinsman Free Public Library.

== Notable people ==
- Christopher Barzak, speculative and young-adult novelist
- Philip Bliss, hymn composer and abolitionist
- Leigh Brackett, pioneer science-fiction author
- Clarence Darrow, prominent lawyer who represented trade union causes and criminal defendants
- Milan Ford, Wisconsin farmer and legislator
- Edmond Hamilton, science-fiction author
- Arminta Victoria Scott Haensler, physician, lecturer, and author
- Bill McKinley, American League umpire
