= Pickett, Wisconsin =

- Unincorporated community
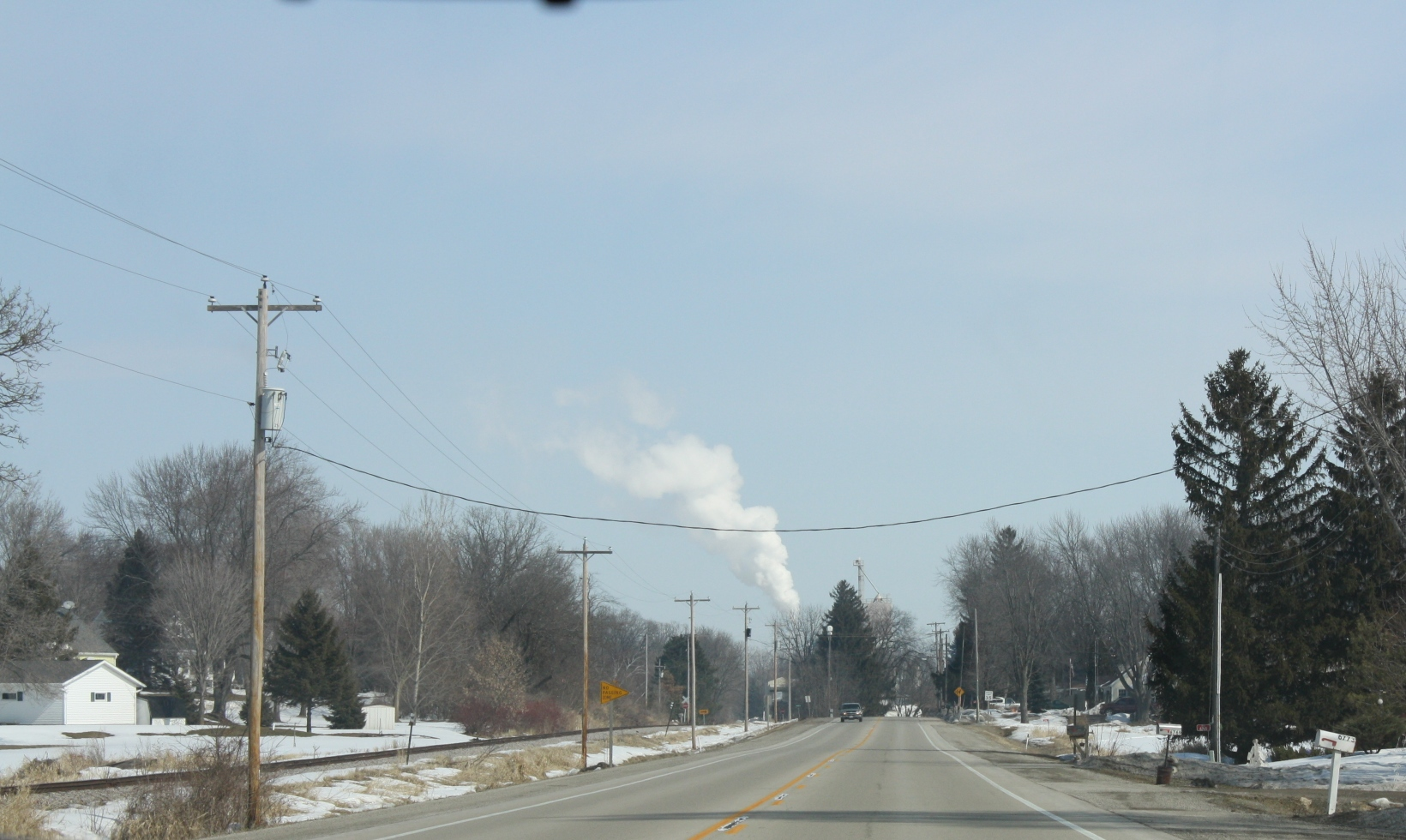
- Looking north at Pickett on WIS 44

- Location within Wisconsin Location within the United States
- Coordinates: 43°54′41″N 88°43′47″W
- Country: United States
- State: Wisconsin
- County: Winnebago
- Elevation: 889 ft (271 m)
- Time zone: UTC-6 (Central (CST))
  - Summer (DST): UTC-5 (CDT)
- ZIP code: 54964
- Area code: 920
- GNIS feature ID: 1571335

Pickett is an unincorporated community in Winnebago County, Wisconsin, United States. Situated in the southwestern part of the county, Pickett is located on Wisconsin Highway 44 between Ripon and Oshkosh, in the town of Utica. Pickett has a post office with ZIP code 54964.

== History ==
The community was originally named along with its post office as Welaunee or Weelaunee in May 1850, however it was later renamed Pickett's Station after Armine Pickett, an early settler and land owner who also served in the Wisconsin State Assembly during the early 1860s. The name change to Pickett's Station occurred in the 1870s, with the completion of construction of the railroad. Finally, the name was changed to present-day Pickett in the year 1883.

== Images ==
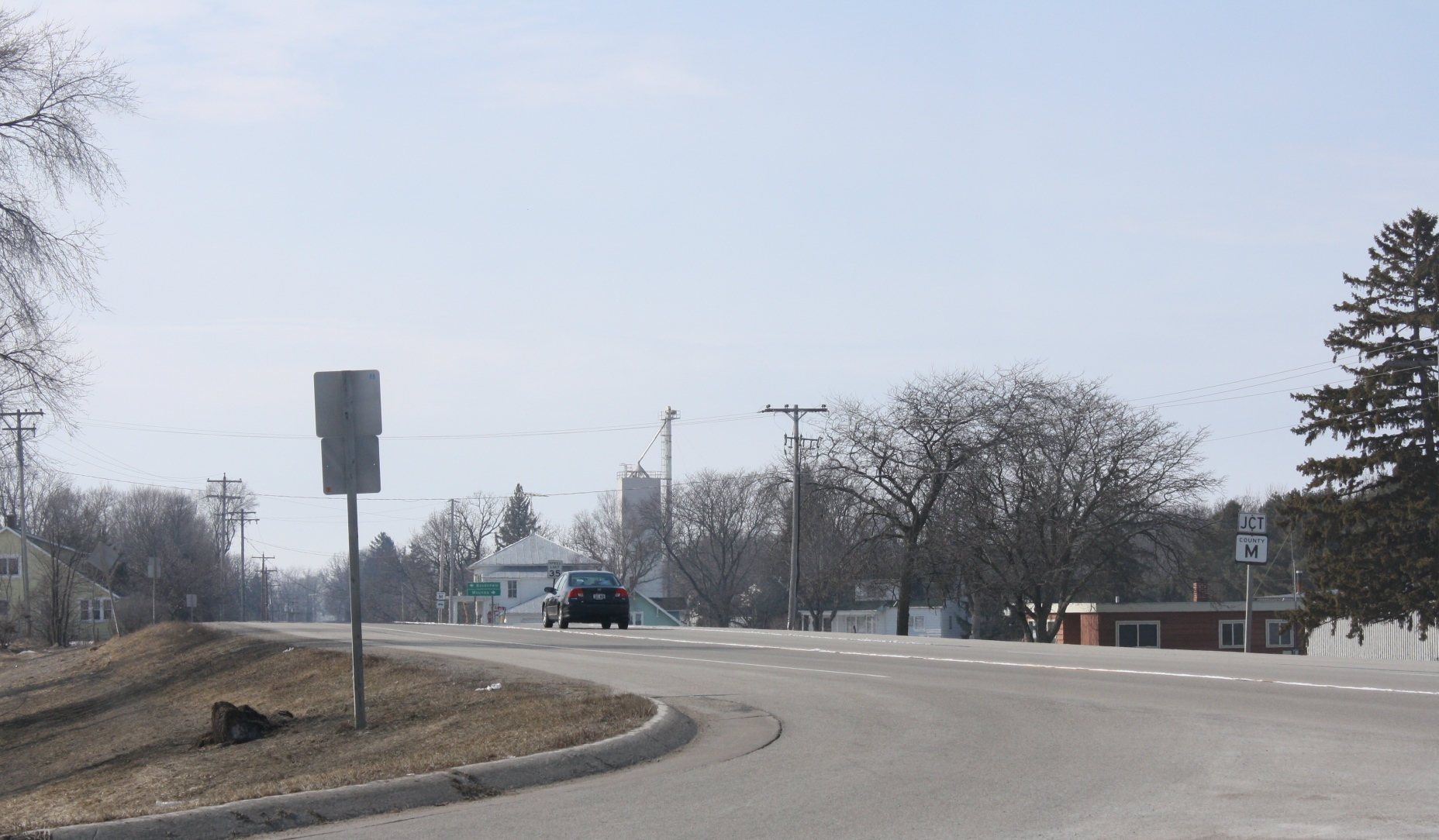
Looking south

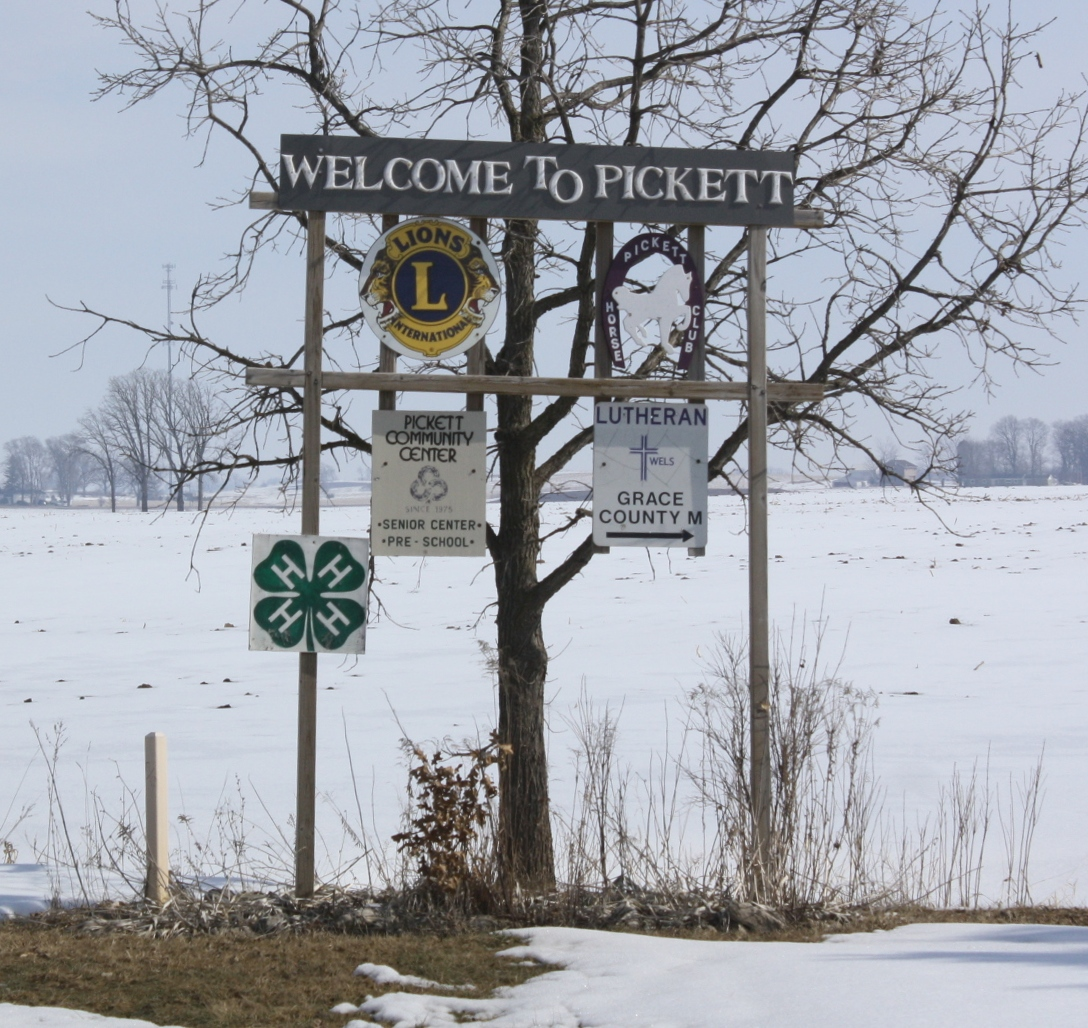
Welcome sign
