= Eureka, Winnebago County, Wisconsin =

Census-designated place in Wisconsin, United States

Eureka, Wisconsin
- Census-designated place
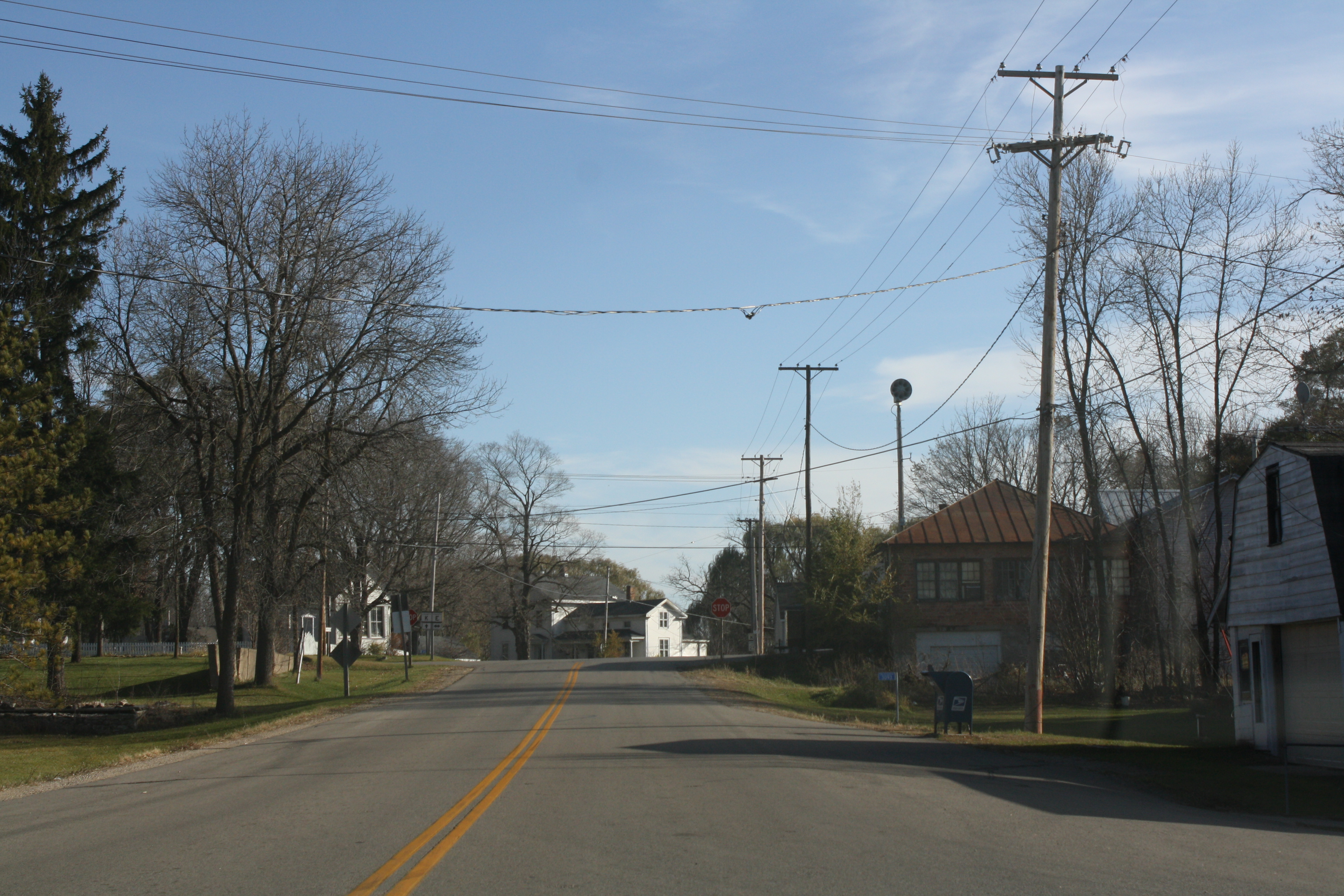
- Looking southerly in downtown Eureka

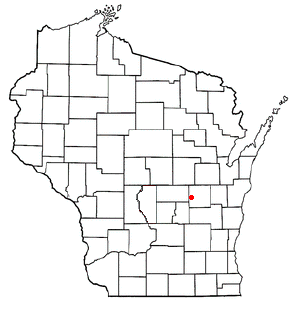
- Location of Eureka, Wisconsin
- Coordinates: 44°00′16″N 88°50′30″W
- Country: United States
- State: Wisconsin
- County: Winnebago

Area
  - Total: 1.071 sq mi (2.77 km^{2})
  - Land: 1.024 sq mi (2.65 km^{2})
  - Water: 0.047 sq mi (0.12 km^{2})
- Elevation: 743 ft (226 m)

Population (2020)
  - Total: 247
  - Density: 241/sq mi (93.1/km^{2})
- Time zone: UTC-6 (Central (CST))
  - Summer (DST): UTC-5 (CDT)
- Zip Code: 54934
- Area code: 920
- FIPS code: 55-24475
- GNIS feature ID: 2586486

Eureka is an unincorporated census-designated place in the town of Rushford, in Winnebago County, Wisconsin, United States. It is located on the Fox River at the intersection of county highways K & E, southwest of Omro. At the 2020 census, its population was 247.

== History ==
Eureka is situated on the south bank of the Fox River. Lester Rounds moved his stock of goods from Waukau to the site of Eureka in 1850, where he was joined by Walton C. Dickerson, who moved from Nepeuskun. They became the first settlers and founders of Eureka, a plot of which was recorded on 24 July 1850, of which Rounds, Dickerson and Starr were proprietors. A ferry was established across the Fox River at this point, during the same season, and four years later a bridge was constructed. The post office was authorized on 16 July 1850 and Lester Rounds was appointed postmaster. A steamboat landing and warehouse was built by Dickerson for the accommodation of the daily line of steamboats on the river, running between Oshkosh and Berlin. The sawmills along the river at Eureka, Delhi, Omro and Berlin were supplied with pine logs from the Wolf River, which were towed up the Fox River at first by horsepower boats or tugs.

== Demographics ==
Historical population
Census	Pop.	Note	%±
2000	129		—
2010	220		70.5%
2020	247		12.3%
U.S. Decennial Census

At the 2000 census, the population of Eureka was 129, 71 male and 58 female with a median age of 31.9, 7% under 5 years, 73.6% 18 years and over, and 11.6% 65 years and over.

The racial make-up was 98.4% White, 0.8% Native American, and 0.8% some other race. Hispanic or Latino of any race were 1.6% of the population.

Average household size was 2.58. Average family size was 3.18. There were 57 housing units, 87.7% occupied. Of those occupied, 90% were owner-occupied, 10% renter occupied.

The population 25 years and older was 64, 85.9% a high school graduate or higher. Civilian veteran population was 10.3%. Disability status of the population 5 years and over was 25.8%.

Married male, except separated, population 15 years and over was 56.1%. Married female, except separated, population 15 years and over was 70.3%.

The population, 16 and over, in the labor force was 75.6%. Mean travel time to work for workers 16 and over was 23 minutes. The median household income was $33.125 and median family income was $47.500. Per capita income was $17,099. 8.3% families and 12.8% individuals were below the poverty level.

There were 35 single-family owner-occupied homes with a median value of $77,100. The median of selected monthly owner costs with a mortgage was $721, not mortgaged was $250.

== Culture ==
Eureka was the setting for the RKO Radio Pictures film, All Mine to Give.

Rusty’s Soap Works, a living history museum showcasing soap making and black smithing is located in Eureka.

== People of interest ==
Twenty-seven-year-old E. R. Jaeger, from Eureka, Wisconsin, followed his brother west to Tacoma, Washington, at the end of the 19th century, where he worked in his brother's laundry. In fall 1894, he decided to go out on his own, to either Alaska or Hawaii. He tossed a coin and Alaska won. The Alaska Laundry Co. continues in the family in Juneau. Jaeger's coin flip left the field open for Servco Pacific, a diversified company founded in 1919, to become the oldest family business in Hawaii.

Argalus J. and Augustus I. Foote constructed the Foote Mansion in Eureka. It had 30 rooms. The floor plan was of two mirrored sets of 15 rooms with a great hall in the center. Local folklore claims the Foote Mansion is haunted and that Al Capone used it as a whiskey distillery during prohibition.

== Images ==
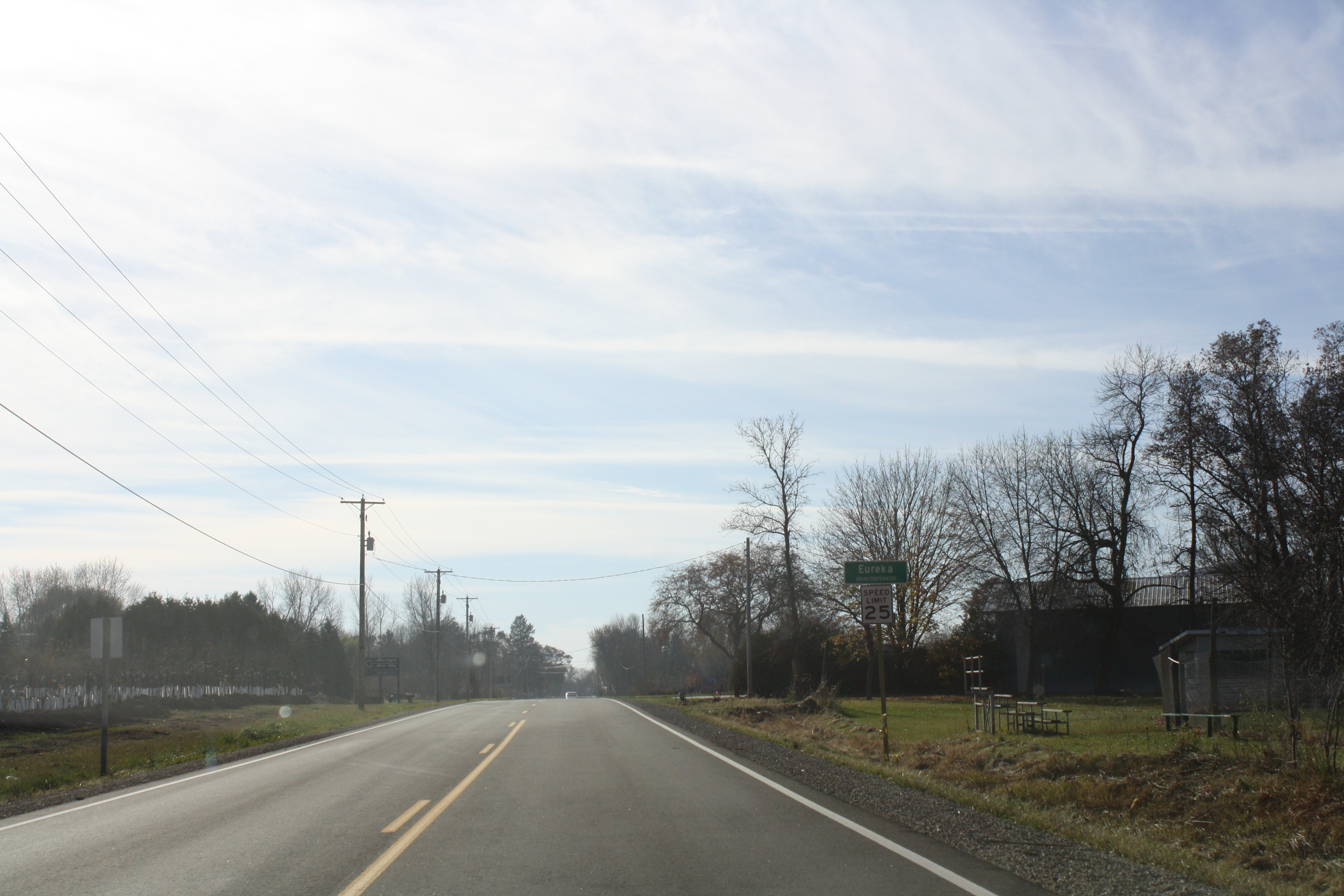
Welcome sign

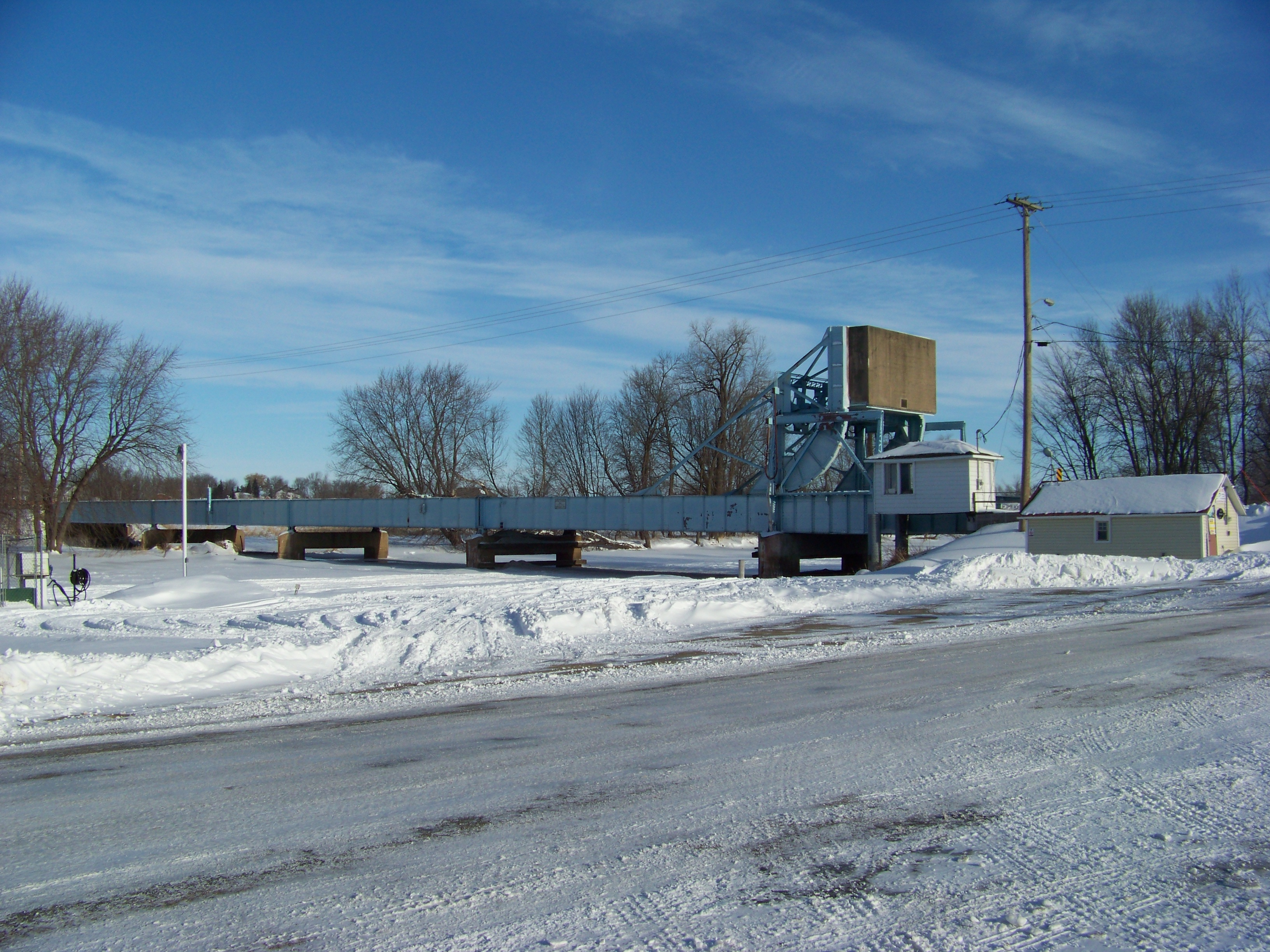
Lift Bridge over Fox River

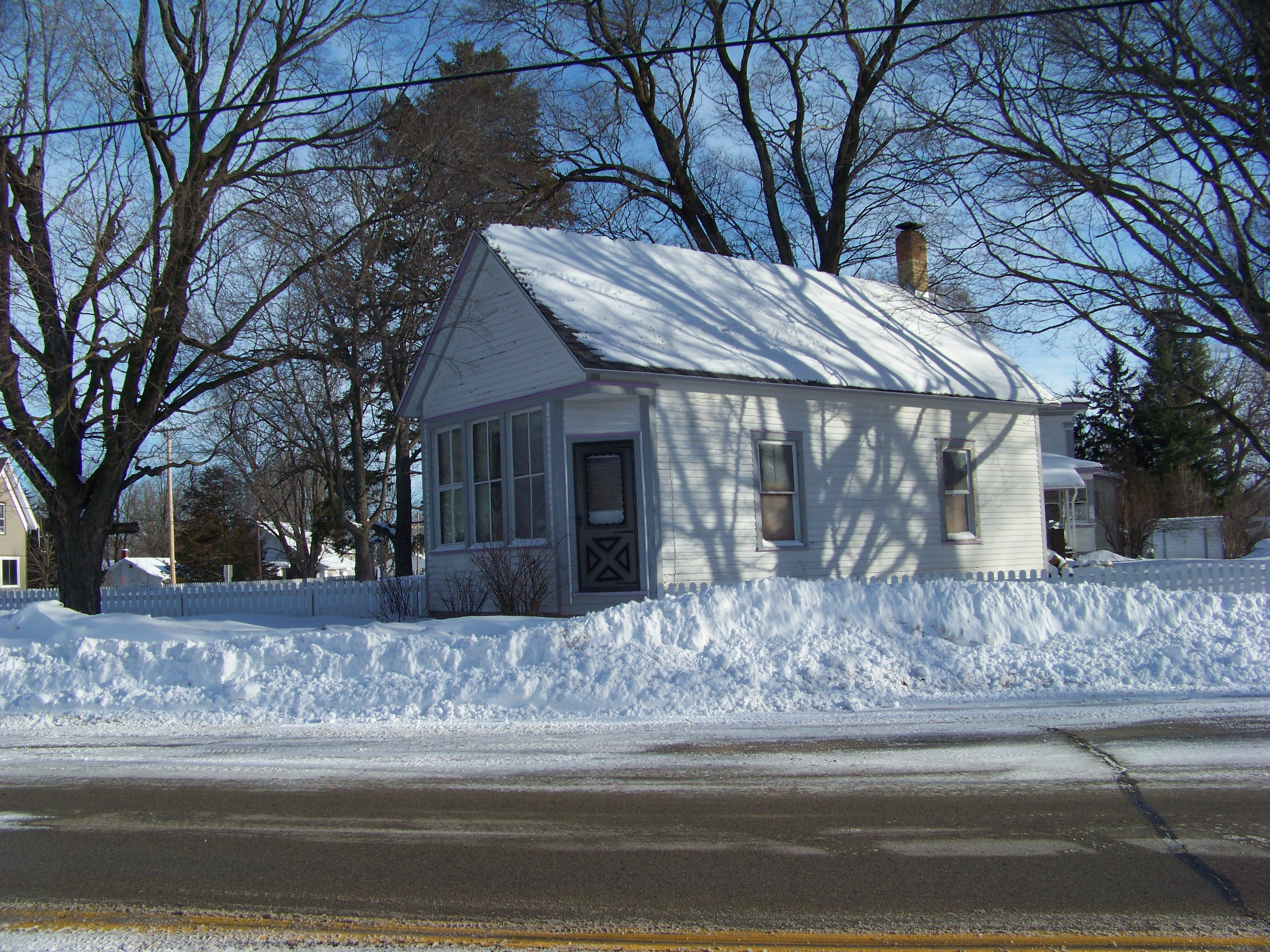
The Old Post Office

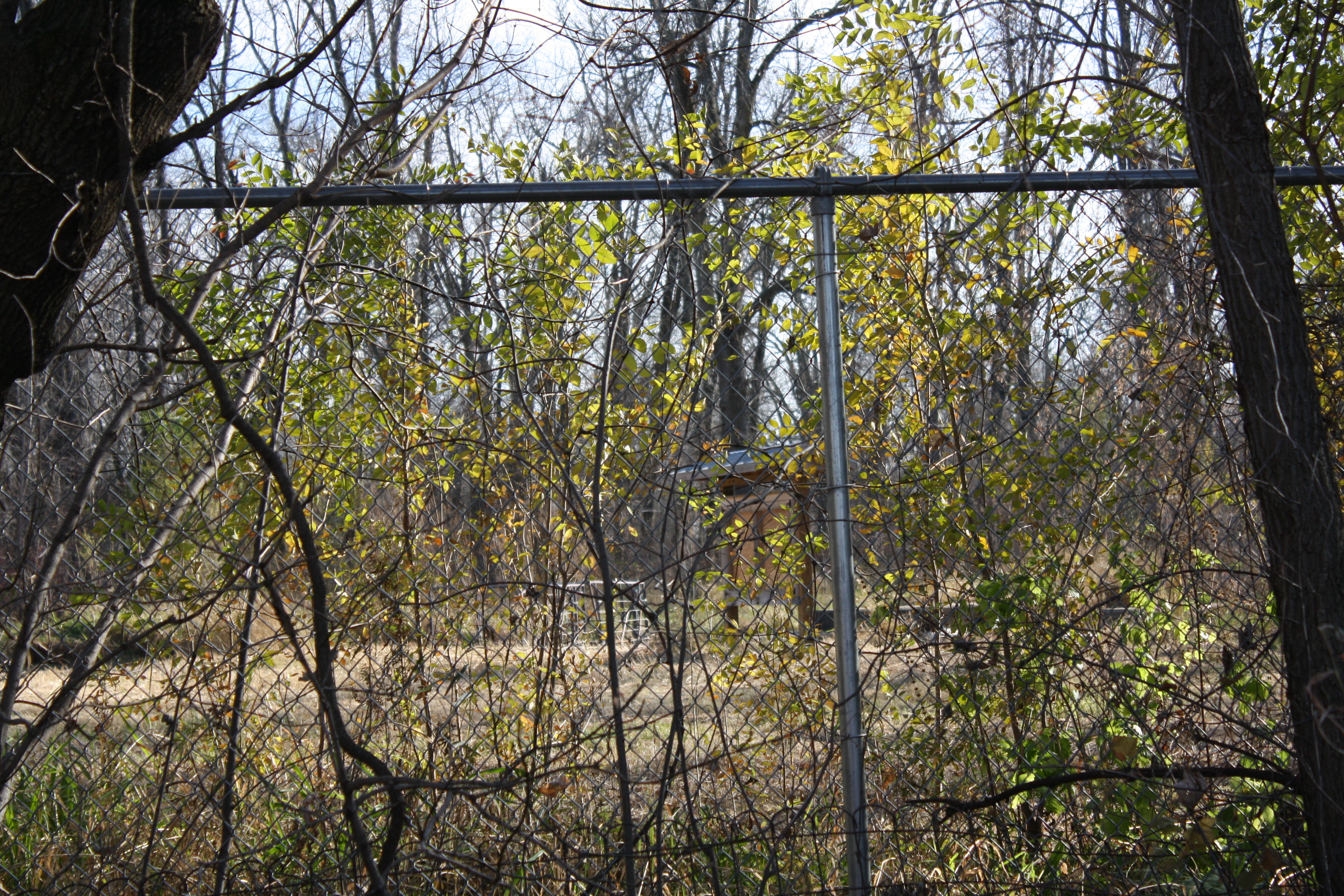
The Eureka Lock and Lock Tender's House on the Fox River, listed on the National Register of Historic Places

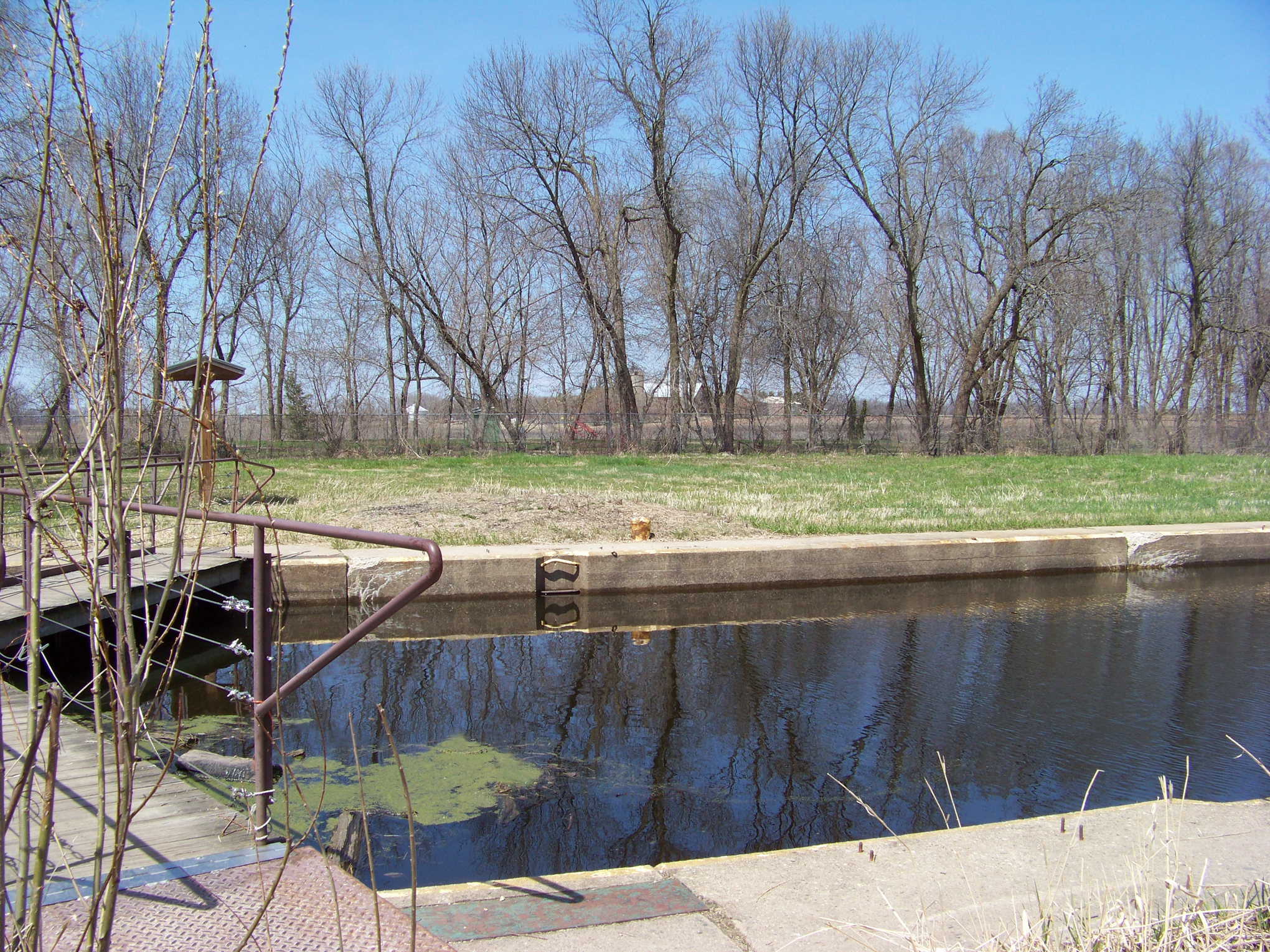
Eureka Lock and Lock Tender's House, listed on the National Register of Historic Places

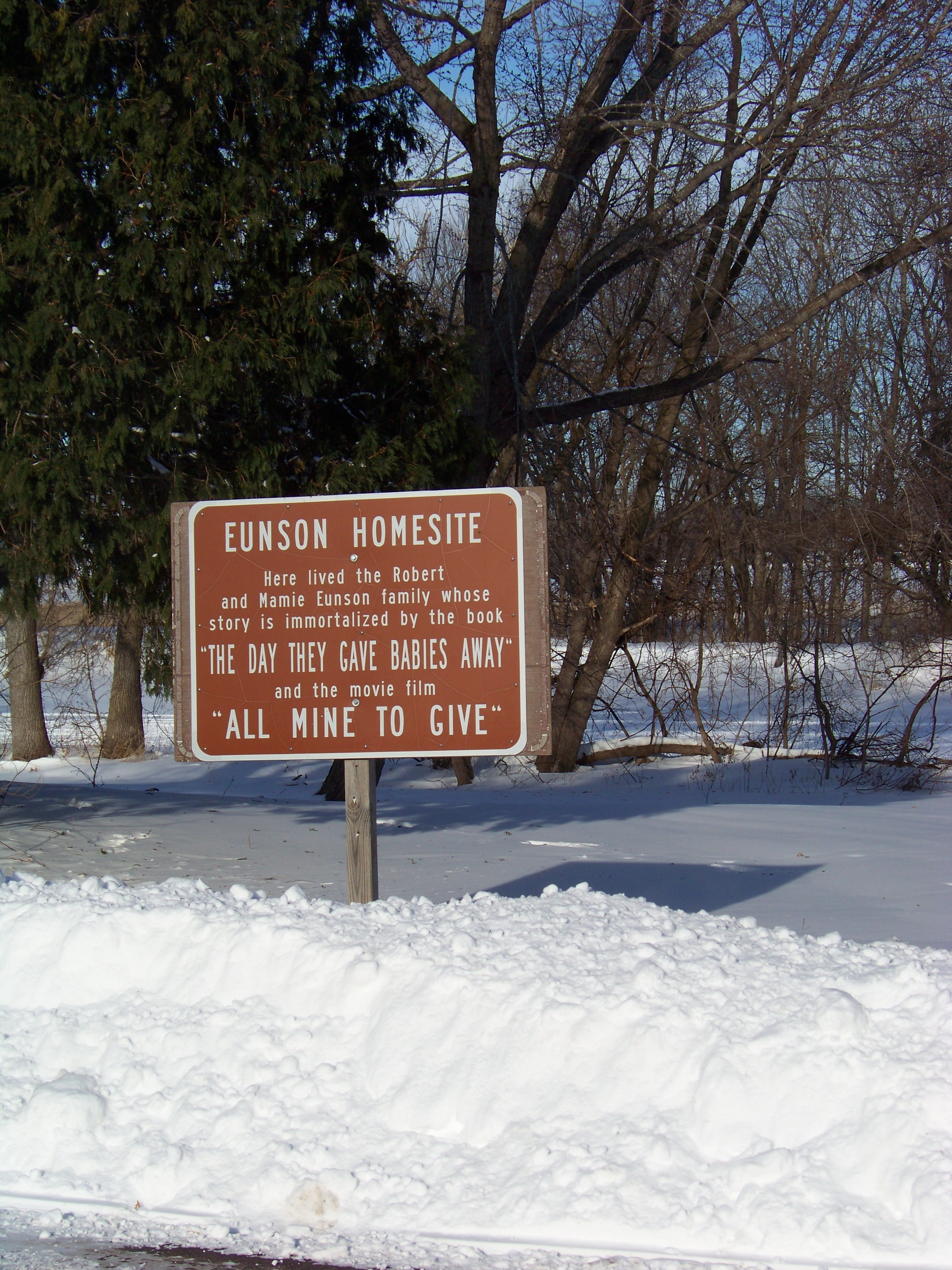
Eunson Home Site on the Fox River

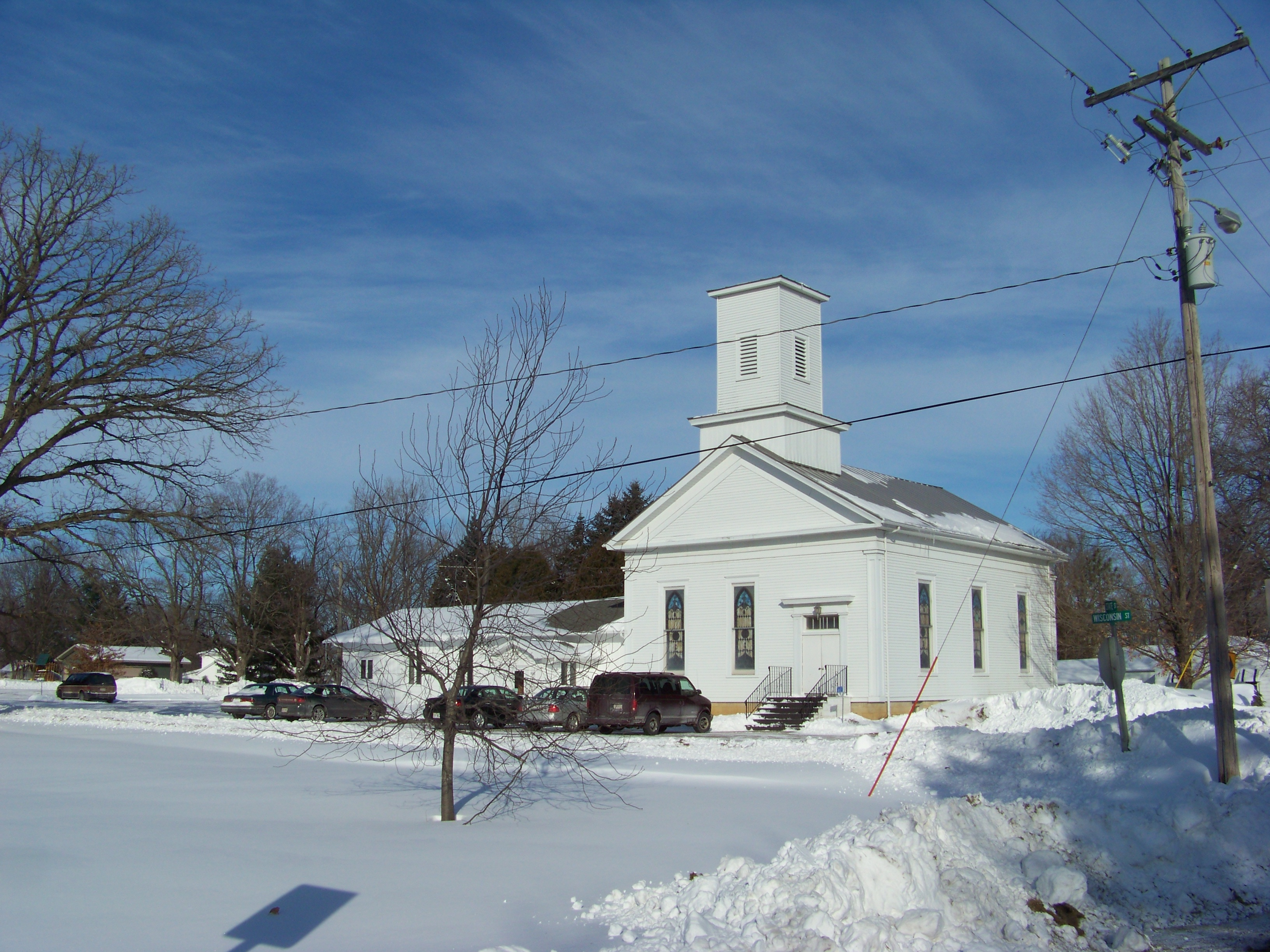
Eureka United Methodist Church (est. 1868)

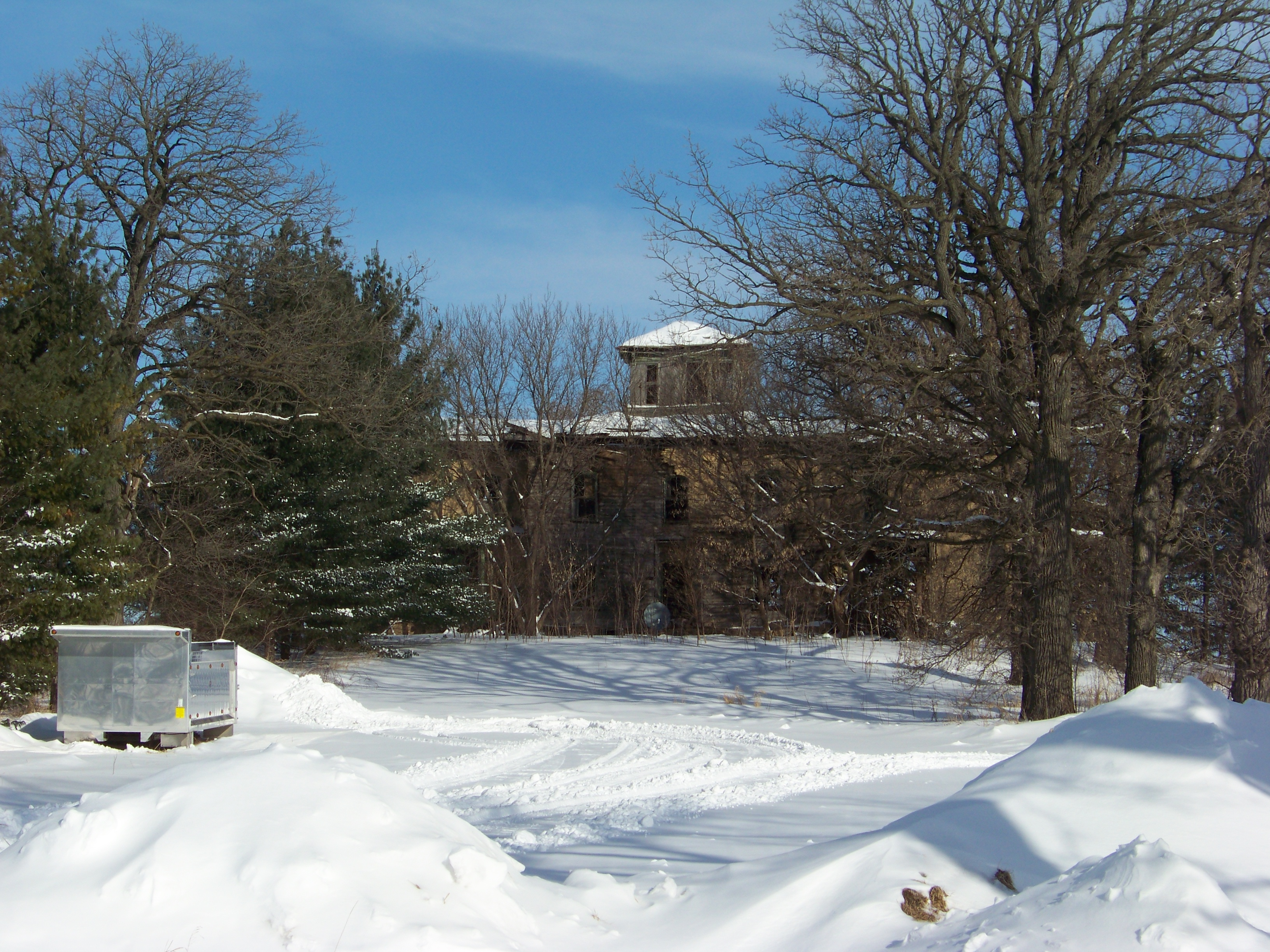
Foote Mansion

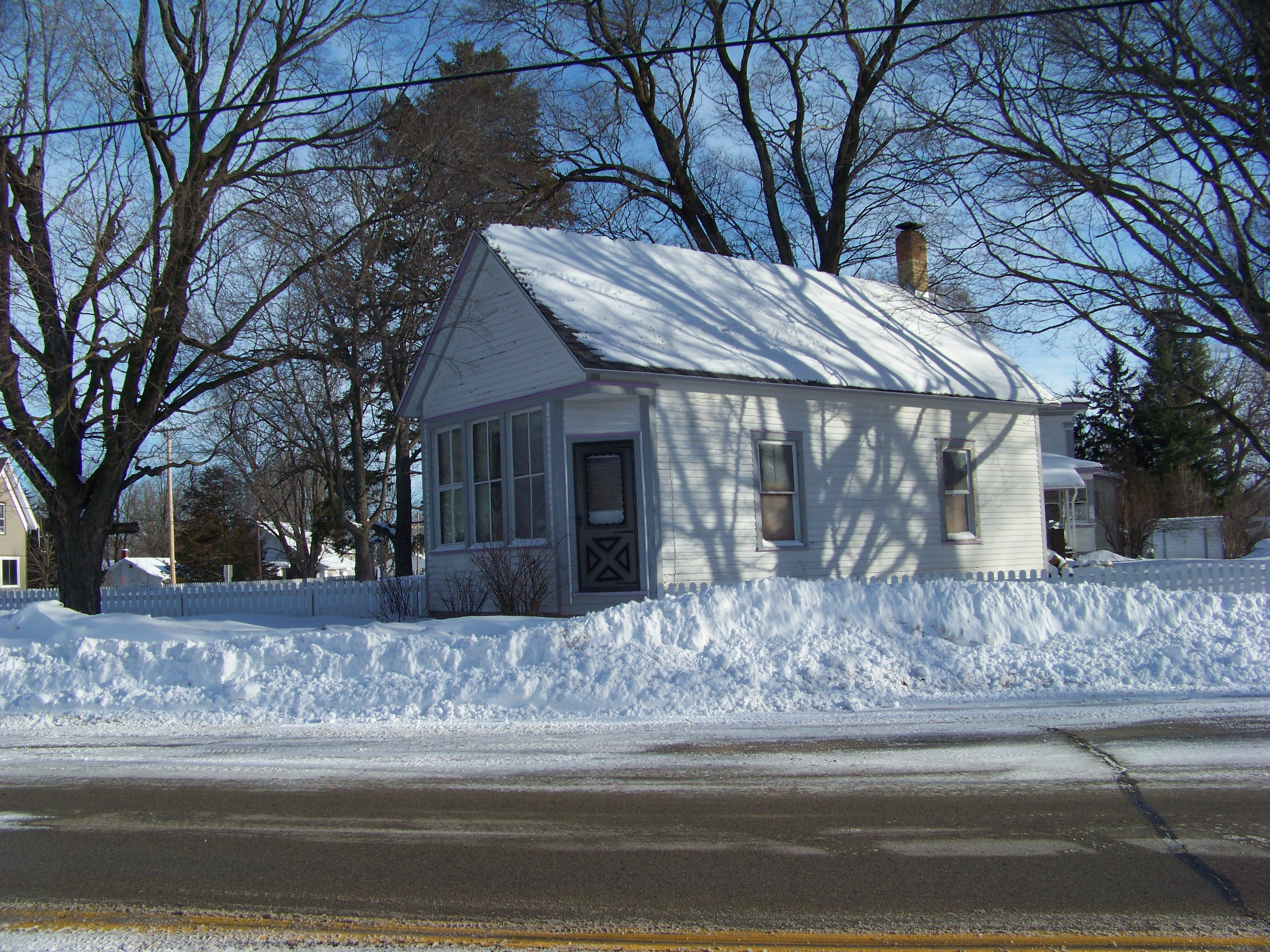
The Old Post Office
