= David Marks Bean =

American politician

David Marks Bean (March 30, 1832 – January 23, 1884) was an American minister.

Bean, the only son of Daniel Q and Ann (Trickey), was born in Tamworth, N.H., March 30, 1832. He entered Yale College from Sandwich, N. H. and graduated in 1858.

In 1858-9, he taught in Stamford, Conn. During 1860-62, he studied in the Andover Theological Seminary, and in 1863 began preaching at Groton Junction (now Ayer), Massachusetts, where he was ordained July 23, 1863. On June 28, 1864, he was installed over the Congregational Church in South Maiden (now Everett), Massachusetts, where he continued until his resignation, October 1, 1867. During the preceding winter he served as a member of the Connecticut Legislature. In December 1868, he was installed pastor of the Congregational Church in Webster, Mass. Becoming seriously ill in December 1870, he resigned his pastorate in May following. In December 1871, he went to Europe, and after visiting also Egypt and Palestine returned in September, 1872. In May 1873, he took charge of the Congregational Church in South Framingham, Mass. Soon after his reluctant withdrawal from professional work in July 1879, he was elected Superintendent of Schools for the town. He resigned this position, also, in consequence of pulmonary trouble, and in November 1882, removed with his family to Colorado Springs, Colorado. He died there, of mountain fever, January 23, 1884, in his 52nd year.

He married, in Stamford, Conn., May 27, 1863, Fanny M., daughter of Seymour Hoyt, who survived him with their four daughters.
