= Utica, Winnebago County, Wisconsin =

Utica, Wisconsin
- Town
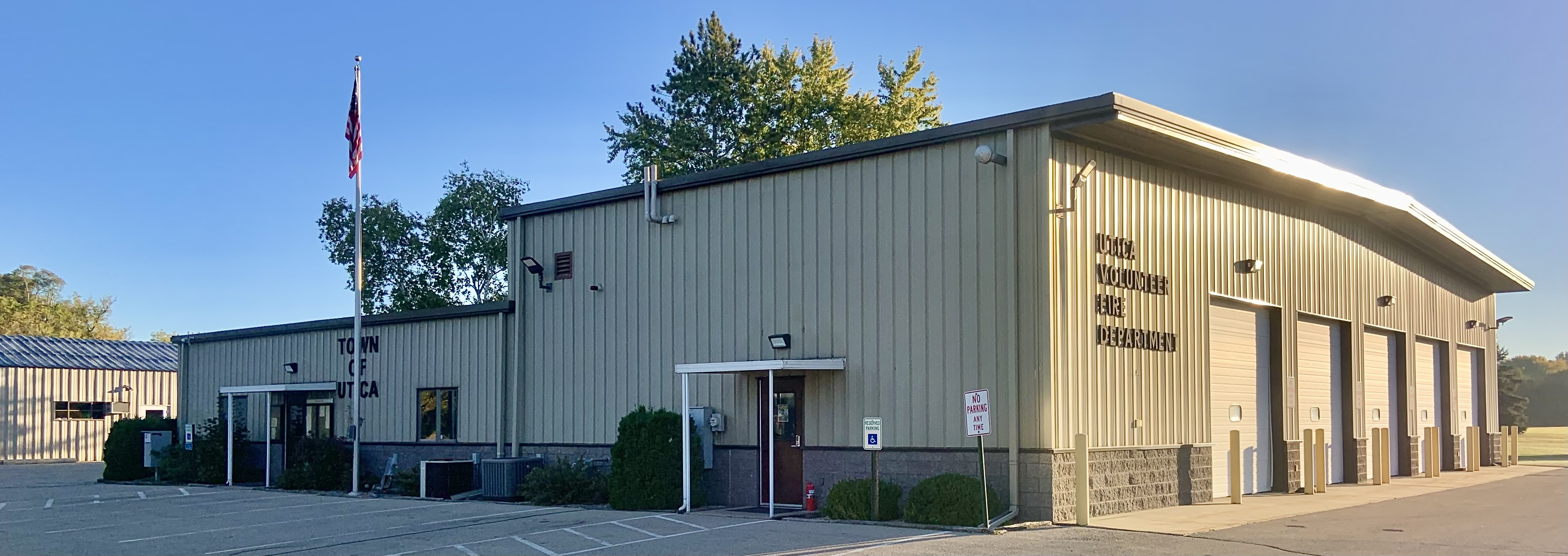
- Town hall

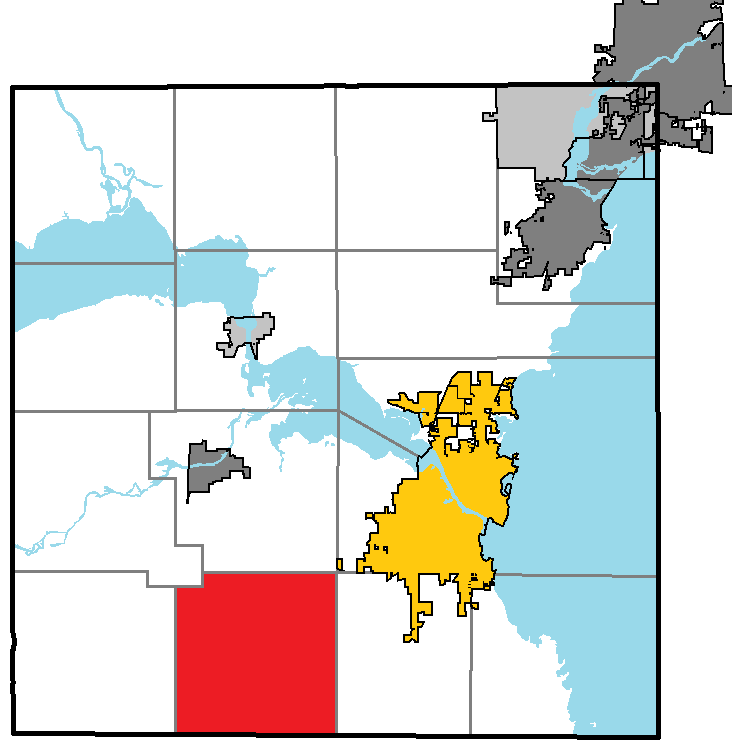
- Location of Utica, within Winnebago County, Wisconsin
- Coordinates: 43°56′44″N 88°42′2″W
- Country: United States
- State: Wisconsin
- County: Winnebago

Area
  - Total: 35.9 sq mi (92.9 km^{2})
  - Land: 35.5 sq mi (92.0 km^{2})
  - Water: 0.31 sq mi (0.8 km^{2})
- Elevation: 869 ft (265 m)

Population (2020)
  - Total: 1,364
  - Density: 38.4/sq mi (14.8/km^{2})
- Time zone: UTC-6 (Central (CST))
  - Summer (DST): UTC-5 (CDT)
- Area code: 920
- FIPS code: 55-82175
- GNIS feature ID: 1584323
- Website: townofuticawi.gov

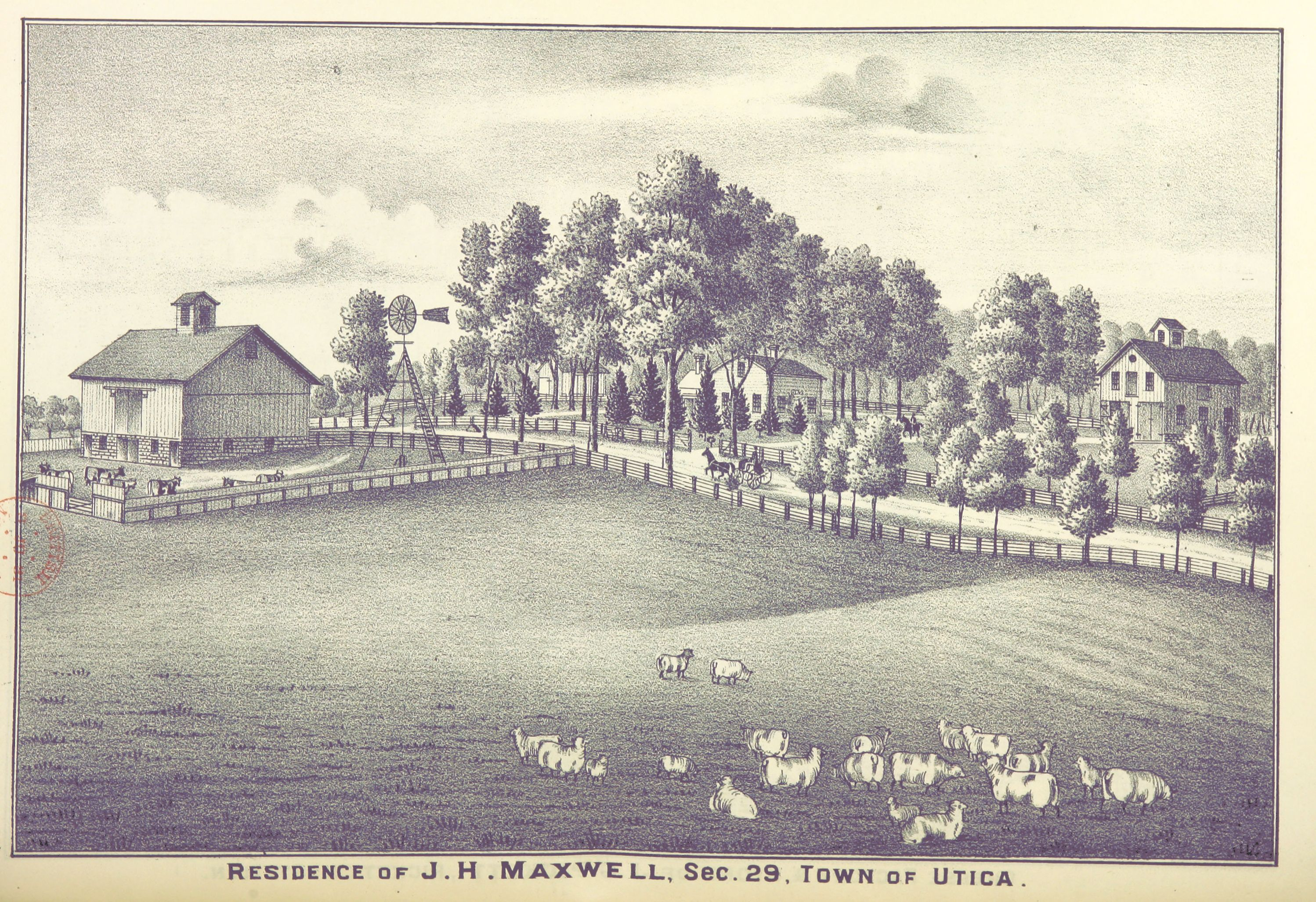
Residence of J.H. Maxwell, 19th century.

Utica (formerly Welaunee) is a town in Winnebago County, Wisconsin, United States. The population was 1,364 at the 2020 census. The unincorporated communities of Elo, Fisk and Pickett are located in the town.

== History ==
The town's first European settlement was in 1846, the area then being part of the Town of Rushford, Wisconsin. Among the first known settlers were people named Leth, Harris, Armine Pickett, D. H. Nash, Lucius Hawley, E. B. Fish, J. M. Little and Hiram McKee. McKee, a Wesleyan Methodist was the first clergyman in town and held the first religious meeting. The first settlement was made on Liberty Prairie, in the central part of this township. (Liberty Prairie took its name from the attachment of many of the early settlers to the principles of the newly organized Liberty Party. On the Fourth of July 1846, the first season of the new settlement was celebrated by these pioneers in a grove, "with the doctrines of '76 declared as their political creed, an oration delivered by Rev. H. McKee, and the prairie christened with the imposing name of 'Liberty.'") Nearly the whole township was claimed within two years, and March 11, 1848 it was organized as a separate town under the name of Utica; the first town meeting was held at the house of Mr. Lucius Hawley, D. H. Nash was elected to the office of chairman of the board supervisors and Ely N. Hyde, town clerk. The town continued under the name of Utica until 1856, at which time it was changed to Welaunee.

As of 1856 there were two post offices in the town, Welaunee or Weelaunee [now Pickett] and Fisks Corners [now Fisk].

== Geography ==
According to the United States Census Bureau, the town has a total area of 35.9 square miles (92.9 km^{2}), of which 35.5 square miles (92.0 km^{2}) is land and 0.31 square miles (0.8 km^{2}), or 0.88%, is water.

== Economy ==
Utica Energy is an ethanol plant in Utica.

== Demographics ==
In 1855 there were six schoolhouses with 276 students, and a total of 824 inhabitants. The population was principally composed of emigrants from the older states, with a large portion of Welsh.

As of the census of 2000, there were 1,168 people, 453 households, and 353 families residing in the town. The population density was 32.6 people per square mile (12.6/km^{2}). There were 469 housing units at an average density of 13.1 per square mile (5.1/km^{2}). The racial makeup of the town was 99.23% White, 0.17% Native American, 0.17% Asian, 0.17% from other races, and 0.26% from two or more races.

There were 453 households, out of which 32.0% had children under the age of 18 living with them, 70.0% were married couples living together, 4.0% had a female householder with no husband present, and 21.9% were non-families. 18.1% of all households were made up of individuals, and 9.5% had someone living alone who was 65 years of age or older. The average household size was 2.58 and the average family size was 2.92.

In the town, the population was spread out, with 25.4% under the age of 18, 4.9% from 18 to 24, 28.9% from 25 to 44, 27.7% from 45 to 64, and 13.0% who were 65 years of age or older. The median age was 41 years. For every 100 females there were 106.7 males. For every 100 females age 18 and over, there were 98.0 males.

The median income for a household in the town was $49,800, and the median income for a family was $54,938. Males had a median income of $34,375 versus $23,409 for females. The per capita income for the town was $21,518. About 1.7% of families and 3.8% of the population were below the poverty line, including 4.8% of those under age 18 and 5.4% of those age 65 or over.

== Notable people ==
- Thomas J. Bowles, Wisconsin State Representative, lived in the town
- Frank Leach, Wisconsin State Representative, lived in the town. Leach served on the Utica Town Board
- Henry I. Weed, Wisconsin State Senator, lived in the town
