= Thomas J. Bowles (American politician) =

American politician

Thomas J. Bowles was an American politician. He was a member of the Wisconsin State Assembly from Utica, Winnebago County, Wisconsin.

== Biography ==
Bowles was born on May 2, 1822, in Milan, Ohio. During the American Civil War, he served with the 8th Wisconsin Volunteer Infantry Regiment of the Union Army. Conflicts he took part in include the Battle of Nashville.

== Political career ==
Bowles was a member of the Assembly during the 1881 and 1882 sessions. Other positions he held include member of the County Board of Winnebago County, Wisconsin. He was a Republican.
