= Nekimi, Wisconsin =

- Town
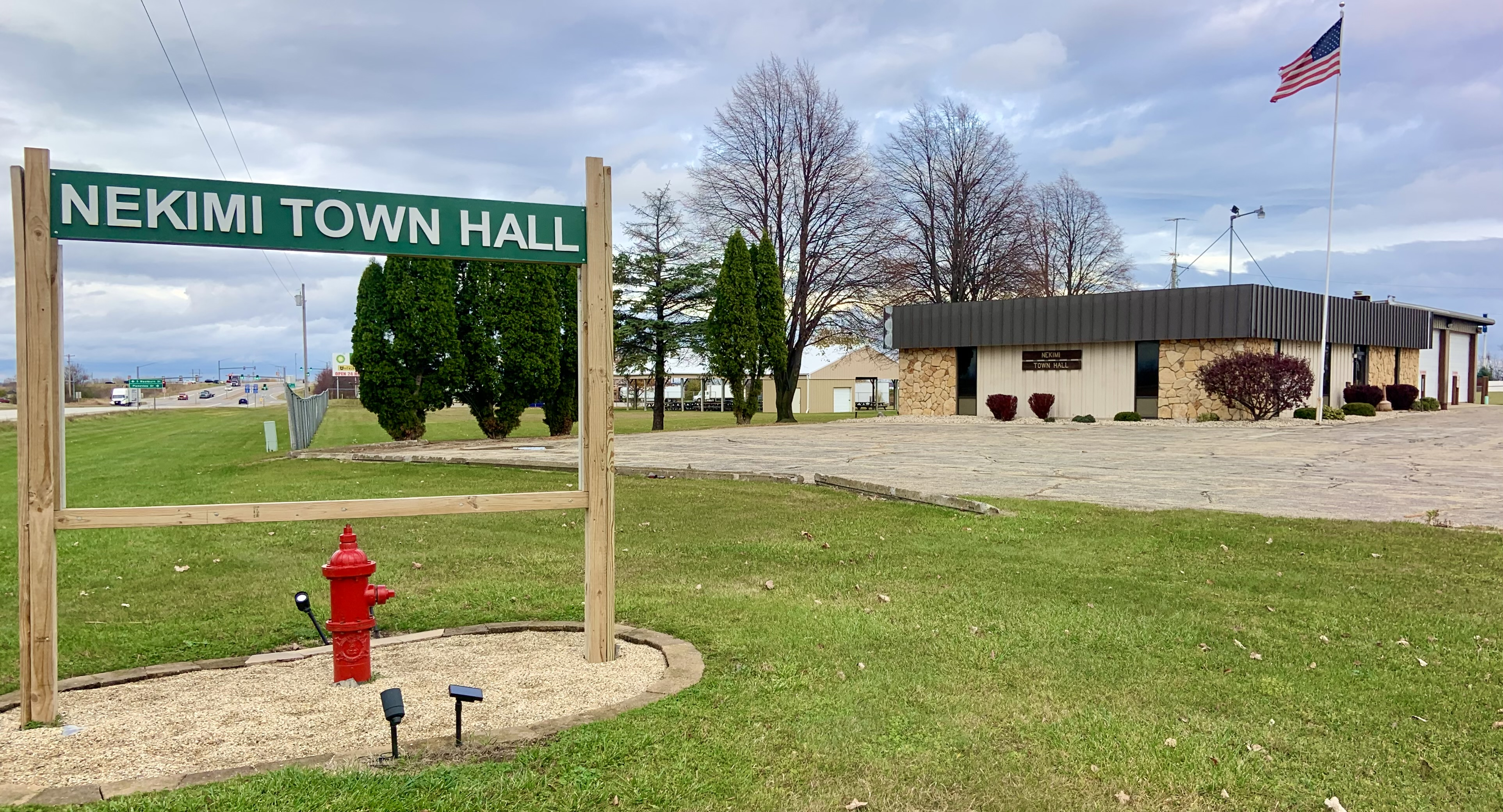
- Town hall

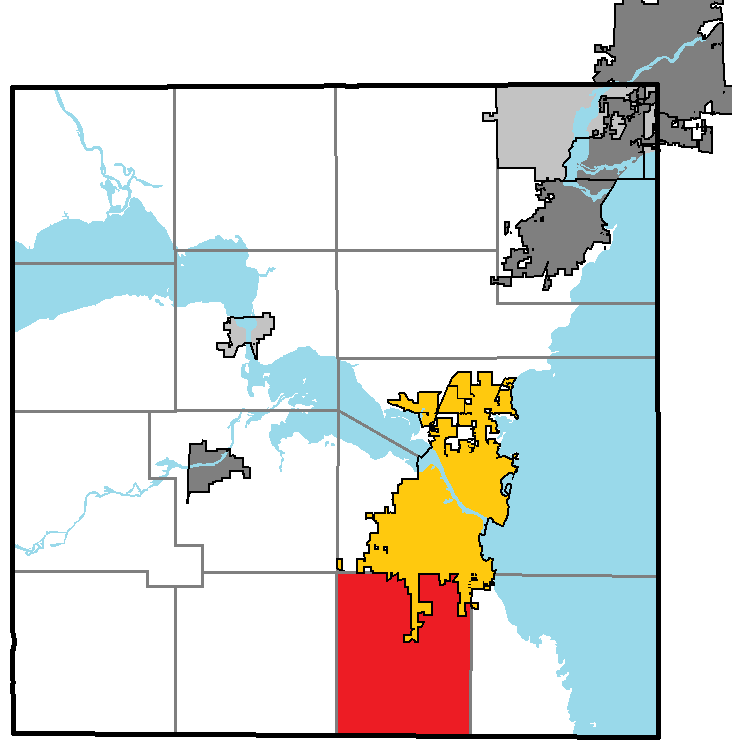
- Location of Nekimi, within Winnebago County
- Coordinates: 43°57′N 88°35′W
- Country: United States
- State: Wisconsin
- County: Winnebago

Area
  - Total: 28.8 sq mi (74.6 km^{2})
  - Land: 28.7 sq mi (74.4 km^{2})
  - Water: 0.12 sq mi (0.3 km^{2})
- Elevation: 889 ft (271 m)

Population (2020)
  - Total: 1,337
  - Density: 46.5/sq mi (18.0/km^{2})
- Time zone: UTC-6 (Central (CST))
  - Summer (DST): UTC-5 (CDT)
- Area code: 920
- FIPS code: 55-55850
- GNIS feature ID: 1583787
- Website: www.townofnekimi.com

Nekimi, sometimes called Nekemi, is a town in Winnebago County, Wisconsin, United States. The population was 1,337 at the 2020 census. The unincorporated communities of Fitzgerald and Ring are located in the town. A part of the grounds for EAA AirVenture Oshkosh are located within the town.

== Geography ==
According to the United States Census Bureau, the town has a total area of 28.8 square miles (74.6 km^{2}), of which 28.7 square miles (74.4 km^{2}) is land and 0.12 square miles (0.3 km^{2}), or 0.34%, is water.

== Demographics ==
As of the census of 2000, there were 1,419 people, 526 households, and 413 families residing in the town. The population density was 49.0 people per square mile (18.9/km^{2}). There were 540 housing units at an average density of 18.7 per square mile (7.2/km^{2}). The racial makeup of the town was 98.38% White, 0.07% African American, 0.28% Native American, 0.07% Pacific Islander, and 1.20% from two or more races. Hispanic or Latino of any race were 0.42% of the population.

There were 526 households, out of which 34.8% had children under the age of 18 living with them, 70.2% were married couples living together, 4.0% had a female householder with no husband present, and 21.3% were non-families. 16.2% of all households were made up of individuals, and 5.5% had someone living alone who was 65 years of age or older. The average household size was 2.68 and the average family size was 3.02.

In the town, the population was spread out, with 24.3% under the age of 18, 7.0% from 18 to 24, 28.8% from 25 to 44, 28.8% from 45 to 64, and 11.1% who were 65 years of age or older. The median age was 40 years. For every 100 females, there were 104.8 males. For every 100 females age 18 and over, there were 106.9 males.

The median income for a household in the town was $50,547, and the median income for a family was $55,714. Males had a median income of $35,116 versus $23,438 for females. The per capita income for the town was $20,355. About 2.8% of families and 3.5% of the population were below the poverty line, including 1.8% of those under age 18 and 11.2% of those age 65 or over.

== Notable people ==
- Milan Ford, former Nekimi town chairman, was a farmer who served two terms as a Greenback Party member of the Wisconsin State Assembly
- Casper Schmidt, was a miller, originally from Germany who emigrated to Wisconsin and settled in Nekimi. He later moved to Oshkosh, which he represented in the Wisconsin State Assembly
- Charles F. Simmons, farmer and Wisconsin State Representative, was born in the town
