= Rushford, Wisconsin =

- Town
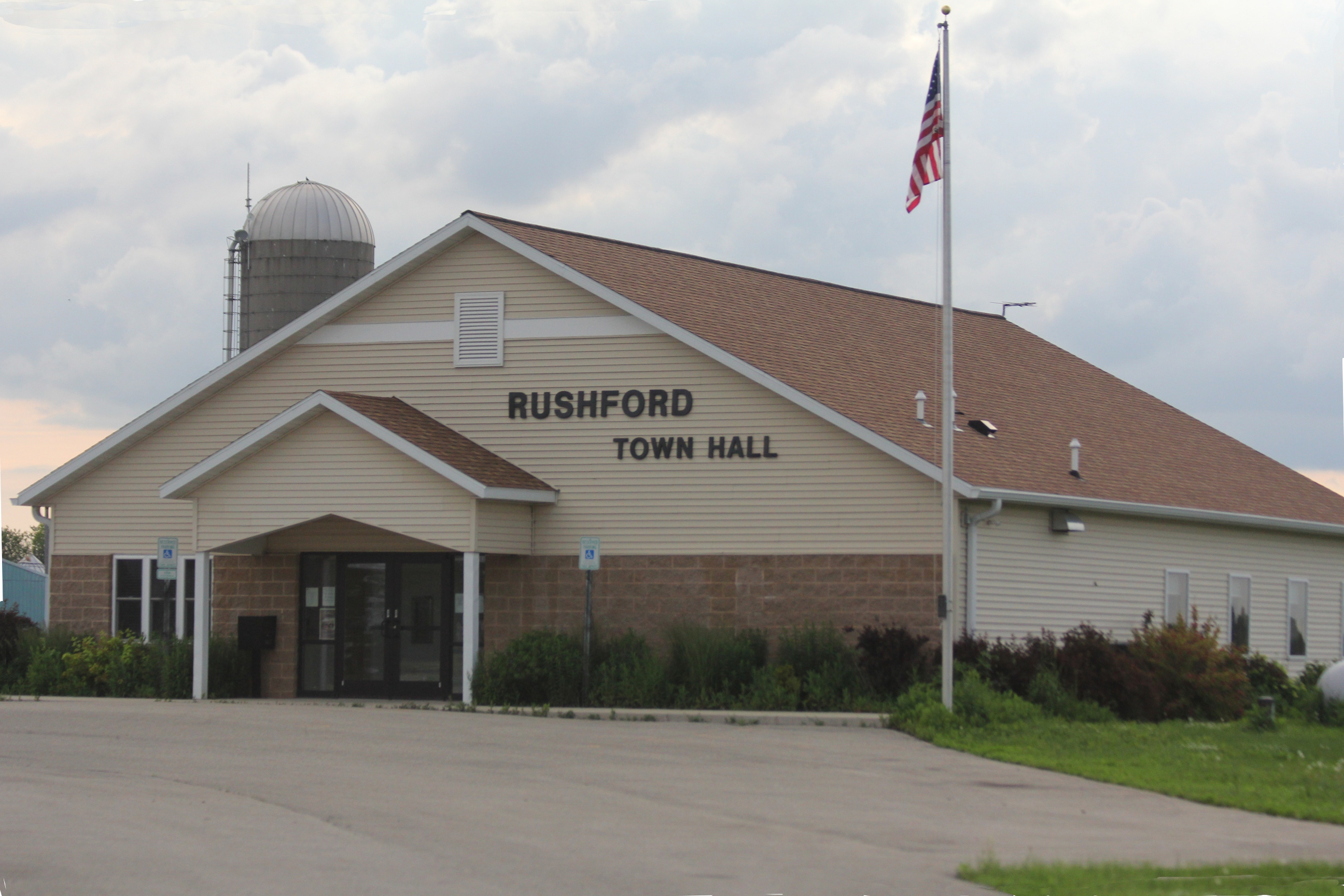
- town hall

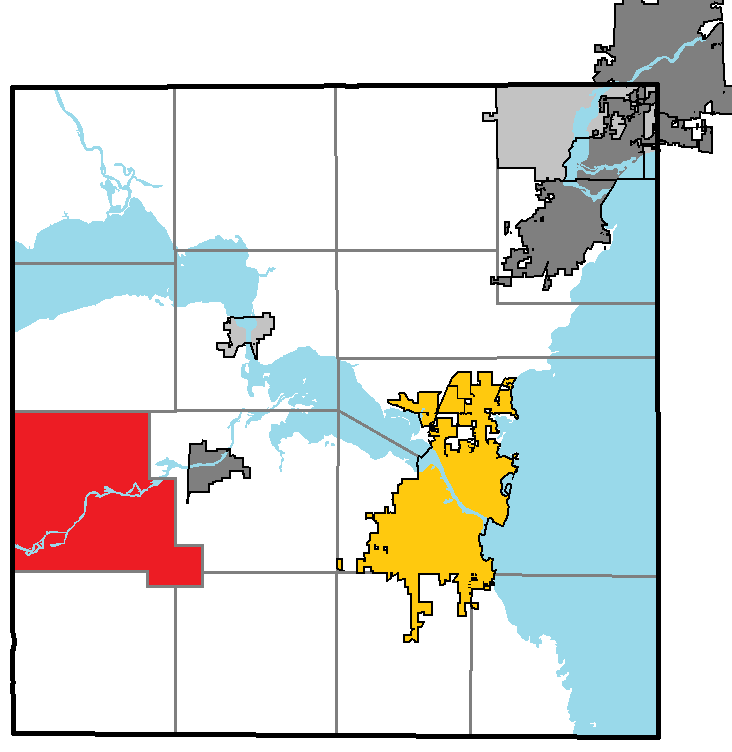
- Location of Rushford, within Winnebago County
- Coordinates: 44°0′47″N 88°49′54″W
- Country: United States
- State: Wisconsin
- County: Winnebago

Area
  - Total: 35.6 sq mi (92.1 km^{2})
  - Land: 34.8 sq mi (90.1 km^{2})
  - Water: 0.77 sq mi (2.0 km^{2})
- Elevation: 751 ft (229 m)

Population (2020)
  - Total: 1,623
  - Density: 46.7/sq mi (18.0/km^{2})
- Time zone: UTC-6 (Central (CST))
  - Summer (DST): UTC-5 (CDT)
- Area code: 920
- FIPS code: 55-70125
- GNIS feature ID: 1584076
- Website: www.townofrushford.org

Rushford is a town in Winnebago County, Wisconsin, United States. The population was 1,623 at the 2020 census. The unincorporated communities of Eureka, Island Park, and Waukau are located in the town. The ghost town of Delhi was located in the town.

== Geography ==
According to the United States Census Bureau, the town has a total area of 35.6 square miles (92.1 km^{2}), of which 34.8 square miles (90.1 km^{2}) is land and 0.77 square miles (2.0 km^{2}), or 2.14%, is water.

== Demographics ==
As of the census of 2000, there were 1,471 people, 549 households, and 409 families residing in the town. The population density was 42.0 people per square mile (16.2/km^{2}). There were 594 housing units at an average density of 16.9 per square mile (6.5/km^{2}). The racial makeup of the town was 98.44% White, 0.07% African American, 0.14% Native American, 0.07% Asian, 0.34% from other races, and 0.95% from two or more races. Hispanic or Latino of any race were 1.36% of the population.

There were 549 households, out of which 32.1% had children under the age of 18 living with them, 65.9% were married couples living together, 4.7% had a female householder with no husband present, and 25.5% were non-families. 20.0% of all households were made up of individuals, and 7.7% had someone living alone who was 65 years of age or older. The average household size was 2.68 and the average family size was 3.13.

In the town, the population was spread out, with 25.4% under the age of 18, 7.1% from 18 to 24, 29.8% from 25 to 44, 26.0% from 45 to 64, and 11.8% who were 65 years of age or older. The median age was 38 years. For every 100 females, there were 106.9 males. For every 100 females age 18 and over, there were 104.9 males.

The median income for a household in the town was $45,990, and the median income for a family was $52,614. Males had a median income of $34,038 versus $22,222 for females. The per capita income for the town was $20,768. About 1.5% of families and 2.3% of the population were below the poverty line, including 1.2% of those under age 18 and 3.1% of those age 65 or over.
