= Wisconsin's 52nd Assembly district =

American legislative district for Appleton, Wisconsin

Wisconsin's 52nd State Assembly district
- 2024 map defined in 2023 Wisc. Act 94; 2022 map defined in Johnson v. Wisconsin Elections Commission; 2011 map was defined in 2011 Wisc. Act 43
Assemblymember
Lee Snodgrass; D–Appleton
since January 6, 2025 (1 years)
- Demographics: 82.5% White; 3.29% Black; 5.64% Hispanic; 6.01% Asian; 2.24% Native American; 0.2% Hawaiian/Pacific Islander
- Population (2020) • Voting age: 60,100; 46,741
- Website: Official website
- Notes: Appleton, Wisconsin

The 52nd Assembly district of Wisconsin is one of 99 districts in the Wisconsin State Assembly. Located in eastern Wisconsin, the district comprises part of southern Outagamie County, including most of the city of Appleton and the villages of Eden and Oakfield. The district also contains the Fox Cities Performing Arts Center, the Fox Cities Stadium, the Appleton campus of the Fox Valley Technical College, Lawrence University, the Fox River Paper Company Historic District, the Appleton Locks 1–3 Historic District and the Appleton Lock 4 Historic District. The district is represented by Democrat Lee Snodgrass, since January 2025; Snodgrass previously represented the 57th district from 2021 to 2025.

The 52nd Assembly district is located within Wisconsin's 18th Senate district, along with the 53rd and 54th Assembly districts.

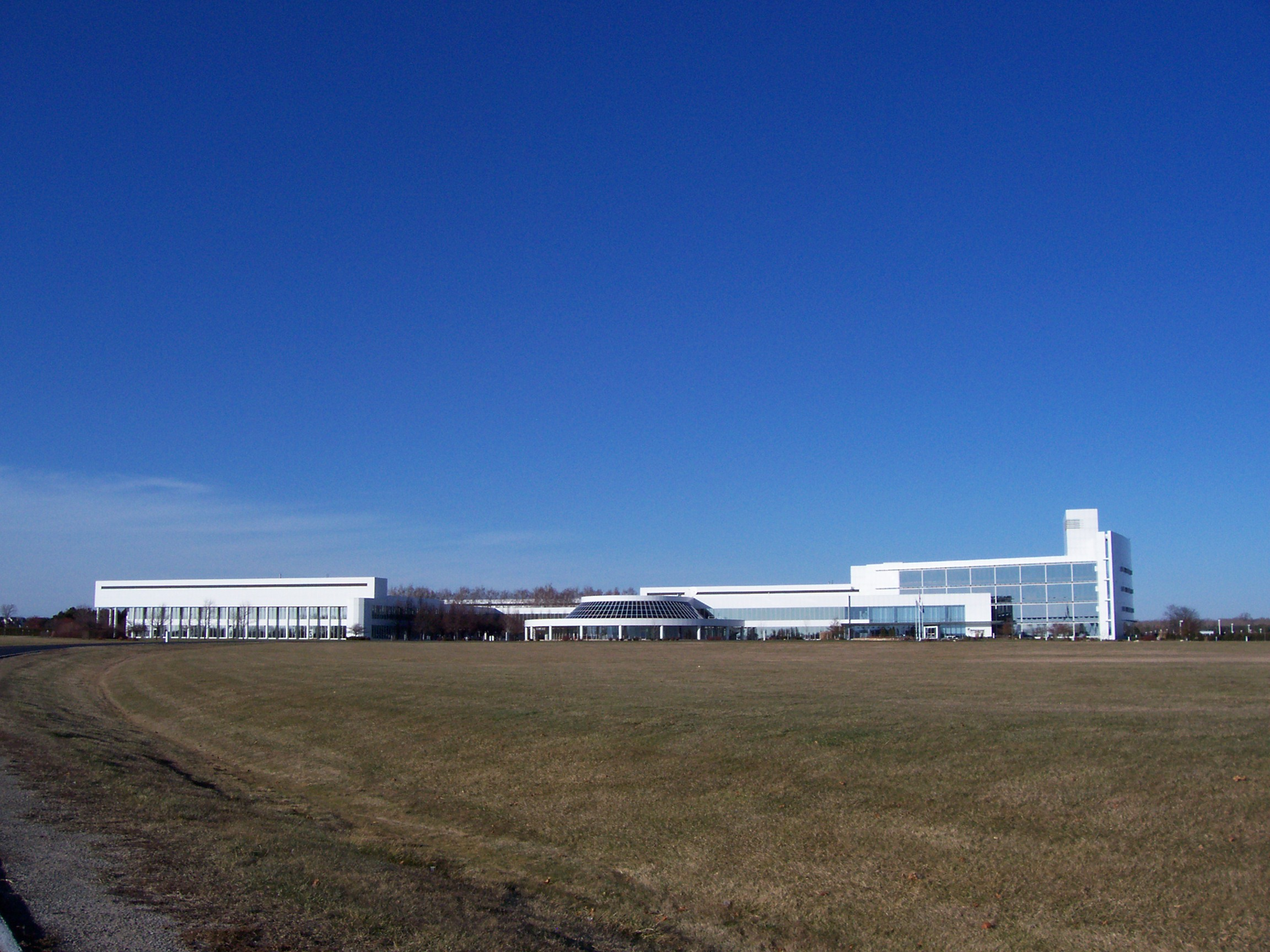
Thrivent Financial Appleton headquarters

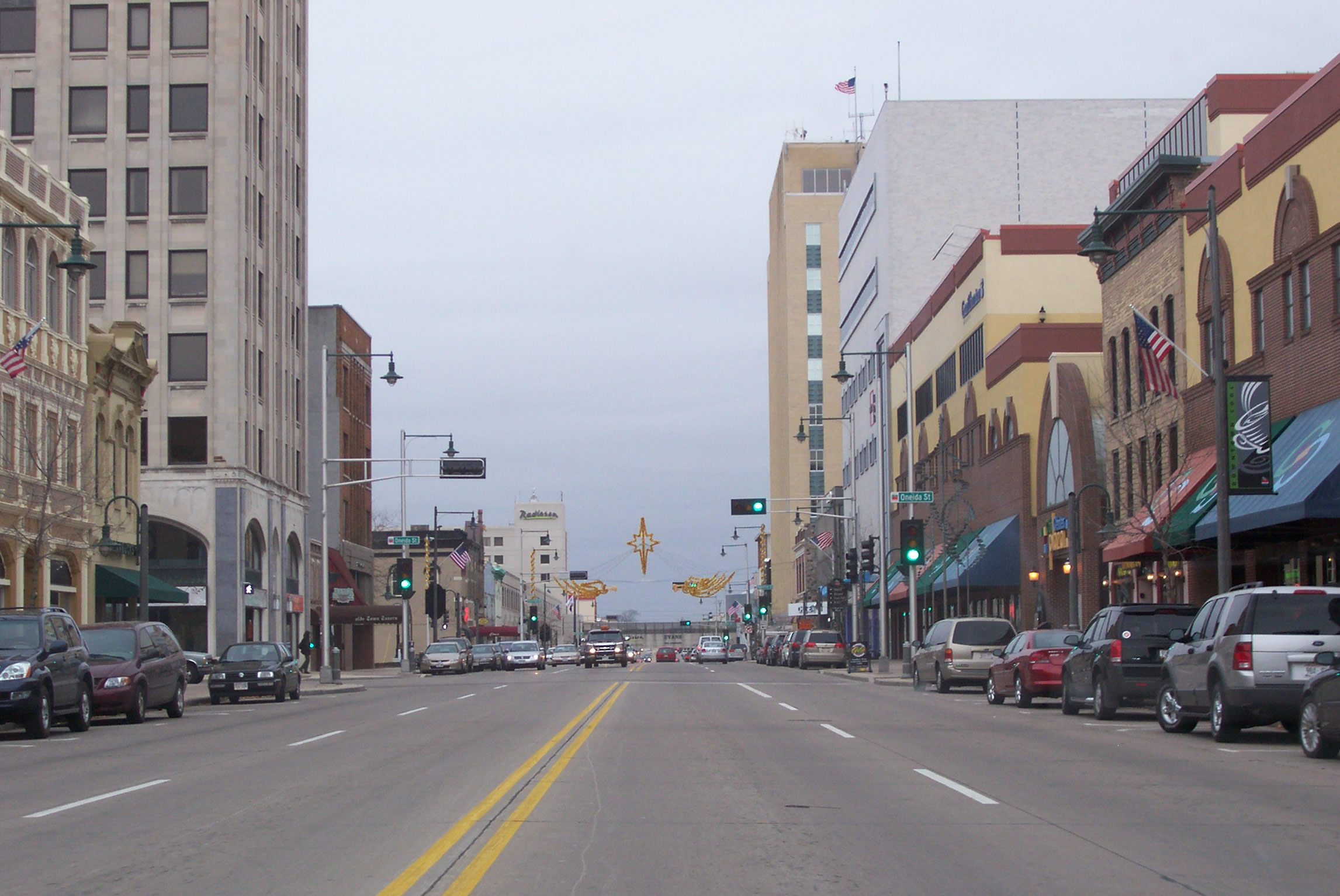
College Avenue Historic District in downtown Appleton

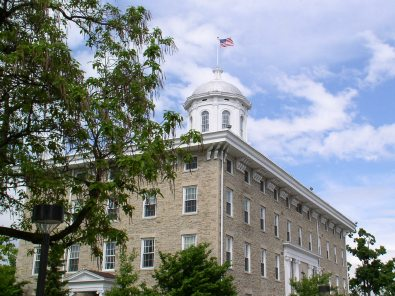
Main Hall of Lawrence University

== List of past representatives ==
List of representatives to the Wisconsin State Assembly from the 52nd district
Member	Party	Residence	Counties represented	Term start	Term end	Ref.
District created
Earl F. McEssy	Rep.	Fond du Lac	Fond du Lac	January 1, 1973	January 3, 1983	
Richard P. Matty	Rep.	Stephenson	Marinette, Oconto	January 3, 1983	January 7, 1985	
Earl F. McEssy	Rep.	Fond du Lac	Fond du Lac, Winnebago	January 7, 1985	January 7, 1991	
Peg Lautenschlager	Dem.	Fond du Lac	Fond du Lac, Winnebago	January 1, 1989	January 4, 1993	
John P. Dobyns	Rep.	Fond du Lac	Fond du Lac	January 4, 1993	January 4, 1999	
John F. Townsend	Rep.	Fond du Lac	Fond du Lac	January 4, 1999	January 3, 2011	
Jeremy Thiesfeldt	Rep.	Fond du Lac	Fond du Lac	January 3, 2011	January 2, 2023	
Jerry L. O'Connor	Rep.	Fond du Lac	Fond du Lac	January 3, 2023	January 6, 2025	
Lee Snodgrass	Dem.	Appleton	Outagamie	January 6, 2025	Current	
