= Widen (disambiguation) =

Widen is a municipality in Switzerland.

Widen or Widén may also refer to:

- Widen, West Virginia, community in United States
- Widen (company), American software company
- WiDEN, Wideband Integrated Digital Enhanced Network, software

== People with the surname ==
- Bernard A. Widen (1920–2017), American dentist and artist
- Gregory Widen (active 1986-), American screenwriter and director
- Peter Widén (born 1967), Swedish pole-vaulter
- Pontus Widén (1920–1983), Swedish bandy player
- Raphael Widen (died 1833), American pioneer and politician
- Sara Widén (1981–2014), Swedish opera singer
