= List of the tallest buildings in the Fox Valley Metro =

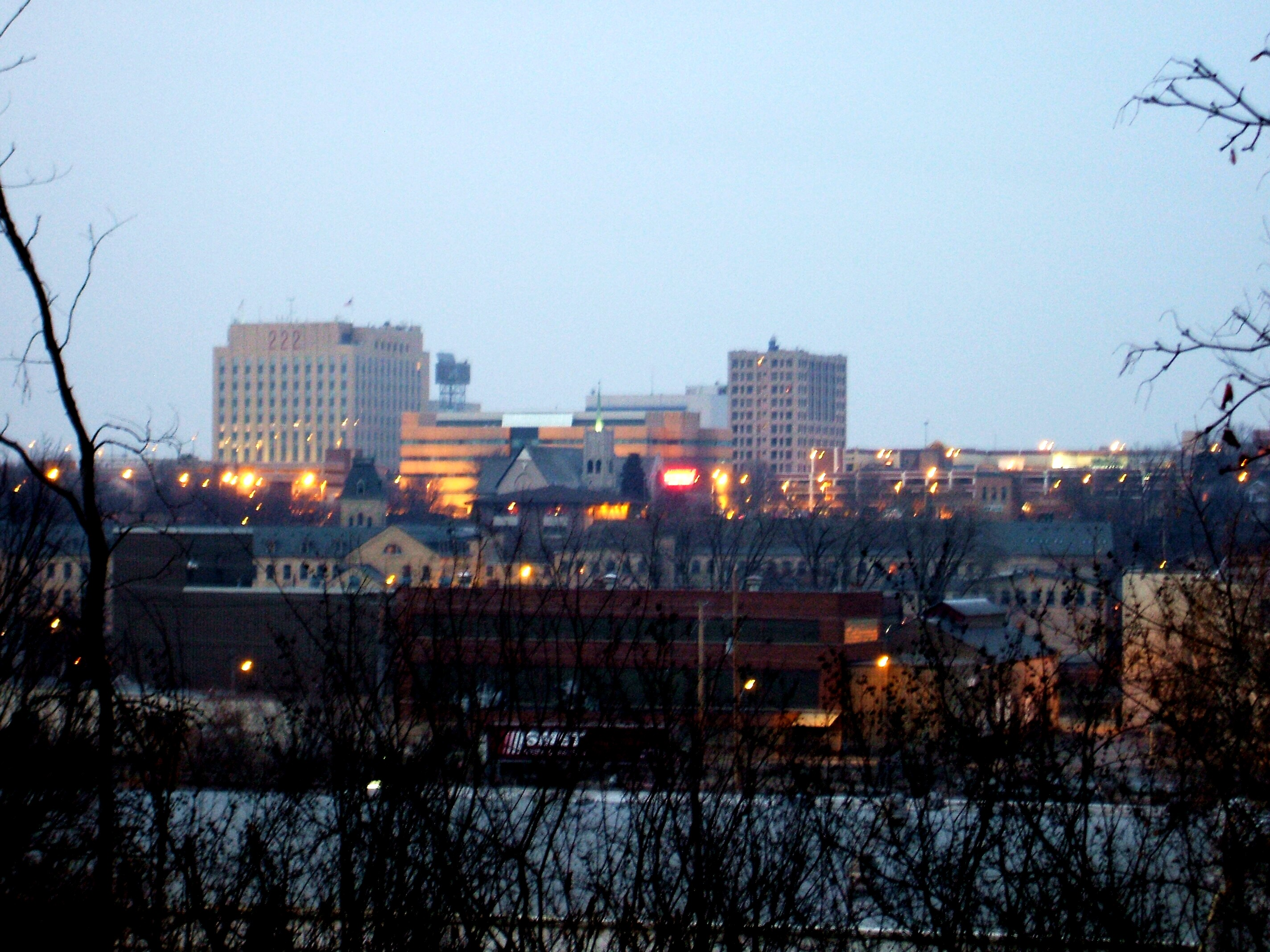
Downtown Appleton

The Fox Valley is a large metropolitan area in northern Wisconsin on Lake Winnebago. The head city in this metro area is Appleton. The population of the metro area is about 467,586. The largest cities in the Fox Valley metro are Appleton, Oshkosh, and Fond Du Lac. However, three separate metropolitan areas make up the larger Fox Valley Metro area. These metro areas are: Appleton metro, Oshkosh metro, and the Fond Du Lac metro.

The following list has the tallest buildings in the Fox Valley. Every city mentioned before has at least one building on this list, Neenah also has one building in this list. The buildings on this list are all over 100 feet tall. Appleton has the most buildings on this list. The list includes the rank of the building, name of the building, city the building is in, height of the building in feet and in meters, how many floors the building has, and notes about the building.

== List ==
| Rank | Name | City | Height (F/M) | Floors | Notes |
|---|---|---|---|---|---|
| 1 | 222 Building (Appleton) | Appleton | 183/56 | 11 | Tallest building outside of Madison, Wausau and Milwaukee. The original height of the building was supposed to be 222 feet but the city had the height of the building change. Tallest building in Wisconsin in city in more than 2 counties. |
| 2 | Court Tower | Oshkosh | 171/52 | 15 | Tallest building in Oshkosh and tallest building south of Appleton and north of both Madison and Milwaukee. |
| 3 | Zuelke Building | Appleton | 168/51 | 12 | 2nd tallest building in Appleton. The first skyscraper built in Appleton. |
| 4 | Clock Tower Place | Neenah | 159/48 | 13 | Tallest building in Neenah, tallest building between Oshkosh and Appleton. |
| 5 | Penthouse at Park | Appleton | 136/41 | 11 | Tallest building in Appleton outside of downtown Appleton. |
| 6 | St.Vincents Church (Clock Tower) | Oshkosh | 135/41 | 10 | 2nd tallest building in Oshkosh. |
| 7 | Oneida Heights | Appleton | 124/38 | 10 | The tallest public housing building in Appleton |
| 8 | Rosalind Apartments | Fond Du Lac | 123/37 | 10 | First building to appear on this list for Fond Du Lac. Tallest building in Fond Du Lac. |
| 9 | Gruenhagen Conference Center East Building | Oshkosh | 122/37 | 10 | One of 2 conference centers in Oshkosh. |
| 10 | Gruenhagen Conference Center West Building | Oshkosh | 122/37 | 10 | The second of 2 conference centers in Oshkosh |

== See also ==
- Appleton
- Oshkosh
- Fond du Lac
- Neenah
