= 222 Building =

Tallest building in Appleton, Wisconsin

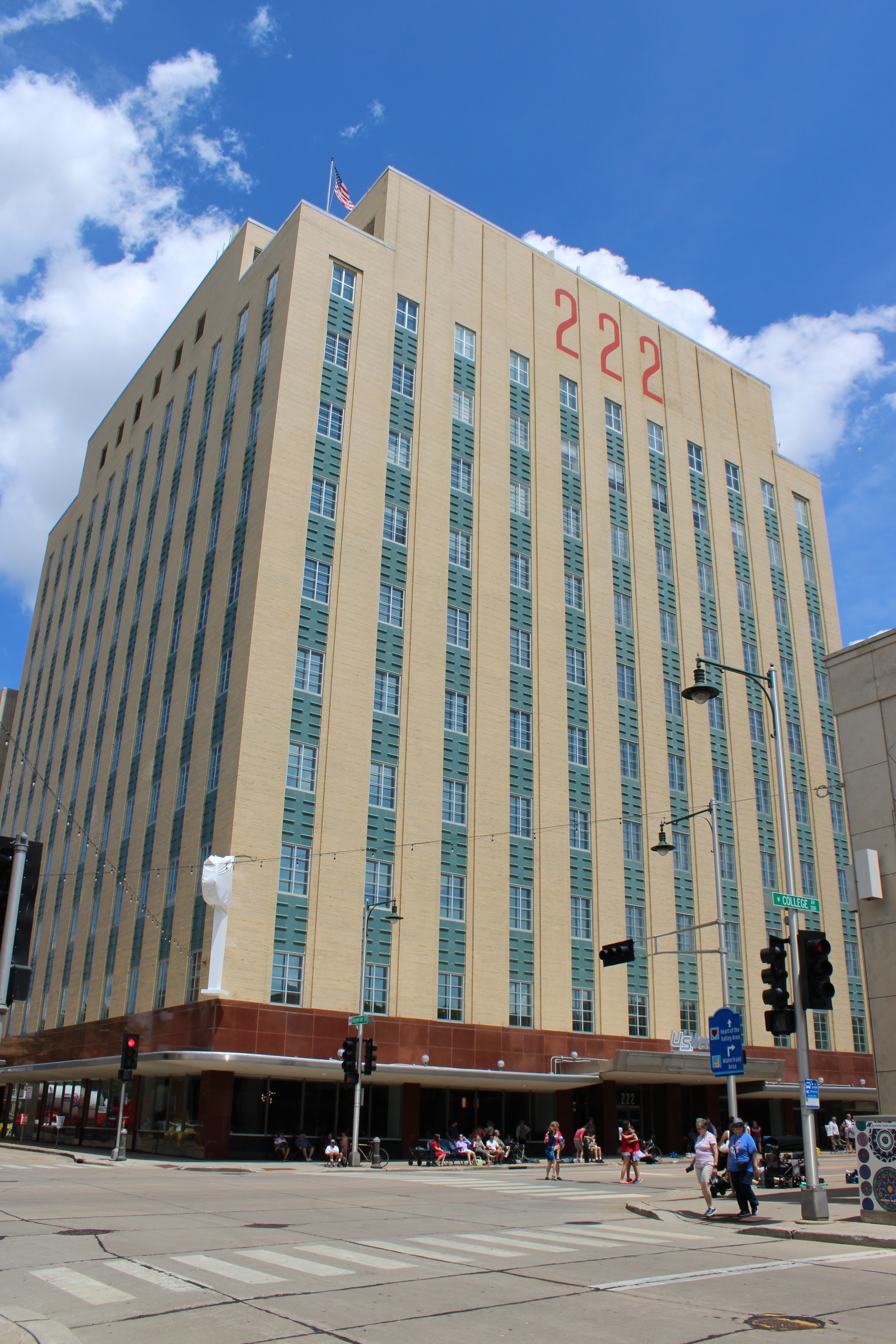
- The 222 Building
- Interactive map of the 222 Building area
- Alternative names: Thrivent Financial for Lutherans Building; AAL Building; Aid Association for Lutherans Building

Record height
- Tallest in Outagamie County, Wisconsin since 1952^{[I]}
- Preceded by: Zuelke Building

General information
- Architectural style: Art-Deco
- Location: 222 West College Avenue, Appleton, United States
- Coordinates: 44.262°N 88.4084°W
- Completed: 1952
- Renovated: 1964–1966
- Affiliation: Thrivent

Height
- Height: 183 ft (56 m)

Technical details
- Material: Brick
- Floor count: 10
- Floor area: 235,000 square feet (21,800 m^{2})

Design and construction
- Architect: Maurey Lee Allen
- Architecture firm: Cram and Ferguson; Kohn Pedersen Fox Associates PC
- Main contractor: Boldt Construction

Other information
- Public transit: Valley Transit

The 222 Building is a 10-story building located in downtown Appleton, Wisconsin. It was built in 1952 for the Aid Association for Lutherans and has been the tallest building in Appleton ever since. It is built in a characteristic Art Deco style.

== Background ==
=== Aid Association for Lutherans ===
The AAL was founded in 1902 by a group of Luthran church members from Appleton Wisconsin. The group initially operated out of a single home office, but as they expanded, they moved to occupy the Commercial National Bank Building, and then the First National Bank Building.

=== Insurance Building ===
By the 1920s, The AAL had grown enough that it required the construction of its own office building. Design firm Parkinson and Dockendorff were contracted for the design, and construction on the 5-story building, located on the northeast corner of Superior St and College Avenue, began on May 26, 1921. The construction was undertaken by the Wisconsin Engineering and Construction Company at a cost of $370,000. Upon its completion and occupation on March 3, 1923, the building was hailed for its modern amenities, including a cutting-edge elevator system, automatic vacuum cleaning tubes, and a bowling club in the basement. The Association occupied only the 5th floor at the time of the building's construction, but it would slowly expand into the other floors as it needed more office space. The company would occupy this building until the completion of the AAL building, at which time it would be leased out until its demolition in 1964.

== History ==
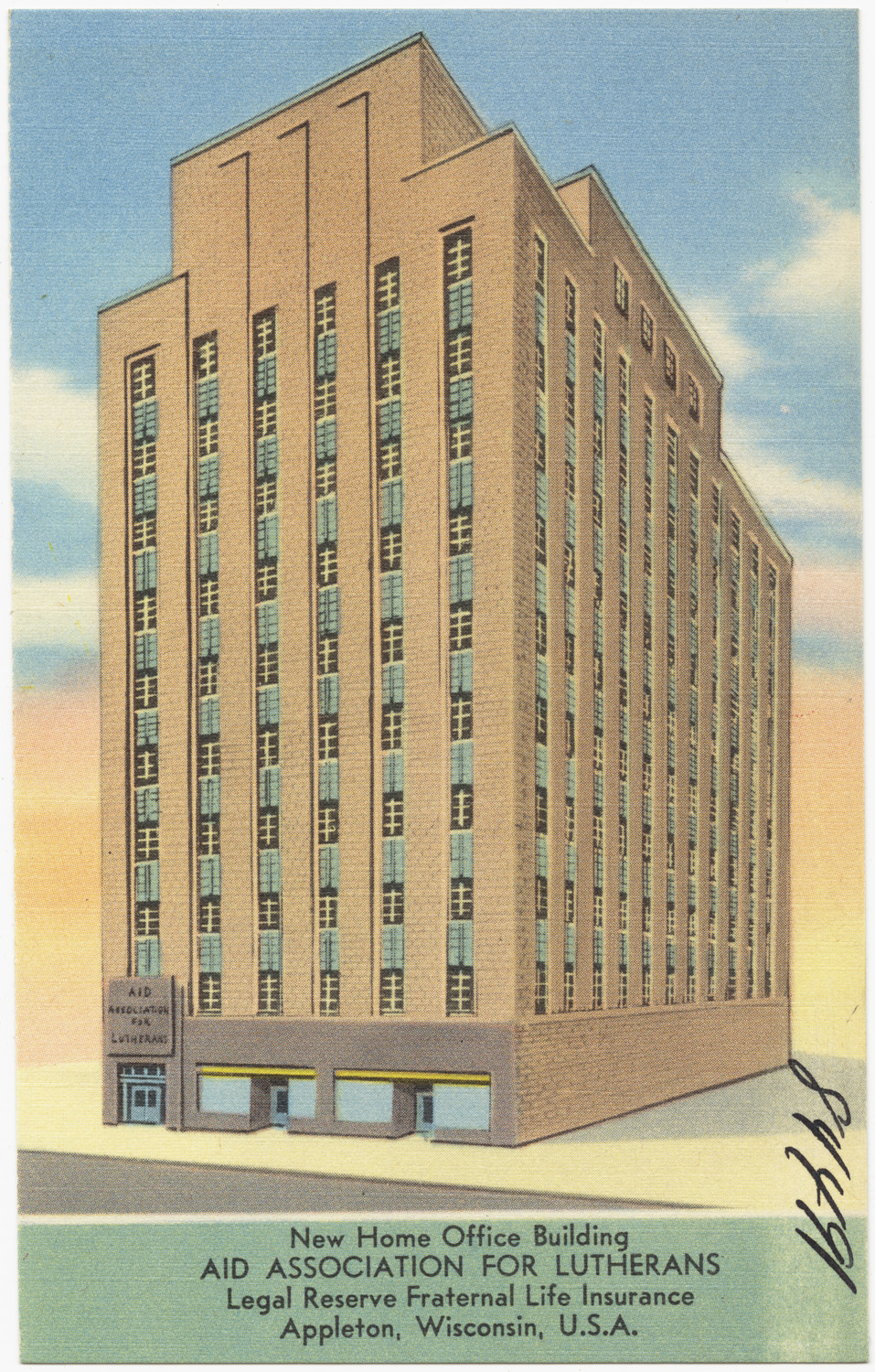
Original building (pre-expansion)

By 1950, AAL once again required more office space. Construction on the new 10-story building began in 1950, after the Elite Theatre, located on the site adjacent to the Insurance Building, was demolished. It was completed in 1952, in conjunction with AAL's 50th anniversary. In anticipation for future expansion, the building was constructed in a way that would allow a future renovation that would expand the building westwards after the demolition of the Insurance Building.

This expansion was completed in 1966 to again accommodate the association's growing needs, and AAL remained in the building until 1977, when they relocated to a different campus in Appleton.

After the move, AAL continued to lease the space to several tenants, including Johnson Financial Group, ThedaCare, AIA Corp, and The Post-Crescent.

In 2002, AAL merged with the Lutheran Brotherhood of Minneapolis to become Thrivent Financial for Lutherans. After the merger, the building was sold to a group of investors, and its name was changed to the 222 building, based on its address.

In 2023, U.S. Venture announced their purchase of the building, and their plans to renovate it for use as their national headquarters. After renovations are completed and current lease agreements expire, they will occupy all 10 floors.

In 2024, the building was added to the National Register of Historic Places.
