= Wisconsin Physicians Service =

Wisconsin Physicians Service Insurance Corporation
- Type: Private
- Industry: Insurance
- Founded: 1946
- Headquarters: Monona, Wisconsin, US
- Key people: Ray Koenig, First President; Wendy Perkins, (President, CEO)
- Number of employees: 2,700+
- Website: www.wpshealth.com

Wisconsin Physicians Service Insurance Corporation (WPS Health Solutions) is a not-for-profit service insurance corporation based in Monona, Wisconsin. WPS offers health insurance plans for groups and individuals and benefit plan administration for businesses. WPS also provides insurance claims processing services under various U.S. government contracts and has a subsidiary corporation, EPIC Specialty Benefits, offering dental and other nonmedical benefits.

== History ==
In 1946, the State Medical Society of Wisconsin formed the WPS division in Milwaukee to market and administer the Wisconsin Plan, a non-profit insurance plan intended to help those having difficulty paying for health care.

Charles Crownhart became WPS’ first chief executive officer in 1946, and WPS was awarded the American Medical Association (AMA) Seal of Acceptance in 1948.

WPS relocated from Milwaukee to Madison in 1950. WPS expanded across the state over the next decade, opening sales offices in Kenosha, Green Bay, Eau Claire, Milwaukee, and Wausau. Later, offices were opened in Appleton and La Crosse. WPS moved its Madison headquarters to 1717 W. Broadway in November 1973. In 1998, WPS consolidated its three major lines of business—Medicare, TRICARE, and WPS Health Insurance—on its Monona campus.

In 1975, the Wisconsin legislature passed a law requiring that service insurance corporations be legally separate from the parent professional society.

In order to comply with the legislation, on April 27, 1977, WPS ended its relationship with the Wisconsin Medical Society, becoming an independent not-for-profit corporation.

Ray Koenig was named the first president of WPS.

On June 11, 2012, Mike Hamerlik succeeded Jim Riordan as WPS president and chief executive officer. Hamerlik was formerly the CEO of Noridian Administrative Services, LLC.

In 2016, the International Ethisphere Institute named WPS one of the World's Most Ethical Companies for the seventh straight year.

On August 1, 2022, Mike Hamerlik announced his intent to retire from WPS within the year, implementing a succession and transition plan. A new leadership transition committee was appointed by the board of directors to select Hamerlik's successor within the year leading up to his retirement.

On March 15, 2023, WPS announced its transition committee had appointed chief management officer Wendy Perkins to succeed Mike Hamerlik as president and CEO of the company. Perkins officially succeeded Hamerlik on April 1, 2023.

=== WPS Military and Veterans Health ===
The WPS Military and Veterans Health (MVH) business unit serves members of the U.S. military and their families through TRICARE and Veterans Administration programs.

Since 1956, WPS has continually served the Military Health System as a claims administrator. WPS managed the first regional plan for Civilian Health and Medical Program of the Uniformed Services (CHAMPUS).

WPS MVH provides claims administration, customer service, and related activities for the TRICARE Overseas Program and TRICARE For Life Program. WPS MVH also does contract work for the Veterans Choice program, which is operated by the Department of Veterans Affairs.

On July 21, 2016, the U.S. Department of Defense awarded Humana Government Business the TRICARE 2017 contract for the East Region, with WPS MVH as a subcontractor. WPS will provide information technology support, claims processing, and customer service functions. The East Region includes 30 states and approximately 6 million TRICARE beneficiaries.

=== WPS Government Health Administrators ===
The WPS Government Health Administrators (GHA) business unit administers Medicare Part A and Part B benefits for millions of seniors in multiple states.

During the 1960s, WPS developed its Century Plan for customers age 65 and older and a Medicare PLUS supplement plan, now known as WPS Medicare Companion. It is the most popular Wisconsin-based Medicare supplement plan in the state, with more than 42,000 members, based on enrollment data submitted to the National Association of Insurance Commissioners, 2015.

In 1966, the year Medicare was established, WPS was named the Medicare administrator for the state of Wisconsin. WPS is currently the Medicare Administrative Contractor for Jurisdiction 5 in Iowa, Kansas, Missouri, and Nebraska, as well as for Jurisdiction 8 in Indiana and Michigan.

=== Mutual of Omaha Medicare acquisition ===
In 2005, WPS and Mutual of Omaha announced the acquisition of Mutual of Omaha's Medicare Part A division. Under this agreement, Mutual of Omaha's Medicare Part A division was transferred to WPS. This facilitated WPS competing for the new Medicare Administrative Contract (MAC) regions, which require combined Part A and Part B administration. Previously, CMS awarded separate Part A and Part B contracts by state.

=== EPIC Specialty Benefits ===
In 1984, WPS created The EPIC Life Insurance Company to sell and administer life and disability insurance. Renamed EPIC Specialty Benefits in 2015, the subsidiary offers term life insurance, disability, dental, vision, and voluntary benefits throughout the Midwest.

=== Arise Health Plan ===
In 2005, WPS purchased the assets of Prevea Health Plan and formed a new wholly owned subsidiary. In 2006, the plan was renamed Arise Health Plan.

=== Aspirus Arise Health Plan of Wisconsin, Inc. ===
On January 26, 2016, WPS announced it was entering a partnership with Aspirus, forming Aspirus Arise Health Plan of Wisconsin, Inc., a health insurance company. In 2017, Aspirus Arise will begin selling health plans in 16 counties in north-central Wisconsin.

== Subsidiaries ==
WPS has owned a number of Subsidiaries including:

=== WPS Bank ===
WPS bank was formed in 2009 and had assets of $96.2 million as of December 31, 2014. The bank was purchased by Starion Bank of Bismarck, North Dakota, completing on April 10, 2015.

=== WPS-ETS (External Technology Solutions) ===
ETS was a WPS venture that sold WPS surplus capacity such as Disaster Recovery Hosting and networking solutions leveraging existing facilities, additional staff capacity and vendor relationships to provide services.

=== adtec Services (Administrative and Technical Services, Inc.) ===
adtec Services was an umbrella organization which encompassed a number of subsidiaries. adtec Services was based out of offices at 2801 International Lane, Madison, Wisconsin, and closed in 2012.

==== adtec-IT (Information Technology), formerly adtec Computer Consulting ====
adtec-IT was focused primarily on technical staff placement on a contract, temp to hire or direct hire model. adtec-IT had a dedicated office on South Executive Drive, Brookfield and a satellite office at the corporate headquarters at 2801 International Lane, Madison, Wisconsin. The Brookfield location was consolidated into the same offices as adtec Staffing at 10201 Lincoln Avenue in Milwaukee in 2001 and later adtec IT ceased operations in Milwaukee, moving all people and equipment to the corporate headquarters in Madison, WI. Ultimately adtec IT would close in 2012 when the parent company closed although a group of former Employees formed a new business (Three Pillars Technology)

==== adtec Staffing Services ====
adtec Staffing was a temporary staffing and permanent placement agency.

- Madison

Based at 555 W Washington Ave, the location was adjacent to the bus station (now a CVS) with entrances on Bedford Street. This was the last location to close, remaining open until the shuttering of the parent company in 2012. The operation was formerly based out of 3330 University Avenue, Madison and had a satellite operation which was intermittently used at the corporate office at 2801 International Lane.

- Milwaukee

10201 Lincoln Ave

- Oshkosh

The Oshkosh offices were based at 303 Pearl St, Oshkosh. Oshkosh oversaw most of the Fox Valley operations, recruiting in Fond du Lac on occasion and having a satellite office in Appleton within the WPS offices at 1500 N Casaloma Dr. After the closure of the Green Bay location, Oshkosh also took responsibility for the Green Bay area. When WPS left the Casaloma location, the Appleton office was closed.

- Green Bay

Based at 1331 North Road, Green Bay, this facility was located close to Austin Straubel International Airport. It was the first of the offices to close.

==== New Focus Technology ====
New Focus Technology based out of offices in the same building as the parent company at 2801 International Lane, developed a suite of applications used to crawl databases in order to identify potential fraud. This subsidiary closed around year 2000.

==== adtec Lithographics ====
adtec Lithographics had an office in Beloit, Wisconsin. This subsidiary closed prior to year 2000.
