= Sapolsky =

Sapolsky or Sapolski is a Polish masculine surname, its feminine counterpart is Sapolska or Sapolskaya. Notable people with the surname include:

- Gabe Sapolsky (born 1972), American professional wrestling promoter
- Robert Sapolsky (born 1957), American neuroendocrinologist and author
