= Monona, Wisconsin =

- City
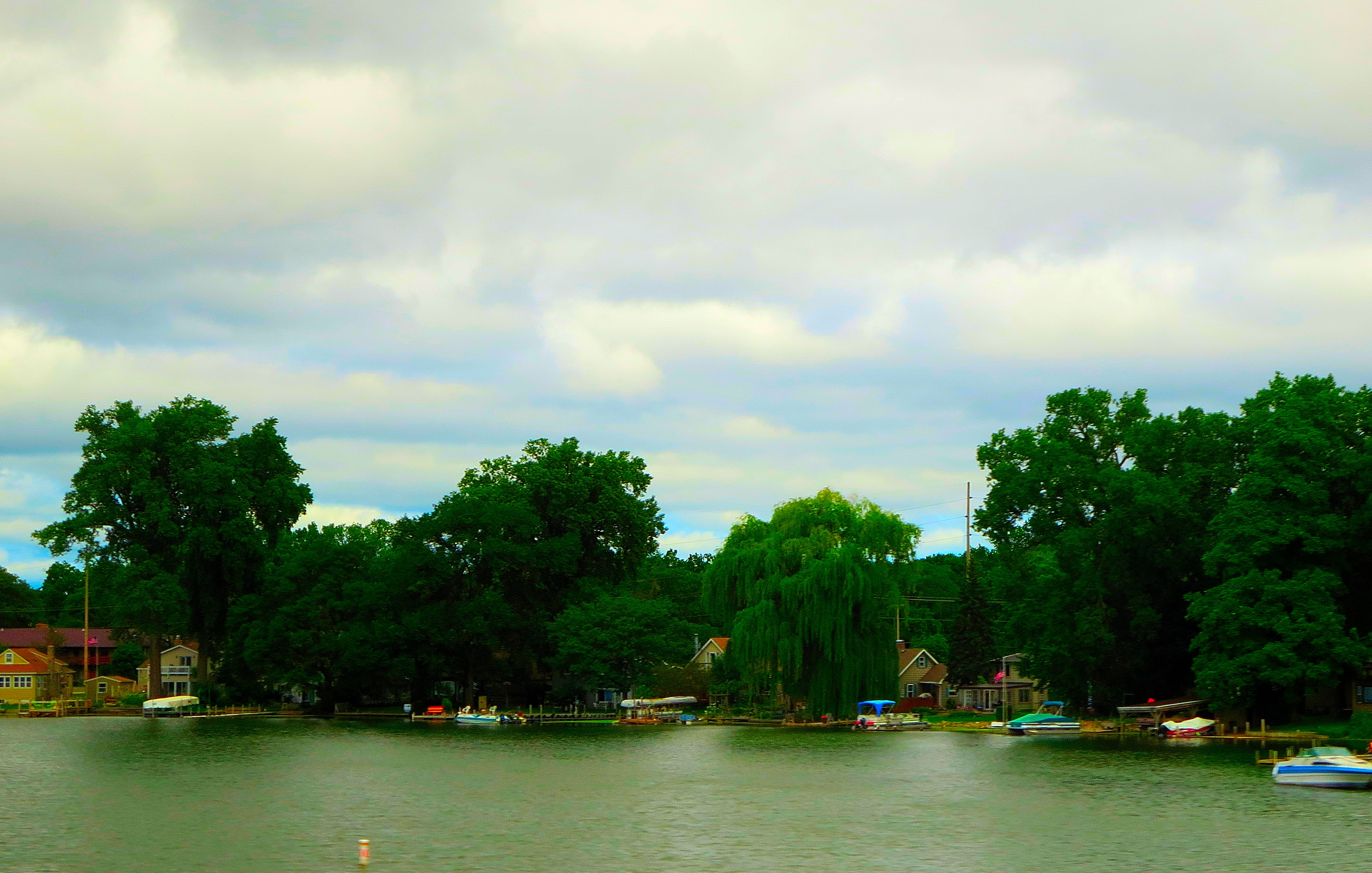
- The Yahara River in Monona
- Interactive map of Monona, Wisconsin
- Location within Wisconsin Location within the United States
- Coordinates: 43°3′25″N 89°20′1″W
- Country: United States
- State: Wisconsin
- County: Dane
- Incorporated: August 29, 1938

Government
  - Type: City Council/Mayor
  - Mayor: Nancy Moore

Area
  - Total: 3.35 sq mi (8.68 km^{2})
  - Land: 3.26 sq mi (8.44 km^{2})
  - Water: 0.093 sq mi (0.24 km^{2})
- Elevation: 879 ft (268 m)

Population (2020)
  - Total: 8,624
  - Density: 2,508.3/sq mi (968.45/km^{2})
- Time zone: UTC-6 (Central (CST))
  - Summer (DST): UTC-5 (CDT)
- ZIP code: 53716
- Area code: 608
- FIPS code: 55-53675
- GNIS feature ID: 1569653
- Website: www.mymonona.com

Monona (/mɪˈnoʊnə/ mih-NOH-nə) is a city in Dane County, Wisconsin, United States. A suburb of the state capital, Madison, the city lies on the southeastern shore of Lake Monona, from which it takes its name. The population was 8,624 at the 2020 census. Monona is almost entirely surrounded by the City of Madison, save for a few short borders with the unincorporated town of Blooming Grove.

== History ==
Originally part of the Town of Blooming Grove, Monona was incorporated as a village on August 29, 1938. Prior to 1938, the area mainly consisted of farmland and summer homes. However, by 1938, permanent homes and small businesses had become much more common in the area. During the 1950s, Monona grew in population from 2,544 to 8,178.

In 1963, Monona built a community center and adjacent swimming pool. In 1967, a public library was built. In 1969, when Monona was incorporated as a city, a city hall was built across from the library. It houses all city operations, including the fire and police departments.

The Kohl's Food Store, Ray S. and Theo P. Owen House, Schroeder-Bohrod House, and Willard and Fern Tompkins House are listed on the National Register of Historic Places.

=== Indian mounds ===
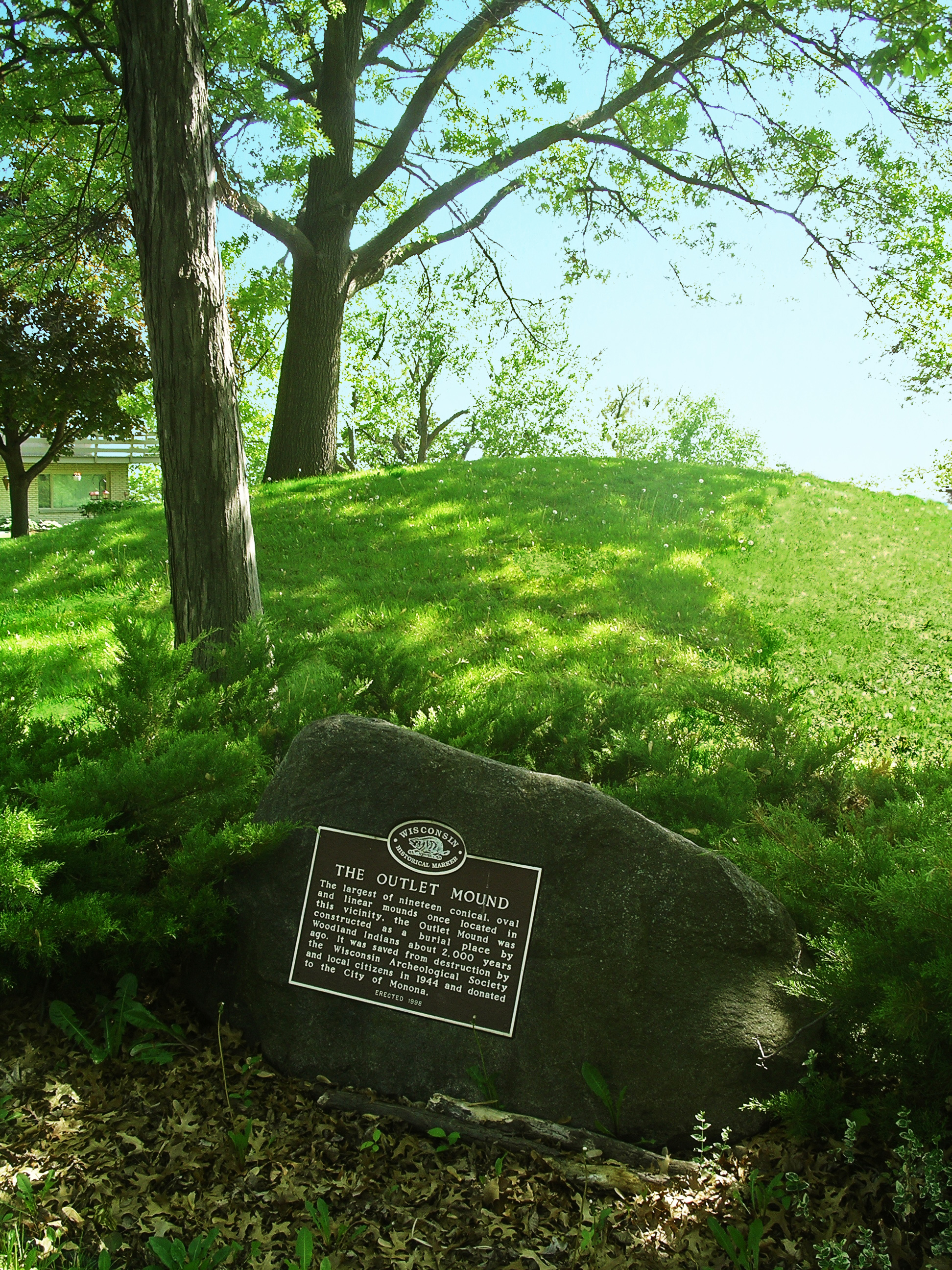
Outlet Mound marker

There are three pre-Columbian mounds in Monona listed on the National Register of Historic Places. The Monona Mound was built by Late Woodland people roughly between 700 and 1100. It may have been used to mark the spring equinox, as its orientation lines up with the sunset on either the first or second day after the equinox. It became the first mound protected under Wisconsin's Burial Sites Preservation Act. The Monona Landmarks Commission placed a historical marker at the site in 2020.

During the 1940s, the Outlet Mound was cut into during street construction, and skeletons were uncovered. This Indian burial mound was thought to have been built around 1,500 years ago by the Hopewell. In 1944, it was saved from destruction and donated to the city. The area where the mound was discovered, now known as Indian Mounds Park, is located at the corner of Midwood and Ridgewood Avenues.

The Tompkins-Brindler Mound Group is a group of mounds in Woodland Park. The group includes two linear mounds which are roughly 200 feet (61 m) and 210 feet (64 m) long. The mounds were built during the late Woodland period.

== Geography ==
Monona is located at 43°3′25″N 89°20′1″W (43.057029, -89.333716).

According to the United States Census Bureau, the city has a total area of 3.35 square miles (8.68 km^{2}), of which 3.26 square miles (8.44 km^{2}) is land and 0.09 square miles (0.23 km^{2}) is water.

== Demographics ==
Historical population
| Census | Pop. | Note | %± |
|---|---|---|---|
| 1940 | 1,323 | | — |
| 1950 | 2,544 | | 92.3% |
| 1960 | 8,178 | | 221.5% |
| 1970 | 10,420 | | 27.4% |
| 1980 | 8,809 | | −15.5% |
| 1990 | 8,637 | | −2.0% |
| 2000 | 8,018 | | −7.2% |
| 2010 | 7,533 | | −6.0% |
| 2020 | 8,624 | | 14.5% |
U.S. Decennial Census

=== 2010 census ===
As of the census of 2010, there were 7,533 people, 3,777 households, and 1,925 families living in the city. The population density was 2,310.7 inhabitants per square mile (892.2/km^{2}). There were 4,088 housing units at an average density of 1,254.0 per square mile (484.2/km^{2}). The racial makeup of the city was 92.5% White, 2.8% African American, 0.5% Native American, 1.4% Asian, 1.1% from other races, and 1.7% from two or more races. Hispanic or Latino of any race were 3.1% of the population.

There were 3,777 households, of which 20.0% had children under the age of 18 living with them, 40.0% were married couples living together, 8.2% had a female householder with no husband present, 2.8% had a male householder with no wife present, and 49.0% were non-families. 40.9% of all households were made up of individuals, and 15.6% had someone living alone who was 65 years of age or older. The average household size was 1.99 and the average family size was 2.71.

The median age in the city was 45.9 years. 16.9% of residents were under the age of 18; 6.7% were between the ages of 18 and 24; 24.9% were from 25 to 44; 32% were from 45 to 64; and 19.5% were 65 years of age or older. The gender makeup of the city was 47.7% male and 52.3% female.

=== 2000 census ===
As of the census of 2000, there were 3,768 households, and 2,053 families living in the city. The population density was 2,387.5 people per square mile (921.4/km^{2}). There were 3,922 housing units at an average density of 1,167.8 per square mile (450.7/km^{2}).

There were 3,768 households, out of which 23.9% had children under the age of 18 living with them, 43.3% were married couples living together, 8.2% had a female householder with no husband present, and 45.5% were non-families. 37.0% of all households were made up of individuals, and 13.8% had someone living alone who was 65 years of age or older. The average household size was 2.12 and the average family size was 2.80.

In the city, the population was spread out, with 20.5% under the age of 18, 6.8% from 18 to 24, 28.8% from 25 to 44, 26.3% from 45 to 64, and 17.6% who were 65 years of age or older. The median age was 41 years. For every 100 females, there were 91.2 males. For every 100 females age 18 and over, there were 88.1 males.

The median income for a household in the city was $48,034, and the median income for a family was $58,635. Males had a median income of $40,267 versus $30,912 for females. The per capita income for the city was $26,072. About 2.2% of families and 5.7% of the population were below the poverty line, including 5.9% of those under age 18 and 3.1% of those age 65 or over.

== Economy ==
Companies and organizations headquartered in Monona include the Sand County Foundation, Widen Enterprises, and WPS Health Solutions.

== Notable people ==
- Aaron Bohrod, artist
- Robb Kahl, lawyer and politician
- Mark F. Miller, politician
- Andy North, professional golfer and golf analyst for ESPN
- Byron Paine, lawyer, judge, and Wisconsin pioneer
- Robert D. Sundby, lawyer and jurist
- Ednah Shepard Thomas, college professor
