= Brookline High School =

Public high school in Brookline, Massachusetts

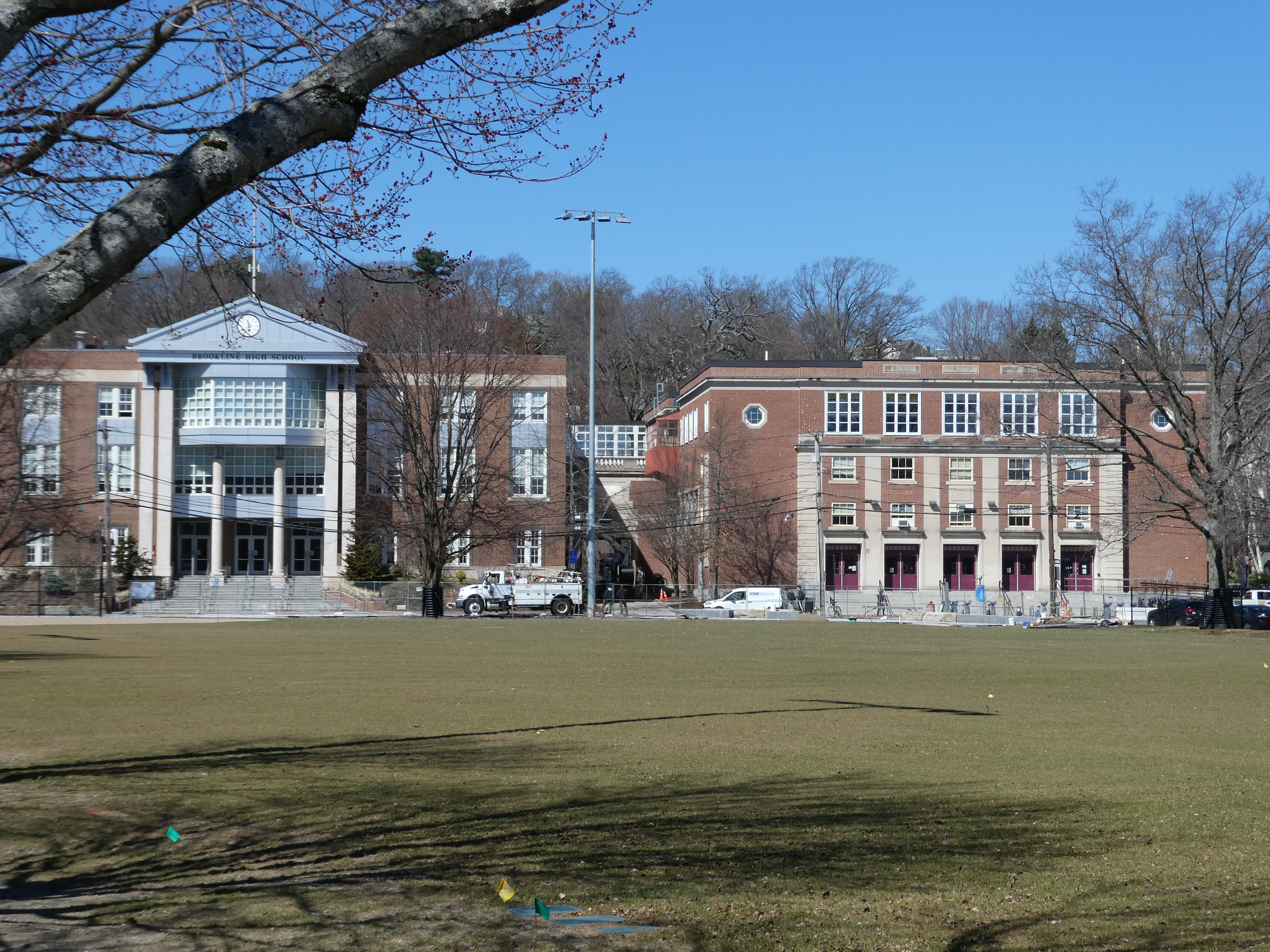

Location
- 115 Greenough Street; Brookline, Massachusetts 02445; 42°20′0″N 71°7′48″W

Information
- School type: Public, High School
- Established: 1843; 183 years ago
- School district: Public Schools of Brookline
- Headmaster: Anthony Meyer
- Teaching staff: 183.50 (FTE)
- Grades: 9–12
- Enrollment: 2,181 (2024-2025)
- Student to teacher ratio: 11.89
- Colors: Red; Blue
- Athletics conference: Bay State Conference
- Mascot: Spartan Warrior
- Team name: Warriors
- Newspaper: The Cypress
- Website: bhs.psbma.org

Brookline High School is a four-year public high school in Brookline, Massachusetts. It is a part of Public Schools of Brookline.

As of the 2023–24 school year, 2117 students were enrolled in the high school, served by 191.8 teachers (on an FTE basis), the student to teacher ratio was approximately 10.9 to 1. As of 2023, the enrolled student body race/ethnicity was self reported as 7.4% African American, 16.0% Asian, 12.9% Hispanic, 53.3% White, and 10.3% Multi-ethnic.

== History ==
=== 19th century ===
Brookline High School was founded in the Spring of 1843. Instruction began on August 17, 1843, on the lower floor of the Town Hall on Walnut Street, which was described by a former student as a "dismal, damp and dark room ... not unlike a tomb." Benjamin H. Rhodes, a Brown University graduate, was the founding headmaster, serving until 1847. Rhodes was succeeded as headmaster by Hezekia Shailer who served until 1854. John Emory Hoar, a Harvard College graduate, then served as headmaster for 33 years until 1888.

On November 3, 1856, the second Brookline High School location, a newly constructed two-story building on School Street designed by architect Joseph L. Richard, opened.

In fall 1895, the third and present location of Brookline High School opened as Shailer Hall, a new three and a half story brick structure with a pitched roof designed by architects Andrews, Jaques and Rantoul.

=== 20th century ===
In September 1903, the Manual Arts building, which was built at a cost of $100,000 on Tappan Street, opened. The ninth grade moved from the School of Practical Arts in the elementary schools to the high school in September 1921, following an addition to the main building, which increased the capacity to 1500 students.

In 1965, the main building was expanded and remodeled at a cost of $1.5 million.

The school has Symbolic Panels made by the sculptor John A. Wilson.

=== 21st century ===
In May 2018, Brookline voters supported a debt exclusion override to fund the expansion and renovation of Brookline High School. This building project included the construction of a new building at the 111 Cypress Street site, a new Science, Technology, Engineering, and Math (STEM) building to replace the building at the corner of Tappan and Greenough Streets, renovations to the 3rd floor of the main building and the Tappan gymnasium, as well as improvements to Cypress Field.

In early 2022, Brookline High School opened a new building on 22 Tappan Street, designed primarily to house freshmen.

== Academics ==
Brookline High School has received the gold medal for Best High Schools from U.S. News & World Report. Boston magazine has frequently ranked Brookline High School as one of the best high schools in Massachusetts for academic performance; in 2008, the magazine ranked Brookline High School top in the state.

In 2024, Boston magazine ranked Brookline High School as the 19th-best public school in Massachusetts. As of 2024, Brookline High School was ranked 50th nationally for STEM (Science, Technology, Engineering and Mathematics), according to U.S. News & World Report.

Although the Advanced Placement (AP) program at Brookline High School is smaller than at other high schools, it has grown dramatically over the past decade. In 2020–21, 435 students took 797 AP exams, and 91.9% of students scored "3" or above on these exams. In 2019, Brookline High School was ranked in the top 5% of the most challenging public high schools in America (952nd of 22,000). The rank was determined by the Challenge Index defined as the number of Advanced Placement, International Baccalaureate or Cambridge tests taken in a year relative to the number of seniors who graduate. In 2020, the 5-year graduation rate was 96.5% with 86% of students planning to attend a 4-Year private or public college.

== Athletics ==
Brookline High School features the largest interscholastic athletics program in New England, with 71 teams in 40 sports. Some of the atypical sports include squash, curling, golf, ultimate disc, crew, sailing, water polo, and rugby.

In 2014, Brookline High School rebranded their athletics program. The new logo featured a Spartan Warrior's helmet, successor to the arrowhead logo. A new color scheme was also introduced with navy blue replacing royal blue.

=== Boys crew ===
In 2013, the Brookline High School boys crew team took home their first national championship; the winning lightweight double featured athletes who would later go on to row on the lightweight teams at Cornell and Princeton universities.

In 2014, the boys took home a bronze at nationals in the openweight double, only to win another national title in the double in 2015. In 2016, the boys lightweight four won their regional championship, but fell short of a third national title, placing 5th at nationals.

=== Boys cross country ===
In 2007, the Brookline High School boys cross country team won the first ever Nike Team Nationals northeast regional meet by just one point over Danbury High School in Bowdoin Park, New York. They went on to place 7th at Nike Team Nationals in Portland, Oregon. In addition to the 2007 campaign, in the 2006 and 2009 seasons the team placed 3rd at the Massachusetts Division 1 State Meet, in 2005 they finished 2nd, and on November 20, 2010, won their second state championship, giving them their fifth top three finish in six years and second 1st-place finish in four. On November 19, 2011, they won their third state championship, for a run of three championships in five years.

In 2022, 2023, 2024, and 2025 the boys cross country team won the MIAA Division 1 State Championship marking a historic 4-peat (7th title in program history) under Coach Michael Glennon.

=== Boys soccer ===
In 2021, the boys soccer team won the MIAA Division 1 State Championship.

=== Volleyball ===
In 1978, the girls volleyball team won the MIAA State Championship. The boys volleyball team won the MIAA State Championship in 1989, 1990 and 1992. Under Head Coach Lexi De La Cruz, in 2025 the boys volleyball team won the MIAA Division 1 State Championship led by Kris Vaivars, Alec Smagula, Liam Raybould, Conor Christopher, Luka Gallucci, and Amir Tomer with a record of 23-1. In 2026 the boys volleyball team won the MIAA Division 1 State Championship led by Alec Smagula, Kais Al-Fakhuri, Liam Raybould, Luka Gallucci, Zach Spencer, and Amir Tomer with a record of 19-2.

=== Football ===
Since 1894, the Brookline High School football team has played rival Newton North High School in the traditional annual Thanksgiving Day game, one of the oldest high school football rivalries in Massachusetts and on the list of high school football rivalries more than 100 years old. As of late, however, their football team has struggled, finishing with 4 wins or more only four times since an appearance in the state championship in 1994 (2004, 2011, 2014, 2025). The last time Brookline beat Newton North was 2011.

=== Girls crew ===
In 2022, Brookline High School athletes finished third in the women's under-17 fours at Head of the Charles. Because the crew is not recognized as a school sport in the fall, the athletes rowed under the club name of Friends of Brookline Rowing, whose members are the same as those of the high school's spring rowing team. In 2023, the boys crew team took home two bronzes at regionals in the men's under-17 fours and men's youth second fours categories.

=== Girls' wrestling ===
In 1993, Brookline High School was the first public high school in the nation to organize and support a girls' wrestling team, which has since been duplicated by hundreds of high schools nationally.

=== Swimming & Diving ===
In 1985, the Brookline High School boys Swimming & Diving team won the MIAA State Championship.

=== Ultimate disc ===
The most popular athletics program at Brookline High School, as of 2017, is ultimate disc with over 110 students participating.

== School Within A School ==
School Within A School (SWS) is an alternative, democratic education program based in Brookline High School.

== The Cypress ==
The Cypress, formerly The Sagamore, is a school-affiliated newspaper published monthly by students of Brookline High School. The first issue appeared in January 1895. The newspaper is independent; the production is funded entirely through selling advertisements and subscriptions. It receives no funding from the high school.

Over the past few years, the paper has publicized and discussed issues in and around the school, including racism and teenage pregnancy. The school is noted for its tradition of high tolerance of sensitive topics discussed in the newspaper. In 2011, New England Scholastic Press Association awarded The Sagamore "Highest Achievement" in Newspaper Class I category.

== Notable incidents ==
- On September 25, 1936, Shailer Hall, the original Brookline High School building constructed in 1895, was destroyed by fire. One hundred and sixty firemen fought the fire with at least fourteen treated for injuries. The cause and origin of the fire was a defective incinerator flue in a chimney. Financial losses amounted to $3 million in 2022 dollars.
- In 2005, members of Fred Phelps' anti-gay Westboro Baptist Church protested at the graduation ceremony against Brookline High's strong acceptance of homosexuality. They were met by dozens of supporters and counter-protesters. Members from the Westboro Baptist Church protested again in 2009. They were met with about 2,000 counter-protesters, including students and members of Brookline High School's staff and various other groups from surrounding areas.
- In November 2017, Brookline High School students coordinated a walkout concerning the racial climate present through the high school. This event occurred after the spread of student produced videos containing racial slurs. The incident made local news and sparked discussion.
- In May 2020, amidst the COVID-19 pandemic, hundreds of Brookline High School teachers were laid off due to lack of funding. This was met with criticism on a local level, causing protests and criticisms on the management of the school's administration.

== Notable alumni ==
- Jeff Adrien 2004, former professional basketball player, Golden State Warriors, Houston Rockets, and Charlotte Bobcats
- Eddie Andelman 1954, Boston radio personality.
- Lenny Baker 1962, Tony Award-winning actor, I Love My Wife
- Michael Bluestein 1987, musician and keyboardist, Foreigner
- Marita Bonner 1922, writer, essayist, and playwright of Harlem Renaissance
- Safra Catz 1979, CEO, Oracle Corporation
- Hugh B. Cave 1927, short story writer
- Jim Davis 1961, chairman, New Balance
- James Driscoll 1996, professional golfer on PGA Tour
- Kitty Dukakis 1954, former First Lady of Massachusetts
- Michael Dukakis 1951, 1988 Democratic presidential nominee and former Governor of Massachusetts.
- Theo Epstein 1991, former general manager, Boston Red Sox
- Richard N. Goodwin 1949, author, columnist, and speechwriter for presidents John F. Kennedy and Lyndon Johnson
- David Hazony 1987, author, columnist, editor, and translator
- John Hodgman 1989, humorist and author, Apple's Get a Mac advertising campaign
- Hanako Jimi 1994, Japanese politician
- Sam Kennedy 1991, president, Boston Red Sox.
- George Kenney 1907, U.S. Air Force general during World War II
- Robert C. Kingston 1947, U.S. Army General
- Robert Kraft 1959, owner, New England Patriots
- Albert and David Maysles 1944 and 1949, documentary filmmakers, Salesman, Gimme Shelter, and Grey Gardens
- Nicholas McCarthy 1988, film director
- Vaughn Meader 1953, comedian and John F. Kennedy impersonator
- Fred Newman 1960, former professional baseball player, Los Angeles Angels
- Conan O'Brien 1981, comedian, writer, and TV host
- Rebecca Onie 1994, population health advocate and MacArthur Fellow
- Thomas G. Osenton 1971, economist, author, former CEO The Sporting New Publishing Company
- Francis Ouimet 1911, amateur golfer and 1913 U.S. Open winner
- Paul Pender 1949, world middleweight boxing champion
- Thais M. Plaisted, 1916, educator, writer, and parliamentarian
- Alan L. Rachins 1960, actor, Dharma and Greg, L.A. Law
- Eli "Paperboy" Reed 2002, musician
- Jonathon Riley 1997, 2004 Olympian in the 5000m run and three-time U.S. champion, 2001 NCAA champion.
- Dan Rosenthal 1984, member of White House senior staff under Bill Clinton
- Larry Ruttman 1948, attorney and author
- Gabe Sapolsky 1990, pro wrestling promoter, ECW and Ring of Honor
- Lew Schneider 1979, producer, Everybody Loves Raymond and American Dad!
- Nick Scott 2014, American football safety in the NFL, Super Bowl LVI champion
- David Susskind 1938, TV producer and host, The David Susskind Show
- Ednah Shepard Thomas 1919, English professor, University of Wisconsin.
- Alan Trefler 1973, founder and CEO, Pegasystems, and chess master
- Daneliya Tuleshova 2024, singer, The Voice Kids Ukraine, America's Got Talent
- Mike Wallace 1935, former journalist, 60 Minutes
- Joe "Tweet" Walsh 1934, former professional baseball player, Boston Bees
- Rick Weitzman 1963, former professional basketball player, Boston Celtics.
- John Yau 1968, Jackson Poetry Prize-winning poet and critic
- David Zuckerman 1989, 81st lieutenant governor of Vermont
- Danzy Senna 1988, author
