= Thrivent =

Member-owned provider of insurance and other financial services

Coordinates: 44.975007°N 93.265831°W

Thrivent Financial for Lutherans
- Predecessor: Aid Association for Lutherans; Lutheran Brotherhood
- Formation: January 1, 2002
- Type: Not-for-profit membership organization
- Legal status: Fraternal benefit society Not-for-profit organization
- Location(s): Minneapolis, Minnesota; Appleton, Wisconsin, United States
- Region served: Global
- Services: Financial services
- Members: Approx. 2.5 million (January 1, 2025);
- Key people: Teresa Rasmussen, President & CEO - Lynn Crump-Caine, Chair of the board- Carolyn Sakstrup, Chief Growth & Generosity Officier
- Employees: Corporate: Approx. 4,500; Financial representatives: Approx. 3,500
- Website: www.thrivent.com
- Formerly called: Thrivent Financial for Lutherans (2002–2014); Thrivent Financial (2014–2020)

Thrivent Financial for Lutherans (marketing name Thrivent) (/ˈθraɪvɪnt/ THRYVE-int) is an American Fortune 500 not-for-profit financial services organization headquartered in Minneapolis, Minnesota, and Appleton, Wisconsin, and founded by Lutherans. As a member-owned fraternal benefit society, it operates under a chapter system, serving nearly 2.3 million members.

Operating through its local chapters nationwide, Thrivent and its subsidiaries offer financial products and services including life insurance, annuities, mutual funds, disability income insurance, credit union products, money management, brokerage services, and retirement planning.

The organization and its members provide volunteer services to charitable organizations and schools. For example, Thrivent members reportedly volunteered more than 8.6 million hours in 2013 and contributed $182.7 million in that year to organizations and activities that aim to strengthen families and communities.

In June 2013, members voted to allow non-Lutheran Christians to join, and as a result in March 2014 the marketing name for Thrivent Financial for Lutherans was shortened to Thrivent Financial. In the summer of 2020, the marketing name was changed to Thrivent.

== Predecessor groups ==
Thrivent Financial was officially formed on January 1, 2002, with the merger of Aid Association for Lutherans (AAL) and Lutheran Brotherhood (LB), which had been established in 1902 and 1917 respectively. The merger formed the largest fraternal benefit society in the United States.

=== Aid Association for Lutherans ===
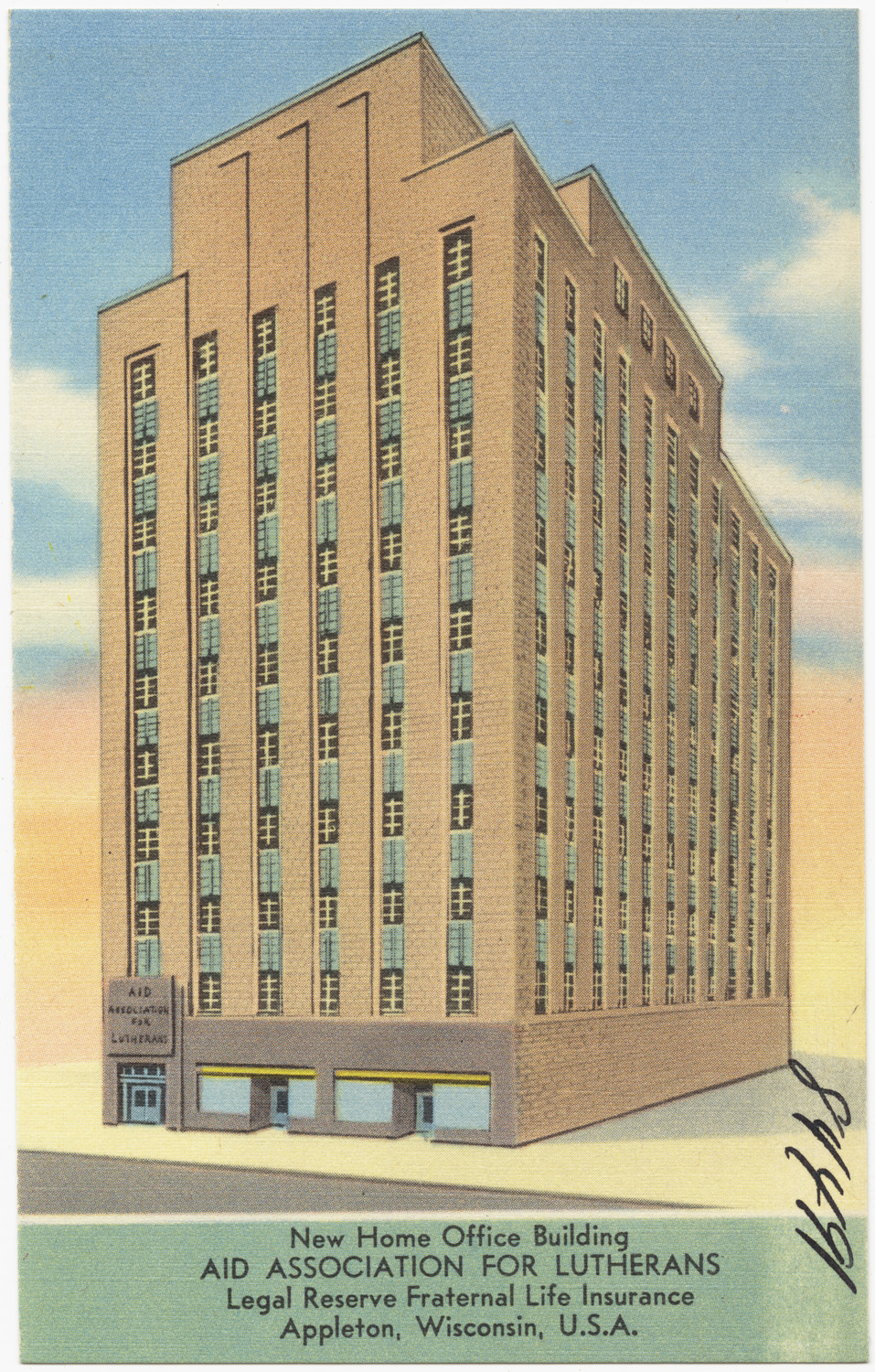
Head Office of the Aid Association for Lutherans, circa 1930–1945

==== History ====
In the late 19th and early 20th century, the Lutheran Church–Missouri Synod forbade its members to join fraternal societies because they required initiation rites and secret oaths. Life insurance was also frowned upon in some quarters since Martin Luther had written against similar enterprises in his day, as the practice could be considered a form of usury and reflected distrust in God.

In 1899, Albert Voecks, a member of St. Paul Lutheran Church in Appleton, Wisconsin, broached the idea of creating an insurance society for Lutherans to fellow church members Gottlieb Ziegler and William Zuehlke. They each gave $13 to the fund, and found several hundred others willing to contribute $5 each. In 1902, the founders of the society recruited the 500 applicants necessary to receive a charter from the State of Wisconsin for their group. It was chartered on November 24, 1902, as the Aid Association for Lutherans in Wisconsin and Other States.

Like most fraternal benefit societies of the time, the AAL operated on the actuarially unsound graded assessment system. In 1905, it began a move to the legal reserve system, a transformation that was completed in 1911. Women were also admitted as members in 1905. Most of the early business was conducted in German, until this was discontinued in 1927.

Membership was open only to members of the Missouri Synod and other Lutherans who were in fellowship with it until the mid-1960s, when it became open to Lutherans of all denominations. In the late 1960s, the association had 792,000 members, which increased to about 1.2 million members in 5,019 branches in 1978. By 1979, it was the largest member of the National Fraternal Congress of America and ranked 13th among the 1,800 insurance firms in the country.

==== Nonprofit organization ====
The association was organized on two levels: the local branches attached to Lutheran congregations and the national level, which consisted only of a board of directors that met four times a year. The AAL was particular about its locals not being called "lodges" because that was too similar to the nomenclature of oath-bound, ritualistic groups such as the Freemasons or the Oddfellows. The AAL was headquartered in Appleton, Wisconsin.

==== Philanthropy ====
The AAL was also involved philanthropically, giving money to scholarships, support for educational institutions and training for church workers. Grants were made to agencies, boards, minorities, and homes for the aged and disabled. The association also had its own family health program and sponsored blood drives and family health workshops. It joined the National Center for Voluntary Action.

=== Lutheran Brotherhood ===
==== History ====
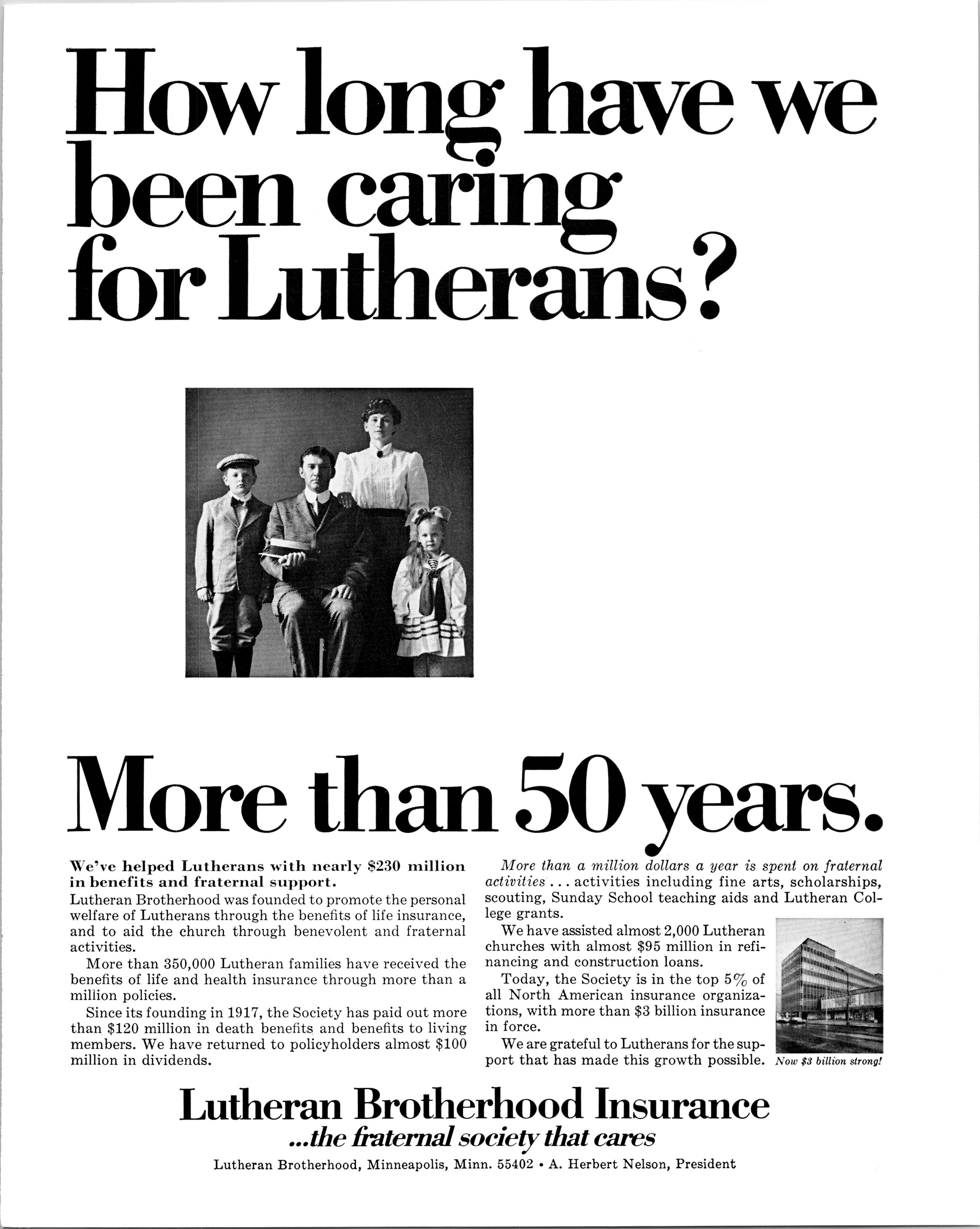
A 1969 advertisement for Lutheran Brotherhood in Greater Minneapolis

The Lutheran Brotherhood dates to the founding convention of the Norwegian Lutheran Church of America, when J. A. O. Preus, Minnesota's state insurance commissioner, proposed launching a not-for-profit aid society. As with other Lutheran denominations, this move proved controversial, with some saying it indicated lack of faith in God. Those who favored the society prevailed by arguing that the aid society would prevent Norwegian Lutherans from joining unacceptable secret beneficial societies or "lodges", which was forbidden by conservative Lutheran doctrine.

The organization authorized by the convention was called the Luther Union, and was incorporated in the state of Minnesota on September 18, 1918. That month, the Luther Union entered into negotiations with Lutheran Brotherhood of America of Des Moines, Iowa. These two organizations merged in the Lutheran Brotherhood in 1920.

The articles of incorporation of Lutheran Brotherhood stated its purpose:

To aid the Lutheran Church in extending the Lutheran Faith, to foster patriotism, loyalty, justice, charity and benevolence, to provide education, instruction, proper entertainment and amusements, to encourage industry, saving, thrift and development on the part of its members, to give aid in the case of poverty, sickness, accident or old age, and otherwise promote the spiritual, intellectual and physical welfare of its members.

Membership was open only to Lutherans. There were 550,000 members in 1965 and 900,000 in 1979.

==== Non-profit organization ====
Local units were called "branches", and were divided into three categories: A-1, affiliated to Lutheran congregations; A-2, usually sponsored by a group within a Lutheran parish; and A-3, geographic branches. The Lutheran Brotherhood had a quadrennial convention and a board of directors who managed its business. It was headquartered in Minneapolis.

==== Philanthropy ====
The LB helped establish new Lutheran congregations through the Church Extension Fund, sponsored scholarships for Lutheran clergy, and arranged seminars on Christian topics.

=== Mergers ===
==== Lutheran Life Insurance Society of Canada ====
In 1972, the Canadian branches of the Lutheran Brotherhood and the Aid Association for Lutherans merged as a result of the desire for an indigenous Canadian fraternal benefit society. They formed a new fraternal order called the Faith Life. Like the AAL and LB, the LLISC was organized into branches and run by a board of directors. There were 120 branches in 1979. The society was based in Kitchener, Ontario. The LLISC provided scholarships to Lutheran educational institutions, gave grants to churches and church-related organizations and projects, and gave reduced-rate mortgages for Lutheran churches.

==== Thrivent Financial for Lutherans ====
The AAL and LB functioned independently throughout the 20th century. In June 2001, after close consideration of how combining the two organizations would benefit members, the AAL and LB merged, with the merger completed by the end of that year. After the merger, in 2002, a new name was voted upon and approved by the members of the merged organization: Thrivent Financial for Lutherans.

== Financial services ==
Thrivent provides advice center products.

== Financial standing ==
In 2016, Thrivent Financial ranked 318 on the Fortune 500 and received an A.M. Best rating of AA+ (Superior) and a Fitch rating of AA+ (Very Strong).

== Outreach ==
Thrivent members made donations to Haiti relief following the 2010 Haiti earthquake through Lutheran World Relief, ELCA Domestic Disaster Response, LCMS World Relief/Human Care, and WELS Committee on Relief. Thrivent Financial provided funding for the 2003 film Luther.

=== Thrivent Choice ===
Through its Thrivent Choice program, members gave $43 million in 2016. The program offers members the opportunity to make recommendations for where some of Thrivent's charitable outreach funds are directed. The list of charities comes from members and non-profits can apply to be eligible for choice dollars.

=== Thrivent builds with Habitat for Humanity ===
Thrivent has formed an alliance with Habitat for Humanity called Thrivent Builds with Habitat for Humanity through which it contributes financial assistance for building affordable homes. The initiative also sponsors homebuilding trips by Thrivent members throughout the world.

The Thrivent Builds alliance began in September 2005, with a four-year commitment of $105 million. Thrivent Financial chose Habitat for Humanity as an ally because, in the previous ten years, its members had already proven their interest in volunteering with them by building over 500 homes. In December 2007, Thrivent Financial increased its total commitment to $125 million. The alliance makes Thrivent Financial one of Habitat's largest single allies and aims to increase Habitat's annual house production by hundreds of U.S. homes per year and more around the world.

==== Programs ====
There are two programs within the Thrivent Builds alliance.

- Through Thrivent Builds Homes, Thrivent Financial and other Lutheran volunteers help build more than 300 homes a year within the United States with more than 200 Habitat for Humanity affiliates. By year-end 2008, over 1,000 homes had been built with Habitat for Humanity families through this program.
- Thrivent Builds Worldwide offers Thrivent Financial members the opportunity to volunteer for one- to three-week homebuilding trips around the world where there are existing Habitat for Humanity programs. Thrivent Builds volunteers have helped build Habitat homes in Romania, Poland, South Africa, New Zealand, Guatemala, El Salvador, the Mississippi Gulf Coast and many more destinations.

Additionally, there are two whole communities being built:

- In the Mississippi Gulf Coast, Thrivent Builds is sponsoring a community of 28 homes with families displaced by Hurricanes Katrina and Rita.
- An additional community of 75 homes is being sponsored in Santa Ana, El Salvador, with 40 teams of Thrivent volunteers helping to build in 2009.

=== Library ===
Aid Association for Lutherans maintained a library of over 12,000 books on business management, fraternalism, and life and health insurance.

== Recognition ==
Since 2012, Thrivent has been named on the list of The World's Most Ethical Companies, thirteen years running, by Ethisphere Magazine. Assessment is based upon the Ethisphere Institute's Ethics Quotient (EQ) framework which offers a quantitative way to assess a company's performance in an objective, consistent and standardized way. Scores are generated in five key categories: ethics and compliance program (35%), corporate citizenship and responsibility (20%), culture of ethics (20%), governance (15%) and leadership, innovation and reputation (10%), and provided to all companies who participate in the process.

== See also ==
- Lutheranism in North America
