= Tompkins-Brindler Mound Group =

- U.S. National Register of Historic Places
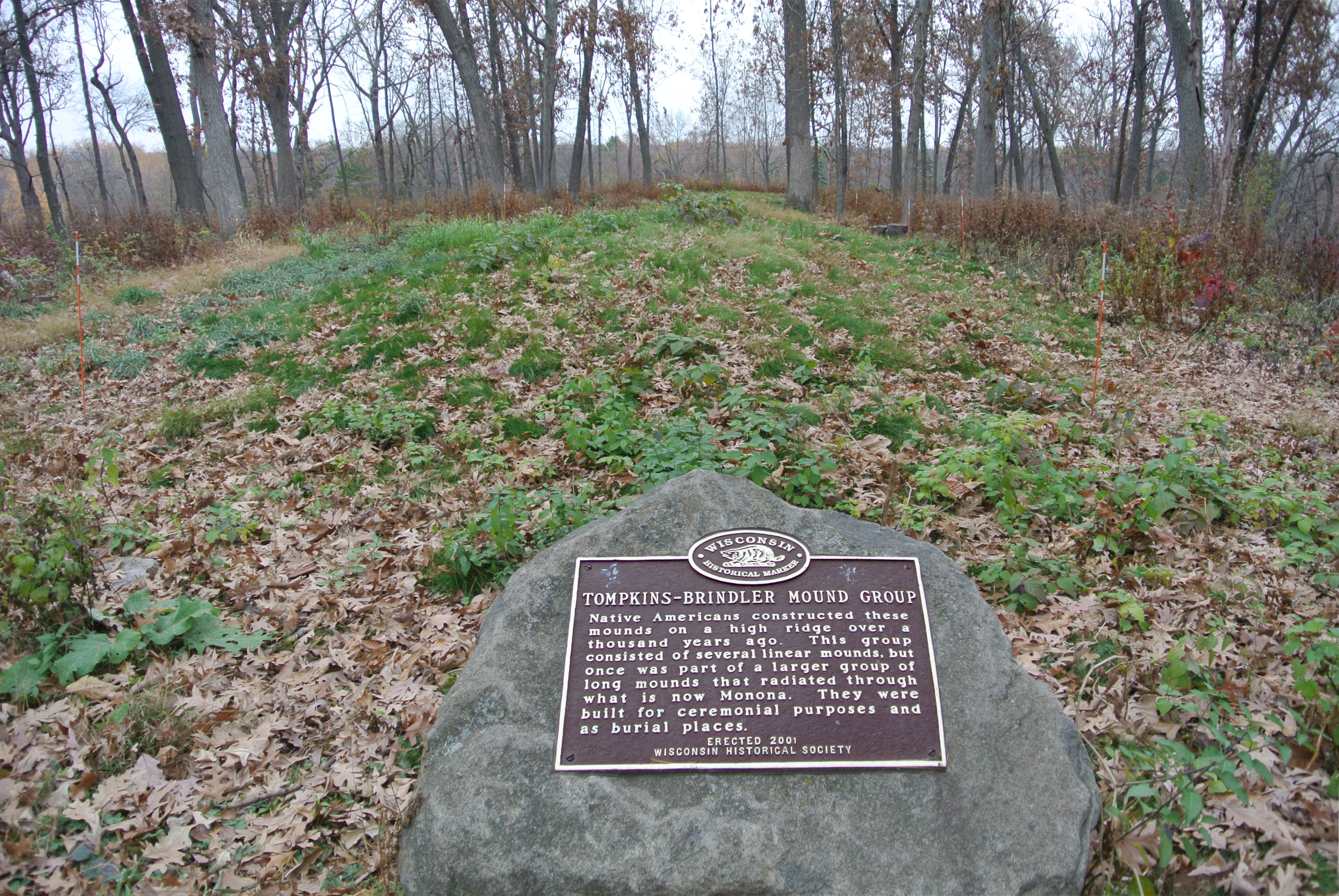

- Location within Wisconsin
- Location: Woodland Park, Monona, Wisconsin
- Coordinates: 43°03′18″N 89°19′28″W
- Area: less than one acre
- MPS: Late Woodland Stage in Archeological Region 8 MPS
- NRHP reference No.: 03001023
- Added to NRHP: October 9, 2003

The Tompkins-Brindler Mound Group is a group of Native American mounds in Woodland Park in Monona, Wisconsin. The group includes two linear mounds which are roughly 200 feet (61 m) and 210 feet (64 m) long. While there were once fifteen mounds in the group, including another group to the southwest called the Nichols Mound Group, the other mounds have all been destroyed. The mounds were built during the Late Woodland period, which covers roughly 500 to 1200 A.D., and during which most mounds in southern Wisconsin were constructed. While the purpose of linear mounds such as those in the Tompkins-Brindler group is uncertain, they are thought to have had religious or spiritual significance to the Late Woodland people.

The site was added to the National Register of Historic Places on October 9, 2003.
