= Outlet Mound =

- U.S. National Register of Historic Places
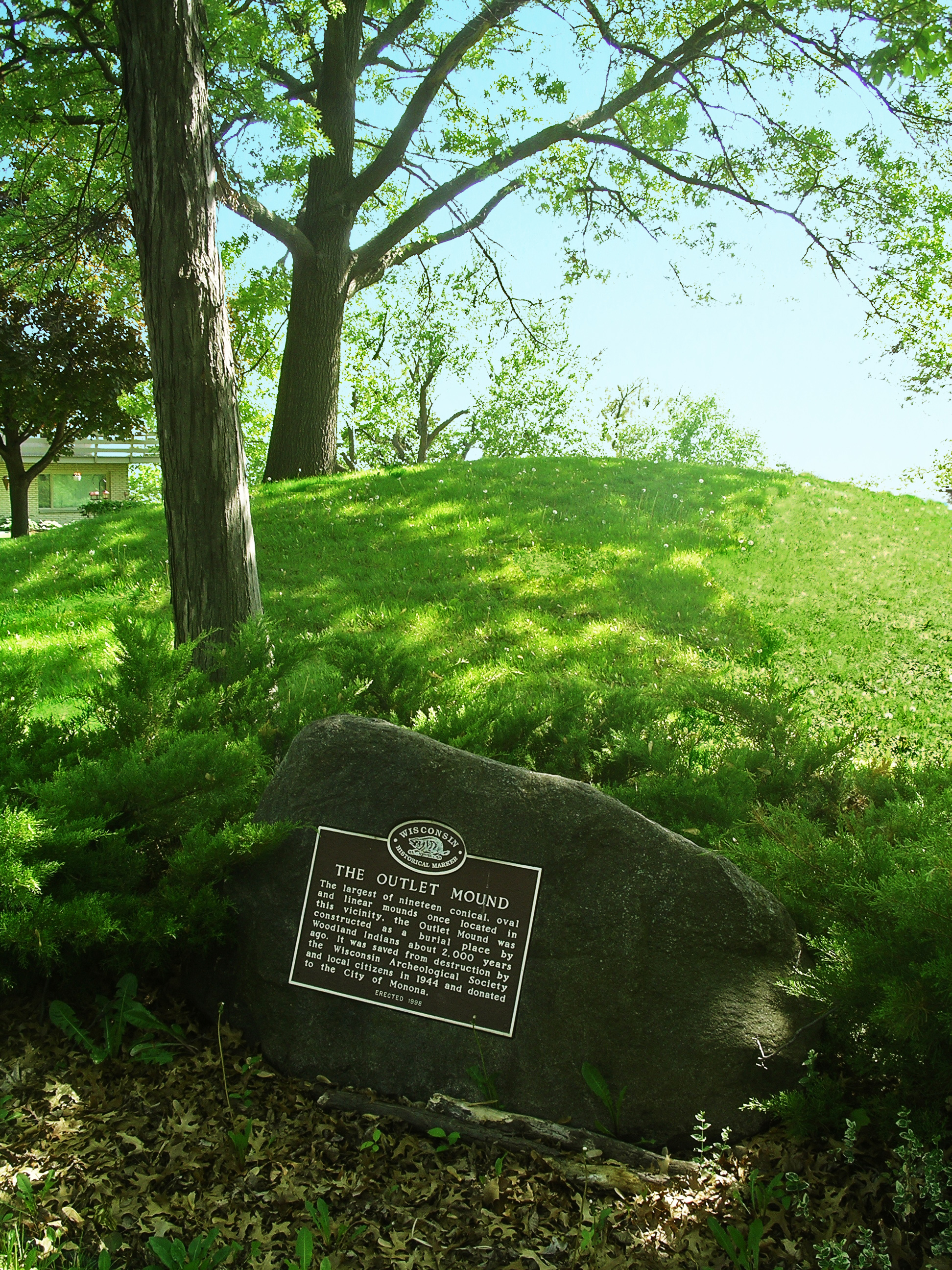
- Outlet Mound
- Location: Monona, Wisconsin
- NRHP reference No.: 03001022
- Added to NRHP: October 9, 2003

The Outlet Mound is an conical burial mound located at the outlet of Lake Monona - now near the junction of Midwood and Ridgewood Avenues in Monona, Wisconsin. It was added to the National Register of Historic Places in 2003.

== History ==
The Outlet Mound is the sole surviving mound of what originally was a group of 19 conical, oval, and linear mounds at this site. Sixty feet around and seven feet high, it was the largest of that group. It was constructed as a Native American burial ground. One of the destroyed mounds in the group was radio-carbon dated to 50 BC; this mound is probably from that era. In 1944, it was saved from destruction and donated to the City of Monona.
