= Monona Mound =

- Monona Mound (47DA275)
- U.S. National Register of Historic Places
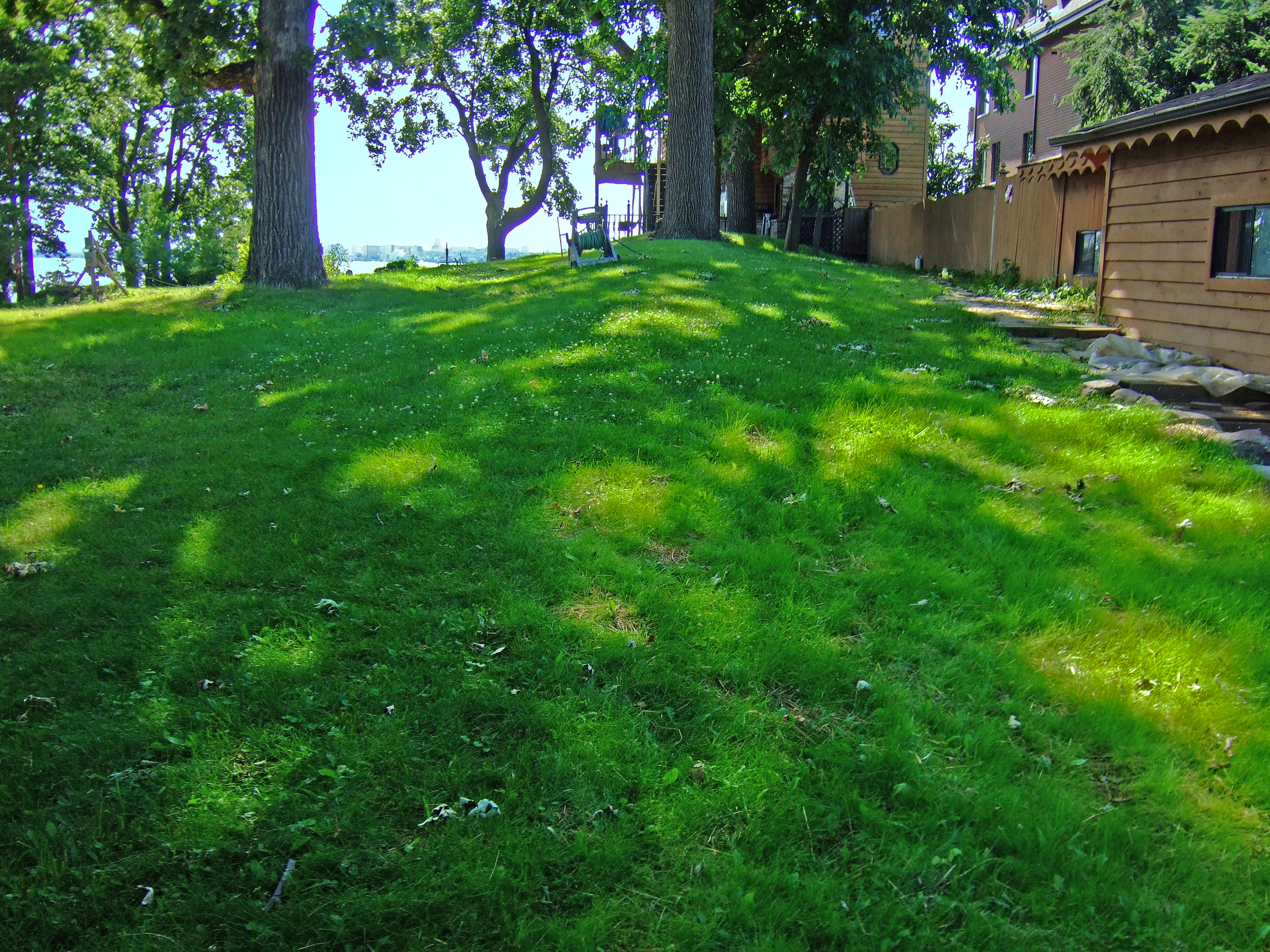

- Location within Wisconsin
- Location: 4009 Monona Dr., Monona, Wisconsin
- Coordinates: 43°04′56″N 89°19′29″W
- Area: less than one acre
- NRHP reference No.: 89002064
- Added to NRHP: December 1, 1989

The Monona Mound is a Native American mound at 4009 Monona Drive in Monona, Wisconsin. The mound has a club shape, with a cone at one end and a long linear tail. It was once part of a group with another club-shaped mound and two conical mounds, but the other mounds have been destroyed. The mound was built by Late Woodland people roughly between 700 and 1100 A.D. It may have been used to mark the spring equinox, as its orientation lines up with the sunset either the first or second day after the equinox.

The mound is located on private property which was once owned by violin maker Knute Reindahl; as Reindahl had learned wood carving from Native Americans, he and his family preserved the mound. When Reindahl's descendants sold the mound in the 1980s, it became the first mound protected under Wisconsin's Burial Sites Preservation Act. The mound was listed on the National Register of Historic Places on December 1, 1989. The Monona Landmarks Commission placed a historical marker at the site in 2020.
