= Thais M. Plaisted =

American writer (1898–1983)

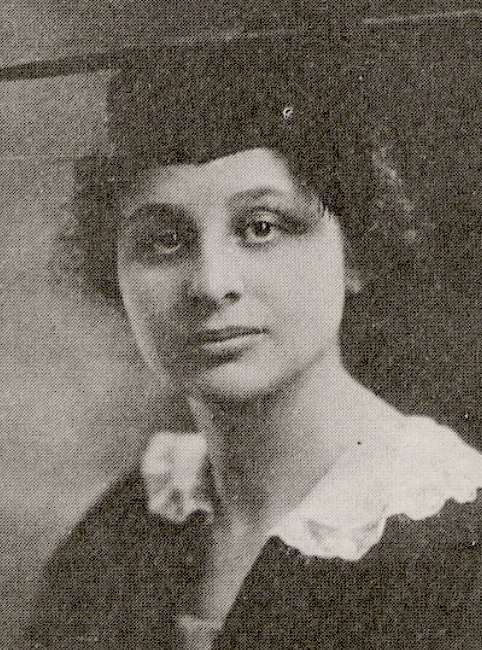
- Thais M. Plaisted, from the 1920 yearbook of Radcliffe College
- Born: January 14, 1898; San Francisco, California
- Died: February 3, 1983; Los Angeles, California
- Occupation(s): Writer, educator, political scientist, parliamentarian

Thais Margaret Plaisted (January 14, 1898 – February 3, 1983) was an American writer, political scientist, parliamentarian, and educator.

== Early life ==
Thais Margaret Plaisted was born in San Francisco, California, and raised in Boise, Idaho and Boston, the daughter of Paul Jones "Joe" Plaisted and Annie Margaret Ryan Plaisted. She graduated from Brookline High School in Massachusetts, then from Radcliffe College in 1920. She earned a master's degree at the University of Southern California. Her master's thesis, based on her research at the Huntington Library and other collections, was titled "The Embargo of 1757, with reference to the Trade between the Northern British-American Colonies and the British West Indies and the Neutral Islands" (1942).

== Career ==
Plaisted taught school in Idaho and at Hollywood High School in Los Angeles, California. She wrote textbooks, and she lectured on historical and political topics to women's groups in Southern California, Sometimes with color slides for illustration. She represented the South Pacific Section at the 1939 convention of the American Association of University Women, held in Denver. She was press chairman of the Los Angeles County chapter of the California Federation of Women's Clubs, and active in the California History and Landmarks Club, and the Daughters of the American Revolution.

Plaisted wrote articles on the finer points of parliamentary procedure, and taught classes in the subject to adults and youth in the 1940s and 1950s. She served as a parliamentarian for various women's clubs in Los Angeles, helped to organize the Los Angeles chapter of the National Association of Parliamentarians, and for the White House Conference on Families in 1980.

== Publications ==
- An Integrated Course in Art Appreciation (1935)
- "Origins of National Nominating Committees and Platforms" (1939)
- "Juan Fernandez: Robinson Crusoe Island" (1942)
- "The Unpublished Papers of Frederick Jackson Turner" (1943)
- "Five Famous Lincoln Statues" (1943)
- "The Importance of International Law in Our Thinking Today" (1944)
- "General Henry M. Robert: Parliamentarian" (1957)
- "The Vice Presidency of the United States" (1959)
- "International Law for Space" (1964)
- "The Quorum" (1965)
- Parliamentary Law Exercises (1967)
- "The Proviso: An Enigma" (1978)
- "Thomas Jefferson: Parliamentarian" (1978)
- "The When, Why, and Where of the Second" (1978)

== Personal life ==
Plaisted died in Los Angeles in 1983, aged 85 years. Her grave is with her mother's, at Forest Lawn Cemetery in Glendale, California.
