= Thomas G. Osenton =

Thomas George Osenton, nicknamed Tom, is an American publisher and author. He was president, chief executive officer and publisher of The Sporting News Publishing Company.

== Personal ==
Osenton was born April 9, 1953, in Boston, Massachusetts. He is a graduate of the University of New Hampshire, Brookline High School and Phillips Exeter Academy.

== Vocation ==
=== Media ===
Osenton was press chief for ice hockey at the 1980 Winter Olympics in Lake Placid, New York, and directed the press operations for the tournament that resulted in the 1980 U.S. Hockey team's Gold medal Miracle on Ice. He later was employed at the ABC Television Network in New York, primarily as network spokesperson focusing on the 1984 Winter Olympics in Sarajevo and Summer Olympics that year in Los Angeles.

Beginning in 1989, he was president and chief operating officer of Sporting News Publishing Company, where he was also publisher of The Sporting News weekly as well as Sporting Goods Dealer monthly - the industry's trade journal. He was previously publisher of Billboard's American Artist magazine beginning in 1986.

=== Authorship ===
Osenton is author of three business-school textbooks: Customer Share Marketing (Financial Times Prentice Hall, 2002) Death of Demand (Financial Times Prentice Hall, 2004) and Boomer Destiny: Leading the U.S. Through the Worst Crisis Since the Great Depression (Praeger Publishers, 2009).

He wrote about the economic theory of innovation saturation in his 2004 book, The Death of Demand: Finding Growth in a Saturated Global Economy (Financial Times Prentice Hall).
