= Dan K. Rosenthal =

American government official

Dan K. Rosenthal is a native of Brookline, Massachusetts, and an alumnus of Brookline High School.

Rosenthal served on the White House senior staff as Assistant to the President and Director of Advance (1997–2000), and as Special Assistant to the President and Deputy Director of Advance (1995–1997) under President Bill Clinton.

Before his time at the White House, Rosenthal worked at the International Trade Administration of the U.S. Department of Commerce, and at the U.S. Agency for International Development.

He is Managing Principal at Albright Stonebridge Group, a leading global strategy firm.

Rosenthal received his B.A. from the University of Rochester, and his J.D from Tulane University Law School and the Georgetown University Law Center.

In 2013 he was appointed to serve on the U.S. Department of State's Advisory Committee on International Economic Policy.
