= St. Paul Evangelical Lutheran Church (Appleton, Wisconsin) =

Historic church in Wisconsin, United States

- St. Paul Evangelic Lutheran Church
- U.S. National Register of Historic Places
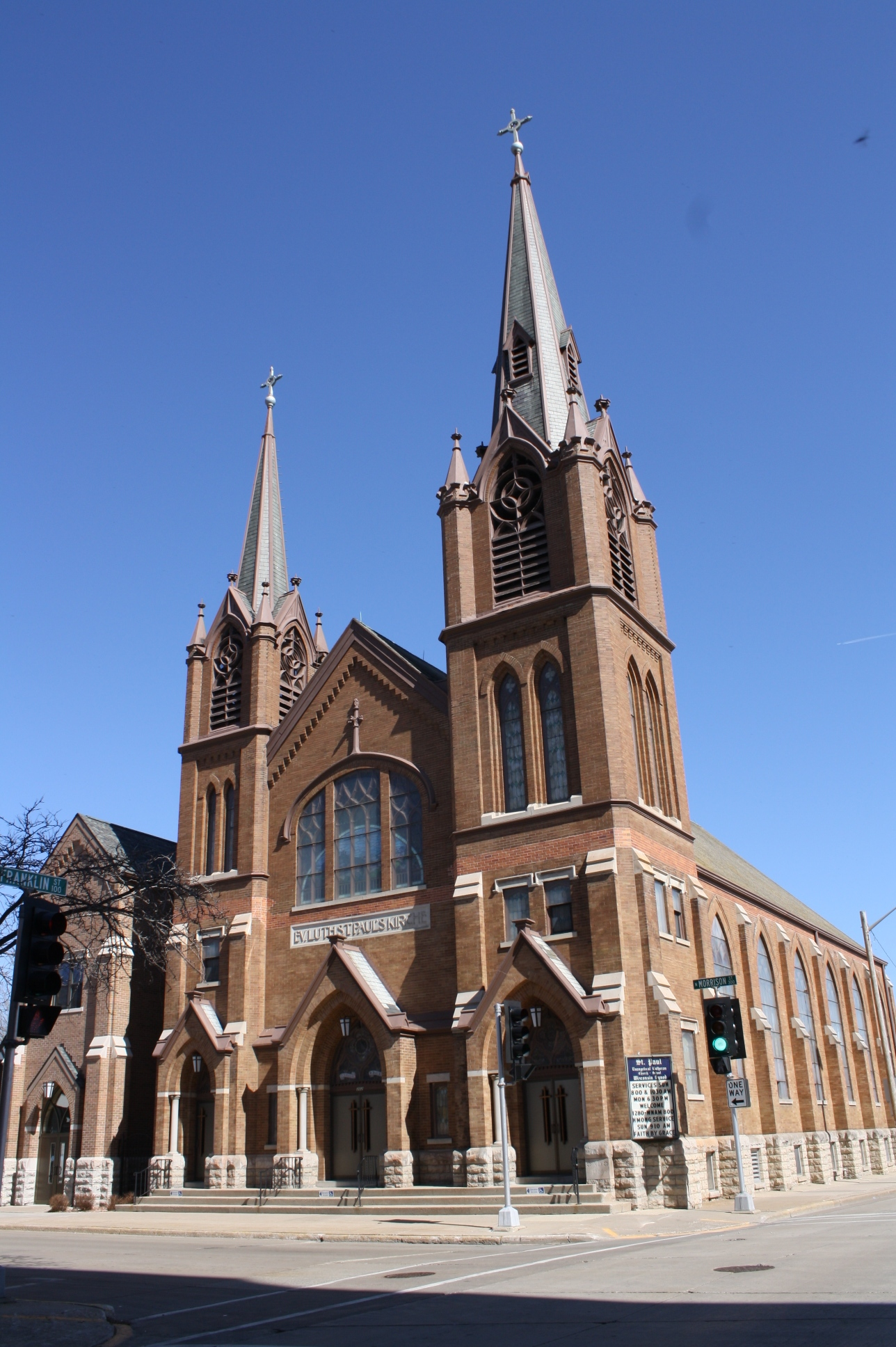
- St. Paul Evangelical Lutheran Church
- Location: 302 N. Morrison St. Appleton, Wisconsin
- Coordinates: 44.26418°N 88.40401°W
- Built: 1907
- Architectural style: Late Gothic Revival
- NRHP reference No.: 08000287
- Added to NRHP: April 11, 2008

St. Paul Evangelical Lutheran Church is a Lutheran church in Appleton, Wisconsin, affiliated with the Wisconsin Evangelical Lutheran Synod.

The building was constructed in 1907. It was added to the National Register of Historic Places in 2008 for its architectural significance.
