= College Avenue Historic District (Appleton, Wisconsin) =

Historic district in Wisconsin, United States

- U.S. National Register of Historic Places
- U.S. Historic district
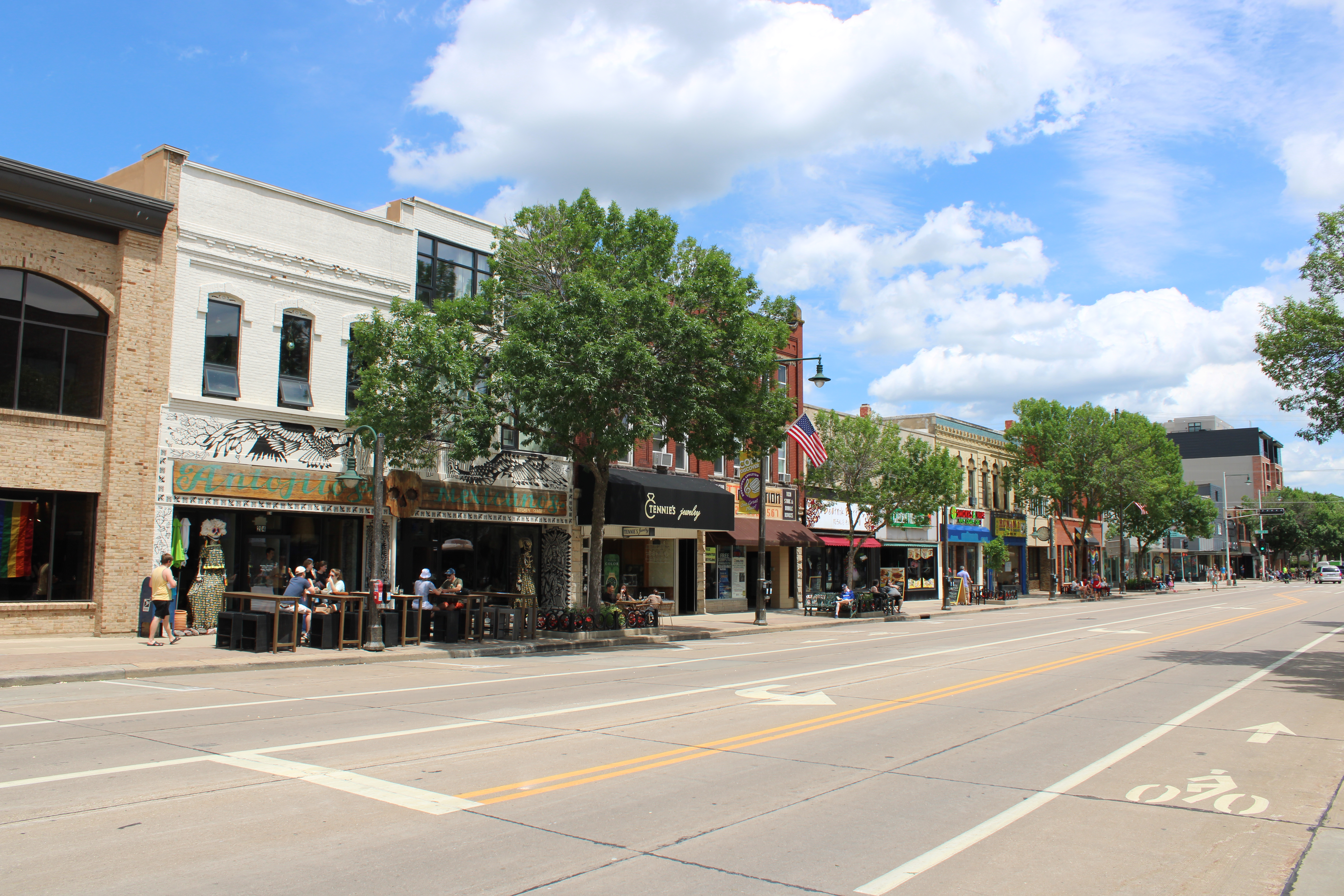

- Location within Wisconsin Location within the United States
- Location: 215 W. to 109 E., and 110 W. to 102 E. College Ave.; 106-114n. Onida St., Appleton, Wisconsin
- Coordinates: 44°15′42″N 88°24′21″W
- Area: 7 acres (2.8 ha)
- Architect: Multiple
- Architectural style: Mixed (more Than 2 Styles From Different Periods)
- NRHP reference No.: 82001848
- Added to NRHP: December 2, 1982

The College Avenue Historic District in Appleton, Wisconsin is a 7-acre (2.8 ha) historic district that was listed on the National Register of Historic Places in 1982. In 1982, it included 27 buildings deemed to contribute to the historic character of the area, one of which is the 12 story Zuelke Building, and one contributing object, the Soldiers Square Civil War Monument.

The contributing buildings include:

- Zuelke Building, 103 W. College Avenue, a twelve-story gray granite building. Its interior is one of few intact original interiors

in the district.

- Gibson's Auto Exchange, at 211 W. College Avenue, Art Deco.
- Bissing Building, 203-205 W. College Avenue, with lions' heads in its roofline pediments. In 1982 two commercial establishments, Boot Hill and Brown Beam Tavern, occupied the building.
