= Appleton Locks 1–3 Historic District =

Historic district in Wisconsin, United States

- U.S. National Register of Historic Places
- U.S. Historic district
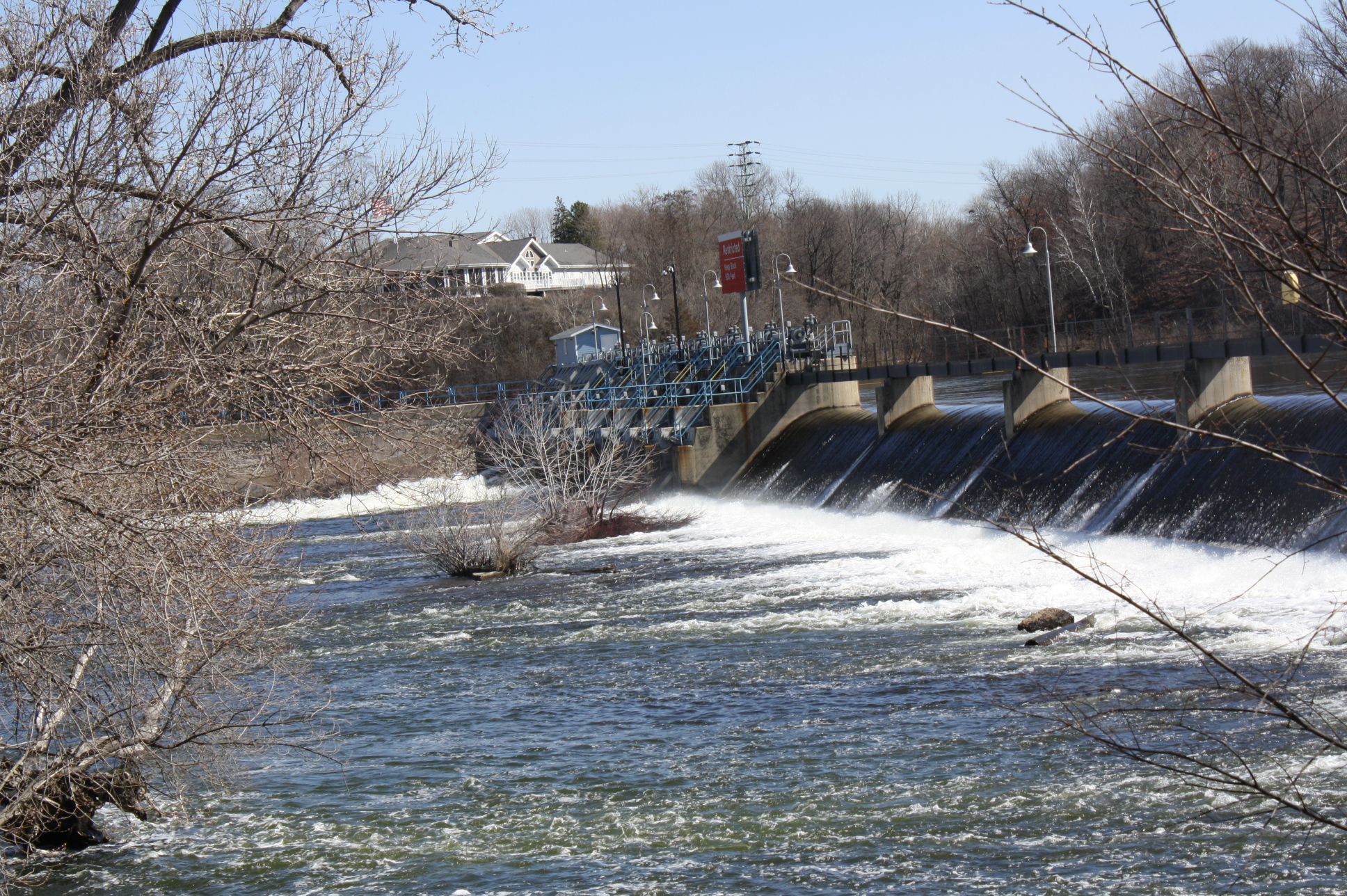
- Lock 1

- Location within Wisconsin Location within the United States
- Location: Appleton, Wisconsin
- NRHP reference No.: 93001333
- Added to NRHP: December 7, 1993

Appleton Locks 1–3 Historic District is a historic district partly in the city of Appleton, Wisconsin. It was added to the National Register of Historic Places for its significance in transport and engineering.

The district includes three locks on the Lower Fox River:

- Appleton Lock 1 in the Lower Fox River Valley, west of Oneida Street in the City of Appleton, at the river's 31.7 mile marker,
- Lock 2 at the 31.5 mile marker in Appleton,
- Lock 3 at the 31.3 mile marker in Appleton.

The latter two are in "Appleton Flats", an industrial area where the Fox River Paper Corporation, the Appleton Machine Company and the Riverside Paper Company are located. Also included are a canal, a dam, three lockshacks, three sheds, two garages and two lockkeepers' houses.
