= Gabe Sapolsky =

American wrestling executive

- Born: Gabriel Sapolsky; September 26, 1972 (age 54); Boston, Massachusetts, U.S.
- Education: Temple University
- Occupation: WWE Creative Consultant
- Years active: 1993–present
- Known for: Booking Ring of Honor; Founding Evolve, Style Battle, and the WWN Supershow; Serving as WWN VP of Talent Relations, Creative & Marketing
- Professional wrestling career
- Ring names: Chris Lovey; Gabe Sapolsky; Jimmy Bower; Matt Pike
- Billed height: 5 ft 8 in (1.73 m)
- Billed weight: 207 lb (94 kg)
- Billed from: Brookline, Massachusetts
- Debut: 1993

Gabriel Sapolsky (born September 26, 1972) is an American professional wrestling promoter and booker. He is currently employed by WWE for whom he oversees WWE ID, a talent identification and development initiative, and serves as a writer for the Evolve and NXT brands.

Sapolsky began his wrestling career in 1993 with Extreme Championship Wrestling (ECW), working under Paul Heyman and contributing to the promotion’s creative and marketing efforts. He later became closely associated with RF Video before co-founding Ring of Honor (ROH) in 2002. As ROH's inaugural booker, he introduced the "Code of Honor" and helped shape the modern American independent wrestling scene, earning four consecutive Best Booker awards from the Wrestling Observer Newsletter.

He went on to launch several influential promotions, including Dragon Gate USA and Evolve Wrestling, and was instrumental in expanding the World Wrestling Network (WWN) brand internationally. His partnership with WWE, beginning in the mid-2010s, facilitated talent exchanges, scouting, and developmental programming, ultimately leading to Evolve airing the first live independent wrestling special on the WWE Network.

== Early life ==
Sapolsky attended Runkle Elementary School and later Brookline High School, graduating in 1990. He earned a Bachelor of Arts degree in communications from Temple University, graduating in 1994.

== Professional wrestling career ==
=== Eastern/Extreme Championship Wrestling and RF Video (1993–2001) ===
Sapolsky began his career in professional wrestling in September 1993 with Extreme Championship Wrestling (ECW), writing the company newsletter The ECW Action Wire. He was hired full-time shortly after graduating from Temple University, around the same time ECW opened its first office in Philadelphia. A protégé of ECW booker Paul Heyman, Sapolsky handled a wide range of responsibilities, including marketing, public relations, and event promotion. He also filmed most ECW events using a handheld camcorder from ringside, known as the "fan cam".

The ECW Action Wire eventually evolved into the official ECW program, which was sold at live events and written, edited, and published by Sapolsky. After ECW ceased operations in early 2001, he became an official employee of RF Video, a distributor of wrestling media closely associated with the promotion.

=== Ring of Honor and Full Impact Pro (2002–2008) ===
Following ECW’s closure, Sapolsky continued working with RF Video and, in 2002, co-founded Ring of Honor (ROH) with RF Video owner Rob Feinstein and associate Doug Gentry. He was appointed the promotion’s booker and developed a distinct style emphasizing sportsmanship—most notably via the "Code of Honor," a set of unwritten rules that guided in-ring conduct.

Sapolsky earned industry recognition for his work in ROH, winning the Wrestling Observer Newsletter’s Best Booker award four consecutive years (2004–2007). He also served as booker for Full Impact Pro (FIP), a Florida-based promotion affiliated with ROH. Under the pseudonyms Jimmy Bower and Matt Pike, he occasionally provided commentary for both promotions.

On October 26, 2008, ROH announced that Sapolsky was no longer with the company. Following his departure, he also ended his involvement with FIP.

=== Dragon Gate USA and Evolve (2009–2014) ===
On April 14, 2009, Sapolsky announced the formation of Dragon Gate USA (DGUSA), where he served as vice president and head booker. The promotion's debut event, Open the Historic Gate, was held on July 25, 2009, at The Arena in Philadelphia, Pennsylvania, and was named Show of the Year by the Wrestling Observer Newsletter. DGUSA operated as the American branch of Japan’s Dragon Gate promotion, regularly featuring top Japanese talent alongside American independent wrestlers.

In early 2010, Sapolsky co-founded Evolve Wrestling with Sal Hamaoui, Chief Operating Officer of World Wrestling Network (WWN). The promotion emphasized American talent and statistical tracking of wins and losses. While DGUSA continued focusing on Japanese stars, Evolve built its identity on showcasing emerging North American talent. DGUSA went on hiatus following its final event in 2014.

=== World Wrestling Network and expansion (2011–2017) ===
Both DGUSA and Evolve became subsidiaries under WWN. In 2011, WWN launched its live internet pay-per-view service, WWNLive.com, where Sapolsky played a key role in marketing and technical development.

In 2013, Sapolsky helped organize the first WrestleCon, an independent wrestling convention and multi-show weekend event. After parting ways with WrestleCon, he and WWN launched The WWN Live Experience, a series of events held annually during WrestleMania week from 2014 to 2019.

In 2014, Sapolsky helped organize a two-week tour of China for WWN—the first such tour by an American independent wrestling promotion. That same year, WWN hosted its first U.S.-based Supershow, featuring talent and title matches from all WWN-affiliated promotions.

In November 2016, WWN entered into a distribution partnership with FloSports to provide content for its new streaming platform, FloSlam. Although Evolve was the primary focus, other WWN brands were also featured. The partnership allowed Sapolsky to co-found Style Battle, a tournament-themed promotion. He also resumed his role as booker for FIP. However, FloSports filed a lawsuit against WWN on September 15, 2017, leading to the dissolution of their partnership.

=== WWE collaboration and Evolve closure (2016–2020) ===
Following the collapse of the FloSports deal, Sapolsky began working more closely with World Wrestling Entertainment (WWE), helping to develop a working relationship between WWE and Evolve. Under this partnership, WWE-contracted talent appeared on Evolve events, and multiple Evolve wrestlers were later signed by WWE.

On July 13, 2019, Evolve became the first independent promotion to air a live special on the WWE Network, celebrating its 10th anniversary. Sapolsky had already begun working with WWE in January 2016 as a creative consultant, primarily for the NXT brand. His responsibilities included talent scouting and developmental planning. Although he had contributed to WWE projects for over a year, his official hiring as a consultant was publicly confirmed on January 10, 2018.

Evolve ceased operations in 2020 due to the COVID-19 pandemic. WWE subsequently purchased all of Evolve's assets, including its tape library and intellectual property.

=== Return to WWE (2022–present) ===
On January 6, 2022, Sapolsky was released from WWE amid organizational restructuring and staffing reductions tied to changes in NXT leadership under Paul Levesque (Triple H). However, on September 23, 2022, it was reported that Sapolsky had re-signed with WWE and joined its creative team once again.

In October 2024, WWE officially announced the launch of WWE ID (Independent Development), a program designed to provide independent wrestlers with a pathway to a potential career in WWE. Sapolsky was appointed to oversee the program.

WWE revived the Evolve brand as a developmental television series titled WWE Evolve. The show premiered on March 5, 2025, airing on Tubi in the United States and on YouTube internationally.

== Other media ==
Sapolsky has been featured in various interviews, podcasts, and documentaries. He appears in the WWE-produced documentaries My Name Is Paul Heyman and Journey to SummerSlam: The Destruction of The Shield, both of which reference his work with former ECW mentor Paul Heyman and former ROH and DGUSA talent such as Dean Ambrose and Seth Rollins.

He is also mentioned in several books by professional wrestlers. Mick Foley referenced Sapolsky in his 2001 autobiography Foley Is Good. Former ROH World Champion Bryan Danielson (Daniel Bryan in WWE) wrote about Sapolsky extensively in his memoir Yes: My Improbable Journey to the Main Event of WrestleMania, stating: “It was the first time anybody had chosen me to be ‘the Man’—the only time, really—and I can’t thank Gabe, ROH, and the ROH fans enough for giving me the opportunity to be the guy to carry the promotion".

Sapolsky was also the focus of an episode of The Wrestlers, a Vice TV documentary series. The episode, titled Best New Talent in America, highlighted his role in developing emerging wrestling talent on the independent circuit.

== Awards and accomplishments ==
- Wrestling Observer Newsletter awards

- Best Booker (2004–2007)
