= Rebecca Onie =

American businesswoman (born 1977)

- Born: 1977 (age 48–49)
- Education: Harvard College, Harvard Law School
- Awards: MacArthur Fellowship
- Scientific career
- Workplaces: The Health Initiative

Rebecca Onie (born 1977) is the co-founder with Rocco J Perla of The Health Initiative, a nationwide effort to spur a new conversation about - and new investments in - health. In 2017, she was elected to the National Academy of Medicine as a nationally recognized leader in the intersection of social determinants, population health, and healthcare delivery. Onie is also the co-founder and Chief Executive Officer Emerita of Health Leads.

== Life ==
In 1996, during her sophomore year at Harvard College, Rebecca Onie founded Health Leads (formerly Project HEALTH) with Dr. Barry Zuckerman, Chair of Pediatrics at Boston Medical Center. As Executive Director of Health Leads, Onie oversaw the organization's growth to Providence and New York City.

After attending Harvard Law School, where she served as an editor of the Harvard Law Review and research assistant for Professors Laurence Tribe and Lani Guinier, Onie clerked for the Honorable Diane P. Wood of the U.S. Court of Appeals for the Seventh Circuit. During this time, Onie served as founding Co-Chair of Health Leads' Board of Directors. She returned to Health Leads as CEO in February 2006.

In 2009, she received a MacArthur Fellowship, for "individuals who have shown extraordinary originality and dedication in their creative pursuits and a marked capacity for self-direction." O! Magazine named her to its 2010 Power List of twenty women who are "changing the world for the better."

In 2012, Onie spoke at TEDMED on the devastating impact of poverty on health. Entitled "Can We Rewrite the DNA of the Healthcare System", her talk focused on Health Leads' role in helping doctors connect their low-income patients with better access to health services, interventions, food and transportation.

Onie is a World Economic Forum Young Global Leader and a U.S. Ashoka Fellow. She received the John F. Kennedy New Frontier Award in 2009, honoring Americans under the age of 40 whose commitment to service is changing their communities and the country; the Jane Rainie Opel ’50 Young Alumna Award in 2008, for outstanding contributions to the advancement of women; and the Do Something Brick Award for Community Leadership in 1999, for dynamic young people under the age of thirty with the passion and drive to improve their communities. Onie was named to Oprah Winfrey's 2010 O Power List of women who are "changing the world for the better." According to O: The Oprah Magazine, Onie and Health Leads "blew us away" by understanding "the power of the big picture."

On July 28, 2011, The New York Times ran a commentary about Health Leads, written by David Bornstein (author), which referred to Health Leads as "one of the most impressive organizations in the country" at addressing the conditions that make people sick.

== Awards ==
- 2017 National Academy of Medicine Membership
- 2015 American Public Health Association Avedis Donabedian Quality Award
- 2015 Aspen Institute Health Innovators Fellowship
- 2014 Innovators in Health Award: Network for Excellence in Health Innovation
- 2013 Schwab Foundation Social Entrepreneur of the Year Award
- 2012 Gleitsman Citizen Activist Award
- 2012 Boston Business Journal's 40 under 40
- 2012 Robert Wood Johnson Foundation Young Leader Award
- 2011 Forbes magazine's list of top social entrepreneurs in the world
- 2011 Skoll Award for Social Entrepreneurship
- 2009 MacArthur Fellows Program
- 2009 John F. Kennedy New Frontier Award
- 2008 U.S. Ashoka Fellow

== Publications ==
- "Integrating Social Needs into Health Care: A Twenty-Year Case Study of Adaptation and Diffusion," by Rebecca Onie, Rocco Perla, Risa Lavizzo-Mourey, Thomas H. Lee and James S. Marks.
- "Population Health: The Ghost Aim," by Rocco Perla, Rebecca Onie and Thomas Lee, MD, MSc
- "Accountable health communities and expanding our definition of health care." Perla, R, Onie R. Health Affairs Blog, March 2, 2016.
- "Realigning Health with Care" by Rebecca Onie, Paul Farmer and Heidi Behforouz, Stanford Social Innovation Review Summer 2012
