= Appleton Lock 4 Historic District =

Historic district in Wisconsin, United States

- U.S. National Register of Historic Places
- U.S. Historic district
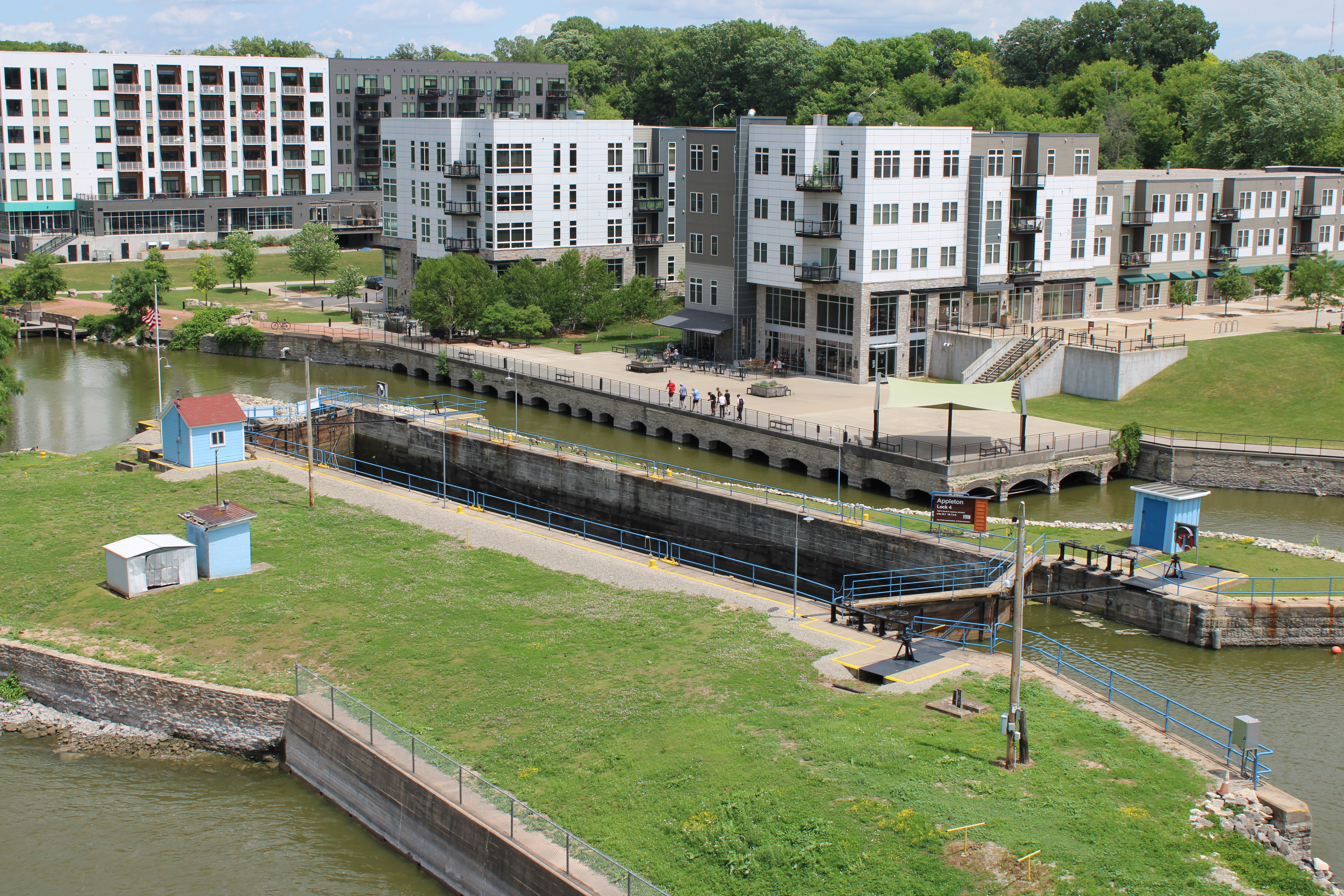
- Lock 4

- Location within Wisconsin Location within the United States
- Location: Fox River at John St. in Appleton, Wisconsin
- NRHP reference No.: 93001329
- Added to NRHP: December 7, 1993

Appleton Lock 4 Historic District is a historic district containing a 1907-built waterway lock in Appleton, Wisconsin. It was added to the National Register of Historic Places in 1993 for its significance in engineering and transport.
