= Bernard A. Widen =

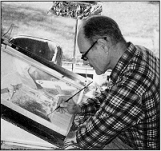
Dr. Bernard A Widen.

Bernard A. Widen (1920–2017) was an American dentist and artist.

== Biography ==
Born in Chicago, Illinois, Bernard Widen spent the years of the Great Depression on Chicago's West Side where his father, Dr. Jacob Widen, was a practicing dentist. Deciding to follow his father's choice of profession, Bernard Widen attended Herzl Junior College and the YMCA College to obtain the prerequisites necessary for entry into the University of Illinois College of Dentistry.

Following graduation in 1944 he served as a captain in the U.S. Army in Germany and Austria, where duty took him to a concentration camp and an encounter with survivors of the Nazi Holocaust. Upon discharge, Widen briefly joined his father in general dentistry on Chicago's North Side before starting his own downtown practice. After 12 years in general dentistry, Widen decided he wanted to shift the focus of his practice to the specialty of orthodontia. He applied to the Loyola University School of Dentistry and in 1960, Widen earned his master's degree. Widen's Masters thesis involved a study using electromyography on facial muscles following the separation of banded teeth and was cited in future thesis papers. Widen opened a new specialty practice on Chicago's North Side, and after only a few years went back to Loyola as a teacher of basic orthodontia to undergraduates.

He had visions of practicing in California, so after his youngest son graduated from high school, Widen sold his Chicago orthodontic practice and moved his family to the Golden State, where he associated with a group dental practice. But after a while, he became disenchanted and in 1986 moved back to Chicago.

== Painting career ==
At age 65, Widen did not want to begin a new practice and decided to retire and try a new hobby. He enrolled in an evening class in drawing at Niles North Monacep program under Mary Pomeranz and completed his very first drawing: a charcoal sketch of a gym shoe that he had removed from his foot. Encouraged, he experimented with colored pencils and acrylic paint. He studied watercolor with Alain Gavin and had his first exhibit at the Lincolnwood library in 1987. In 1988, he learned to use oil paint under Enid Silverman and had his second show at the First Nationwide Bank in Lincolnwood in 1989. He painted at the Palette and Chisel academy, studied portraiture with Richard Halstead, air brush with Len Baer, figurative painting with Walter Moskow and basic art with Jim Krauss. He had his third exhibit in 1990 at the Bank of Lincolnwood. Since then, other exhibits followed at OCC (Des Plaines campus) and the Mayer Kaplan JCC. He loves painting boats, water, people, buildings and whatever has strong character. Photo-realism is his objective in the manner of Mantegna, David and Courbet. The self-taught artist had no formal art school training but continued to pursue his art utilizing various media, such as colored pencils, graphite, acrylics and oils. Widen found his greatest challenge and pleasure in painting with oils, particularly outdoor scenes and portraits. He has copyrighted many of this paintings. Widen's paintings have been exhibited at various art galleries and he participated in many art shows in and around Chicago until the age of 90.

He was commissioned to paint the portrait of the Honorable Howard M. Metzenbaum, United States Senate, 1974, 1977-1994 and the painting is displayed in the Ohio State University, Michael E. Moritz College of Law Library. Warren Buffett has a painting that Widen painted of Mr. Buffet in 2014. Notably, the North Shore Art League chose him to exhibit his art at the Old Orchard Art Fair. He has been published in the book, Artists of Illinois, Volume 1. He was featured on cable TV in the series, 'Artist to Artist' hosted by Ms. Enid Silverman. A 2-page article was written about Widen and he was featured on the Spring 1996 cover of the University of Illinois Alumni Association. Bernard has had numerous articles written in various Lincolnwood papers. His website exhibits some of his many creations.

He and his late wife, Dorothy, had four grown children: one of them a practicing dentist in Chicago, making for three generations of Widen dentists. Besides being a talented artist, Bernard Widen was also an accomplished musician on the electric organ, an avid fisherman and boater, but art remained his main interest until his passing in May, 2017 at home.
