= Zuelke Building =

Neo-gothic high rise building in Appleton, Wisconsin

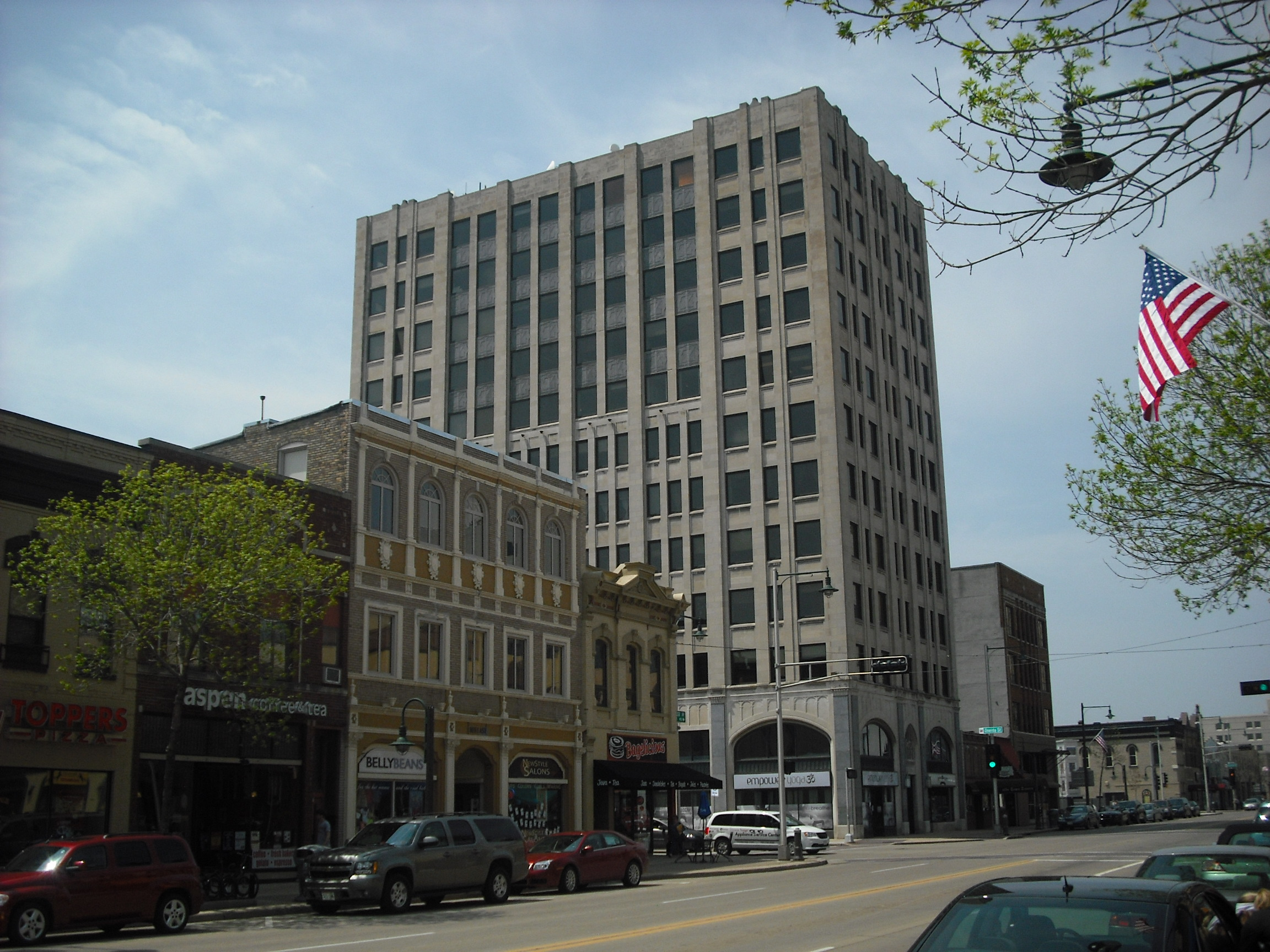
Zuelke Building, Appleton's first skyscraper, completed in 1931

The Zuelke Building is a twelve-story, 168 foot neo-gothic high rise building in Appleton, Wisconsin. It is named for Irving Zuelke. It was completed in 1932, and was added to the National Register of Historic Places in 1982 as part of the College Avenue Historic District. It is located at 103 West College Avenue.
