= Widen Enterprises =

Technology company

Widen
- Founded: 1948
- Founders: Emily Widen; Arthur Widen
- Headquarters: Madison, Wisconsin
- Key people: Matthew Gonnering (CEO)
- Website: www.acquia.com/products/acquia-dam

Widen Enterprises Inc. is a technology company that designs, develops and provides digital asset management and product information management software as well as digital asset management services. The company was founded in 1948 in Madison, Wisconsin by Arthur and Emily Widen, initially as Widen Engraving Co., a plate-engraving business providing printing-plates for newspapers. The company sustained business viability and longevity by adapting its products to technological advances and business model transformation. The company was acquired by Acquia in September 2021 and operates as part of the Acquia Digital Experience platform.

== History ==
=== 1948 – Widen Engraving Co. – Founding and incorporation ===
In 1948, Arthur Widen and Emily Widen, spurred on by his experience working in the Madison newspaper industry and backed by her financial support in the form of a $1,500 mortgage, founded Widen Engraving Co. The business initially helped newspapers create newsprint by engraving creative and marketing materials from photographs and type onto zinc and copper plates.

=== 1960 - 1990 – Widen Colorgraphics Ltd. – Prepress era ===
In 1960, Widen altered their business model by moving beyond the engraving process and began to undertake further prepress activities. The company converted marketing content in the form of photos, illustrations, logos and copy into printed catalogues and advertisements and commenced working with film negatives. A change in its name reflected this transformation, and the company became Widen Colorgraphics Ltd. In 1985, led by Mark Widen, son of founders Arthur and Emily Widen, the company began to focus on colour scanning and printing services.

=== 1990 - 2021 – Widen Enterprises Inc. – Digital asset management ===
With the advancement of prepress technologies and processes, under Reed Widen, son of Mark Widen, the company embraced digital technology, initially through digital printing and created an internal research and development department to innovate and keep abreast of technological developments in the industry.

Matthew Gonnering was appointed as CEO in 2009 and steered the company further towards the software as a service (SaaS) model. Widen Enterprises has since developed its software into a cloud based digital management hub that allows users to readily access and manage their digital assets and product information data. Alongside the software, the company has focused its efforts on customer experience by offering services to aid in the production and implementation of digital assets, as well as training and consultancy on the digital asset management process.

=== 2021 - Present day – Widen, an Acquia Company – Acquia DAM ===
In September 2021, Widen Enterprises was acquired by Acquia, a software-as-a-service company co-founded by Dries Buytaert and Jay Batson to provide enterprise products, services, and technical support for the open-source web content management platform Drupal.

== Investing in new technologies ==
Widen's move away from engraving in the 1960s, was marked by the company's investment in film negatives and photography, such as in the purchase of the first available automated separation camera to embrace the advent of color in the printing industry. In 1985, the company invested $3 million in colour scanners and Scitex equipment, and became the largest Scitex installation in North America.
