= Ethisphere =

Business ethics organization

Ethisphere Institute
- Company type: Private (for-profit)
- Founded: 2007
- Founder: Alex Brigham
- Headquarters: Scottsdale, Arizona
- Website: ethisphere.com

Ethisphere, formerly the Ethisphere Institute is a for-profit company that, for a fee, gives awards to companies for corporate ethics. The company has been criticized for its business model and the possible conflict of interest created when other companies pay for an assessment. Ethisphere assesses companies based on self-reported data and a survey. Companies dubbed "most ethical" by Ethisphere have included companies involved in major public scandals at the time.

== Operations ==
The Executive Chairman of Ethisphere, Alex Brigham, created the institute in 2007, as part of Corpedia, a compliance training company. The company is located in Scottsdale, Arizona. In 2010, Corpedia was sold but Ethisphere's ownership was retained by Brigham.

The company publishes Ethisphere Magazine and announces its World's Most Ethical Companies award once a year. The company also offers verification services for corporate ethics under such names as "Ethics Inside Certification" and "Compliance Leader Verification". It hosts the Global Ethics Summit every March in New York City and manages a community of compliance, ethics and legal professionals known as BELA, the Business Ethics Leadership Alliance.

== Criticism ==
Ethisphere has been criticized for its business model and the possible conflict of interest created when other companies pay for an assessment. Ethisphere assesses companies based on self-reported data and a survey. Companies dubbed "most ethical" by Ethisphere include Eastman Chemical and Blue Shield of California, despite the involvement of both in major public scandals at the time. Ethisphere also awarded Elbit Systems of America, a branch of a large Israeli weapons manufacturer that has been widely protested for its role in the Gaza war, with the title of "one of the World's Most Ethical Companies". Some companies that are recognized often advertise for Ethisphere and pay additional licensing fees for the right to use the year-specific World’s Most Ethical Companies logo.
