= National Register of Historic Places listings in Outagamie County, Wisconsin =

Location of Outagamie County in Wisconsin

This is a list of the National Register of Historic Places listings in Outagamie County, Wisconsin. It is intended to provide a comprehensive listing of entries in the National Register of Historic Places that are located in Outagamie County, Wisconsin. The locations of National Register properties for which the latitude and longitude coordinates are included below may be seen in a map.

There are 52 properties and districts listed on the National Register in the county. Another property was once listed but has been removed.

This National Park Service list is complete through NPS recent listings posted August 28, 2026.

== Current listings ==
	Name on the Register	Image	Date listed	Location	City or town	Description
1	Aid Association for Lutherans (AAL) Building	Aid Association for Lutherans (AAL) Building	November 4, 2024 (#100010969)	222 West College Avenue; 44°15′43″N 88°24′27″W	Appleton	Art Deco-style office tower, built in 1952 for AAL, the world's largest fraternal insurance provider, from a design by Cram and Ferguson Architects of Boston. Their successor firm Hoyle, Doran & Berry designed the 1966 west corner addition. Tallest building in Appleton.
2	Appleton City Park Historic District	Appleton City Park Historic District	October 25, 2002 (#02001213)	Roughly bounded by E. Washington, N. Durkee, E. Atlantic, and Lawe Sts. 44°16′02″N 88°24′00″W	Appleton	Large residential district, mostly built after the city created the park in 1881. Notable properties include the 1867 Gabled-ell Saecker house, the unusual Otto Schlafer house built in 1888 in Queen Anne style and later remodeled as Craftsman, the 1901 Tudor Revival George C. Jones house, the 1904 Queen Anne Weigand house pictured at left, the 1904 Dutch Colonial Revival Marshall house, the 1906 Arts and Crafts Humphrey house, the 1911 Pfeil Bungalow, the 1925 Collegiate Gothic First United Methodist Church and school, and the Neogothic Revival First English Lutheran Church, built in 1931.
3	Appleton Lock 4 Historic District	Appleton Lock 4 Historic District	December 7, 1993 (#93001329)	Fox R. at John St. 44°15′37″N 88°23′20″W	Appleton	Similar to locks 1-3 below, but upgraded later, in 1906-07.
4	Appleton Locks 1-3 Historic District	Appleton Locks 1-3 Historic District	December 7, 1993 (#93001333)	Roughly, along the Fox R. from Memorial Dr. to Lawe St. 44°15′16″N 88°24′12″W	Appleton	Part of the system of locks and dams built starting around 1851 to allow navigation of the Fox River from Green Bay to Portage. Maintained by the Army Corps of Engineers from 1872 to 1984, and used until 1987. Each lock now consists of a masonry chamber, wooden gates, and mechanical apparatus for operating the locks.
5	Appleton Post-Crescent Building	Appleton Post-Crescent Building	October 17, 2019 (#100004524)	306 W. Washington St. 44°15′46″N 88°24′32″W	Appleton	Stylish printing plant with Art Deco exterior, designed by Foeller, Schober & Berners and built in 1932 for a paper with roots going back to 1852.
6	Appleton Wire Works	Appleton Wire Works	September 4, 2008 (#82005123)	600 E. Atlantic St. 44°16′05″N 88°23′54″W	Appleton	Factory built in 1896 by the first wire cloth company in the Midwest. Wire cloth is used by paper mills. The company expanded and in 1938 was the largest weaver of Fourdrinier wire in the world.
7	Appleton Woolen Mills	Appleton Woolen Mills	May 3, 2016 (#16000228)	218 East South Island St. 44°15′23″N 88°24′09″W	Appleton	Mill complex on the Fox River, begun in 1881 as a yarn factory, and expanded to produce mackinaws and flannels in 1888. Expanded to make papermakers' felt in 1890 and continued that until 1969. Once was "the only source of [that felt] east of Ohio."
8	Barteau Bridge	Barteau Bridge	March 28, 2002 (#02000285)	N. of WI 187 crossing of Shioc R. 44°27′56″N 88°34′00″W	Bovina	Large stone arch bridge across the Shioc River with four limestone arches. Designed by John Hayes of Appleton, who designed most of the early stone-arch bridges in the county, and built by James Garvey in 1905-06. Now a pedestrian crossing.
9	Merritt Black House	Merritt Black House	March 29, 1984 (#84003752)	104 River Rd. 44°17′01″N 88°16′40″W	Kaukauna	Queen Anne house with three-story corner tower and exterior of cut stone, built in 1898. Merritt was a farmer, well-driller, realtor, and owned the quarry which produced the stone that covers the house.
10	Norman Brokaw House	Norman Brokaw House	March 29, 1984 (#84003754)	714 Grignon St. 44°16′59″N 88°15′42″W	Kaukauna	Cross-gabled Queen Anne house built around 1884 by Brokaw, who also designed, built and operated paper mills, helped found the Methodist church in Kaukauna, and supported Lawrence University.
11	Cedars Lock and Dam Historic District	Cedars Lock and Dam Historic District	December 7, 1993 (#93001328)	4527 E. Wisconsin Rd. 44°16′46″N 88°19′51″W	Little Chute	Lock, dam and canal to allow navigation of this section of the Fox River. Construction of the lock began in 1850 and it was rebuilt around 1888. Current lock has limestone walls and wooden gates. Nearby is a Dutch Colonial Revival locktender's house built in 1927. The lock is named for the Treaty of the Cedars, which was signed with the Menominee in 1836 on the riverbank nearby.
12	Center Valley Grade School	Center Valley Grade School	April 8, 2011 (#11000162)	W5532 Center Valley Rd. 44°24′09″N 88°28′33″W	Center	One-room schoolhouse built in 1888 by the largely German community - one of seven in the Town of Center at the time. Now restored as a museum.
13	College Avenue Historic District	College Avenue Historic District	December 2, 1982 (#82001848)	215 W. to 109 E., and 110 W. to 102 E. College Ave.; 106-114n. Onida St. 44°15′42″N 88°24′21″W	Appleton	Commercial district with 27 contributing properties, including William Waters' 1859 First National Bank, the 1880 Italianate Kresge Building, the 1881 Second Empire Prince Cigar Store, the 1885 High Victorian Gothic Kamps' Harness Shop, the 1897 Queen Anne Myse Sample House, the 1922 Chicago Commercial Brettschneider Furniture building, the 1931 Art Deco Gibson Auto Exchange, and the 1932 Neogothic Revival Zuelke Building.
14	J. B. Courtney Woolen Mills	J. B. Courtney Woolen Mills	July 15, 1993 (#93000650)	301 E. Water St. 44°15′35″N 88°24′10″W	Appleton	Wool-carding mill powered by the Fox River, built in 1927 to replace a wool mill which had been on the site since 1880. Still in operation.
15	Eagle Paper and Flouring Mill	Eagle Paper and Flouring Mill	February 12, 2015 (#15000021)	600 Thilmany Rd. 44°16′51″N 88°15′21″W	Kaukauna	First paper mill in Kaukauna, initially making paper in 1872 from farmers' straw and cloth rags using hydro power from the Fox. Soon after under Henry Frambach was the first mill in the state to make paper from wood pulp. Began as a flour mill. Photo is not the historic mill.
16	Fargo's Furniture Store	Fargo's Furniture Store	March 29, 1984 (#84003755)	172-176 W. Wisconsin Ave. 44°16′57″N 88°16′07″W	Kaukauna	Neoclassical store built in 1928, originally with Bert Fargo's furniture showroom downstairs and undertaker business upstairs. His father George had begun the family business in Kaukauna in 1881, describing his enterprise in 1890 as "an undertaking business, repairing, picture framing, large stock of wallpaper, and furniture."
17	Fox River Paper Company Historic District	Fox River Paper Company Historic District	April 19, 1990 (#90000639)	405-406, 415 S. Olde Oneida St. 44°15′31″N 88°24′18″W	Appleton	Complex of paper mill buildings, including the Romanesque-styled Ravine/Rag Mills, the Italianate-styled Lincoln Mill which originally milled flour, and the Italianate-styled Fox River Mill.
18	Free Public Library of Kaukauna	Free Public Library of Kaukauna	March 29, 1984 (#84003756)	111 Main Ave. 44°16′47″N 88°16′14″W	Kaukauna	Carnegie library designed by Claude and Starck in Prairie School/Craftsman style and built in 1906 on an island in the Fox River.
19	William and Susanna Geenen House	William and Susanna Geenen House	February 25, 1993 (#93000070)	416 N. Sidney St. 44°16′36″N 88°20′11″W	Kimberly	2.5 story American Foursquare house with Craftsman detailing and a porte cochere, designed by Herman Wildhagen of Appleton and built in 1921. William started a milk delivery business, ran a greenhouse adjacent to this house, served as clerk for the Kimberley School District many years, and served as vice-president of the State Bank of Little Chute for 34 years.
20	Greenville State Bank	Greenville State Bank	September 23, 1982 (#82000691)	N1843 Municipal Dr. 44°18′26″N 88°32′13″W	Greenville	Small brick commercial bank built in 1919. Street renumbered from 252 Municipal Dr.
21	Charles A. Grignon House	Charles A. Grignon House	October 18, 1972 (#72000064)	Augustine St. 44°17′08″N 88°15′21″W	Kaukauna	2.5 story Federal-style house built in 1836, once known as "the Mansion in the Woods." Served as inn, church, trading post, and Indian meeting place. Grignon's French-Canadian family had run a trading post at Kaukauna since at least 1760. Charles continued the fur trade and was U.S. interpreter at all treaties with the Menominee from 1830 to 1862. Now a museum.
22	Hearthstone	Hearthstone	December 2, 1974 (#74000112)	625 W. Prospect Ave. 44°15′16″N 88°24′54″W	Appleton	1881 home with nine fireplaces designed by William Waters in Queen Anne style for Henry Rogers, who ran the Appleton Paper and Pulp Company. In 1882 it became the first private home in the nation lit with electricity from an Edison central hydroelectric power station, which was located at the paper mill's plant on the river below.
23	Holy Cross Church	Holy Cross Church	March 29, 1984 (#84003758)	309 Desnoyer St. 44°17′03″N 88°16′08″W	Kaukauna	Neogothic/Romanesque church built in 1916. Holy Cross is the original Roman Catholic parish in Kaukauna, with a previous church building on the site built in 1873 and the Grignons included among its early members.
24	Hortonville Community Hall	Hortonville Community Hall	January 23, 1981 (#81000053)	312 W. Main St. 44°20′07″N 88°38′28″W	Hortonville	Meeting hall/dance hall/opera house designed by Robert Messmer in Spanish Colonial style and built in 1912.
25	Kaukauna Locks Historic District	Kaukauna Locks Historic District	December 7, 1993 (#93001327)	Roughly, along the Fox R. running E past Canal St. 44°16′59″N 88°15′38″W	Kaukauna	Part of the Fox–Wisconsin Waterway: five locks with hand-operated wooden gates, a guard lock, a dam, canal, boathouse, drydock, lock-keeper's house, and various sheds. All help vessels around a 50-foot rapids in the Fox River. Constructed in the 1850s by private companies. Largely rebuilt in the 1880s by the Army Corps of Engineers.
26	Klein Dairy Farmhouse	Klein Dairy Farmhouse	March 29, 1984 (#84003760)	1018 Sullivan Ave. 44°16′16″N 88°16′41″W	Kaukauna	The 1892 Queen Anne-styled house with square corner turret is a remnant of a large dairy farm. The Kleins immigrated from Germany in 1842 and over the years farmed, ran a flour and feed mill, and sold milk to households from a horse-drawn cart.
27	Joseph Kronser Hotel and Saloon	Joseph Kronser Hotel and Saloon	July 28, 1988 (#88001153)	N1865 Municipal Dr. 44°18′29″N 88°32′13″W	Greenville	1897 hotel built with 5 bedrooms to serve travelers on the railroad. Also housed railroad ticket office, barber shop, bus stop, funeral parlor, and served as community meeting place. Street renumbered from 246 Municipal Dr.
28	Kuehn Blacksmith Shop-Hardware Store	Kuehn Blacksmith Shop-Hardware Store	March 29, 1984 (#84003761)	148-152 E. 2nd St. 44°16′40″N 88°16′15″W	Kaukauna	Brick Romanesque Revival store built in 1891 around two earlier buildings by Julius Kuehn, blacksmith and later mayor. By 1911, Fred Merbach owned the building, advertising general hardware, furniture, and undertaking services.
29	Lindauer and Rupert Block	Lindauer and Rupert Block	March 29, 1984 (#84003763)	137-141 E. 2nd St. 44°16′40″N 88°16′17″W	Kaukauna	3-story Romanesque Revival commercial building built in 1895, during the railroad boom. After Luther Lindauer lost a hand in a planing mill accident, he drove horses, worked on the canal, ran a quarry, an ice business, a fuel business, a brickyard, and served as mayor of Kaukauna for 3 terms. His building later housed the Elks Club for many years.
30	Little Chute Locks and Canal Historic District	Little Chute Locks and Canal Historic District	December 7, 1993 (#93001325)	Roughly, along the Fox R. from Mill St. to Sanitorium Rd. 44°16′32″N 88°18′31″W	Little Chute	Navigation canal with locks, fed by a 561-foot concrete dam, and supported by other miscellaneous structures. Initially built around 1850 and upgraded at various times since. Part of the Fox–Wisconsin Waterway.
31	Main Hall, Lawrence University	Main Hall, Lawrence University	January 18, 1974 (#74000113)	400-500 E. College Ave. 44°15′39″N 88°23′58″W	Appleton	Large 4-story Georgian-styled limestone-clad building at Lawrence University, built around 1854. Housed men's dormitory, classrooms, offices, library and chapel.
32	Julius J. Martens Company Building	Julius J. Martens Company Building	March 29, 1984 (#84003764)	124-128 E. 3rd St. 44°16′38″N 88°16′20″W	Kaukauna	Italianate-styled store built in 1901, with retail space on first floor and elegant apartments on the second. Martens originally sold dry goods, groceries and crockery downstairs. He also served various civic roles, in other businesses, and organized Kaukauna's first successful farmers' market.
33	Masonic Temple	Masonic Temple	September 12, 1985 (#85002330)	330 E. College Ave. 44°15′44″N 88°24′05″W	Appleton	Built by the local Masonic Blue Lodge in 1923, in Neo-Norman style. Now The History Museum at the Castle / Harry Houdini museum.
34	Capt. Matthew J. Meade House	Capt. Matthew J. Meade House	March 29, 1984 (#84003765)	309 Division St. 44°16′59″N 88°15′47″W	Kaukauna	1884 Italianate villa with a 3-story square tower. Meade led a company of Wisconsin volunteers which marched with Sherman through Georgia. He invested in land in the Fox valley, developed a power canal along the river in front of this house, and served in the State Senate.
35	Nicolet Public School	Nicolet Public School	March 29, 1984 (#84003767)	109 E. 8th St. 44°16′24″N 88°16′28″W	Kaukauna	Designed by local architect Phillip Deane in Romanesque Revival style and built in 1891, the school was named for Jean Nicolet, who probably visited Kaukauna in 1634.
36	Osprey Site	Osprey Site	January 21, 1998 (#97001644)	Address Restricted	Kaukauna	
37	George Peters House	George Peters House	June 18, 1987 (#87000989)	305 N. Maple St. 44°28′37″N 88°26′59″W	Black Creek	1.5 story brick home built in 1909, combining Bungalow and Colonial Revival styles.
38	Rapide Croche Lock and Dam Historic District	Rapide Croche Lock and Dam Historic District	December 7, 1993 (#93001326)	Fox R. at the Outagamie-Brown County line 44°19′00″N 88°11′42″W	Wrightstown	One hand-operated lock, a 461-foot concrete dam, and 1907 Colonial Revival lock-keeper's house. Part of the Fox–Wisconsin Waterway, initially built in the 1850s.
39	Henry Schuetter House	Henry Schuetter House	July 5, 1996 (#96000725)	330 W. 6th St. 44°15′30″N 88°24′35″W	Appleton	2.5-story Queen Anne house built in 1890. Schuetter ran a local tailoring business.
40	Frank St. Andrews House	Frank St. Andrews House	March 29, 1984 (#84003768)	320 Dixon St. 44°16′33″N 88°16′14″W	Kaukauna	1911 stucco-clad bungalow with leaded stained glass windows and oak-trimmed interior, largely intact. One of the best examples of a bungalow in Kaukauna.
41	St. Mary's Catholic Church	St. Mary's Catholic Church	March 29, 1984 (#84003769)	119 W. 7th St. 44°16′27″N 88°16′34″W	Kaukauna	Neogothic Revival church with cruciform floor plan, designed by Adolphus Druiding and built in 1898 with European influences for the largely German and Irish congregation which grew during south Kaukauna's (Ledyard's) boom in rail and water power.
42	St. Paul Evangelical Lutheran Church	St. Paul Evangelical Lutheran Church	April 11, 2008 (#08000287)	302 N. Morrison St. 44°15′52″N 88°24′13″W	Appleton	Large Neogothic-styled church built by Lutherans in 1907. Now part of WELS.
43	South Greenville Grange No. 225	South Greenville Grange No. 225	May 11, 2018 (#100002443)	W6920 Cty. Rd. BB; 44°14′38″N 88°32′18″W	Greenville	Meeting hall of the local chapter of the Grange, a national farmers' organization. The 2-story brick building also served as a general community center.
44	Charles W. Stribley House	Charles W. Stribley House	March 29, 1984 (#84003770)	705 W. Wisconsin Ave. 44°17′04″N 88°16′37″W	Kaukauna	Elegant 3-story Tudor Revival house facing the Fox River, designed by Van Ryn & DeGelleke and built in 1910. It has a red tile roof, stained glass windows, marble thresholds, and a 175-year-old hand-carved fireplace, yet also an early central vacuum system and telephone intercom. Stribley rose from bookkeeper to director at Thilmany Pulp and Paper Co. and was a key founder of the Outagamie County Teachers' College.
45	Temple Zion and School	Temple Zion and School	September 18, 1978 (#78000123)	320 N. Durkee St. and 309 E. Harris St. 44°15′53″N 88°24′07″W	Appleton	Stick-style synagogue built by the local Jewish community in 1883, one of the earliest in Wisconsin. A young Edna Ferber worshiped there, and Harry Houdini's father was rabbi of the congregation just before moving to this building, but was dismissed because he preached only in German. Now houses Wahl Organbuilders.
46	Thern Farmstead		January 11, 2024 (#100009774)	425 East Fairview Drive; 44°24′13″N 88°43′57″W	New London	This farm was the site of the New London City Fair in the late 1800s. It was later sold to the George Thern family who mostly farmed dairy and honey. Now an intact example of an early 20th century farm, with an 1891 gabled-ell house and wood frame outbuildings.
47	James Tompkins House	James Tompkins House	April 3, 1986 (#86000623)	523 S. State St. 44°15′27″N 88°24′49″W	Appleton	1868 Italianate home with "grout block" exterior. James was a pioneer farmer in Greenville from 1848, then moved to Appleton in 1865 and founded the Empire Soap Company.
48	US Post Office, Former	US Post Office, Former	January 22, 1992 (#91001990)	112 Main Ave. 44°16′44″N 88°16′13″W	Kaukauna	Brick post office built in Neoclassical style around 1936.
49	Washington School	Washington School	June 7, 1984 (#84003772)	818 W. Lorain St. 44°16′02″N 88°25′06″W	Appleton	Large red-brick hip roof school built in 1895 in Richardsonian Romanesque style.
50	West Prospect Avenue Historic District	West Prospect Avenue Historic District	August 15, 2001 (#01000900)	315-330 West Prospect Ave. 44°15′35″N 88°24′36″W	Appleton	Residential district with 8 homes, including the 1873 Mediterranean Revival Goff house, the 1902 Shingle style Bertchy house, the 1903 Colonial Revival Wolf house, the 1910 Prairie style Plank house, and the 1927 Tudor Revival Schommer house.
51	John Hart Whorton House	John Hart Whorton House	November 19, 1974 (#74000114)	315 W. Prospect Ave. 44°15′29″N 88°24′32″W	Appleton	Victorian brick house with 3-story corner tower designed in Italianate style by William Waters and built in 1870. Whorton owned lumber mills and was a bank president.
52	Zion Lutheran Church	Zion Lutheran Church	June 13, 1986 (#86001309)	912 N. Oneida St. 44°16′12″N 88°24′19″W	Appleton	Large Gothic-Revival-style church built by Lutherans in 1902. Its last German-language service was in 1957. Now part of the ELCA.

== Former listings ==
	Name on the Register	Image	Date listed	Date removed	Location	City or town	Description
1	Volksfreund Building		December 27, 1974 (#74002336)	April 24, 1984	200 E. College Ave.	Appleton	High Victorian Italianate commercial building with an elaborate corner tower, built in 1891 to house an independent German newspaper. A.k.a. W. A. Close Store. Damaged by fire in 1981 and demolished.

== See also ==
- List of National Historic Landmarks in Wisconsin
- National Register of Historic Places listings in Wisconsin
- Listings in neighboring counties: Brown, Calumet, Shawano, Waupaca, Winnebago
