= Elizabeth Dayton =

American poet and author

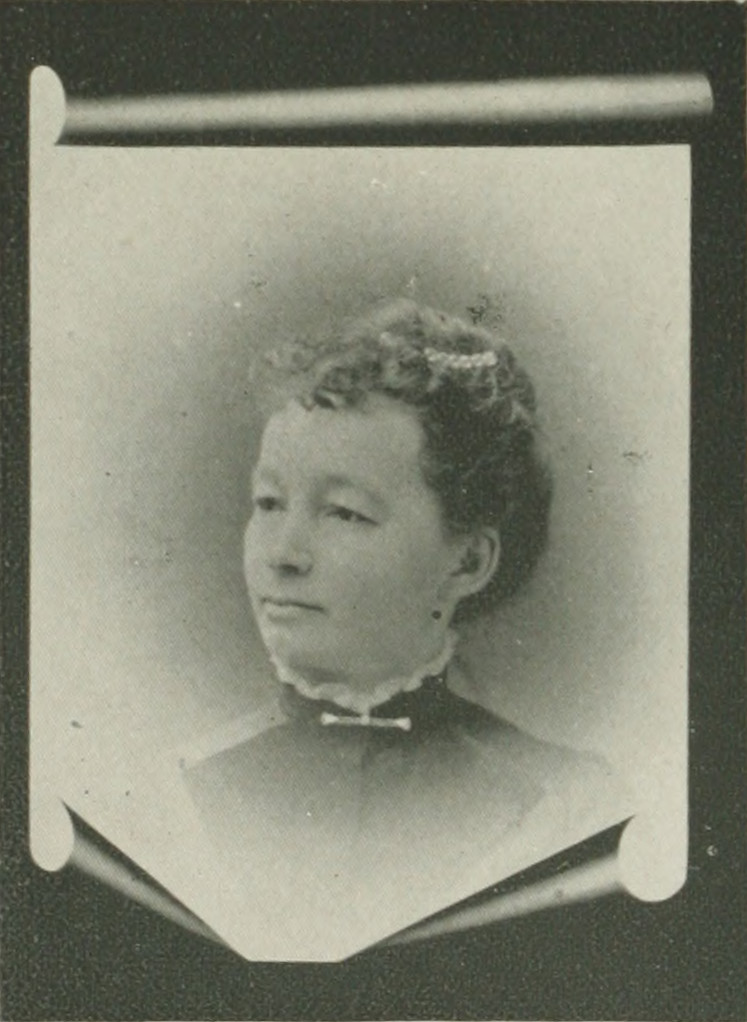
- Born: December 25, 1848; Chertsey
- Died: November 10, 1924 (aged 75); Kaukauna

Elizabeth Dayton (25 December 1848 – 10 November 1924) was a British-born American poet and author who published under the name Beth Day.

Elizabeth Dayton was born on 25 December 1848 in Chertsey, England, the daughter of Richard Dawson and Mary Smith Dawson. The family moved to Wisconsin in the United States in 1850, eventually settling in Kaukauna, where Elizabeth Dayton spent most of her life.

Dayton wrote stories for children and poems. She contributed to publications including Youth's Companion, Chicago Inter-Ocean, Godey's Lady's Book, Demorest's Magazine, the Weekly Wisconsin, Home Magazine, Young Idea, and Our Continent. She also worked as a reporter for the Kaukauna Sun.

Dayton was active in civic affairs and instrumental in the building of a Carnegie library for the Free Public Library of Kaukauna.

Elizabeth Dayton died on 10 November 1924 in Kaukauna.

== Bibliography ==
- The Story of Johnikin. American Baptist Publication Society, 1898.
- Anemonies and Clover, Poems. Whitney Publishing Co., n.d. (1894?)
