= Champ Seibold =

American football player (1911–1971)

No. 37, 41, 57, 58
- Position: Guard/Tackle

Personal information
- Born: December 5, 1911; Oshkosh, Wisconsin, U.S.
- Died: November 2, 1971 (aged 59); Oshkosh, Wisconsin, U.S.
- Listed height: 6 ft 4 in (1.93 m)
- Listed weight: 240 lb (109 kg)

Career information
- High school: Oshkosh (Wisconsin)
- College: Wisconsin

Career history
- Green Bay Packers (1934–1940); Chicago Cardinals (1942)

Awards and highlights
- NFL champion (1936)

Career statistics
- Games played: 59
- Games started: 22
- Stats at Pro Football Reference

Champ C. Seibold (December 5, 1911 – November 2, 1971) was an American professional football player who was an offensive lineman for seven seasons for the Chicago Cardinals and Green Bay Packers.

Seibold died on November 2, 1971, at the age of 59.

== Early life and education ==
Seibold was born on December 5, 1911, in Oshkosh, Wisconsin to Otto and Theresa Seibold, one of four siblings. He grew up in Oshkosh and attended Oshkosh West High School there. He played football for the high school team, his summer job was working with cement along with the team captain, Hugo Jannush. He was a candidate in the 1928 student council officer elections, he won as a sophomore. On March 8, 1929, he, along with other students of his school met film star Lon Chaney in a Hotel Northland lobby before a winning game in Green Bay. He shook Seibold's hand and gave him an autograph. Seibold along with the others students attempted to persuade him to watch their game, but Chaney said he could not go even though he wanted to, as he had a conference scheduled that same day. He also played basketball for the school and won the 1934 state amateur basketball tournament with them, after beating the Kenosha Three Aces in the finals, 33 to 36.

In 1931, after high school, Seibold started attending Ripon College, and played football for them. After becoming $92 in debt, he moved to University of Wisconsin, where he was ineligible for some sports due to his debts.

== Professional career ==
He played for the Green Bay Packers.

== Later life and death ==
Seibold was married to on March 19, 1942 to Mary L. Koenig; they had three children, a son, Greg C. and two daughters, Lynn Hoeft and Lani Dordel. He operated an eponymous bar in Oshkosh known as Champ's Bar from 1937 to 1956. Afterwards, he was employed by the Division of Corrections at Kettle Moraine Boys School in Plymouth. He died on November 2, 1971 of a heart attack, at 2 a.m. aged 59. His private funeral was held two days later at 9 a.m. on November 4 at Konrad Funeral Home. It was officiated by Reverend William Ricker, St. Mary Catholic Church's pastor.
