= Thilmany Papers =

American paper manufacturer

- Type: Division
- Founded: 1883; 143 years ago
- Founder: Oscar Thilmany
- Parent: Ahlstrom Munksjö

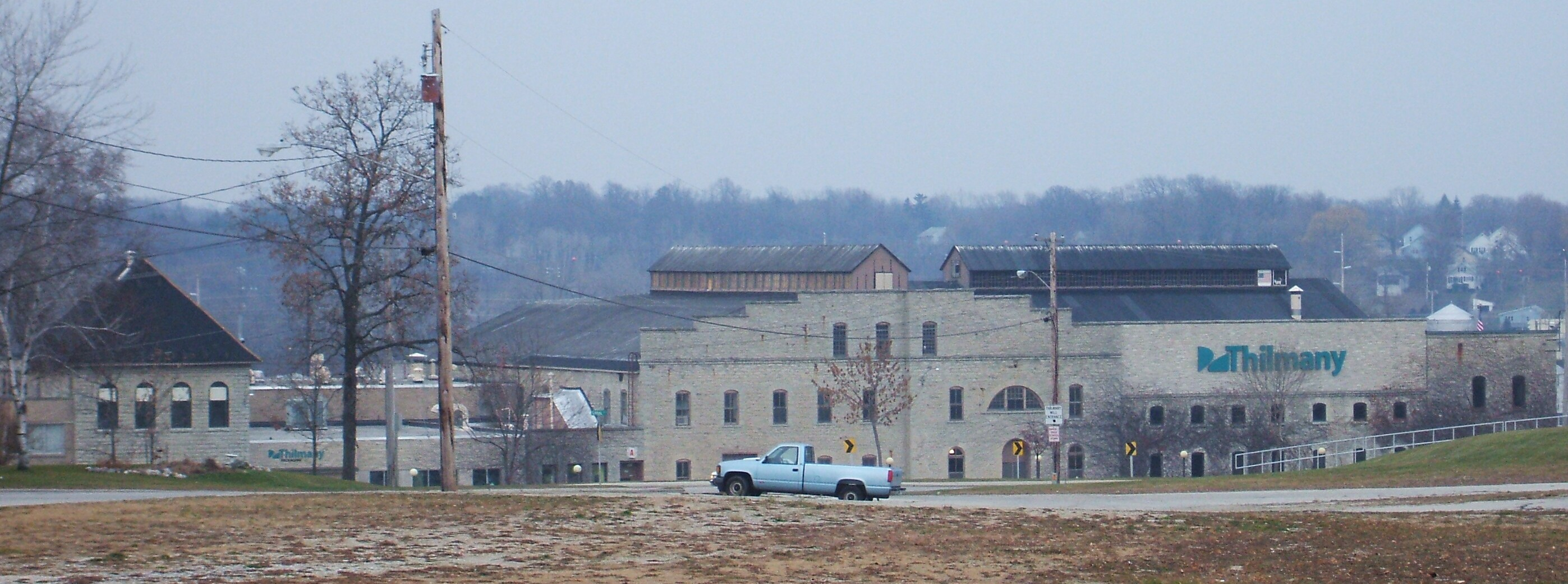
The Thilmany plant offices in Kaukauna

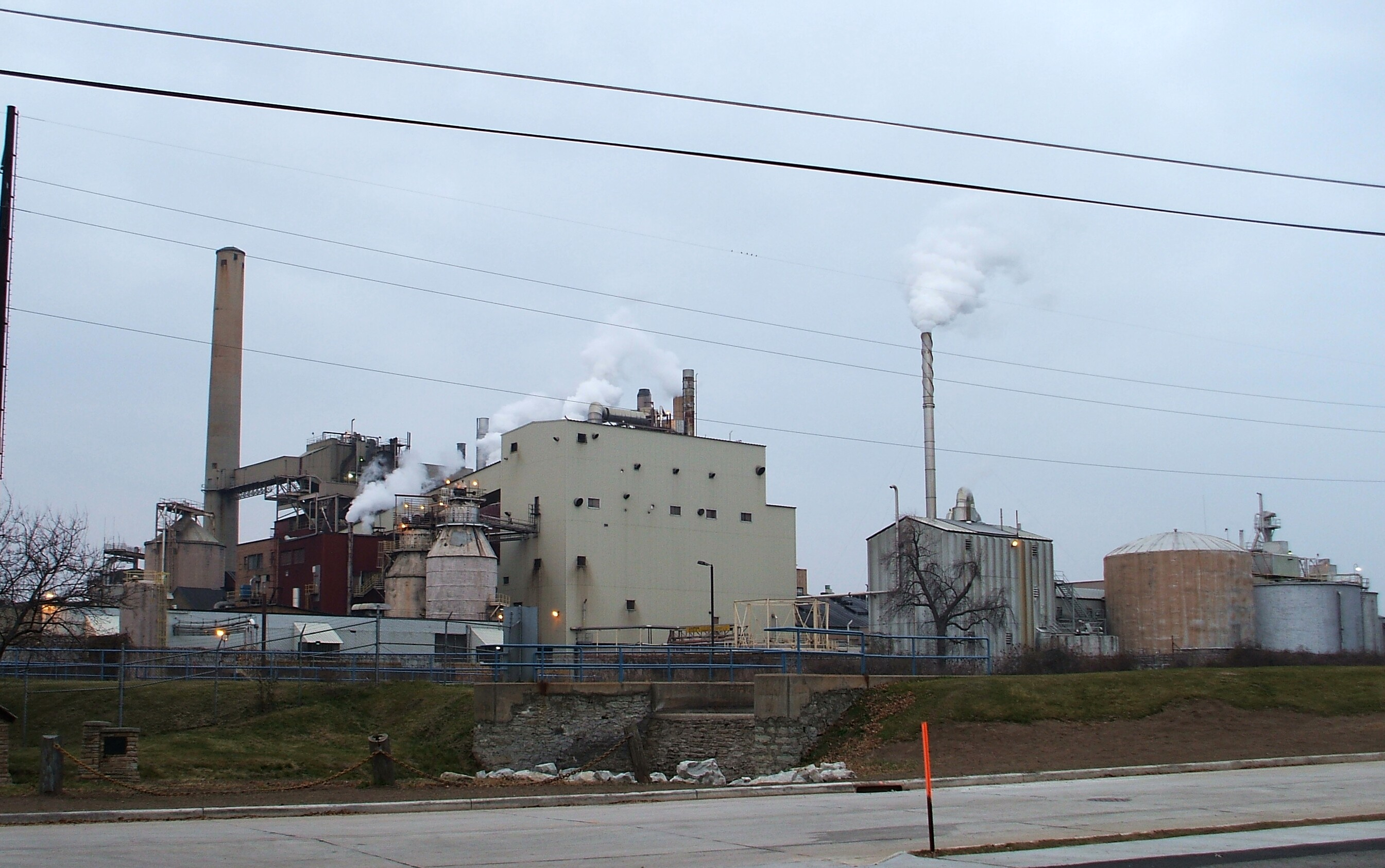
The Thilmany factory in Kaukauna as seen from the Grignon home.

The Thilmany factory in Kaukauna as seen from the 1000 Islands Environmental Center.

Thilmany Papers was a manufacturer of specialty lightweight packaging, pressure-sensitive, and technical and industrial papers. Thilmany Papers paper mill operations were located on former Menominee territory in Kaukauna and De Pere, Wisconsin. The area was ceded to the United States in the 1836 Treaty of the Cedars, in which the Menominee nation transferred approximately four million acres of land in present-day northeastern Wisconsin. Thilmany Papers is now a part of Ahlstrom Munksjö, which also owns paper mills in Rhinelander, Wisconsin, De Pere, Wisconsin, and Mosinee, Wisconsin.

Oscar Thilmany (the company's namesake) opened the Kaukauna mill in 1883. The company's current plant is the source of the aroma most associated with Kaukauna.

== History ==
=== Indigenous territory ===
The land on which Thilmany Papers operates lies within the ancestral homeland of the Menominee people, who have inhabited the Fox River Valley for at least 10,000 years. The Menominee called themselves Mamaceqtaw ("the people") and Kiash Matchitiwuk ("Ancient Ones"), and their oral history states they have always lived in this region.

In the 1836 Treaty of the Cedars, the Menominee nation ceded approximately four million acres of land—including present-day Kaukauna—to the United States government for $700,000, or roughly 17 cents per acre. The treaty was negotiated by Wisconsin Territorial Governor Henry Dodge, a slaveholder and veteran of wars against the Ho-Chunk and Sauk, and signed by Menominee Chief Oshkosh. The treaty opened the Fox River Valley to logging and white settlement, and the Menominee began relocating west of the Wolf River after the treaty was proclaimed in February 1837.

=== Founding and early years ===
Oscar Thilmany was born in Bitburg, Germany in 1844. He emigrated to the United States in 1866, settling first in New York City where he worked for a German-language newspaper. After relocating to Cleveland, Ohio to work in the wood-preserving industry, Thilmany moved to Milwaukee, Wisconsin in 1875.

In Milwaukee, Thilmany became acquainted with bankers Jacob and Robert Nunnemacher, who were acquiring land along the Fox River. On September 18, 1883—forty-seven years after the Treaty of the Cedars—Thilmany and five partners founded the American Pulp Company on the river in Kaukauna. The mill opened with a daily capacity of one ton and employed eighteen people: ten men and eight women.

Thilmany bought out his Milwaukee partners in 1889 and renamed the company Thilmany Pulp and Paper Company, purchasing the mill's first newsprint machine. The company became known for producing specialty papers for urban newspapers in Milwaukee and Chicago.

During the recession of 1893–1894, Thilmany temporarily suspended production and cut employee wages by eight to ten percent. By 1895, the company recovered by securing contracts to produce fruit wrappers for California businesses, establishing a partnership with Monroe A. Wertheimer.

In 1901, Thilmany sold his ownership stake, and in 1902 he departed the company entirely. He returned to Germany, where he built a mansion on the Rhine and lived until his death in 1922.

=== Wertheimer era and labor relations ===
Monroe A. Wertheimer became president of Thilmany in 1902 and led the company for 34 years. Under his leadership, Thilmany became Kaukauna's first million-dollar company by 1913.

Wertheimer was known for keeping labor unions out of the mill by offering wages and benefits designed to preempt organization. Labor leader John Burke, president of the International Brotherhood of Pulp, Sulphite, and Paper Mill Workers, referred to Thilmany as a "scab mill." Wertheimer was explicit about his strategy, and when employees walked out in 1922 protesting a four-cent-per-hour wage reduction, he convinced both workers and local union officials to accept the cut by arguing the company's survival was at stake.

During this period, Thilmany built company housing known as "White City" for employees, employed a full-time nurse, opened a company library, and encouraged employees to form non-union associations.

=== Great Depression and World War II ===
Thilmany recorded record sales in 1929, but by mid-1930, sales were plummeting. The company consolidated operations by closing its Wisconsin Tissue Mill in Appleton and relocating equipment and workers to Kaukauna.

In 1931, despite declining revenues, Wertheimer ordered construction of a new bag-producing plant. The city of Kaukauna financed the $40,000 construction cost with an interest-free loan payable over ten years. In 1935, Thilmany signed its first legally binding contracts with the Paper Makers and Pulp, Sulphite, and Paper Mill Workers unions.

Wertheimer retired in 1936. During World War II, Thilmany secured government contracts to produce waterproof wax papers for military use. By the 1950s, the company had become the largest strictly specialty paper mill in the country and the only remaining paper mill in Kaukauna.

=== Corporate ownership ===
In 1969, Thilmany merged with Hammermill Papers. Hammermill was acquired by International Paper in 1986. In 2005, the mill was purchased by New York-based Kohlberg & Company. In 2018, the mill was sold to Finnish company Ahlstrom Munksjö.
