= Arnold C. Otto =

American politician

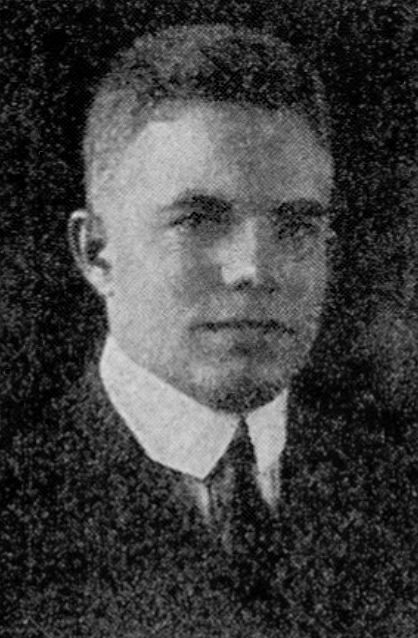

Member of the Wisconsin State Assembly
- In office 1917, 1919

Personal details
- Born: July 27, 1887 Kaukauna, Wisconsin, US
- Died: March 17, 1965 (aged 77) Palm Beach, Florida, US
- Party: Republican
- Spouse: Madeline Bird (m. 1935)
- Education: Lawrence College; George Washington University Law School

Arnold C. Otto (1887–1965) was a member of the Wisconsin State Assembly.

== Biography ==
Otto was born in Kaukauna, Wisconsin on July 27, 1887. He would graduate from Kaukauna High School, as well as from what was then Lawrence College and the George Washington University Law School. Otto served as an officer in the District of Columbia National Guard and assisted in organizing the Legal Aid Society of Milwaukee. On June 25, 1935, he married Madeline Bird. He died in Palm Beach, Florida on March 17, 1965.

== Electoral career ==
Otto was elected to the Assembly in 1916 and 1918. He was a Republican.
