= Klein Dairy Farmhouse =

Historic house in Wisconsin, United States

- The Klein Dairy Farmhouse
- U.S. National Register of Historic Places
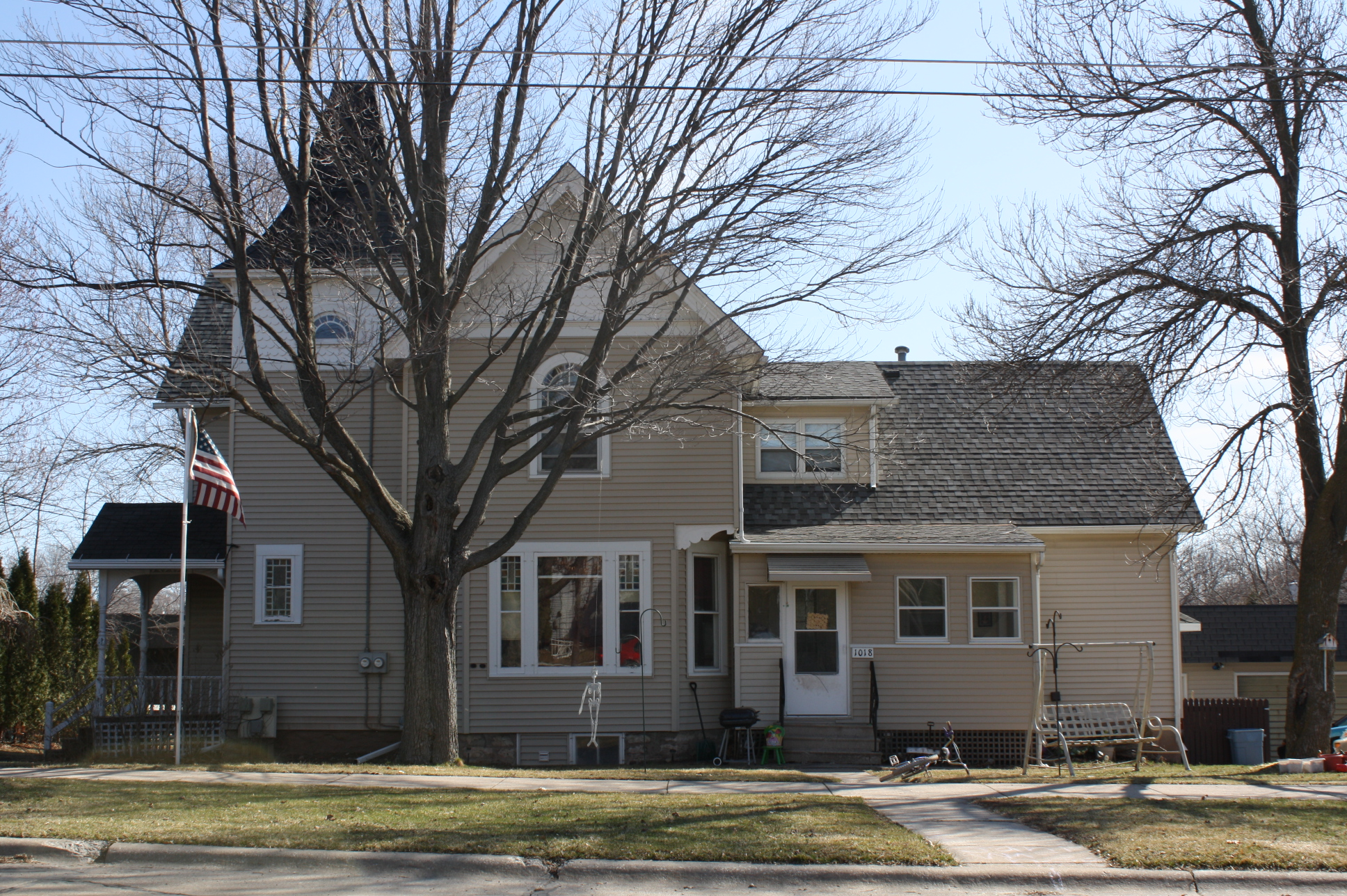

- Location within Wisconsin Location within the United States
- Location: 1018 Sullivan Ave. Kaukauna, Wisconsin
- Coordinates: 44°16′15″N 88°16′41″W
- Area: less than one acre
- Built: 1892
- Architectural style: Queen Anne
- NRHP reference No.: 84003760
- Added to NRHP: March 29, 1984

The Klein Dairy Farmhouse is a historic house located in Kaukauna, Wisconsin. It is locally significant as one of the best local examples of the popular Queen Anne style and as the surviving farmhouse of the first dairy in Kaukauna.

== Description and history ==
It was added to the National Register of Historic Places on March 29, 1984.
