= Lindauer and Rupert Block =

- U.S. National Register of Historic Places
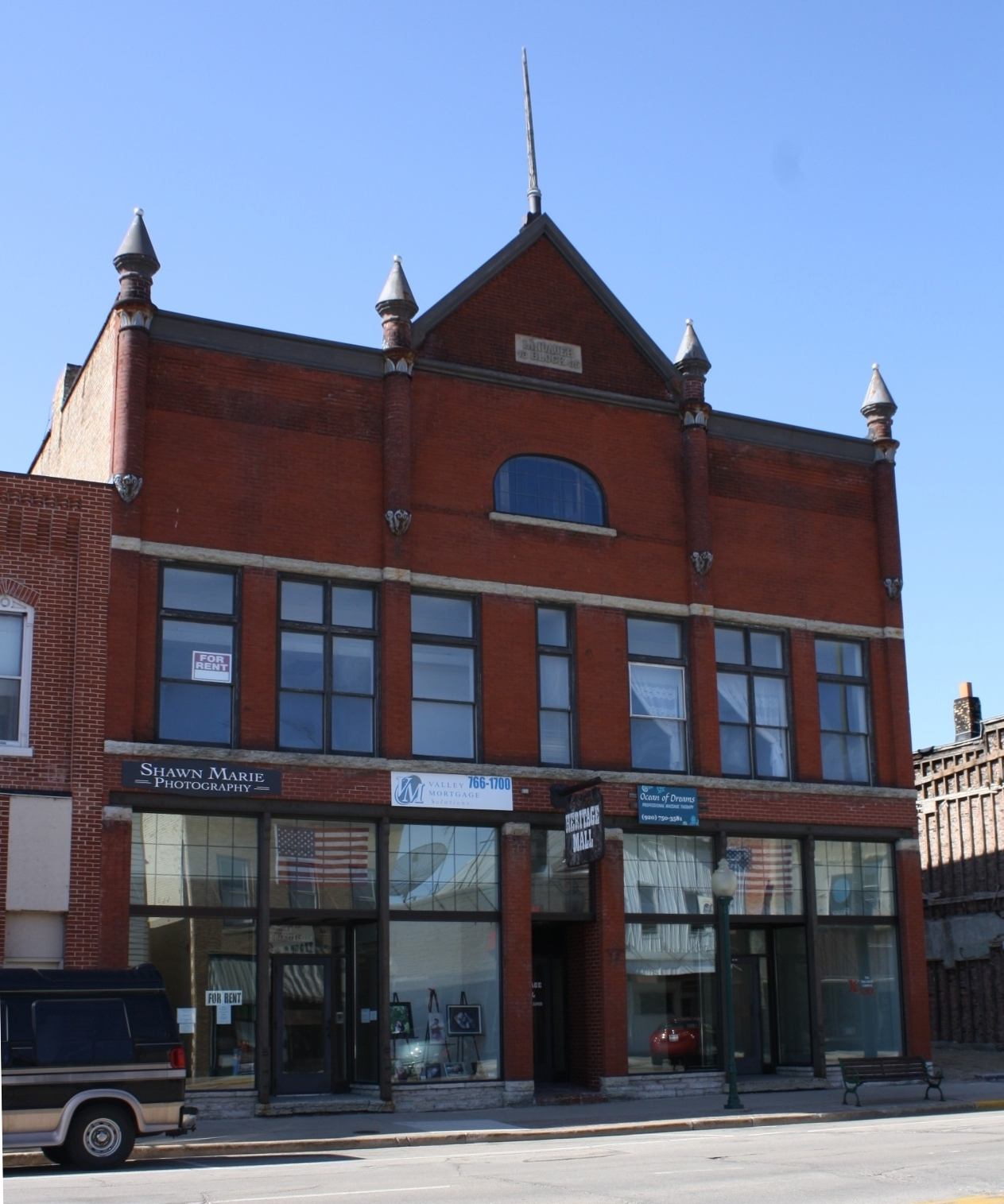
- The Lindauer and Rupert Block

- Location within Wisconsin Location within the United States
- Location: 137-141 E. 2nd St. Kaukauna, Wisconsin
- Coordinates: 44°16′40″N 88°16′17″W
- Built: 1895
- Architectural style: Romanesque
- NRHP reference No.: 84003763
- Added to NRHP: March 29, 1984

The Lindauer and Rupert Block is located in Kaukauna, Wisconsin. It was added to the National Register of Historic Places in 1984 for its significance in commerce and architecture.
