= Julius J. Martens Company Building =

- U.S. National Register of Historic Places
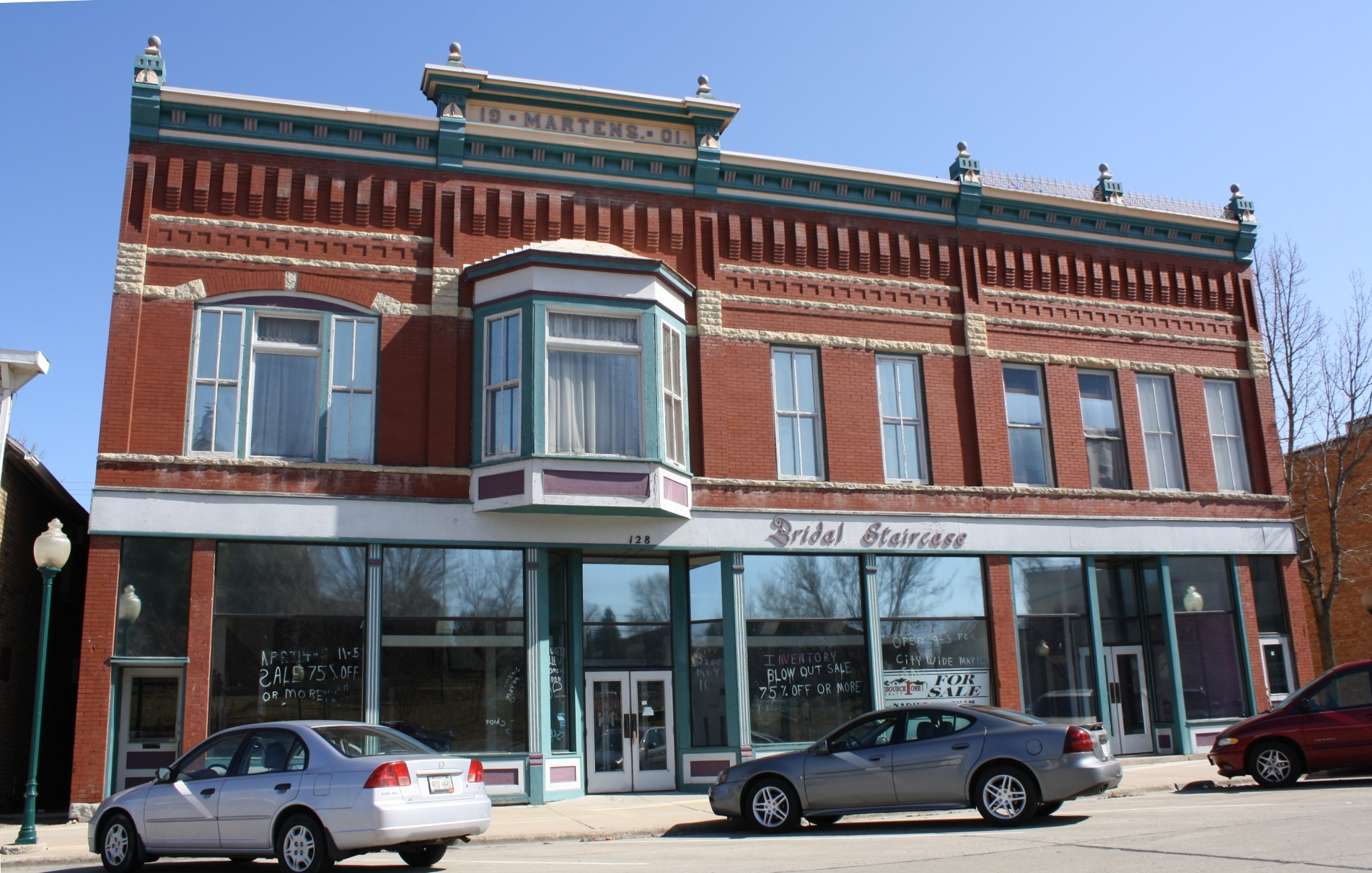
- Julius J. Martens Company Building

- Location within Wisconsin Location within the United States
- Location: 124-128 E. 3d St. Kaukauna, Wisconsin
- Coordinates: 44.27714°N 88.27221°W
- Built: 1901
- NRHP reference No.: 84003764
- Added to NRHP: March 29, 1984

The Julius J. Martens Company Building is a specialty store in Kaukauna, Wisconsin, United States. Previously, the building has been used as a department store. It was added to the National Register of Historic Places in 1984 for its significance in commerce and agriculture.
