= Kaukauna Locks Historic District =

Historic district in Wisconsin, United States

- U.S. National Register of Historic Places
- U.S. Historic district
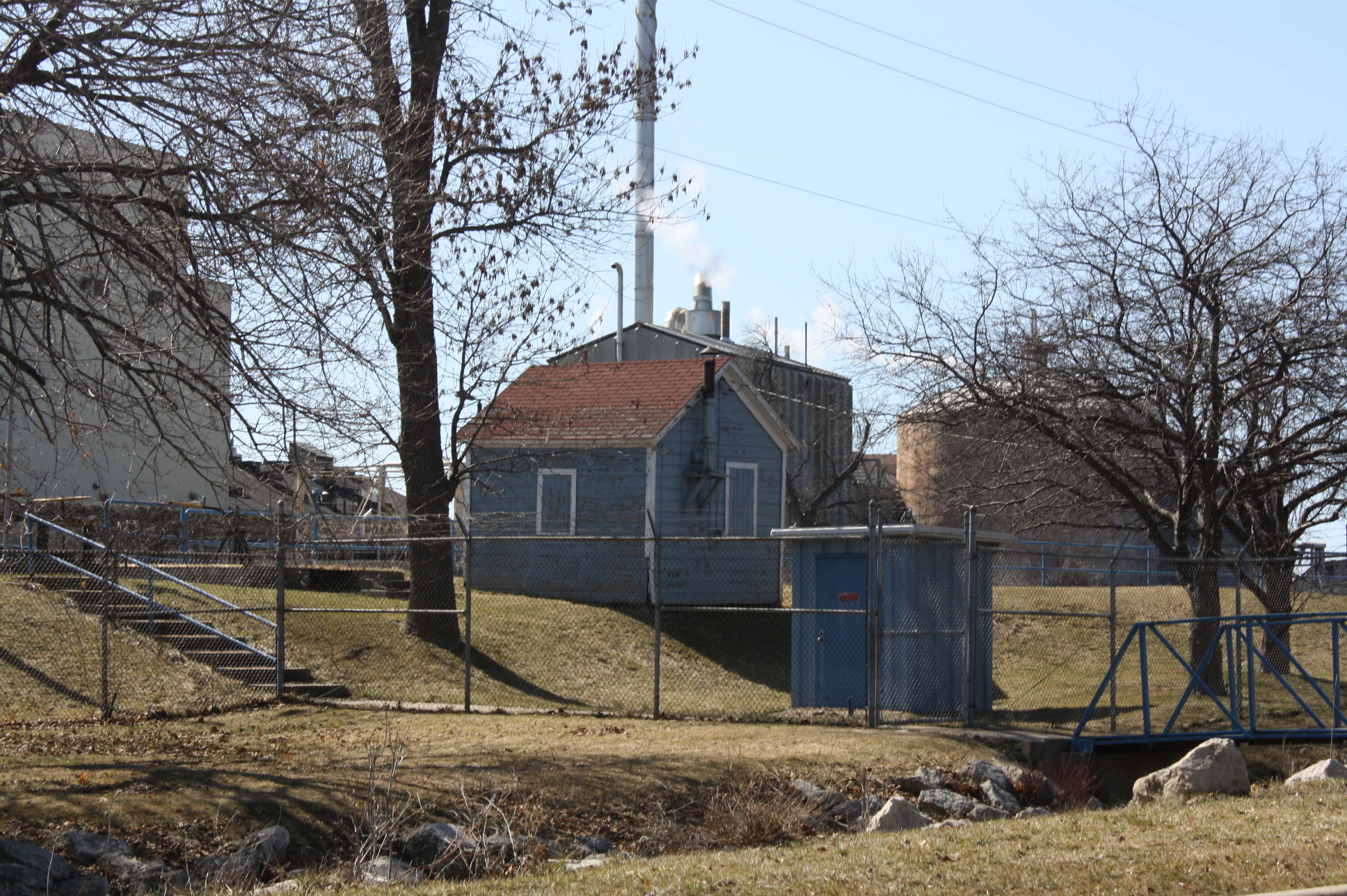
- Kaukauna Locks Historic District

- Location within Wisconsin Location within the United States
- Location: Kaukauna, Wisconsin
- NRHP reference No.: 93001327
- Added to NRHP: December 7, 1993

The Kaukauna Locks Historic District is a lock and dam system in Kaukauna, Wisconsin, United States, that carried boat traffic around a rapids of the Fox River starting in the 1850s as part of the Fox–Wisconsin Waterway. It was added to the National Register of Historic Places in 1993 for its significance in engineering and transport.

== History of area ==
In early Wisconsin, before there were railroads or good wagon roads through the forests, there were rivers. Indians traveled on the rivers, explorers followed, and traders paddled their goods on them. Most significant, the Fox and Wisconsin Rivers nearly connected the Atlantic Ocean and the Great Lakes to the Mississippi River and the middle of North America. By the 1840s people were thinking that this connection on the Fox and Wisconsin Rivers, with only a short portage between the two, could be developed into a channel of commerce—a new Erie Canal—opening the Midwest to development, and profiting those along its path. But parts of the natural Fox River could be traversed only by canoe, and not many buffalo hides or wheat could be hauled in a canoe. The biggest rapids was at Kaukauna, where the river dropped 50 feet (15 m) in the course of 1 mile (1.6 km), requiring a long portage with even a canoe, and blocking a larger cargo vessel.

== Construction ==
In 1848 Congress arranged a land grant to finance the improvement of navigation on the Fox and Wisconsin rivers. In 1851 Wisconsin's Board of Public Works contracted for locks and a dam to be built around the rapids at Kaukauna, but by 1853 this wasn't done and the money was exhausted. The project was turned over to a private venture, the Fox River Improvement Company, and it got the land grant expanded. This organization made headway, and in 1856 a steamship managed to traverse up the Wisconsin and down the Fox to Green Bay. Still, the channels weren't deep enough to make shipping practical. The Company went bankrupt and the project foundered again.

In 1872 the federal government took control of the project. By this time the Kaukauna complex consisted of a 7,400-foot-long (2,300 m) canal, five wooden locks, and a wooden dam 583 feet (178 m) long and 6 feet (1.8 m) high. The Army Corps of Engineers decided to rebuild most parts in stone and concrete. This work began in 1880, and the old dam was finally replaced with concrete in 1932. With that, the lock and dam system was complete as seen today, including these components:

- The canal itself was excavated in the 1850s and dredged repeatedly since. It is 7,000 feet (2,100 m) long and no more than 6 feet (1.8 m) deep. Its width varies from 100 to 250 feet (30 to 76 m), with the wide spots allowing vessels to pass each other.
- Near the top of the canal is the dam, 603 feet (184 m) long and rebuilt of concrete in 1931 and 1932. The pool created by the dam floods the canal to operate the locks. Each end of the dam has a 24-foot-long (7.3 m) spillway. The middle section has eight sluiceways, each with a Tainter gate. The gates are all operated by an electrical winch which slides on a track from gate to gate - known as the "crab."
- The guard lock at the upstream end protected the other locks from surges of water. Built in 1891, it has limestone abutments, and miter gates built of squared wooden timbers.
- Each of the five locks in the canal is about 144 feet (44 m) long by 36 feet (11 m) wide, with walls of limestone block and timber gates. The gates are opened and closed by a hand-crank, gear, and spar. The locks are flooded by gear-operated butterfly valves at the upstream end and emptied by butterfly valves at the downstream end. Each lock lifts a boat about 10 feet (3.0 m), can fill in about four minutes, and empties in about three minutes. Lock 1 was rebuilt in 1882, Lock 2 in 1903, Locks 3 and 4 in 1876-78. Lock 5 is similar to the others except that its walls are rubblestone and wooden planking instead of cut limestone blocks, still the original construction method from the 1850s, although it has been maintained since. Each lock is circled by a pipe railing, and has a lock shack built in 1917.
- The Lockkeeper's House near Lock 1 is a 1.5-story gabled ell structure built around 1890. Nearby is a stable built around 1900 and a boathouse.
- The railroad swing bridge below Lock 2 is not part of the navigation system, but is included in the NRHP nomination. It was built in 1903 with a Warren truss design and an electric motor.

== Decline ==
The waterway across Wisconsin never carried much commerce. The upper Fox was slow and meandering; even the dredges got stuck there. The Wisconsin River below Portage was tricky to navigate because of shifting sandbars. Already in the 1850s wagon roads were improving, and new railroads were being built across the state. And they could run year-round, regardless of water levels. Traffic on the rivers dwindled until the Corps of Engineers recommended in 1982 that the Fox River lock system be dismantled. After years of discussion, in 2004 the Corps transferred the locks to the state. Restoration began in 2017, and now the Kaukauna locks have reopened for seasonal recreational navigation.
