= Appleton Woolen Mills =

- U.S. National Register of Historic Places
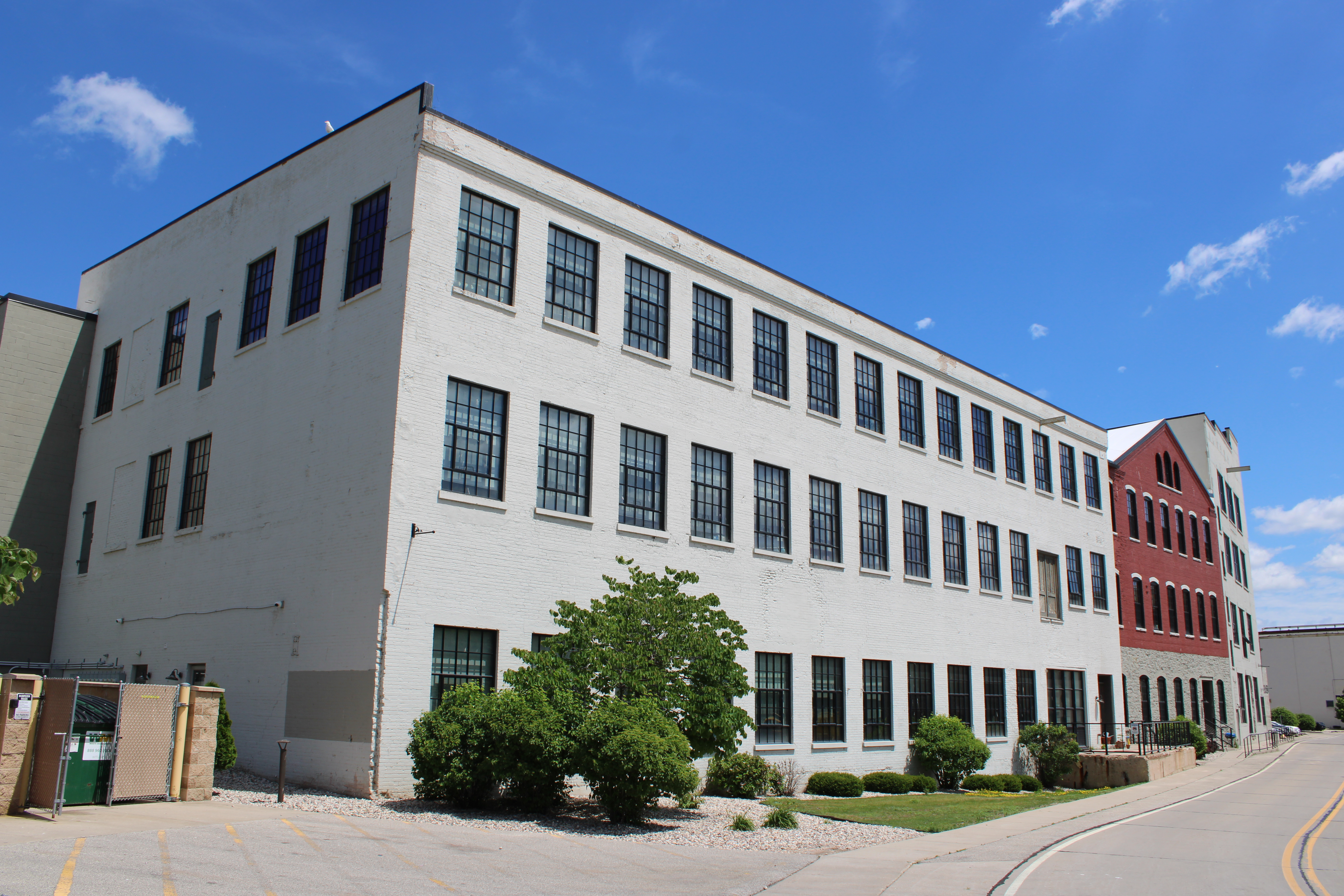
- Location: 218 East South Island St., Appleton, Wisconsin
- Built: 1881
- NRHP reference No.: 16000228
- Added to NRHP: May 3, 2016

The Appleton Woolen Mills was a historic woolen mill along the Fox River in Appleton, Wisconsin. The woolen mill was built in 1881 and was abandoned in 1969 when the company relocated. It was added to the National Register of Historic Places in 2016.
