= Charles A. Grignon House =

Historic house in Wisconsin, United States

- Charles A. Grignon Mansion
- U.S. National Register of Historic Places
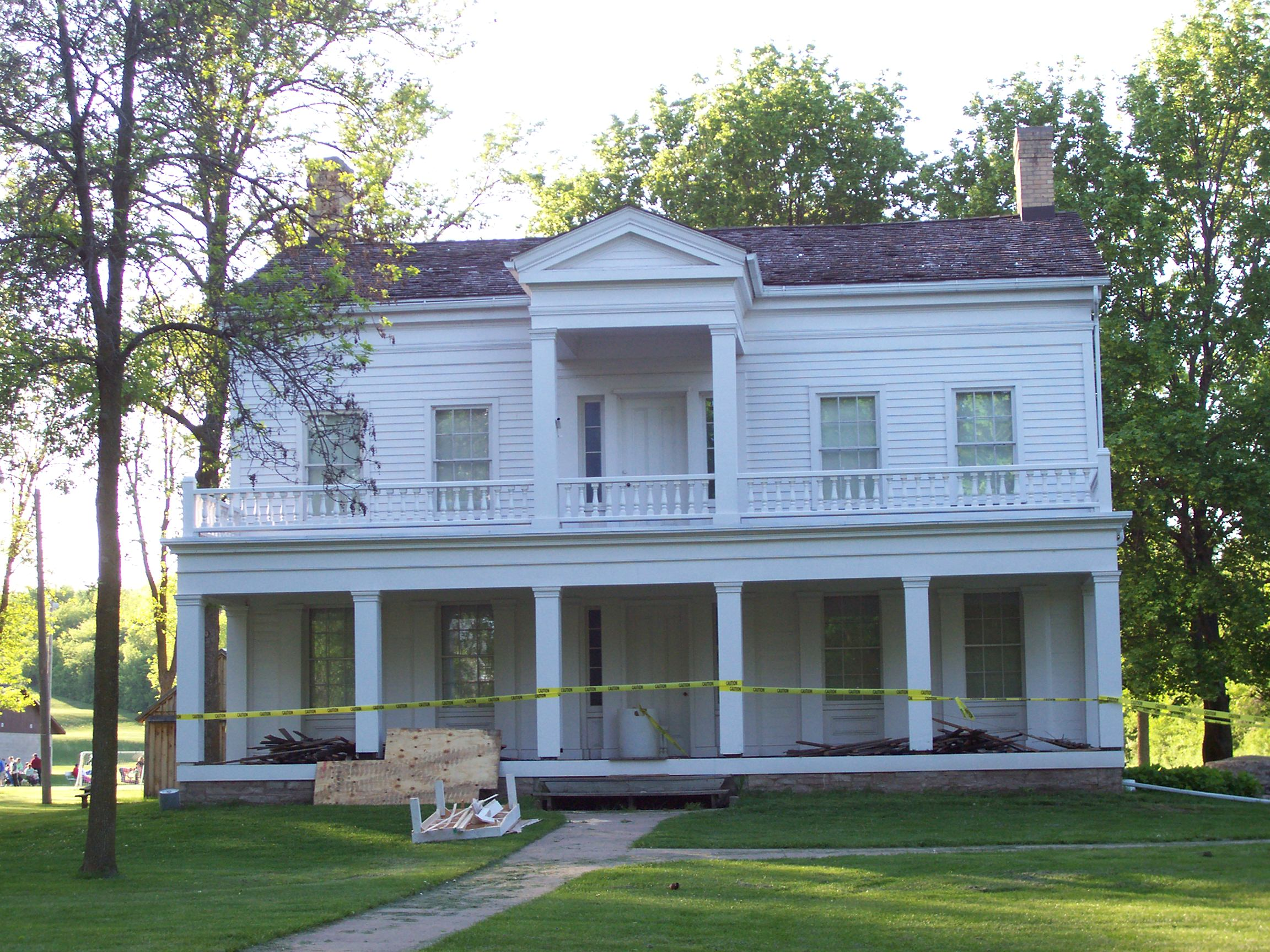
- Charles A. Grignon Mansion
- Location: 1313 Augustine St. Kaukauna, Wisconsin
- Built: 1837
- NRHP reference No.: 72000064
- Added to NRHP: October 18, 1972

The Charles A. Grignon Mansion is located in Kaukauna, Wisconsin, United States. It was added to the National Register of Historic Places in 1972.

== History ==
The Mansion was built by Charles A. Grignon as a wedding gift for his wife, Mary Elizabeth Meade, in 1837. It became known as "The Mansion in the Woods" to travelers.

Currently, the Mansion serves as a museum.
