= Joseph Kronser Hotel and Saloon =

- U.S. National Register of Historic Places
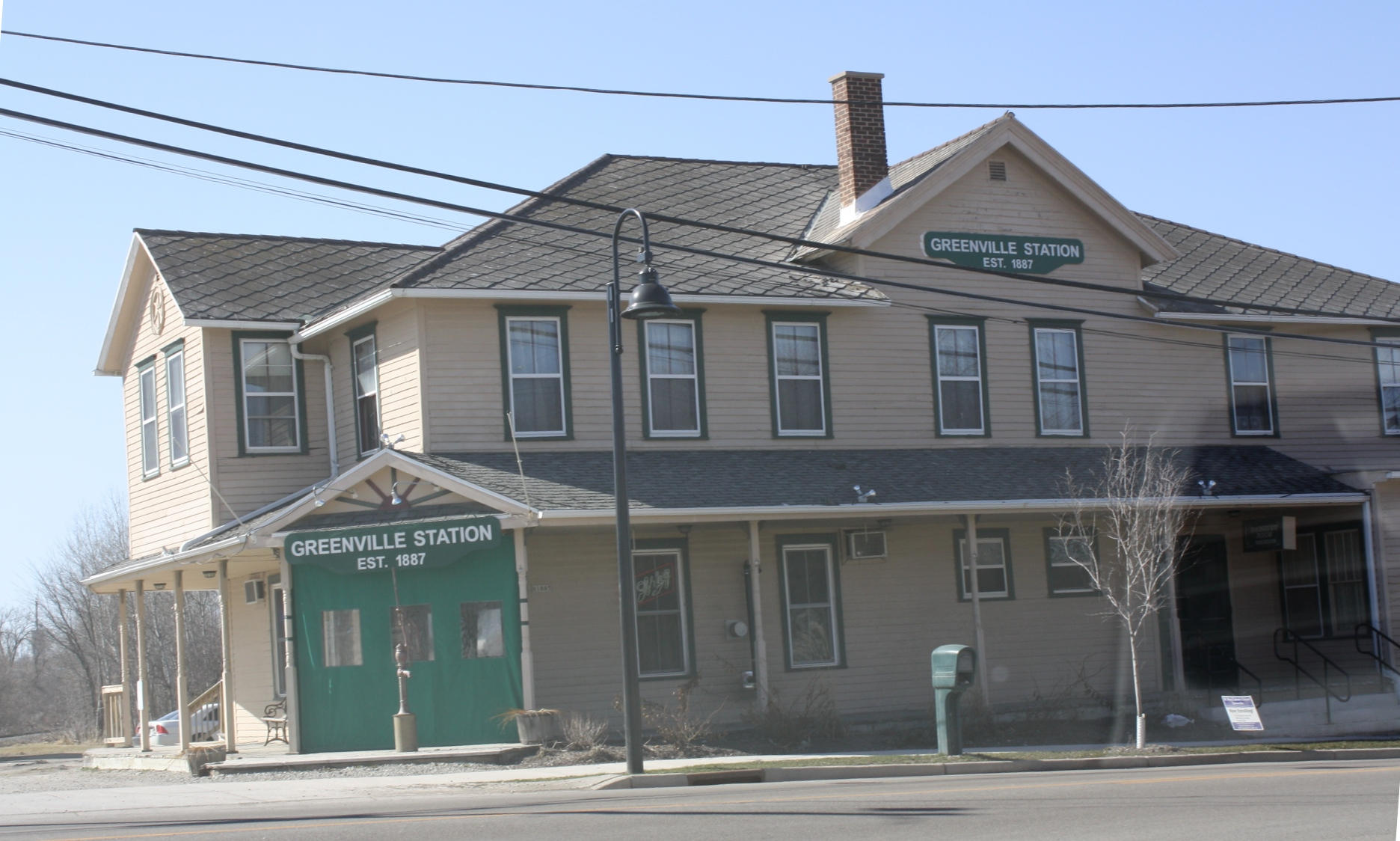
- The hotel and saloon in 2010

- Location within Wisconsin
- Location: N1865 Municipal Dr., Greenville, Wisconsin
- Coordinates: 44.3081°N 88.53695°W
- Built: 1897
- Architectural style: Vernacular
- NRHP reference No.: 88001153
- Added to NRHP: July 28, 1988

The Joseph Kronser Hotel and Saloon of Greenville, Wisconsin, United States, was built in 1897. The hotel and saloon also were primarily intended for railroad travelers along the adjacent Chicago and North Western Railway line. The hotel had five rooms available and also housed the ticket office for the railroad. The building also featured the first post office in town until the 1940s, a barbershop from the 1940s to 1968 and a gas station after 1929.

The building was added to the National Register of Historic Places in 1988 as well as the State Register of Historic Places in 1989 for its significance in architecture and to the development of Greenville.

Preceding station	Chicago and North Western Railway	Following station
Hortonville toward Antigo	Manitowoc - Antigo	Kimberly toward Manitowoc
