= Kuehn Blacksmith Shop–Hardware Store =

- U.S. National Register of Historic Places
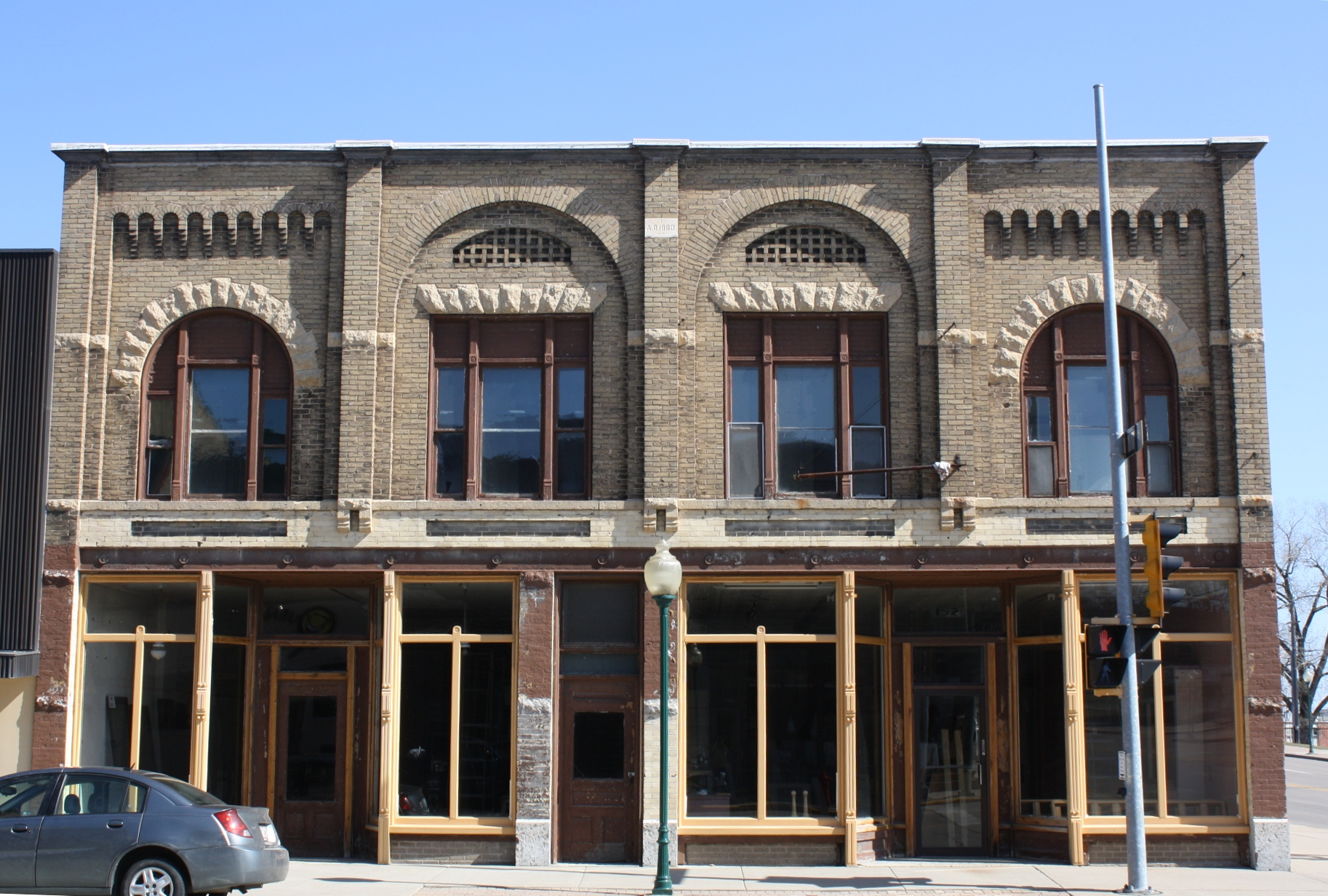
- Kuehn Blacksmith Shop–Hardware Store
- Location: 148-152 E. 2nd St. Kaukauna, Wisconsin
- Coordinates: 44.27744°N 88.27097°W
- Built: 1889
- Architectural style: Romanesque/Romanesque Revival
- NRHP reference No.: 84003761
- Added to NRHP: March 29, 1984

Kuehn Blacksmith Shop–Hardware Store is located in Kaukauna, Wisconsin. It was added to the National Register of Historic Places in 1984 for its architectural significance.
