= Merritt Black House =

Historic house in Wisconsin, United States

- U.S. National Register of Historic Places
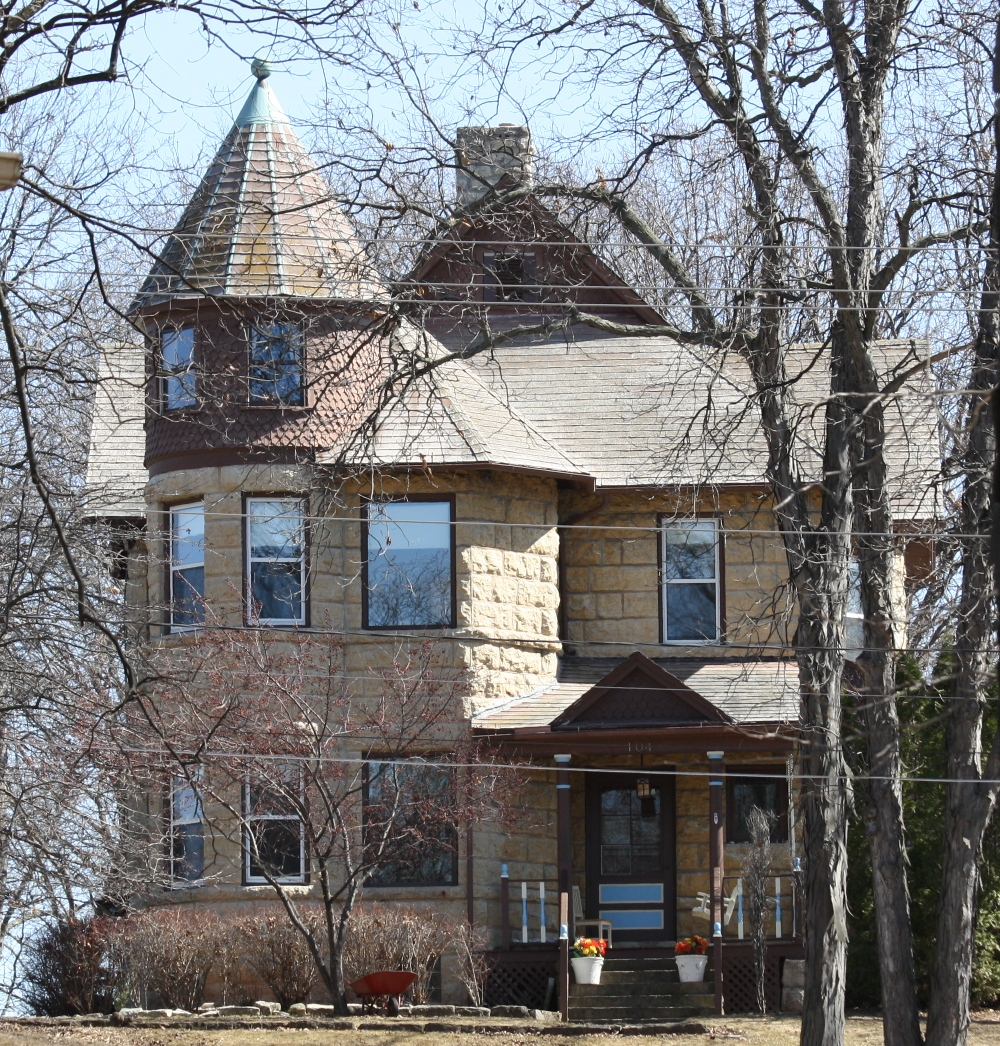

- Location within Wisconsin Location within the United States
- Location: 104 River Rd. Kaukauna, Wisconsin
- Coordinates: 44°17′10″N 88°16′40″W
- Built: 1898
- Architectural style: Queen Anne
- NRHP reference No.: 84003752
- Added to NRHP: March 29, 1984

The Merritt Black House is a historic house built in 1898 along the Fox River in Kaukauna, Wisconsin. In 1984 it was listed on the National Register of Historic Places.

The two-story house was built in 1898 in the Queen Anne style of architecture. The exterior walls are of rusticated stone cut from a local quarry operated by Merritt Black himself. The stone is a bit unusual for Queen Anne, but the varied surface finishes, the bay windows, the 3-story corner tower, the asymmetry, and the complex roof are all typical of the style. If the shape of the house looks a bit abrupt for Queen Anne, it may be because it originally had broad porches wrapping around several sides, which have been removed. Inside are oak doors and stairs and maple floors. In the basement are rooms for vegetable and fruit storage. The house was designed by the Smith brothers of Appleton. The carpenter was Gus Keck, the mason Joseph Schwenderman, and the painter Walter Cuel.

Merritt Black's father Andrew was born in Ohio and came to Wisconsin in 1846. He bought hundreds of acres in north Kaukauna and began to farm, and to speculate in farmlands. J. Merritt, the youngest surviving son, helped his father farm and operated a stone quarry. In 1898 he built the house described above. He later drilled wells, farmed and worked as a realtor. After J. Merritt died, his son Merritt A. lived in the house, working in real estate and insurance. The house was known as the Black Castle.
