= Frank St. Andrews House =

Historic house in Wisconsin, United States

- U.S. National Register of Historic Places
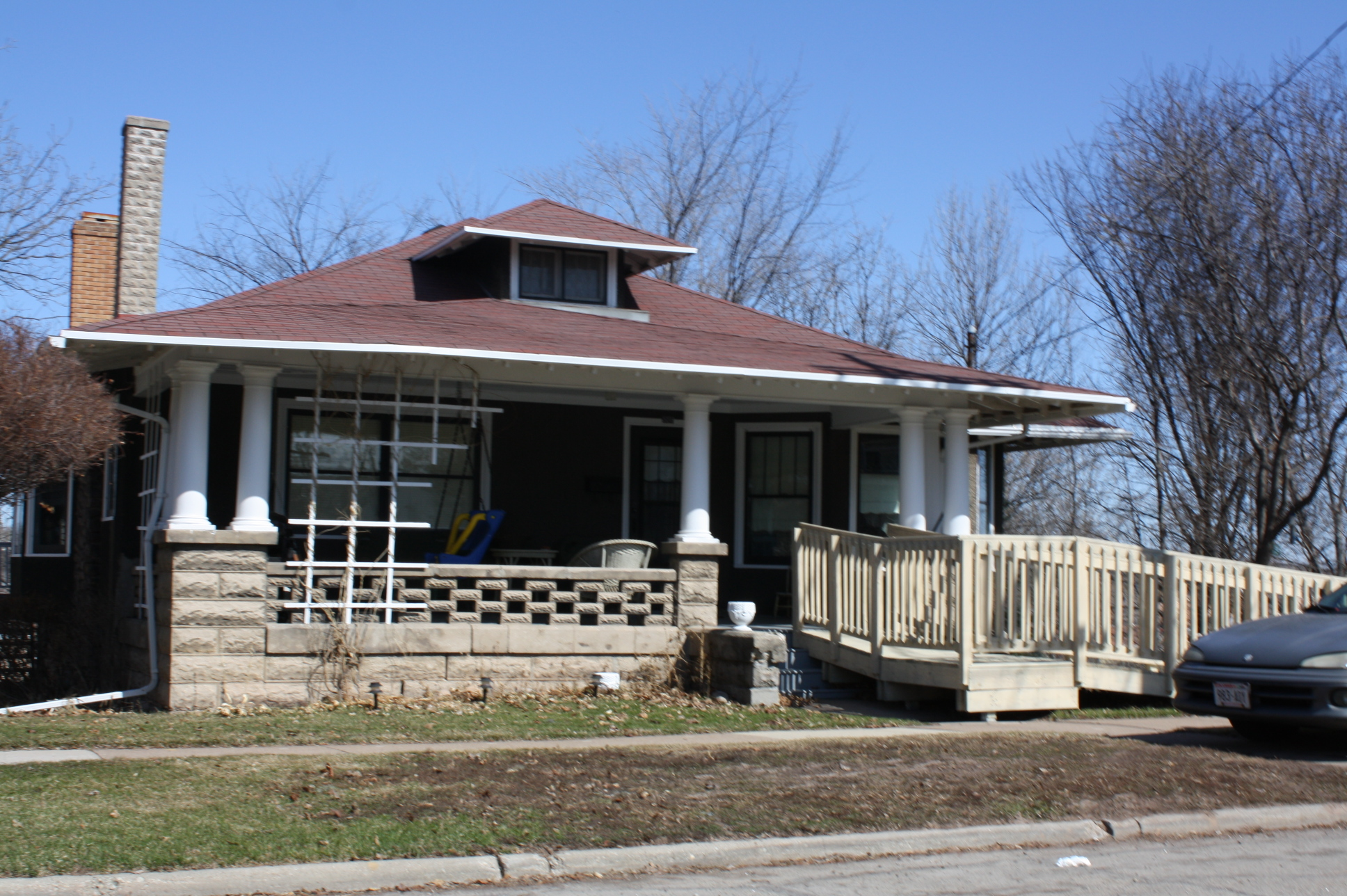

- Location within Wisconsin Location within the United States
- Location: 320 Dixon St. Kaukauna, Wisconsin
- Coordinates: 44°16′32″N 88°16′13″W
- Built: 1911
- Architectural style: Craftsman/Bungalow
- NRHP reference No.: 84003768
- Added to NRHP: March 29, 1984

The Frank St. Andrews House is a historic house located in Kaukauna, Wisconsin. It was added to the National Register of Historic Places for its architectural significance on March 29, 1984.
