= Holy Cross Church (Kaukauna, Wisconsin) =

Historic church in Wisconsin, United States

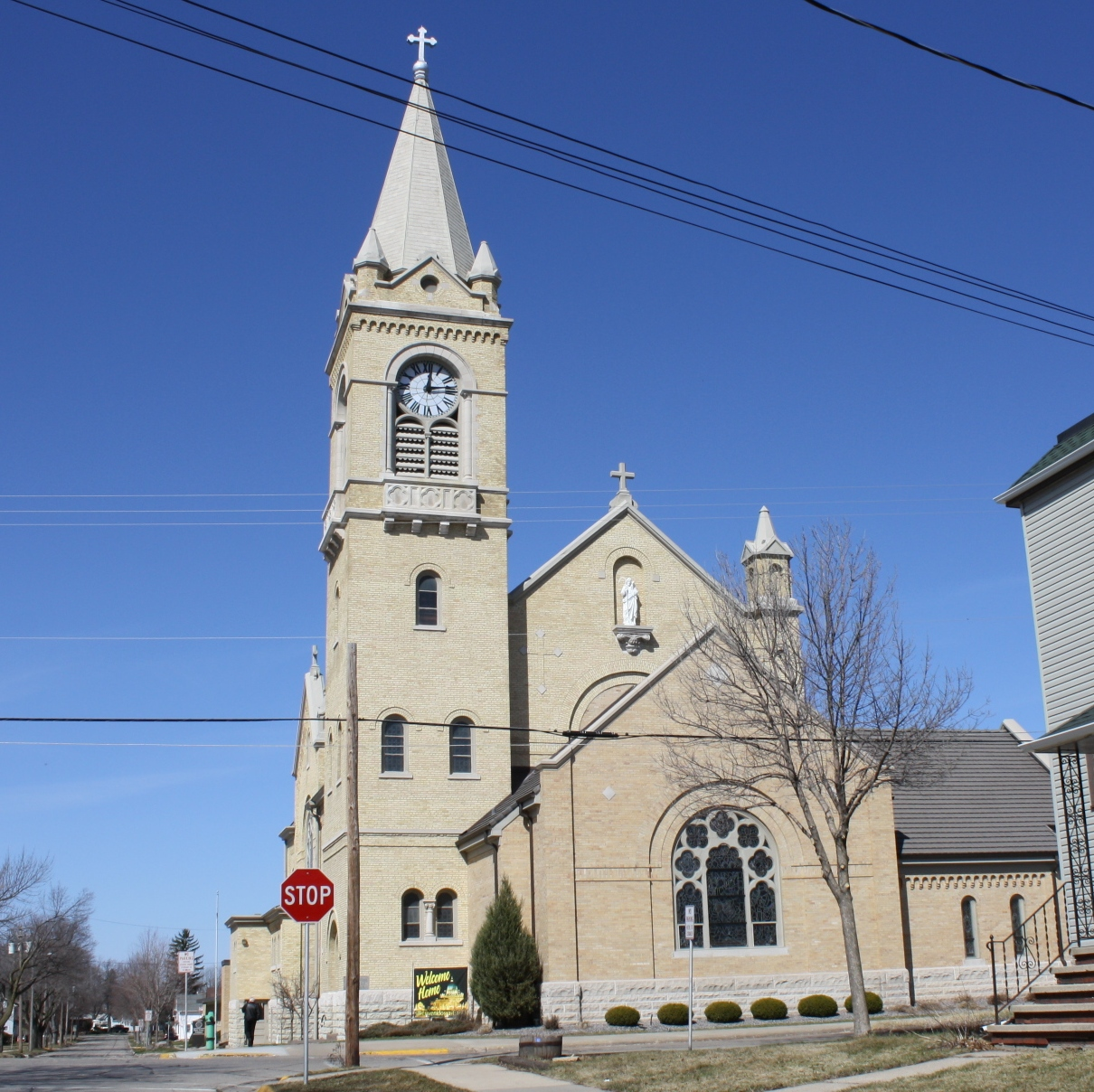
- Holy Cross Church
- 44.2837°N 88.269181°W
- Location: 309 Desnoyer St; Kaukauna, Wisconsin 54130
- Country: United States
- Denomination: Roman Catholic
- Website: www.holycrosskaukauna.org

History
- Dedicated: December 26, 1873

Architecture
- Architectural type: Neogothic/Romanesque
- Completed: 1916

Administration
- Province: Roman Catholic Ecclesiastical Province of Milwaukee
- Diocese: Roman Catholic Diocese of Green Bay
- Parish: Holy Cross Parish

Clergy
- Pastor: Fr. Don Everts

Holy Cross Church is a Roman Catholic church built in 1916 in Kaukauna, Wisconsin, United States. It was listed on the National Register of Historic Places on March 29, 1984.

== Former pastors ==
From 1873 to 1878 the Holy Cross Chapel was a mission served by the pastors of Holy Angels Parish of Darboy, Wisconsin.

- Fr. Julius Rhode (1878–1907)
- Msgr. Peter J. Lochman (1908–1932)
- Fr. Peter Grosnick ( ? -1947)
- Fr. Andrew Quella (1947–1966)
- Fr. Andrew Linsmeyer (1966–1973)
- Fr. Roy Crain (1973–1986)
- Fr. John ("Jack") Mullarkey (1986-2007)
- Fr. Tom Pomeroy (2007–2018)
- Fr. Don Everts (2018–2023)
- Fr. Luke Ferris (2023-present)
