= Nicolet Public School =

- U.S. National Register of Historic Places
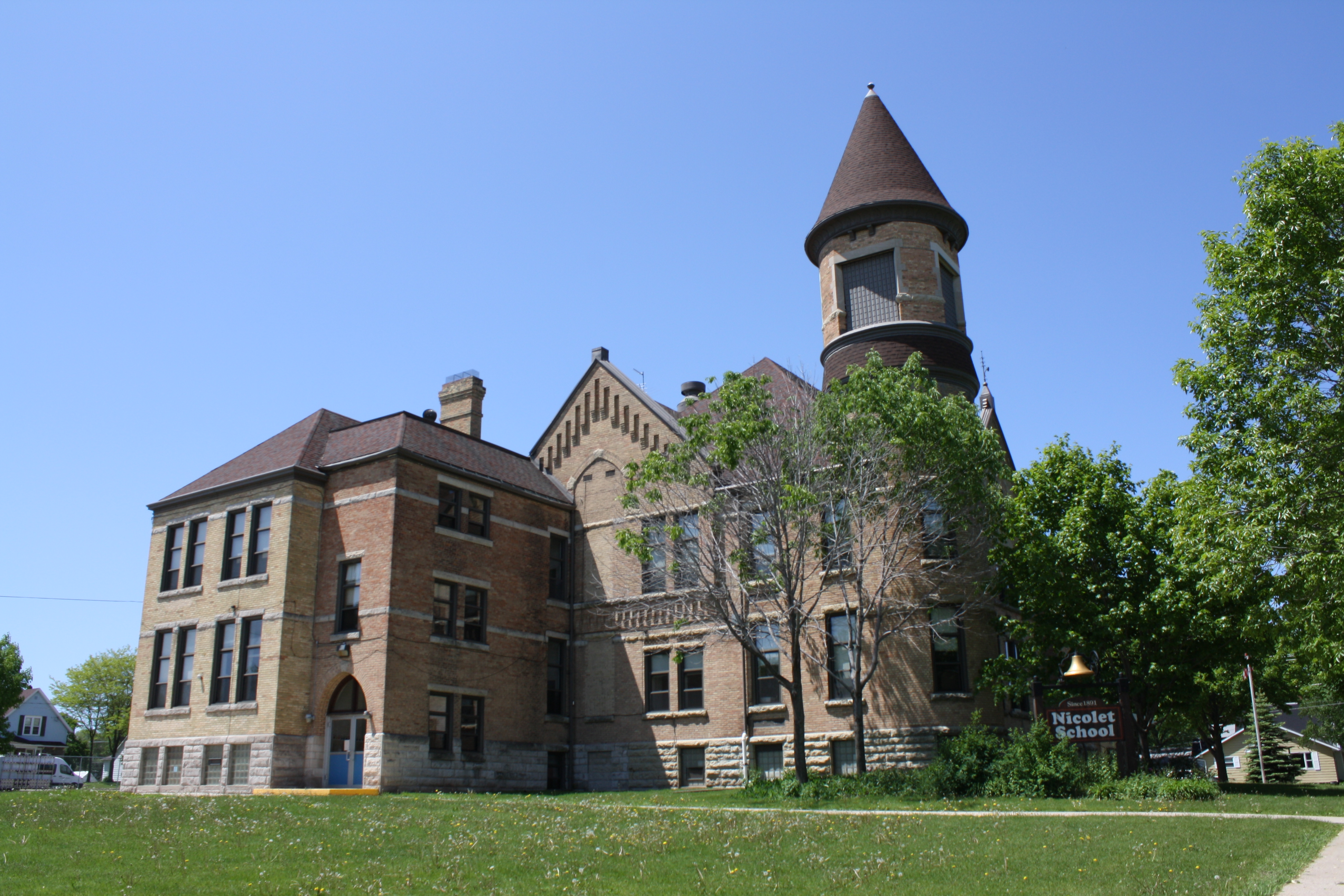
- Nicolet Public School
- Location: 109 E. 8th St. Kaukauna, Wisconsin
- Coordinates: 44.27345°N 88.27438°W
- Built: 1891
- Architectural style: Romanesque/Romanesque Revival
- NRHP reference No.: 84003767
- Added to NRHP: March 29, 1984

Nicolet Public School is located in Kaukauna, Wisconsin. Formerly, it served as an elementary school, but currently serves as office and educational space for non-profit organizations. It was added to the National Register of Historic Places in 1984 for its architectural significance.
