= Capt. Matthew J. Meade House =

Historic house in Wisconsin, United States

- U.S. National Register of Historic Places
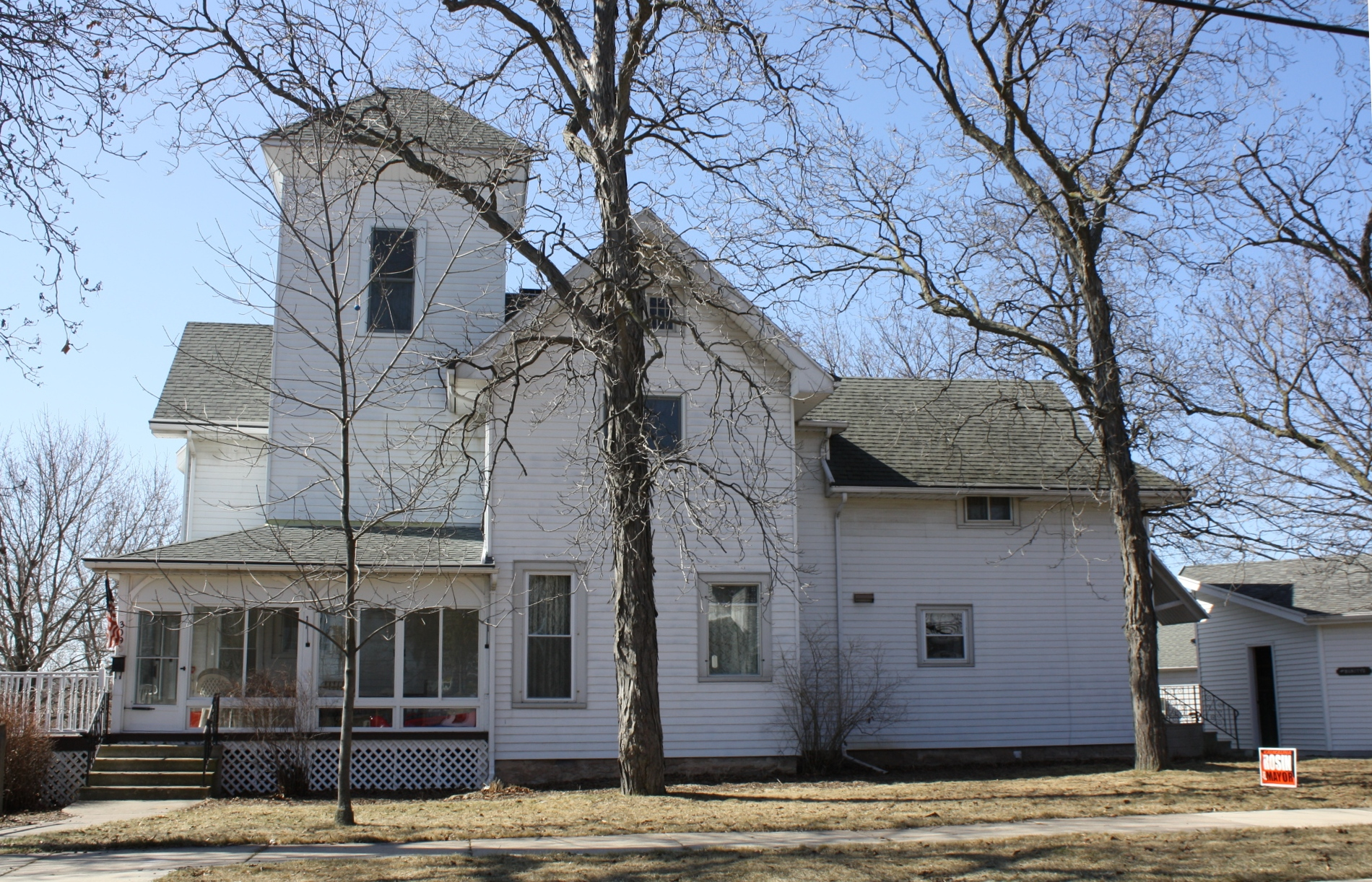

- Location within Wisconsin Location within the United States
- Location: 309 Division St., Kaukauna, Wisconsin
- Coordinates: 44°17′10″N 88°16′2″W
- Area: less than one acre
- Built: 1884
- NRHP reference No.: 84003765
- Added to NRHP: March 29, 1984

The Capt. Matthew J. Meade House is a historic house located at 309 Division Street in Kaukauna, Wisconsin. It was added to the National Register of Historic Places for its industrial significance on March 29, 1984.
