= Former United States Post Office (Kaukauna, Wisconsin) =

- U.S. National Register of Historic Places
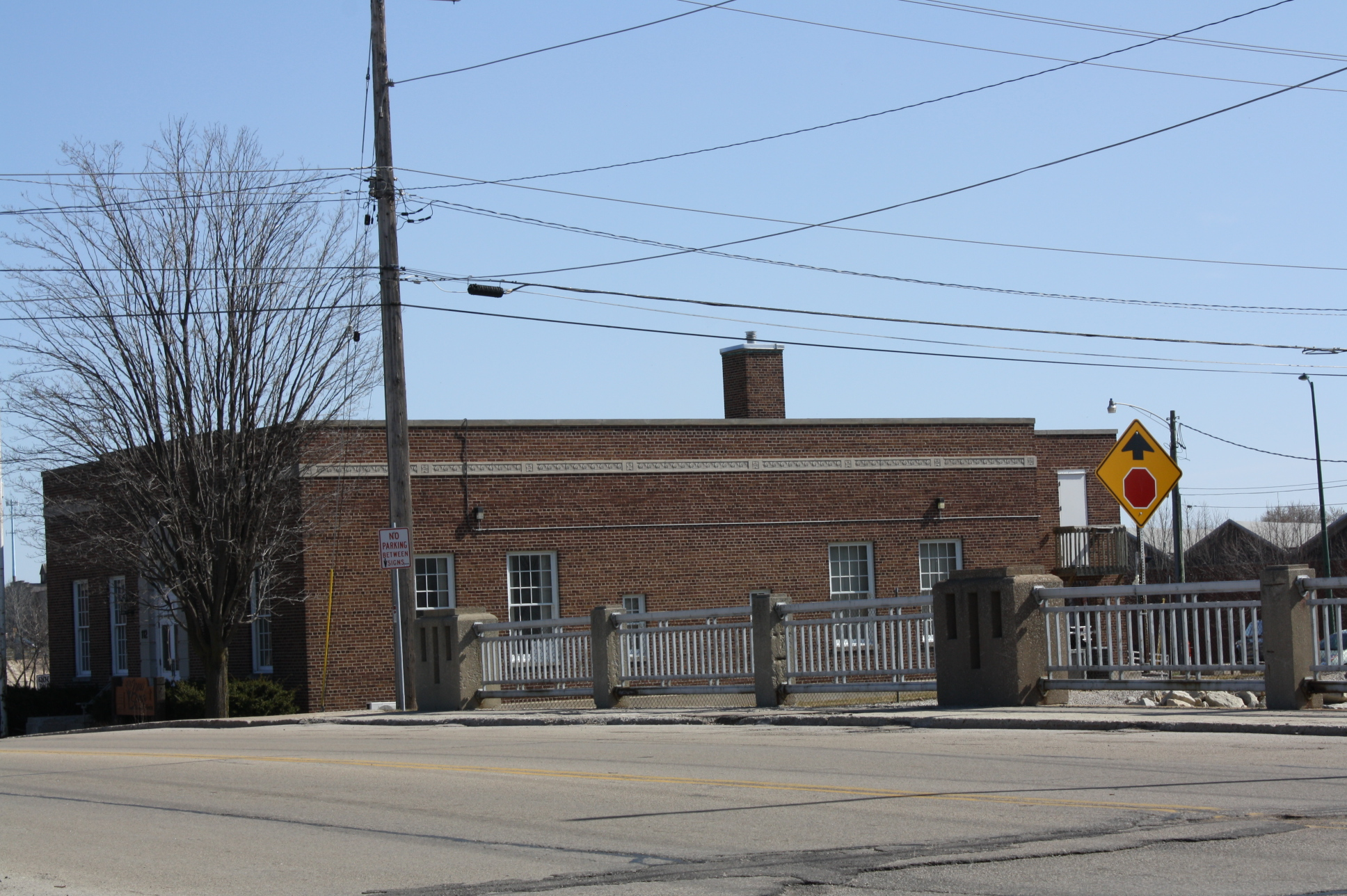
- The former United States Post Office of Kaukauna, Wisconsin.
- Location: 112 Main Ave. Kaukauna, Wisconsin
- Coordinates: 44.27884°N 88.27041°W
- Built: 1934
- Architect: Louis A. Simon
- Architectural style: Colonial Revival/Moderne/Georgian Revival
- NRHP reference No.: 91001990
- Added to NRHP: January 22, 1992

The Former United States Post Office of Kaukauna, Wisconsin, United States, was designed by Louis A. Simon and built around 1934. It was added to the National Register of Historic Places in 1992 for its significance in politics, government and architecture. It previously contained the mural of Grignon trading with the Indians, by Vladimir Rousseff, which is now in the new post office.
