= Fargo's Furniture Store =

- U.S. National Register of Historic Places
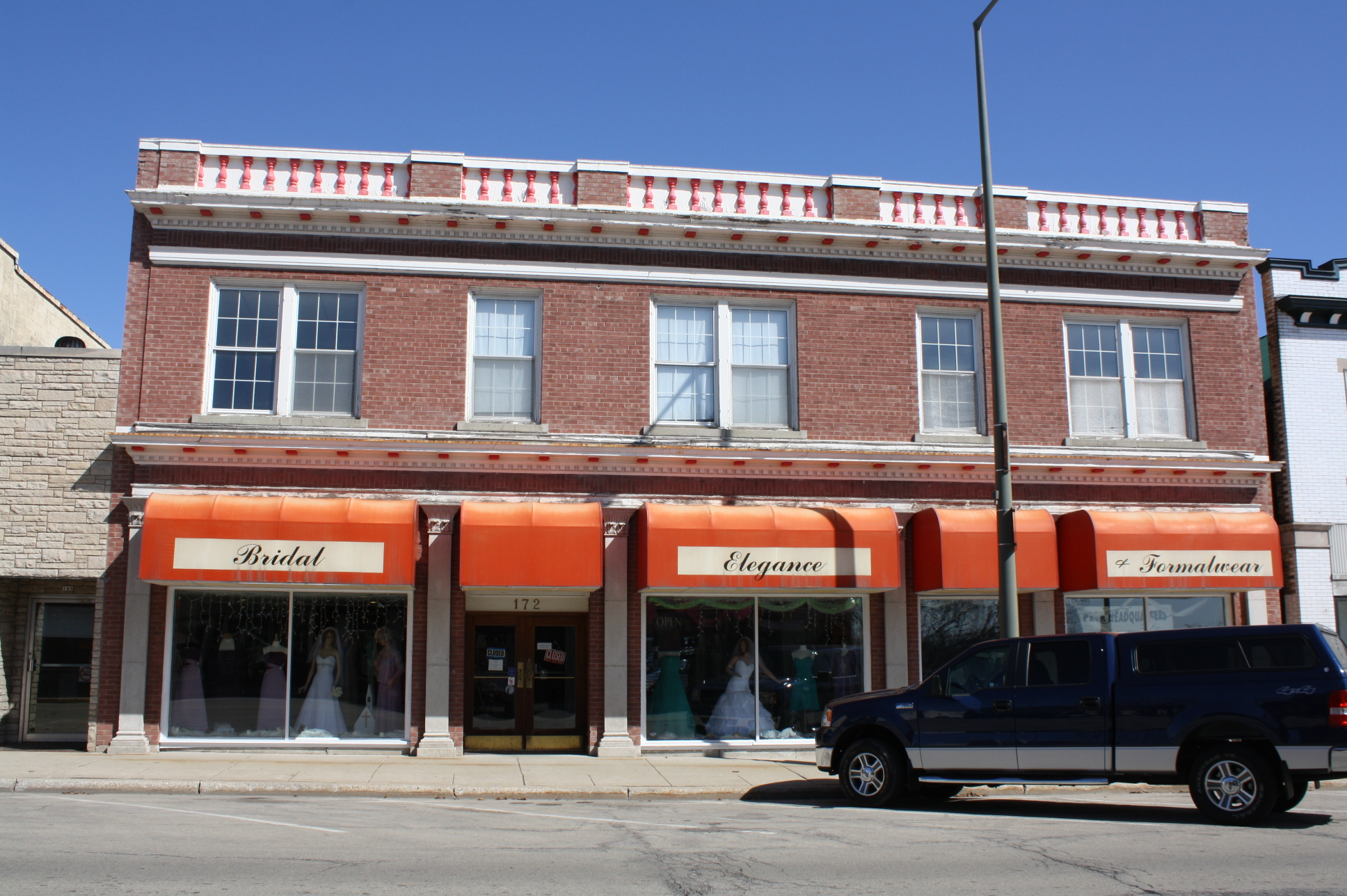
- Fargo's Furniture Store

- Location within Wisconsin Location within the United States
- Location: 172-176 W. Wisconsin Ave. Kaukauna, Wisconsin
- Coordinates: 44.28274°N 88.26924°W
- Architectural style: Classical Revival
- NRHP reference No.: 84003755
- Added to NRHP: March 29, 1984

Fargo's Furniture Store is a specialty store in Kaukauna, Wisconsin. It was added to the National Register of Historic Places for its architectural significance in 1984.
