= Cedars Lock and Dam Historic District =

Historic district in Wisconsin, United States

- U.S. National Register of Historic Places
- U.S. Historic district
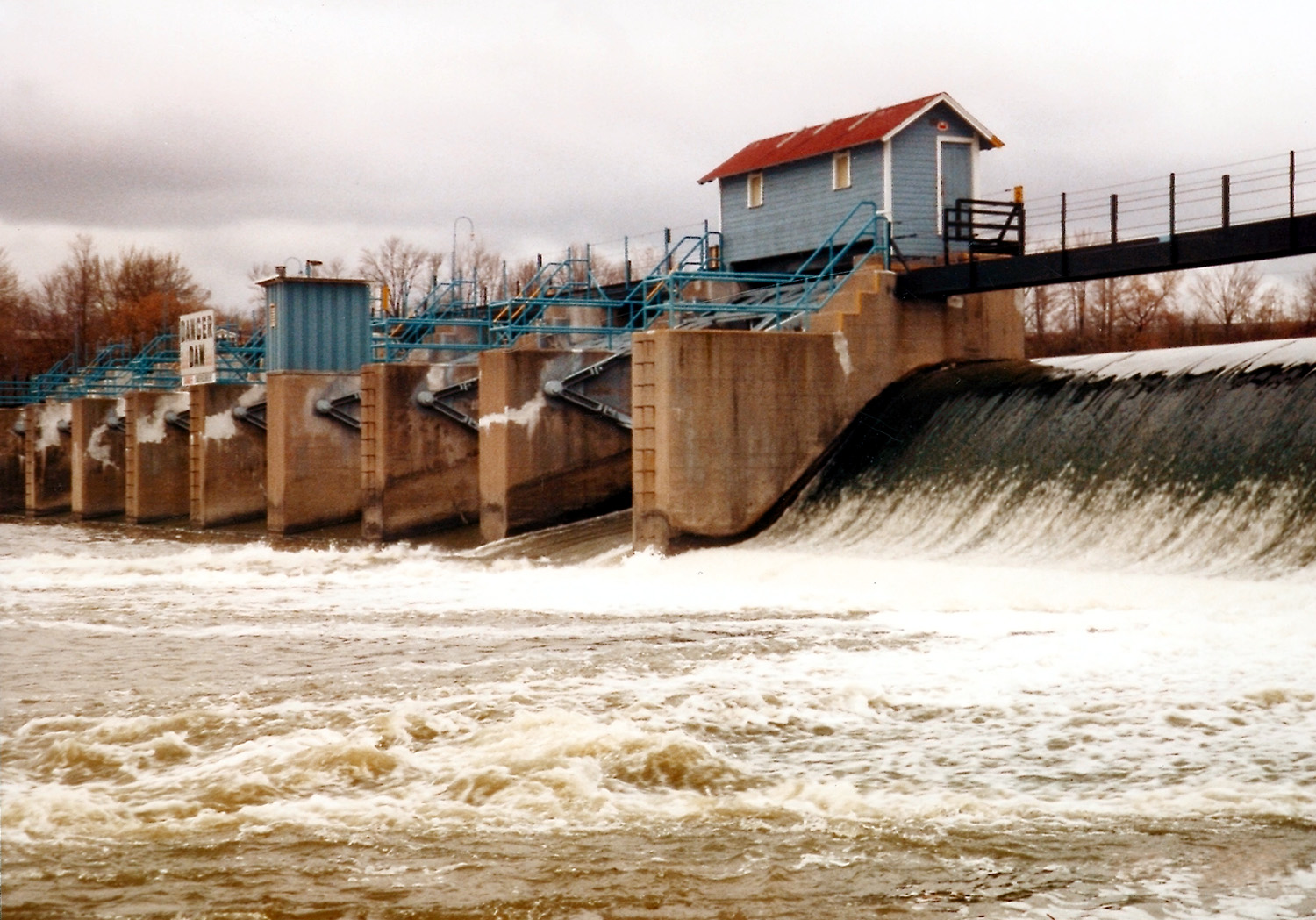
- Little Chute Dame in the Cedars Lock and Dam Historic District.

- Location within Wisconsin Location within the United States
- Location: Little Chute, Wisconsin
- Coordinates: 44.27552°N 88.31822°W
- NRHP reference No.: 93001328
- Added to NRHP: December 7, 1993

The Cedars Lock and Dam Historic District is a district in Little Chute, Wisconsin, United States. It is named after the Cedars Lock, found in the district. The lock took its name from the Treaty of the Cedars. In 1993 the district was added to the National Register of Historic Places for its significance in engineering and transport.
