= Norman Brokaw House =

Historic house in Wisconsin, United States

- U.S. National Register of Historic Places
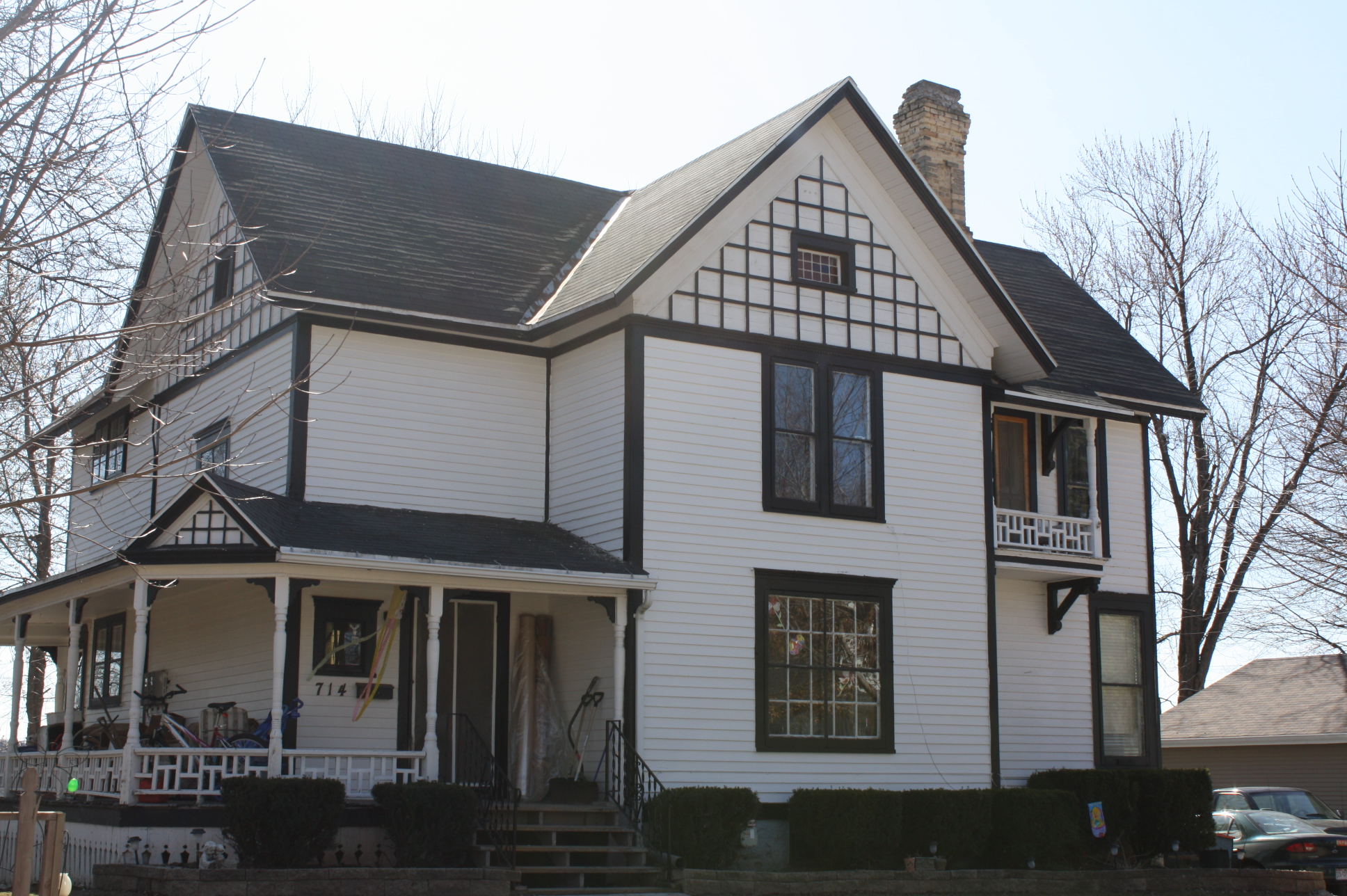

- Location within Wisconsin Location within the United States
- Location: 714 Grignon St. Kaukauna, Wisconsin
- Coordinates: 44.28336°N 88.26209°W
- Area: less than one acre
- Built: 1885
- MPS: Kaukauna MRA
- NRHP reference No.: 84003754
- Added to NRHP: March 29, 1984

The Norman Brokaw House is a historic house located at 714 Grignon Street in Kaukauna, Wisconsin.

== Description and history ==
The 2 1/2-story house was built in 1885. It has a Queen Anne design with clapboard siding, a large front porch, a cross-gabled roof with lattice patterns in the gable ends, and a corbelled brick chimney. The house's interior has been split into two apartments, but its plan is otherwise original.

Owner Norman Brokaw built and operated several paper mills in Kaukauna. Originally from Michigan, he moved to Kaukauna in 1885 after purchasing a stake in the Little Badger mill. After selling that mill in 1889, he founded the Kaukauna Fibre Company and built a new paper mill, which he replaced in 1893 after it burned down. He also helped found a Methodist congregation in Kaukana, which was renamed the Brokaw Memorial Methodist Episcopal Church after his death. In addition, he served as a trustee of Lawrence University. Brokaw lived in the house until his death in 1900.

The house was added to the National Register of Historic Places in 1984 for its industrial significance.
