= Kaukauna, Wisconsin =

- City
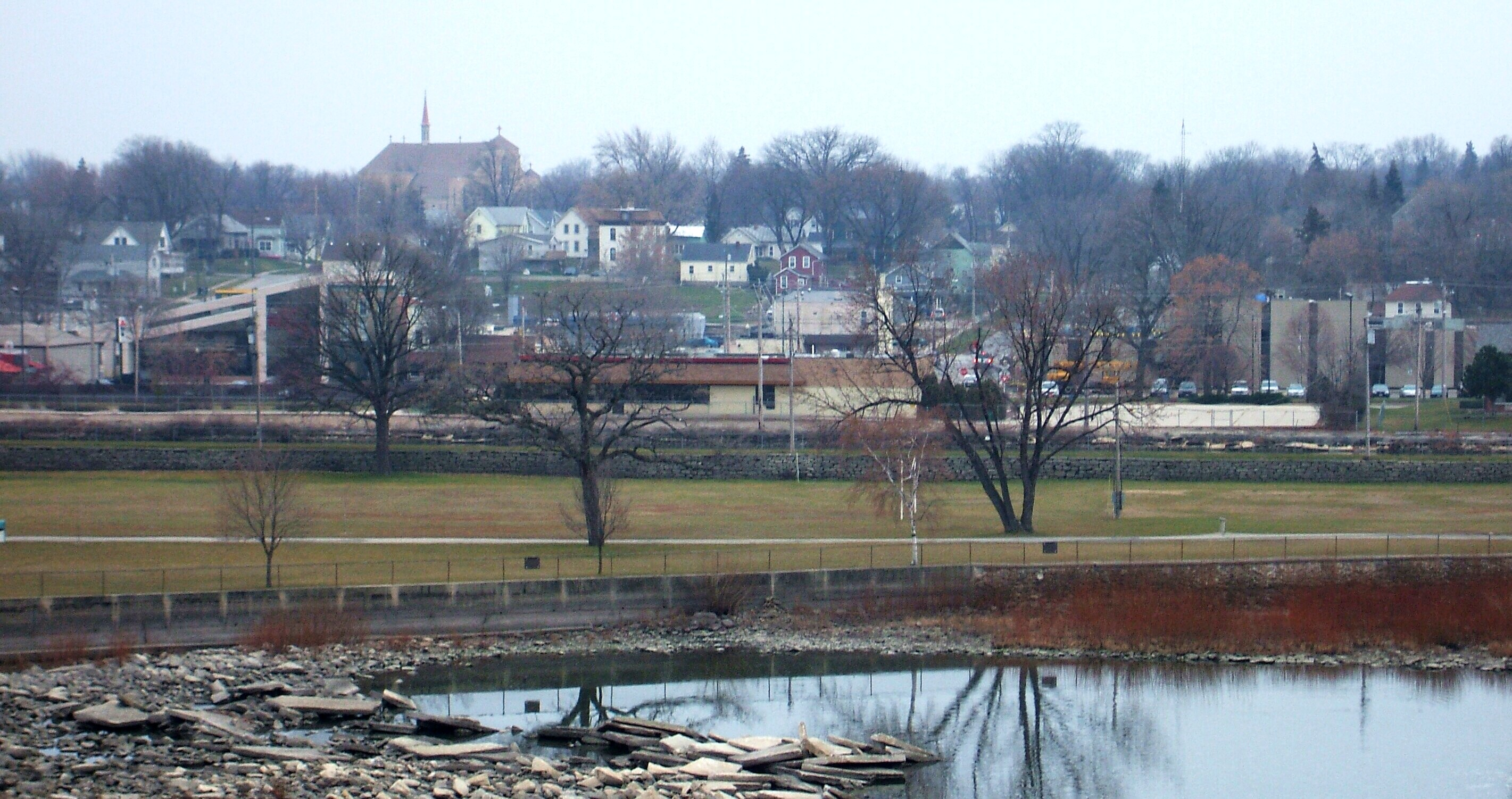
- Kaukauna's south side downtown, as seen from Statue Park. The Fox River is in the foreground and the Civic Center is on the far right.
- Nicknames: The Electric City, The Lion on the Fox
- Location of Kaukauna in Outagamie County, Wisconsin.

- Location within Wisconsin Location within the United States
- Coordinates: 44°17′N 88°16′W
- Country: United States
- State: Wisconsin
- Counties: Outagamie, Calumet
- Surrounding Towns: Kaukauna, Buchanan, Harrison, Vandenbroek
- Settled: 1793
- Incorporated: 1885

Government
  - Type: Mayor-Council
  - Mayor: Anthony Penterman

Area
  - City: 8.23 sq mi (21.32 km^{2})
  - Land: 7.82 sq mi (20.25 km^{2})
  - Water: 0.41 sq mi (1.07 km^{2}) 4.96%
- Elevation: 650 ft (198 m)

Population (2020)
  - City: 17,089
  - Density: 2,186/sq mi (843.9/km^{2})
  - Metro: 360,000
- Time zone: UTC-6 (CST)
  - Summer (DST): UTC-5 (CDT)
- ZIP Code: 54130
- Area code: 920
- FIPS code: 55-38800
- GNIS feature ID: 1567364
- Website: https://kaukauna.gov/

Kaukauna (/kəˈkɔːnə/) is a city located in Outagamie and Calumet counties, Wisconsin, United States. It is situated on the Fox River, approximately 100 miles (160 km) north of Milwaukee. The population was 17,089 at the 2020 census. It is a part of the Appleton, Wisconsin Metropolitan Statistical Area.

== History ==
Kaukauna is a Native American word and in various languages means "portage", "long portage", "place where pickerel are caught", and "place of pike". This area was traditionally home to the Ho-Chunk and Menominee peoples. The first Europeans in the area were the French. The first Catholic missionary in the area, Fr. Claude Allouez, commented on the "apple trees and vine stalks in abundance" that he found the people of Kaukauna cultivating. Kaukauna became an outpost of trade in Green Bay and saw much intermarriage between French and Menominee people, leading to a Métis culture which produced local leaders such as Augustin Grignon.

The first recorded land deed in Wisconsin was assigned to Dominique Ducharme in 1793. He obtained 1,281 acres (518 ha) from the Menominee Indians for two barrels of rum and other gifts. These acres are the original site of the town of Kaukauna. The property was purchased by Charles A. Grignon (and recorded Dec. 18, 1828), who built a mansion on the river on Kaukauna's north side. The home, which bears Grignon's name, is operated as a museum by the Outagamie County Historical Society.

In 1836, following years of negotiations about how to accommodate the Oneida, Stockbridge-Munsee, and Brothertown peoples who were removed from New York, the Menominee ceded over four million acres of land to the United States in the Treaty of the Cedars. Grignon of Kaukauna was one of the signatories of the treaty.

Prior to 1880, and shortly afterwards, Kaukauna was known as "The Lion on the Fox". This nickname was changed to "The Electric City" upon the completion of the hydroelectric plant. When the city was incorporated in 1885, it was separated from the adjacent rural parts of the town.

== Geography ==
Kaukauna is located in southeastern Outagamie County, with a small portion extending south into Calumet County along State Highway 55 (Friendship Drive). According to the United States Census Bureau, the city has a total area of 8.06 square miles (20.88 km^{2}), of which 7.66 square miles (19.84 km^{2}) is land and 0.40 square miles (1.04 km^{2}) is water.

The city is divided into the North Side and South Side by the Fox River, which is spanned by four bridges.

== Climate ==
Kaukauna

Climate chart (precipitation, max. and min. temperature)
J	F	M	A	M	J	J	A	S	O	N	D
70 −8 −15	76 −7 −12	82 3 −5	132 16 3	116 21 8	127 25 14	104 28 17	104 28 18	83 23 13	125 14 5	76 7 −2	65 −5 −9
- █ Average max. and min. temperatures in °C
- █ Precipitation totals in mm
Imperial conversion
J	F	M	A	M	J	J	A	S	O	N	D
2.8 18 5	3 19 10	3.2 37 23	5.2 61 37	4.6 70 46	5 77 57	4.1 82 63	4.1 82 64	3.3 73 55	4.9 57 41	3 45 28	2.6 23 16
- █ Average max. and min. temperatures in °F
- █ Precipitation totals in inches

== Demographics ==
Historical population
Census	Pop.	Note	%±
1880	834		—
1890	4,667		459.6%
1900	5,115		9.6%
1910	4,717		−7.8%
1920	5,951		26.2%
1930	6,581		10.6%
1940	7,382		12.2%
1950	8,337		12.9%
1960	10,096		21.1%
1970	11,308		12.0%
1980	11,310		0.0%
1990	11,982		5.9%
2000	12,983		8.4%
2010	15,462		19.1%
2020	17,089		10.5%
U.S. Decennial Census

=== 2020 census ===
As of the 2020 census, Kaukauna had a population of 17,089. The median age was 37.4 years. 23.8% of residents were under the age of 18 and 15.9% of residents were 65 years of age or older. For every 100 females there were 100.0 males, and for every 100 females age 18 and over there were 96.9 males age 18 and over.

99.9% of residents lived in urban areas, while 0.1% lived in rural areas.

There were 6,833 households in Kaukauna, of which 31.3% had children under the age of 18 living in them. Of all households, 48.5% were married-couple households, 18.7% were households with a male householder and no spouse or partner present, and 22.8% were households with a female householder and no spouse or partner present. About 27.6% of all households were made up of individuals and 10.7% had someone living alone who was 65 years of age or older.

There were 7,057 housing units, of which 3.2% were vacant. The homeowner vacancy rate was 0.5% and the rental vacancy rate was 4.0%.

Racial composition as of the 2020 census
Race	Number	Percent
White	15,377	90.0%
Black or African American	186	1.1%
American Indian and Alaska Native	143	0.8%
Asian	221	1.3%
Native Hawaiian and Other Pacific Islander	3	0.0%
Some other race	233	1.4%
Two or more races	926	5.4%
Hispanic or Latino (of any race)	657	3.8%

=== 2010 census ===
As of the census of 2010, there were 15,462 people, 6,270 households, and 4,090 families living in the city. The population density was 2,018.5 inhabitants per square mile (779.3/km^{2}). There were 6,596 housing units at an average density of 861.1 per square mile (332.5/km^{2}). The racial makeup of the city was 94.5% White, 0.7% African American, 0.8% Native American, 1.3% Asian, 1.0% from other races, and 1.6% from two or more races. Hispanic or Latino of any race were 2.6% of the population.

There were 6,270 households, of which 33.9% had children under the age of 18 living with them, 50.2% were married couples living together, 10.3% had a female householder with no husband present, 4.8% had a male householder with no wife present, and 34.8% were non-families. 27.9% of all households were made up of individuals, and 10.6% had someone living alone who was 65 years of age or older. The average household size was 2.45 and the average family size was 3.01.

The median age in the city was 34.6 years. 25.8% of residents were under the age of 18; 8.3% were between the ages of 18 and 24; 29.5% were from 25 to 44; 24.2% were from 45 to 64; and 12.2% were 65 years of age or older. The gender makeup of the city was 49.5% male and 50.5% female.

=== 2000 census ===
As of the census of 2000, there were 12,983 people, 4,971 households, and 3,365 families living in the city. The population density was 2,092.5 people per square mile (808.5/km^{2}). There were 5,142 housing units at an average density of 320.2 persons/km^{2} (828.8 persons/sq mi). The racial makeup of the city was 95.48% White, 0.27% African American, 0.75% Native American, 2.22% Asian, 0.07% Pacific Islander, 0.30% from other races, and 0.91% from two or more races. 0.79% of the population were Hispanic or Latino of any race.

There were 4,971 households, out of which 35.5% had children under the age of 18 living with them, 55.0% were married couples living together, 8.7% have a woman whose husband does not live with her, and 32.3% were non-families. 26.6% of all households were made up of individuals, and 12.3% had someone living alone who was 65 years of age or older. The average household size was 2.57 and the average family size was 3.16.

In the city, the population was spread out, with 27.7% under the age of 18, 8.6% from 18 to 24, 30.5% from 25 to 44, 19.4% from 45 to 64, and 13.7% who were 65 years of age or older. The median age was 35 years. For every 100 females, there were 97.0 males. For every 100 females age 18 and over, there were 94.4 males.

The median income for a household in the city was $43,980, and the median income for a family was $50,187. Males had a median income of $38,880 versus $22,830 for females. The per capita income for the city was $18,748. 4.8% of the population and 2.6% of families were below the poverty line. Out of the total people living in poverty, 4.6% are under the age of 18 and 10.4% are 65 or older.

== Transportation ==
Kaukauna is located at the intersections of several major roads. Interstate 41, which forms the backbone of the Fox Cities' transit network, runs along the northern edge of the city and intersects Wisconsin Highway 55, Wisconsin Highway 96, and two county roads that serve as major thoroughfares in the city. US 10 is just to the south of Kaukauna, and Wisconsin Highway 441 is just to the west. Kaukauna is a member of Valley Transit, which provides a bus service. Kaukauna is served by Appleton International Airport for airport service.

== Economy ==
The city has diverse industrial and manufacturing businesses, including the Oscar Thilmany Paper Mill, constructed in 1883. The name dropped off the mill when it was purchased by HammerMill in 1969, which was in turn bought by International Paper in 1986.

In 2005, New York-based equity firm Kohlberg & Company bought the mill, changed the name back to Thilmany, and created a company of the same name. It is now owned by KPS Capital Partners, and was renamed Expera Specialty Solutions in 2013. In 2018, it was sold to Ahlstrom-Munksjo. Kaukauna cheese, once made in the city, is now manufactured by the Bel/Kaukauna corporation in the neighboring village of Little Chute.

== Education ==
Kaukauna is served by the Kaukauna Area School District, whose enrollment totals almost 4,000 students between kindergarten and 12th grade. There are four public elementary schools, one middle school, and Kaukauna High School. Two parochial schools for children through the eighth grade exist in Kaukauna: St. Ignatius Catholic school and Trinity Lutheran School. One parochial high school exists in Kaukauna, affiliated with St Ignatius Catholic school: St Ignatius Chesterton Academy.

== National Register of Historic Places ==
Locations in Kaukauna that are listed on the National Register of Historic Places:

- Capt. Matthew J. Meade House
- Charles A. Grignon House
- Charles W. Stribley House
- Fargo's Furniture Store
- Former United States Post Office
- Frank St. Andrews House
- Free Public Library of Kaukauna
- Holy Cross Church
- Julius J. Martens Company Building
- Kaukauna Locks Historic District
- Klein Dairy Farmhouse
- Kuehn Blacksmith Shop-Hardware Store
- Lindauer and Rupert Block
- Merritt Black House
- Nicolet Public School
- Norman Brokaw House
- St. Mary's Catholic Church

== Notable people ==
- Thomas Armstrong, Wisconsin State Representative
- Steve Badger, professional poker player
- Annastasia Batikis, baseball player
- Mark Belling, conservative talk-show host
- Thomas Cane, Chief Judge of the Wisconsin Court of Appeals
- Elizabeth Dayton, author and poet
- Eugene DeBruin, American pilot, MIA in the Vietnam War
- William J. Gantter, Wisconsin State Representative
- Augustin Grignon, fur trader and businessman
- Norbert Hayes, NFL player
- Ric Killian, North Carolina politician
- Jordan McCabe, Athlete & Internet Personality
- Lee Meyerhofer, Wisconsin State Representative
- Gordon Myse, Judge of the Wisconsin Court of Appeals
- Arnold C. Otto, Wisconsin State Representative
- Peter Philipps, Wisconsin State Representative
- Gary J. Schmidt, Wisconsin State Representative
- Red Smith, NFL and MLB player
- William N. Vander Loop, Wisconsin State Representative
- David Viaene, NFL player
