= Appleton City Park Historic District =

Historic district in Wisconsin, United States

- U.S. National Register of Historic Places
- U.S. Historic district
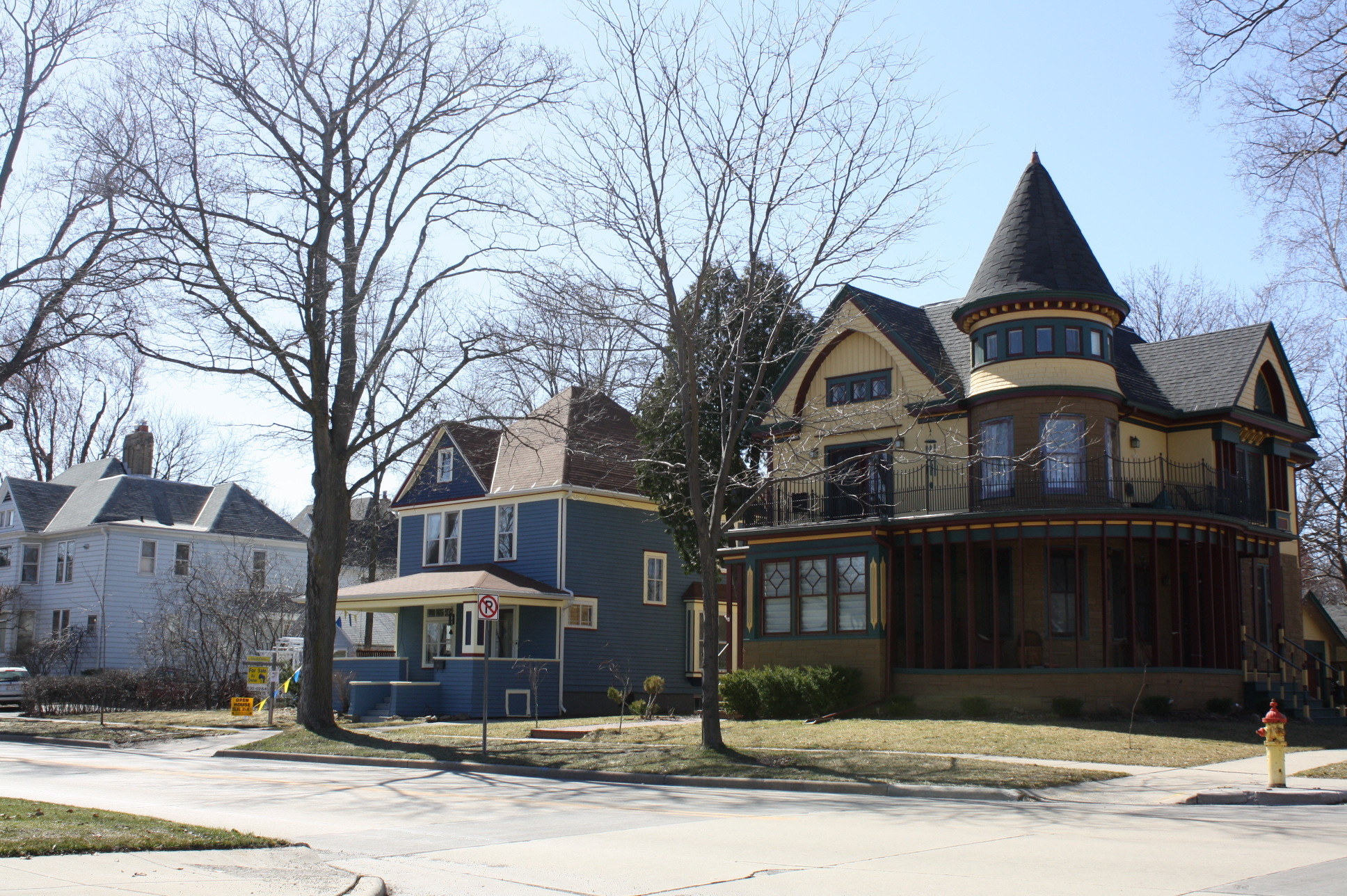
- Houses in the Appleton City Park Historic District at the corner of Lawe Street and Eldorado Street.
- Location: Appleton, Wisconsin
- Coordinates: 44.26489°N 88.39965°W
- Architectural style: Queen Anne
- NRHP reference No.: 02001213
- Added to NRHP: October 25, 2002

Appleton City Park Historic District is a mostly-residential historic district in Appleton, Wisconsin containing 141 contributing properties built from 1867 to 1949. It was added to the National Register of Historic Places in 2002 for its architectural significance.
