= St. Mary's Catholic Church (Kaukauna, Wisconsin) =

Historic church in Wisconsin, United States

- U.S. National Register of Historic Places
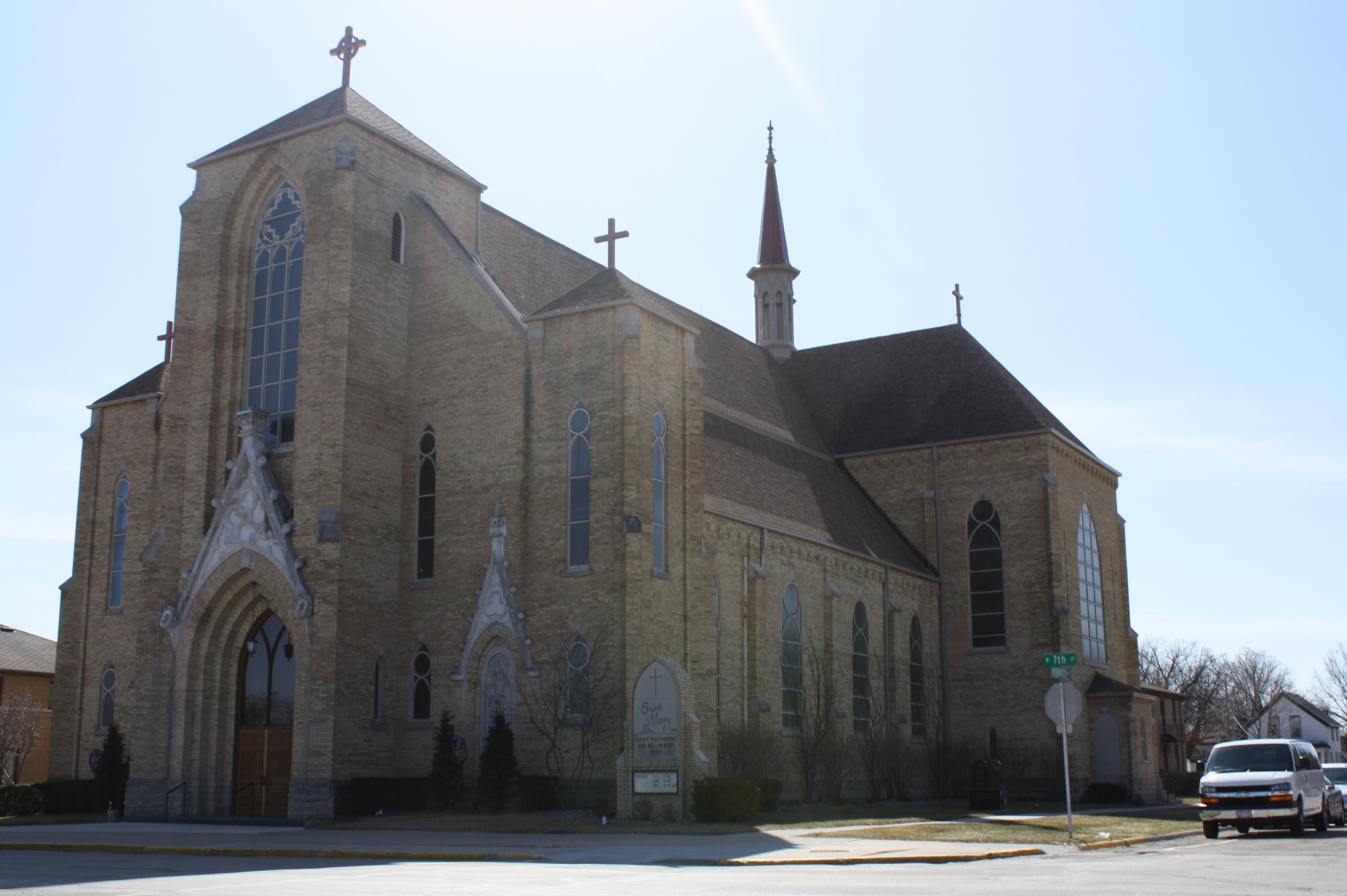
- St. Mary's Catholic Church
- Location: 119 W. 7th St. Kaukauna, Wisconsin
- Coordinates: 44.2743°N 88.2765°W
- Built: 1898
- Architectural style: Neo-Gothic/Ecclesiastical
- NRHP reference No.: 84003769
- Added to NRHP: March 29, 1984

St. Mary's Catholic Church is a Roman Catholic church in Kaukauna, Wisconsin. It was added to the National Register of Historic Places in 1984 for its significance in architecture and community planning and development.
