= Free Public Library of Kaukauna =

- U.S. National Register of Historic Places
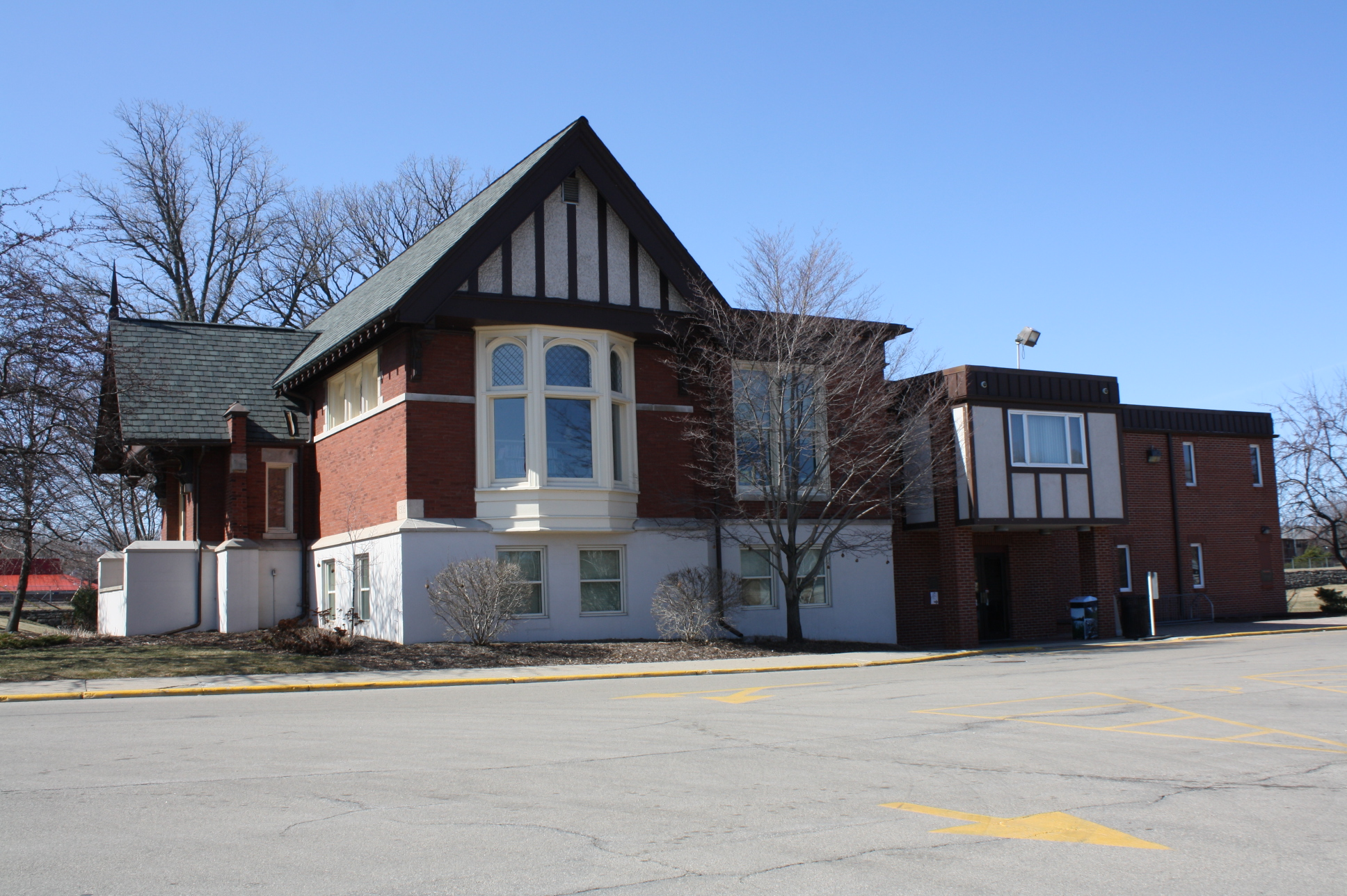
- The Free Public Library of Kaukauna

- Location within Wisconsin Location within the United States
- Location: 111 Main Ave., Kaukauna, Wisconsin
- Coordinates: 44°16′47″N 88°16′14″W
- Area: less than one acre
- Built: 1933
- Architect/builder: Claude & Starck
- Architectural style: Prairie School
- MPS: Kaukauna MRA
- NRHP reference No.: 84003756
- Added to NRHP: March 29, 1984

The Free Public Library of Kaukauna is affiliated with the Outagamie Waupaca Library System. It was added to the National Register of Historic Places in 1984 for its significance in education and community planning and development.
