= Menominee Tribe of Indians v. United States =

- Supreme Court of the United States

Argued January 22, 1968 Reargued April 26, 1968 Decided May 27, 1968
- Full case name: Menominee Tribe of Indians v. United States
- Citations: 391 U.S. 404 (more) 88 S. Ct. 1705, 20 L. Ed. 697; 1968 U.S. LEXIS 1550

Case history
- Prior: Menominee Tribe of Indians v. United States, 388 F.2d 998 (Ct. Cl. 1967); cert. granted, 389 U.S. 811 (1967).

Holding
- Tribal hunting and fishing rights retained by treaty were not abrogated by the Menominee Termination Act without a clear and unequivocal statement to that effect by Congress

Court membership
- Chief Justice Earl Warren Associate Justices Hugo Black · William O. Douglas; John M. Harlan II · William J. Brennan Jr. Potter Stewart · Byron White; Abe Fortas · Thurgood Marshall

Case opinions
- Majority: Douglas, joined by Warren, Harlan, Brennan, White, Fortas
- Dissent: Stewart, joined by Black
- Marshall took no part in the consideration or decision of the case.

Laws applied
- 10 Stat. 1064 (1854), 25 U.S.C. §§ 891–902, 18 U.S.C. § 1162

Menominee Tribe of Indians v. United States, 391 U.S. 404 (1968), is a case in which the Supreme Court ruled that the Menominee Indian Tribe kept their historical hunting and fishing rights even after the federal government ceased to recognize the tribe. It was a landmark decision in Native American case law.

The Menominee Indian Tribe had entered into a series of treaties with the United States that did not specifically state that they had hunting and fishing rights. In 1961, Congress terminated the tribe's federal recognition, ending its right to govern itself, federal support of health care and education programs, police and fire protection, and tribal rights to land. In 1963, three members of the tribe were charged with violating Wisconsin's hunting and fishing laws on land which had been a reservation for over 100 years. The tribe members were acquitted, but when the state appealed, the Wisconsin Supreme Court held that the Menominee tribe no longer had hunting and fishing rights because of the termination action by Congress.

The tribe sued the United States for compensation in the US Court of Claims, which ruled that tribal members still had hunting and fishing rights and that Congress had not abrogated the rights. The opposite rulings by the state and federal courts brought the issue to the Supreme Court. In 1968, the Supreme Court held that the tribe retained its hunting and fishing rights under the treaties involved and the rights were not lost after federal recognition was ended by the Menominee Indian Termination Act without a clear and unequivocal statement by Congress removing the rights.

== Background ==
=== Early treaties ===
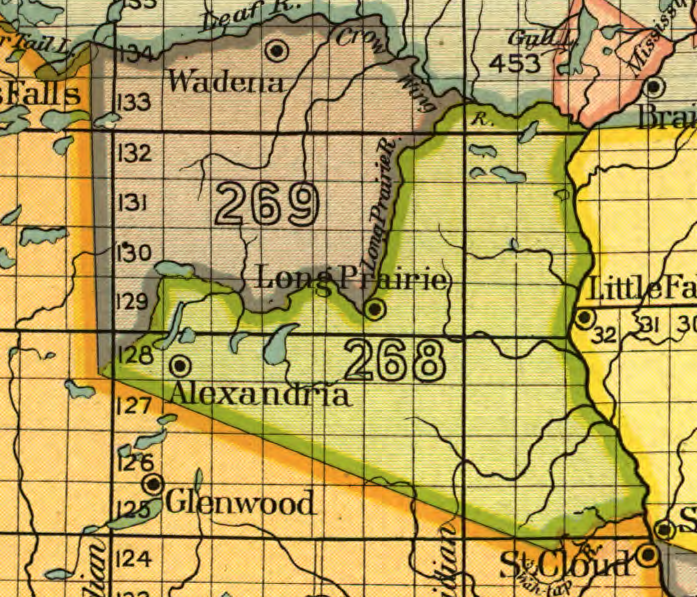
The Crow Wing River area, showing part of the proposed Menominee reservation (area 269)

Ancestors of the Menominee Indian Tribe may have lived in the states of Wisconsin and Michigan for the last 10,000 years. (Note: "Anthropologists have surmised that the Menominee, an Algonquian-speaking tribe, may have been in the Wisconsin territory as far back as 10,000 years ago.") Their traditional territory was about 10 million acres (4 million hectares). They first acknowledged that they were under the protection of the United States in the Treaty of St. Louis (1817). In 1825 and 1827, the treaties of Prairie du Chien and Butte des Morts answered boundary questions. None of the early treaties addressed hunting and fishing rights. In 1831, the tribe entered into the Treaty of Washington, which ceded about 3,000,000 acres (1,200,000 ha) to the federal government. These two treaties reserved hunting and fishing rights for the tribe on the ceded land until the President of the United States ordered the land surveyed and sold to settlers. In 1836, the tribe entered into the Treaty of Cedar Point, under which 4,184,000 acres (1,693,000 ha) were ceded to the federal government. The treaty did not mention hunting or fishing rights.

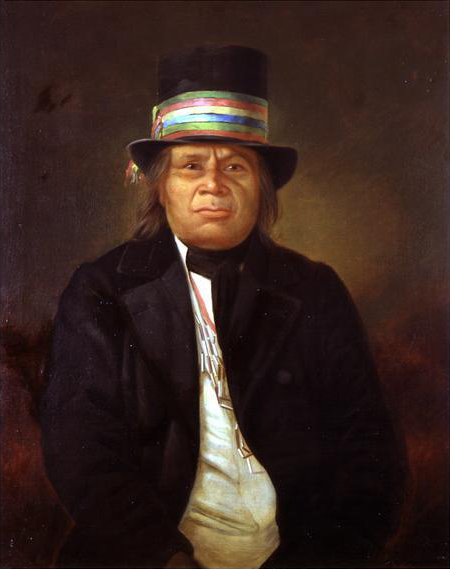
Menominee Chief Oshkosh

In 1848, the tribe entered into another treaty with the United States, the Treaty of Lake Poygan, which ceded the tribe's remaining approximately 4,000,000 acres (1,600,000 ha) in exchange for 600,000 acres (240,000 ha) west of the Mississippi River in present-day Minnesota. This treaty was contingent on the tribe examining the land proposed for them and accepting it as suitable. In 1850, Chief Oshkosh led a delegation to the Crow Wing area and determined that the land was not suitable for the tribe, mainly because the proposed reservation was located between two warring tribes, the Dakota (Note: The Dakota Indians are a sub-group of what is commonly known as the Sioux tribe.) and Ojibwe. (Note: Commonly known as the Chippewa tribe.) Oshkosh then pressed for a new treaty, stating that he "preferred a home somewhere in Wisconsin, for the poorest region in Wisconsin was better than the Crow Wing."

=== Treaty of 1854 ===
The tribe had been living in an area near the Wolf River. They entered into the Treaty of Wolf River with the United States in 1854. The United States set aside 276,480 acres (111,890 ha) of land for a reservation in present-day Menominee County, Wisconsin. In return, the tribe ceded the land in Minnesota back to the federal government. None of the previous treaties except the Treaty of Washington addressed the tribe's retained hunting and fishing rights, but stated that the reservation was "to be held as Indian lands are held".

Since the Treaty of Wolf River, this area has been the tribe's home, and they were free from state taxation, regulation and court jurisdiction. (Note: As an Indian tribe, the state has no authority to tax or regulate reservation land, nor to have any court jurisdiction over Indians on reservation land. This is exclusively reserved to the federal government.) Of the original land, 230,000 acres (93,000 ha) of prime timberland remained under the tribe's control, while the remaining land was transferred to the Mahican and Lenape (the latter also known as the Delaware or Munsee) tribes. (Note: Commonly known as the Stockbridge-Munsee tribe, residing on the Stockbridge-Munsee Indian Reservation directly adjacent to the Menominee Reservation. These two tribal groups united prior to their arrival in Wisconsin.) During this period, the Menominee enjoyed complete freedom to regulate hunting and fishing on the reservation, with the acquiescence of Wisconsin.

=== Tribal termination ===
In the mid- to late-1940s, the Menominee tribe was considered by a government survey to identify tribes for termination, a process in which federal recognition of the tribe would be withdrawn and the tribe would no longer be dependent on the Bureau of Indian Affairs (BIA) to support them. The Menominee were thought to be a tribe that could be terminated because they were one of the richest tribes in the nation. The federal government thought that termination would allow the tribal members to be assimilated into mainstream American culture, becoming hard-working, tax-paying, productive citizens. In 1954, Congress terminated the federally recognized status of the tribe with the Menominee Indian Termination Act. According to the terms of the Termination Act, the federally recognized status was to end in 1958. The tribe and the state of Wisconsin successfully lobbied for a delay in the implementation of termination until 1961. The tribe was opposed to termination for a number of reasons; their concerns included the loss of tribal culture, the loss of land due to tax liens, the possibility of bankruptcy and loss of the tribal timber industry, and the lack of tribal members who were trained to run a county government. The state of Wisconsin was concerned that with no industry for the tribe to tax, the state would be responsible for the large financial outlay that would be required to maintain governmental operations for the former reservation.

On termination, the Menominee, which was one of the wealthiest tribes prior to termination, became one of the poorest. In 1954, the tribe's timber operations allowed it to be self-sufficient. (Note: Although the tribe owned the lumber operation and sawmill, these were managed by the BIA, with no tribal members being allowed in management positions.) The tribe, which owned utility companies, paid for a hospital, BIA salaries, local schools, and a stipend to tribal members. The tribe was forced to use its reserve funds to develop a termination plan that they did not want and instead of having a reserve, they entered into termination with a $300,000 deficit. Menominee County was created out of the old reservation boundaries and the tribe immediately had to finance its own police and fire protection. Without federal support and with no tax base, the situation became dire. The tribe closed the hospital, sold its utility company, and contracted those services to neighboring counties. The Menominee Enterprises, Inc., formed to care for the tribe's needs after termination, was unable to pay property taxes and began to consider selling off tribal property. Many Menominee tribal members believed that the sponsor of the termination bill, Senator Arthur Wilkins of Utah, intended to force the loss of rich tribal lands to non-Indians. In 1962, the state of Wisconsin took the position that the hunting and fishing rights were abrogated by the termination act and that the tribal members were subject to state hunting and fishing regulations. With the poverty in the former reservation, the loss of hunting rights meant the loss of one of their last remaining means of survival.

=== State enforcement actions ===
In 1962, tribal members Joseph L. Sanapaw, William J. Grignon, and Francis Basina were charged with violating state hunting and fishing regulations. All three admitted to the acts in open court, but claimed that the Wolf River Treaty gave them the right to hunt. The state trial court agreed and acquitted the three. The state was given leave to pursue a writ of error and appealed to the Wisconsin Supreme Court to answer whether the Termination Act canceled those rights retained by treaty.

The Wisconsin Supreme Court in State v. Sanapaw held that the treaty rights were terminated by Congress. In analyzing the case, the Wisconsin Supreme Court first had to determine whether the tribe had hunting and fishing rights under treaties with the United States. It found that although the Wolf River Treaty did not specifically mention hunting and fishing rights, the term "to be held as Indian lands are held" was clear. Indians have always been able to hunt and fish on their own land, and if a term in a treaty with Indians is ambiguous, the Wisconsin Supreme Court found that it must be resolved in favor of the tribe. Since the tribe originally had hunting and fishing rights under the treaty, the Wisconsin Supreme Court then looked to determine whether Congress had removed those rights by enacting the Menominee Termination Act. The Wisconsin Supreme Court held that Congress had used its plenary power to abrogate those rights.

The Wisconsin Supreme Court placed special emphasis on the phrase "all statutes of the United States which affect Indians because of their status as Indians shall no longer be applicable to the members of the tribe, and the laws of the several States shall apply to the tribe and its members in the same manner as they apply to other citizens or persons within their jurisdiction." The Wisconsin Supreme Court held that the latter section was controlling, despite the tribal members' argument that hunting rights were retained by treaty rather than by statute. The Wisconsin Supreme Court held that the tribe had lost their hunting and fishing rights. The tribal members appealed to the U.S. Supreme Court, which declined to hear the appeal.

=== Federal Court of Claims ===
The Menominee (Note: The plaintiffs included the Menominee tribe, Menominee Enterprises Inc., four tribal members, and the First Wisconsin Trust Co. (as trustee for the trust established by the termination act).) sued in the U.S. Court of Claims to recover compensation for the loss of their hunting and fishing rights. The Court of Claims first clarified that the Menominee Termination Act did not abolish the tribe or its membership, but merely ended federal supervision of the tribe. Since the Menominee was still a tribe, although not one under federal trusteeship, the tribe had a right to assert a claim arising out of the Wolf River Treaty in accordance with the Indian Claims Commission Act and the Tucker Act.

The Court of Claims looked at whether the tribe had hunting and fishing rights and drew the same conclusion as the Wisconsin Supreme Court—that the terms of the treaty had to be resolved in the favor of the tribe, citing The Menominee Tribe of Indians v. United States, 95 Ct.Cl. 232 (Ct.Cl., 1941). In that decision, the Court of Claims had observed that the reason the tribe had agreed to the site of the reservation was that it was well suited for hunting, with plenty of game. The hunting rights by treaty were therefore confirmed.

The Court of Claims had to determine whether the Menominee Termination Act had taken away that right. If it had, the tribe would have a valid claim for compensation; but if not, then there would be no compensation. On April 14, 1967, the Court of Claims denied the claim, stating that the hunting and fishing rights had not been abrogated by the Termination Act. In arriving at this decision, it said that the legislative history included two witnesses who stated that the Act would not affect hunting and fishing rights acquired by treaty, but would abrogate any such rights acquired by statute. Additionally, the Court of Claims observed that Congress also amended Public Law 280 so that Indian hunting and fishing rights were protected in Wisconsin. The decision contradicted the decision of the Wisconsin Supreme Court.

On October 9, 1967, the U.S. Supreme Court agreed to hear the appeal and granted certiorari (a writ to the lower court to send the case to them for review) to resolve the conflict between the Wisconsin Supreme Court and the federal Court of Claims.

== Supreme Court ==
=== Argument ===
In most appeals, the parties argue opposing positions. In this case, both the appellee (the Menominee) and the appellant (the United States) argued that the decision of the Court of Claims should be affirmed. The State of Wisconsin, as amicus curiae, argued that the Court of Claims ruling should be reversed.

The tribe was represented by Charles A. Hobbs of Washington, D.C. The tribe argued that the Menominee Termination Act did not extinguish treaty rights, but instead had two purposes; to terminate federal supervision of the tribe and to transfer to the state general criminal and civil jurisdiction—which had already been accomplished by Public Law 280 and that law expressly preserved hunting and fishing rights. In the event that the court would decide that the hunting and fishing rights were extinguished, then the tribe should receive compensation for the loss of the rights.

The United States was represented by Louis F. Claiborne, assistant to the U.S. Solicitor General. The United States also argued that the Menominee Termination Act did not extinguish hunting and fishing rights under the 1854 treaty and therefore the tribe was not due compensation from the United States. Claiborne also argued that whatever regulatory rights which were held by the federal government were transferred to the state of Wisconsin by the termination act.

The case was originally argued on January 22, 1968. During oral argument, some of the justices were concerned that the state of Wisconsin was not a party to the case. Following oral arguments, the court called for reargument and requested that Wisconsin present an oral argument in addition to the brief it had filed with the court. Justice Marshall recused himself from the case, as he had been the U.S. Solicitor General the previous year and had participated in the government's preparation of the case. (Note: Justice Marshall recused himself from all 98 cases in the 1967-68 term in which the government was a party.)

=== Reargument ===
On April 25, 1968, the case was reargued. The tribe was again represented by Hobbs, who made the same basic argument that the hunting and fishing rights were not extinguished. The state of Wisconsin was represented by Bronson La Follette, the Attorney General of Wisconsin. La Follette argued that the plain language of the termination act not only ended federal supervision of the tribe, but extinguished the tribe and with it all treaty rights. He argued that the Court of Claims ruling was incorrect and should be reversed, and that the tribe was due compensation from the federal government. The United States was again represented by Claiborne, who reiterated his earlier argument.

=== Opinion of the court ===
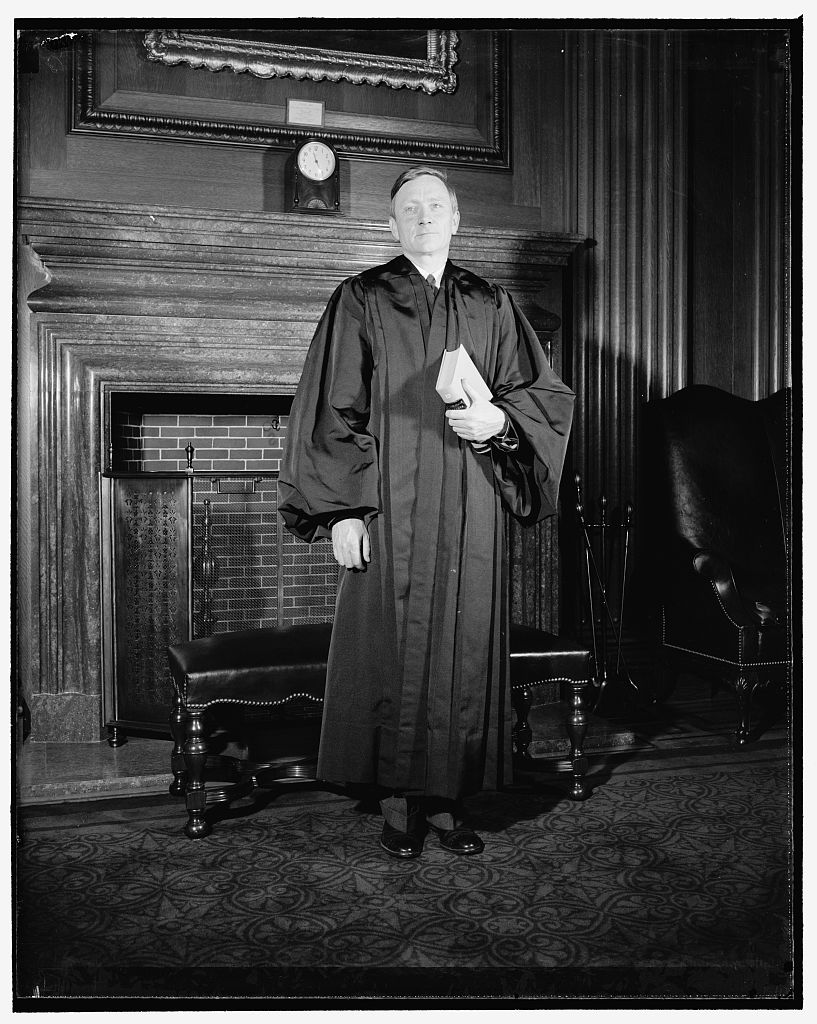
Justice William O. Douglas, author of the majority opinion

Justice William O. Douglas delivered the opinion of the court. In a 6-2 decision, the ruling of the U.S. Court of Claims was affirmed, ruling that the tribe retained its hunting and fishing rights under the treaty. Douglas noted that Public Law 280 had been enacted and was fully in force for approximately seven years before the Termination Act became effective. The section of that law that dealt with Wisconsin provided that hunting and fishing rights in "Indian Country" were protected from state regulation and action. Thus from 1954 until termination in 1961, the Menominee's hunting and fishing rights were not interfered with by Wisconsin. The Termination Act stated that all federal statutes dealing with the tribe were no longer in force, but Douglas noted that it was silent with regard to treaties. The act did not specifically address the hunting and fishing rights, and Douglas stated that the U.S. Supreme Court would "decline to construe the Termination Act as a backhanded way of abrogating the hunting and fishing rights of these Indians." He noted that in a similar bill for the Klamath Tribe, there was a discussion on paying the tribe to buy out their hunting and fishing rights, a clear indication that Congress was aware of the implications. Douglas found it hard to believe that Congress would subject the United States to a claim for compensation without an explicit statement to that effect. He found that without a specific abrogation of those rights, the tribe retained those rights.

=== Dissent ===
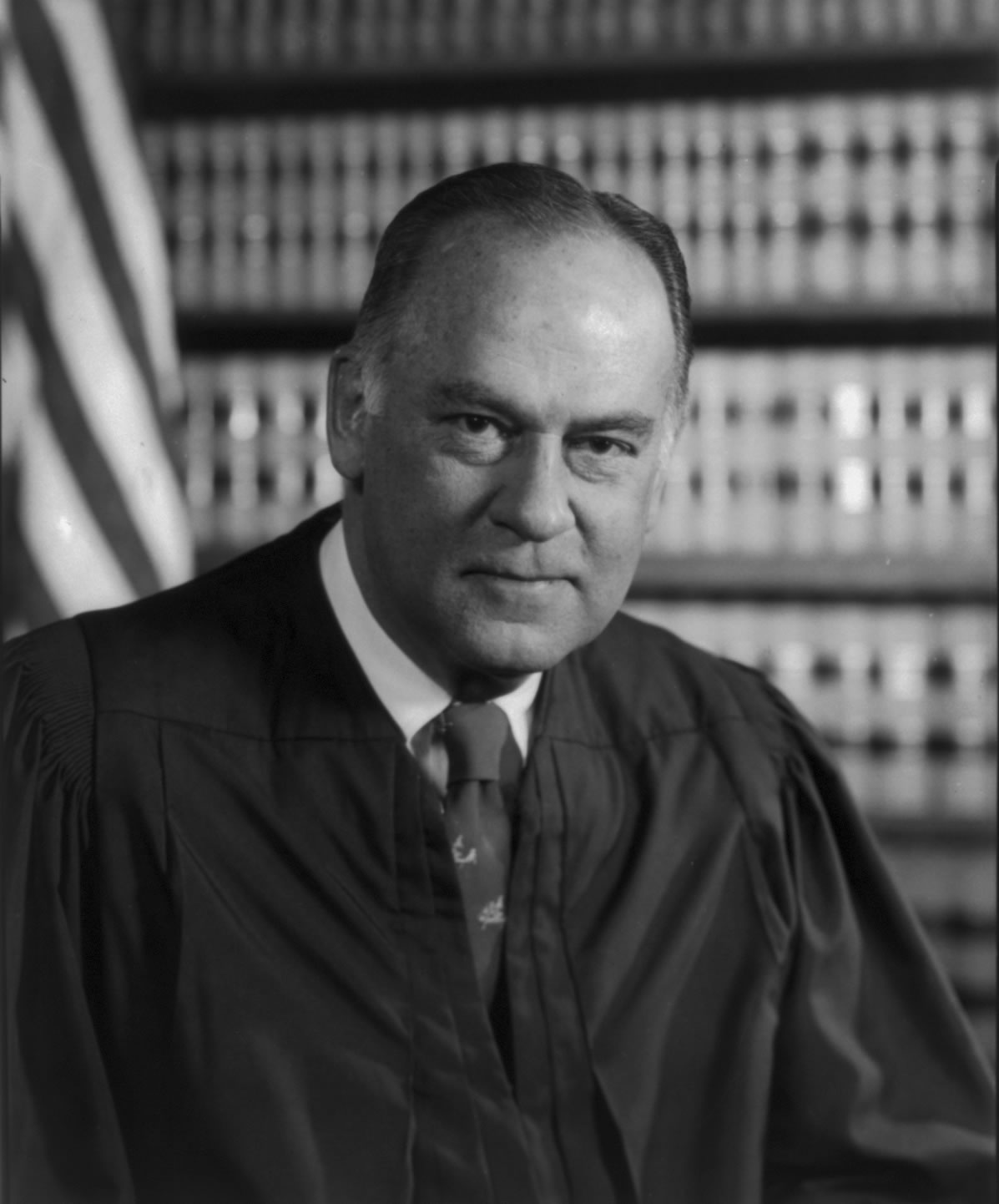
Justice Potter Stewart, author of the dissenting opinion

Justice Potter Stewart, joined by Justice Hugo Black, dissented. Stewart acknowledged that the Wolf River Treaty unquestionably conferred hunting and fishing rights on the tribe and its members. He stated that the Termination Act subjected the members of the tribe to the same laws that all other citizens of Wisconsin were held to, including hunting and fishing regulations. In Stewart's opinion, Public Law 280 had no bearing on the case and the rights were not protected by the Termination Act, so they were lost. Stewart did note that this would have also made the claim for compensation valid under Shoshone Tribe v. United States, regardless of whether Congress intended it or not. He would have reversed the decision of the Court of Claims.

== Subsequent developments ==
Menominee Tribe v. United States is a landmark case in Native American law, primarily in the area of reserved tribal rights. It has been used in college courses to explain tribal sovereignty rights and that tribes retain some rights even if the tribe has been terminated, as the Menominee tribe was. The decision in the case has affected subsequent legislation, such as the Alaska Native Claims Settlement Act, in which Congress expressly extinguished all aboriginal rights. The case has been discussed internationally, for example in Australia regarding the relevance of indigenous or aboriginal title.

=== Law reviews and journals ===
The case has been cited in over 300 law review articles as of October 2013. A consistent point made in numerous articles is that while Congress may terminate tribal and treaty rights, it must show a "specific intent to abrogate them." It is repeatedly cited by cases and law reviews to show that the court will construe laws and treaties, where ambiguous, in favor of the tribes. Judges and legal experts have noted that hunting and fishing rights are valuable property rights, and if the government takes away such rights, it must compensate those who hold the rights for their loss.

Courts must also construe treaty rights and statutes liberally in favor of the Indians, even when the treaty does not specifically speak of hunting and fishing.

=== Restoration of federal recognition ===
In 1973, Congress repealed termination and restored federal recognition of the Menominee tribe. The Menominee Restoration Act was signed by Richard Nixon; it repealed the Menominee Indian Termination Act, reopened the tribal rolls, re-established the trust status and provided for the reformation of tribal government. The tribe was the first terminated tribe to be restored to trust and recognition status. The Restoration Act signaled the end of the termination era.

== See also ==
- Menominee Tribe of Wis. v. United States: A 2016 U.S. Supreme Court decision
