= Erasmus Hall =

Erasmus Hall may refer to:

- Erasmus Hall High School in Flatbush, Brooklyn
- Erasmus D. Hall, merchant and legislator from Wisconsin
