= Darwin Hall =

American politician (1844–1919)

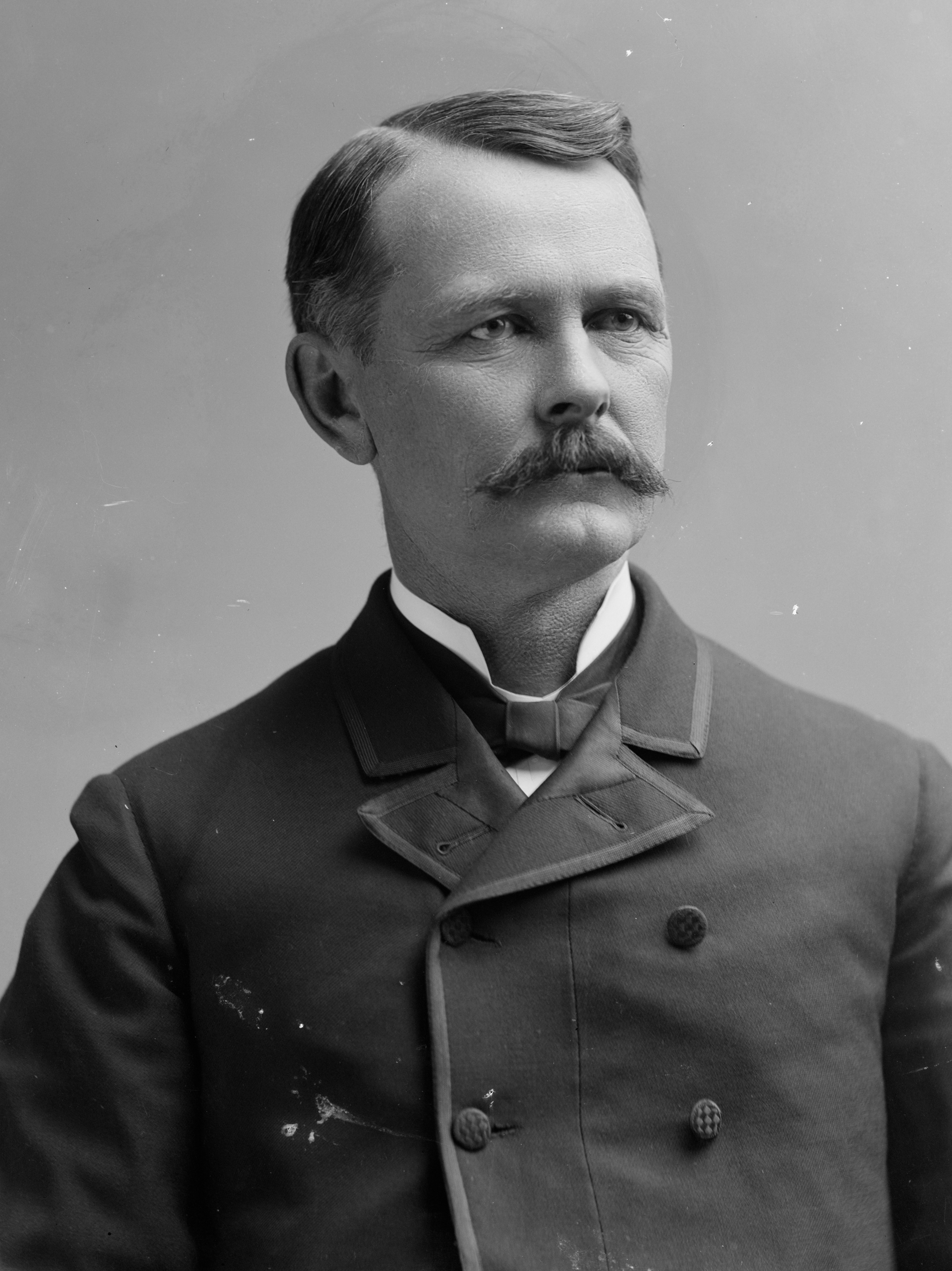
- Hall c. 1890

Member of the U.S. House of Representatives from Minnesota's 3rd district
- In office March 4, 1889 – March 3, 1891
- Preceded by: John L. MacDonald
- Succeeded by: Osee M. Hall

Personal details
- Born: January 23, 1844 Wheatland, Kenosha County, Wisconsin, U.S.
- Died: February 23, 1919 (aged 75) Olivia, Minnesota, U.S.
- Resting place: Olivia Cemetery, Olivia, Minnesota
- Party: Republican
- Parents: Erasmus D. Hall (father); Mary Ann Carson (mother)

Military service
- Allegiance: United States
- Branch/service: United States Army; Union Army
- Years of service: 1864–1865
- Rank: Private, USV
- Unit: 42nd Reg. Wis. Vol. Infantry
- Battles/wars: American Civil War

Darwin Scott Hall (January 23, 1844 – February 23, 1919) was an American Republican politician who served one term in the United States House of Representatives, representing Minnesota's 3rd congressional district. He also served in the Minnesota Legislature.

== Biography ==
Hall was born in Mound Prairie, in the town of Wheatland, Kenosha County, Wisconsin, on January 23, 1844. Darwin was the son of Erasmus D. Hall, who served in the first session of the Wisconsin State Assembly.

Darwin moved with his parents to Waukau, Wisconsin, in Winnebago County, and in 1847 moved to Grand Rapids, Wisconsin. In 1856 Darwin attended the common schools being the local academy at Elgin, Illinois, and Markham Academy in Milwaukee. While at Milwaukee, Hall enlisted as a private in Company K of the 42nd Wisconsin Infantry Regiment for service in the American Civil War. The 42nd Wisconsin Infantry mustered into service in August 1864 and was assigned to Cairo, Illinois, to guard supply routes against guerillas in southern Illinois and western Kentucky. They saw no combat and mustered out in June 1865, following the end of the war.

In 1866 Darwin settled near Birch Coulee, Renville County, Minnesota, and engaged in agricultural pursuits until 1868. He was auditor of Renville County from 1869 – 1873; clerk of the district court from 1873 – 1878; member of the Minnesota House of Representatives in 1876, and editor of the Renville Times, which he founded in 1876.

Darwin's parents both died in 1878 of yellow fever in Ocean Springs, Mississippi.

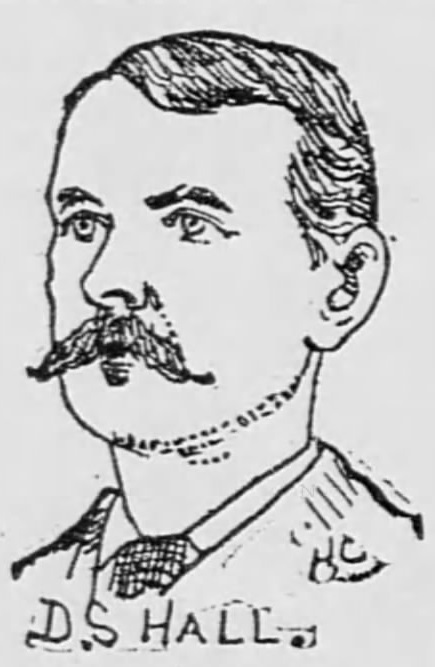
From the Saint Paul Globe, June 29, 1888

He was registered at the United States land office at Benson, Minnesota, from 1878 – 1886 and served in the Minnesota Senate in 1886. He became elected as a Republican to the 51st congress, from March 4, 1889 – March 3, 1891 and was not reelected in 1890 to the 52nd congress. Darwin went on to be appointed chairman of the Chippewa Indian Commission by President Benjamin Harrison in 1891 and served until 1893, and again in 1897. He was also delegate to the Republican National Convention in 1892 and a member of the board of managers of the Minnesota State Agricultural Society from 1905 – 1910, and again a member of the state senate in 1906. He was engaged in agricultural pursuits near Olivia, Renville County, Minnesota, until his death there on February 23, 1919; interment in Olivia Cemetery.

== Sources ==
- Minnesota Legislators Past and Present
- United States Congress. "Darwin Hall (id: H000047)". Biographical Directory of the United States Congress.

U.S. House of Representatives
Preceded by John L. MacDonald	Member of the U.S. House of Representatives from Minnesota's 3rd congressional district March 4, 1889 – March 3, 1891	Succeeded by Osee M. Hall
