= Wonder Cave =

Wonder Cave may refer to:

- Wonder Cave (Kromdraai, Gauteng)
- Wonder Cave (Rudolph, Wisconsin)
- Wonder Cave (San Marcos, Texas)
