= Onemile Creek =

Stream in Wisconsin, U.S.

Coordinates: 44°21′25″N 89°49′48″W

Onemile Creek is a stream in the U.S. state of Wisconsin. It is a tributary to Twomile Creek.

Onemile Creek was so named for its distance, one mile (1.6 km) from the original Grand Rapids townsite.
