= Rudolph (town), Wisconsin =

Town of Rudolph
- Town
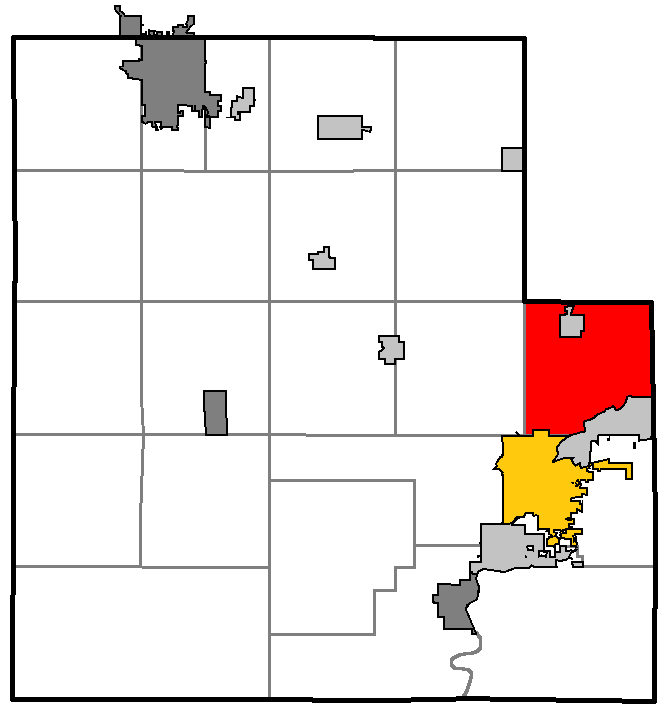
- Location of Rudolph within Wood County

- Location within the state of Wisconsin
- Coordinates: 44°29′46″N 89°48′3″W
- Country: United States
- State: Wisconsin
- County: Wood

Area
  - Total: 29.7 sq mi (77.0 km^{2})
  - Land: 29.7 sq mi (76.9 km^{2})
  - Water: 0.039 sq mi (0.1 km^{2})

Population (2020)
  - Total: 1,027
  - Density: 34.6/sq mi (13.4/km^{2})
- Time zone: UTC-6 (Central (CST))
  - Summer (DST): UTC-5 (CDT)
- Area codes: 715 & 534
- PLSS township: T23N R6E, minus the part south of the Wisconsin River

The Town of Rudolph is located in Wood County, Wisconsin, United States. As of the 2020 census, the town population was 1,027. The Village of Rudolph is located within the town.

== Geography ==
According to the United States Census Bureau, the town has a total area of 29.7 square miles (77.0 km^{2}), of which 29.7 square miles (76.9 km^{2}) is land and 0.04 square mile (0.1 km^{2}) (0.13%) is water.

== History ==
The part of the town within three miles of the Wisconsin River was in the "Indian strip," ceded by the Menominee to the U.S. government in the 1836 Treaty of the Cedars. As such, it was logged and surveyed early. In 1840 a crew working for the U.S. government surveyed that southern half of the six mile square that would become the town of Rudolph, walking through the woods and crossing the river, measuring with chain and compass. When done, the deputy surveyor filed this general description:

Considerable good land on the North East part of this Fractional Township. Extensive(?) Lumbering Establishment of Draper Faytte(?) on sec 34. Apparently Extensive Bog iron ore bed on same section a short distance above said milling Establishment - specimen appears very rich & heavy.

The mill and bog iron were actually on the south side of the river, in what would become Biron.

In 1851 another crew surveyed the section lines of the north half of what would become the town of Rudolph, producing this general description:

Maple & Oak are the prevailing Kinds of Timber in this Township although there is some Pine The creeks & streams of water are mostly fed by swamps and are not durable. the soil is a dark loam with clay sub-soil; there is a great deal of stone in this Township. which decreases its value for farming purposes, the Surface is generally Rolling. though it is not hilly

The town of Rudolph was established in 1856, and named after Frederick Rudolph Hecox, the first white child born within its borders.

== Notable people ==
- D. D. Conway, lawyer and politician, was born in the town of Rudolph

== Demographics ==
As of the census of 2000, there were 1,161 people, 423 households, and 342 families residing in the town. The population density was 39.1 people per square mile (15.1/km^{2}). There were 438 housing units at an average density of 14.8 per square mile (5.7/km^{2}). The racial makeup of the town was 96.90% White, 0.26% Black or African American, 2.50% Asian, and 0.34% from two or more races. 0.43% of the population were Hispanic or Latino of any race.

There were 423 households, out of which 33.6% had children under the age of 18 living with them, 71.6% were married couples living together, 4.5% had a female householder with no husband present, and 19.1% were non-families. 16.3% of all households were made up of individuals, and 7.6% had someone living alone who was 65 years of age or older. The average household size was 2.74 and the average family size was 3.08.

In the town, the population was spread out, with 26.1% under the age of 18, 7.8% from 18 to 24, 26.2% from 25 to 44, 26.3% from 45 to 64, and 13.7% who were 65 years of age or older. The median age was 39 years. For every 100 females, there were 103.7 males. For every 100 females age 18 and over, there were 104.8 males.

The median income for a household in the town was $50,852, and the median income for a family was $53,958. Males had a median income of $41,250 versus $25,833 for females. The per capita income for the town was $20,284. About 4.2% of families and 6.4% of the population were below the poverty line, including 9.2% of those under age 18 and 10.1% of those age 65 or over.
