= Erasmus D. Hall =

American politician (1812–1878)

Member of the Wisconsin State Assembly from the Winnebago district
- In office June 5, 1848 – January 1, 1849
- Preceded by: Position established
- Succeeded by: Thomas J. Townsend

Personal details
- Born: April 12, 1812 Sullivan County, New Hampshire, U.S.
- Died: October 2, 1878 (aged 66) Ocean Springs, Mississippi, U.S.
- Cause of death: Yellow fever
- Resting place: Evergreen Cemetery, Ocean Springs, Mississippi
- Party: Republican; Whig (before 1854)
- Spouse: Mary Ann Carson (m. 1842; died 1878)
- Children: 5, including Darwin

Erasmus Darwin Hall (April 12, 1812 – October 2, 1878) was an American merchant from Wisconsin, who served in the 1st Wisconsin Legislature as a Whig, representing Winnebago County in the Wisconsin State Assembly.

== Biography ==
Hall was a native of Vermont, and came to Wisconsin Territory in 1838. Hall and his wife became among the earliest settlers of the Waukau area, arriving there in 1845 along with other members of Hall's extended family (John M., J. R. and Uriah Hall), and accompanied by their son Darwin Hall. He engaged in "mercantile pursuits".

Hall held various public offices, including being elected the first chairman of the newly organized Town of Rushford, Wisconsin and a frequent member of the county's board of supervisors (1847, 1850, 1853, 1855). In 1848, he was elected as a Whig to the single Assembly seat allocated to Winnebago County. He was succeeded in 1849 by fellow Whig Thomas J. Townsend. In 1856, the Halls moved to Grand Rapids in Wood County, Wisconsin; and later to Milwaukee, where they stayed about five years.

In 1870, the Halls (including a son) moved to Mississippi, intending to plant cotton. After one season, they laid plans to return to Wisconsin, but Hall was offered the position of postmaster of Okolona, Mississippi. Due to health problems, he later moved to Ocean Springs, Mississippi, where in 1878 both of the Halls succumbed to yellow fever. Darwin Hall had already moved to Minnesota, and served in the Minnesota House of Representatives by this time; but his service in the Minnesota Senate and United States House of Representatives took place after their deaths.

Wisconsin State Assembly
State government established	Member of the Wisconsin State Assembly from the Winnebago district June 5, 1848 – January 1, 1849	Succeeded by Thomas J. Townsend
