= Waukau, Wisconsin =

Census-designated place in Wisconsin, United States

- Census-designated place
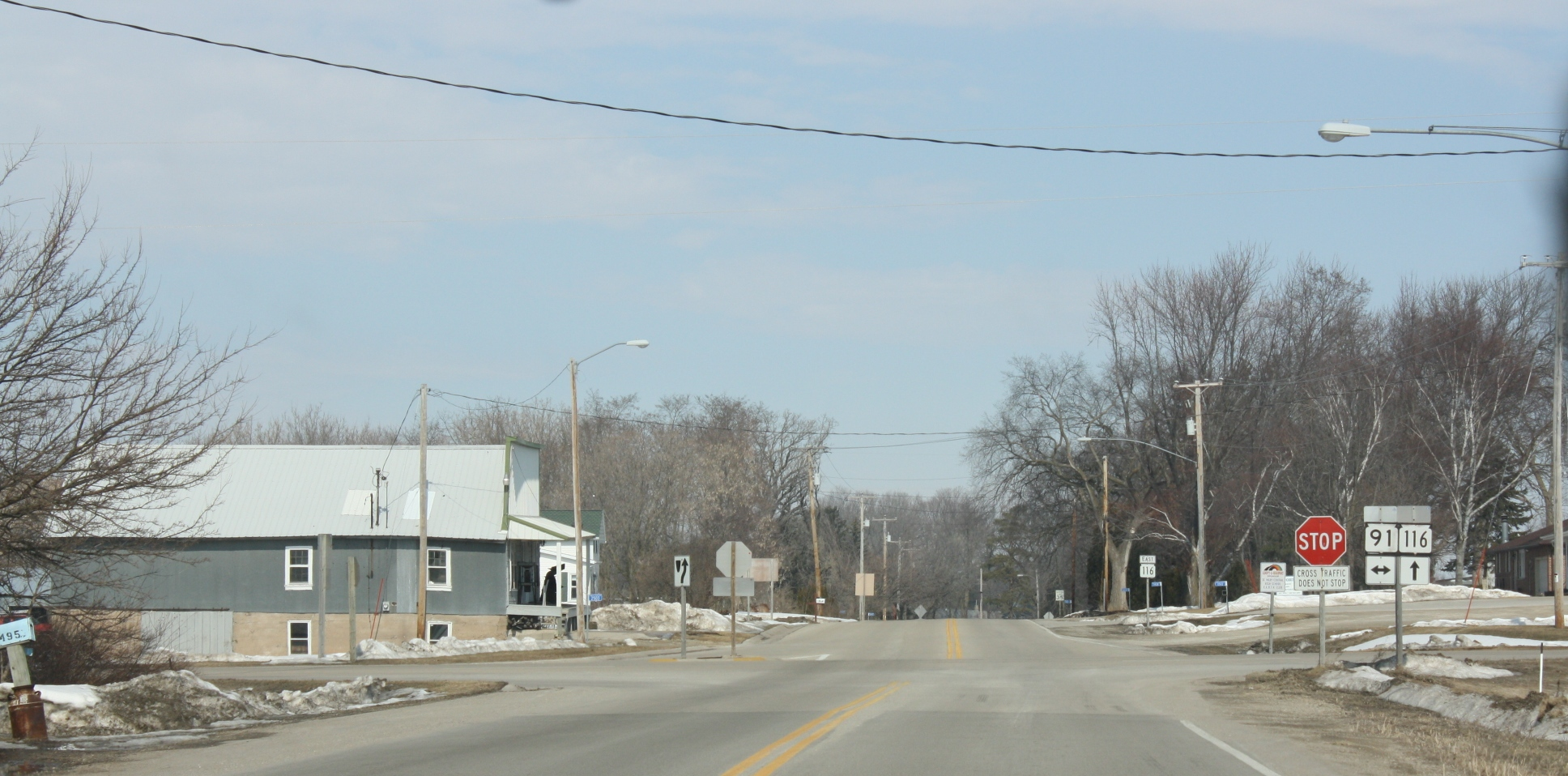
- Downtown Waukau

- Location within Wisconsin
- Coordinates: 43°59′10″N 88°46′12″W
- Country: United States
- State: Wisconsin
- County: Winnebago

Area
  - Total: 1.387 sq mi (3.59 km^{2})
  - Land: 1.376 sq mi (3.56 km^{2})
  - Water: 0.011 sq mi (0.028 km^{2})
- Elevation: 833 ft (254 m)

Population (2020)
  - Total: 302
  - Density: 219/sq mi (84.7/km^{2})
- Time zone: UTC-6 (Central (CST))
  - Summer (DST): UTC-5 (CDT)
- Zip Code: 54980
- Area code: 920
- GNIS feature ID: 1576309

Waukau is an unincorporated census-designated place in the town of Rushford, in Winnebago County, Wisconsin, United States. The community is located on Wisconsin Highway 116 at its southern terminus at Wisconsin Highway 91. As of the 2020 census, Waukau had a population of 302.

== Demographics ==
As of the census of 2000, the population of Waukau, Wisconsin was 178 people, 85 male and 93 female with a median age of 36.6, 9% under 5 years, 75.8% 18 years and over, and 11.2% 65 years and over.

The racial makeup of Waukau, Wisconsin was 97.8% White, 0.6% Black or African American, and 1.7% Multiracial American. Hispanic or Latino of any race were 2.2% of the population.

Average household size was 2.54. Average family size was 3.00. Total housing units was 73, 95.9% occupied. Of those occupied, 81.4% were owner-occupied, 18.6% renter occupied. Vacant housing units were 4.1%.

The population 25 years and over was 127, 72.4% a high school graduate or higher, and 7.1% held a bachelor's degree or higher. Civilian veteran population was 20.6%. Disability status of the population 5 years and over was 21.6%. Married male, except separated, population 15 years and over was 59.4%. Married female, except separated, population 15 years and over was 58.3%.

The population, 16 and over, in the labor force was 61.7%. Mean travel time to work for workers 16 and over was 26.1 minutes. The median household income was $41,042, median family income was $48,750, and per capita income was $16,923. Families below the poverty level was 0%. Individuals below the poverty level were 4.2%.

Single-family owner-occupied homes was 41 with a median value of $81,400. The median of selected monthly owner costs with a mortgage was $781, not mortgaged was $233.

== Notable people ==
- David R. Bean, member of the Wisconsin State Assembly
- Darwin Hall, Minnesota state legislator
- Erasmus D. Hall, member of the Wisconsin State Assembly
- Emmett R. Hicks, Wisconsin Attorney General
- Fred L. Holmes, member of the Wisconsin State Assembly
- Pierce A. Morrissey, member of the Wisconsin State Senate
- Asa Rogers, member of the Wisconsin State Assembly
- Alson Wood, member of the Wisconsin State Assembly

== Images ==
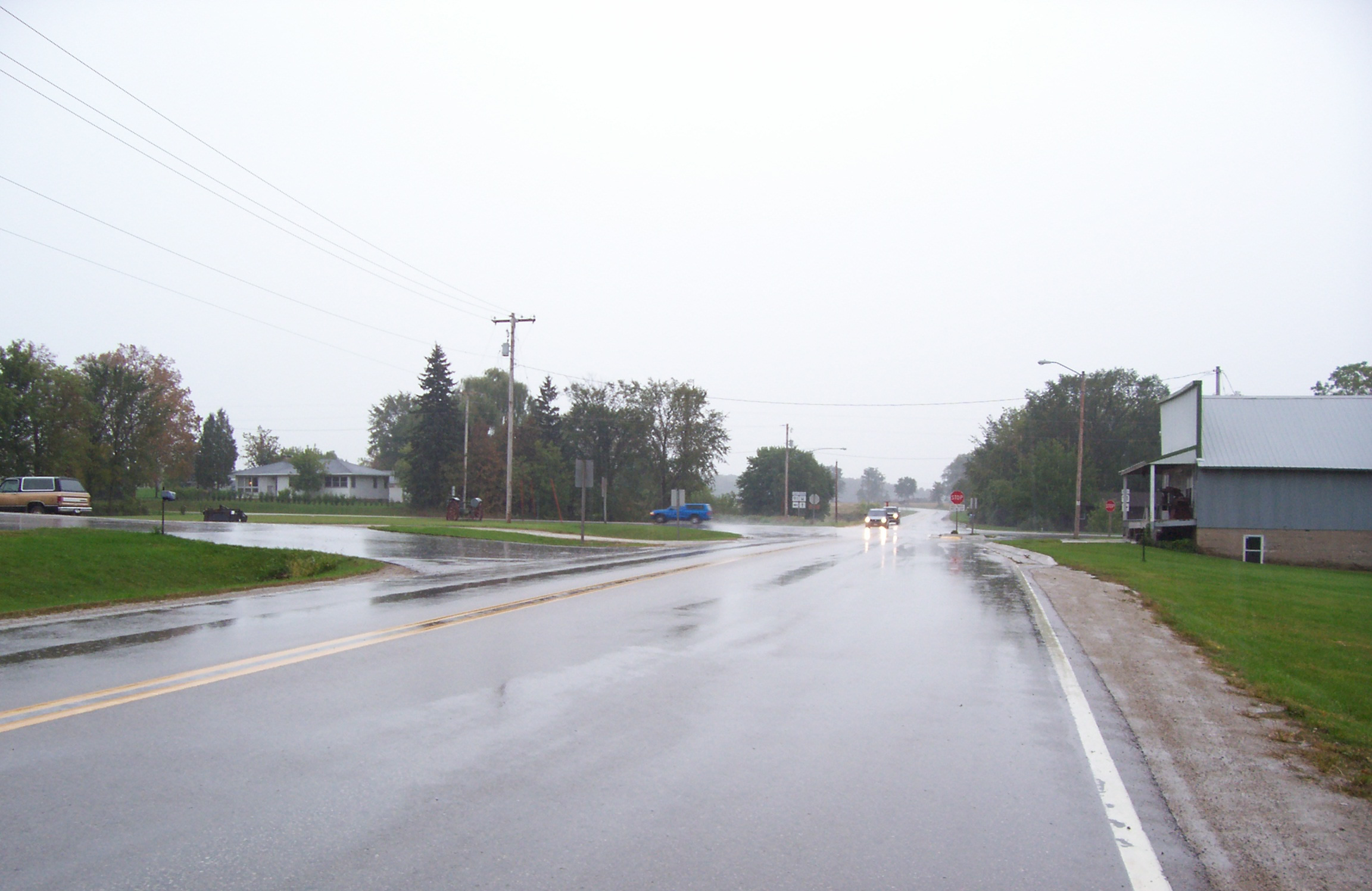
Looking south at Wisconsin Highway 116's southern terminus at the south side of Waukau

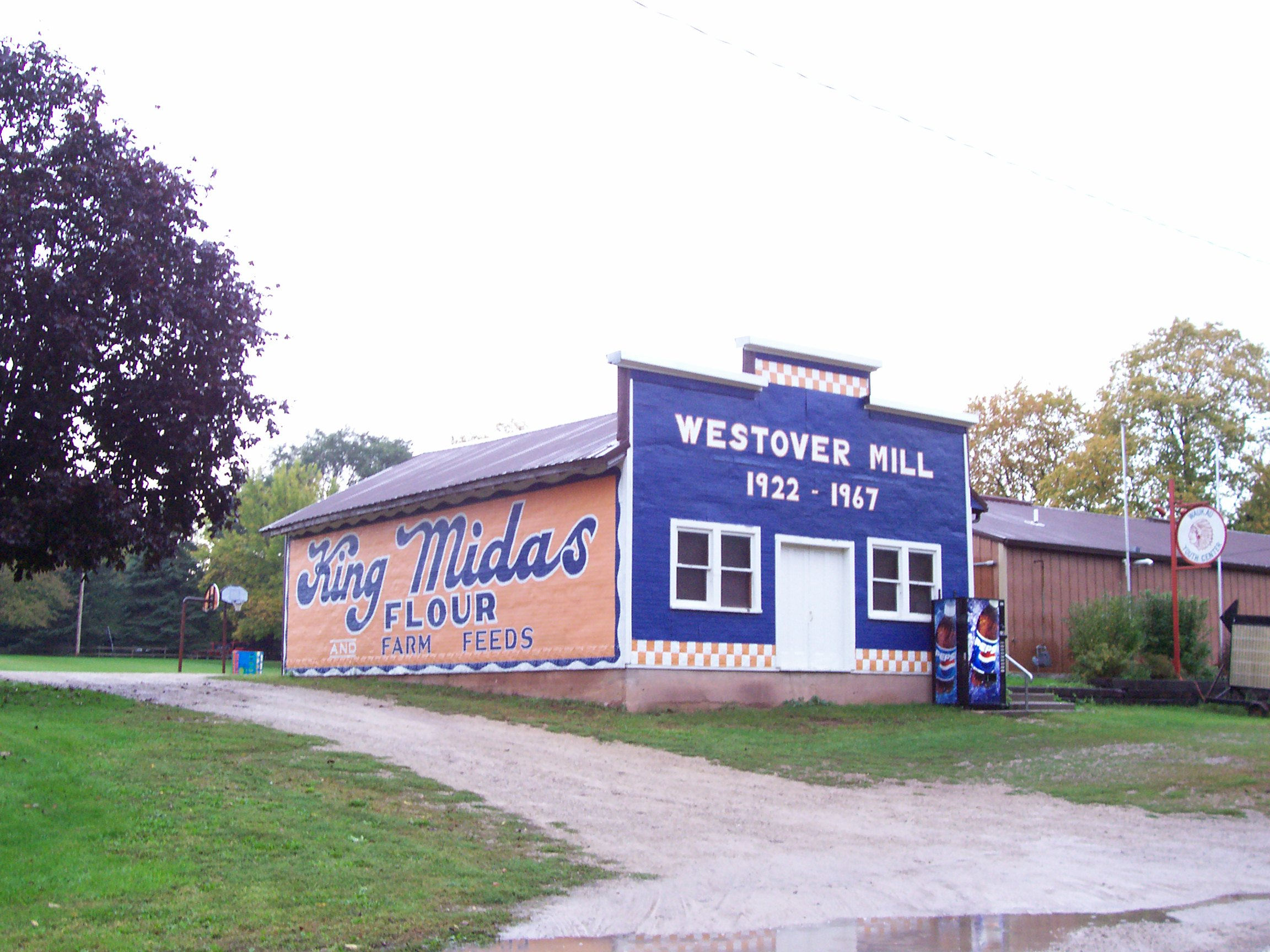
Westover Mill in Waukau
