= Rudolph, Wisconsin =

- Village
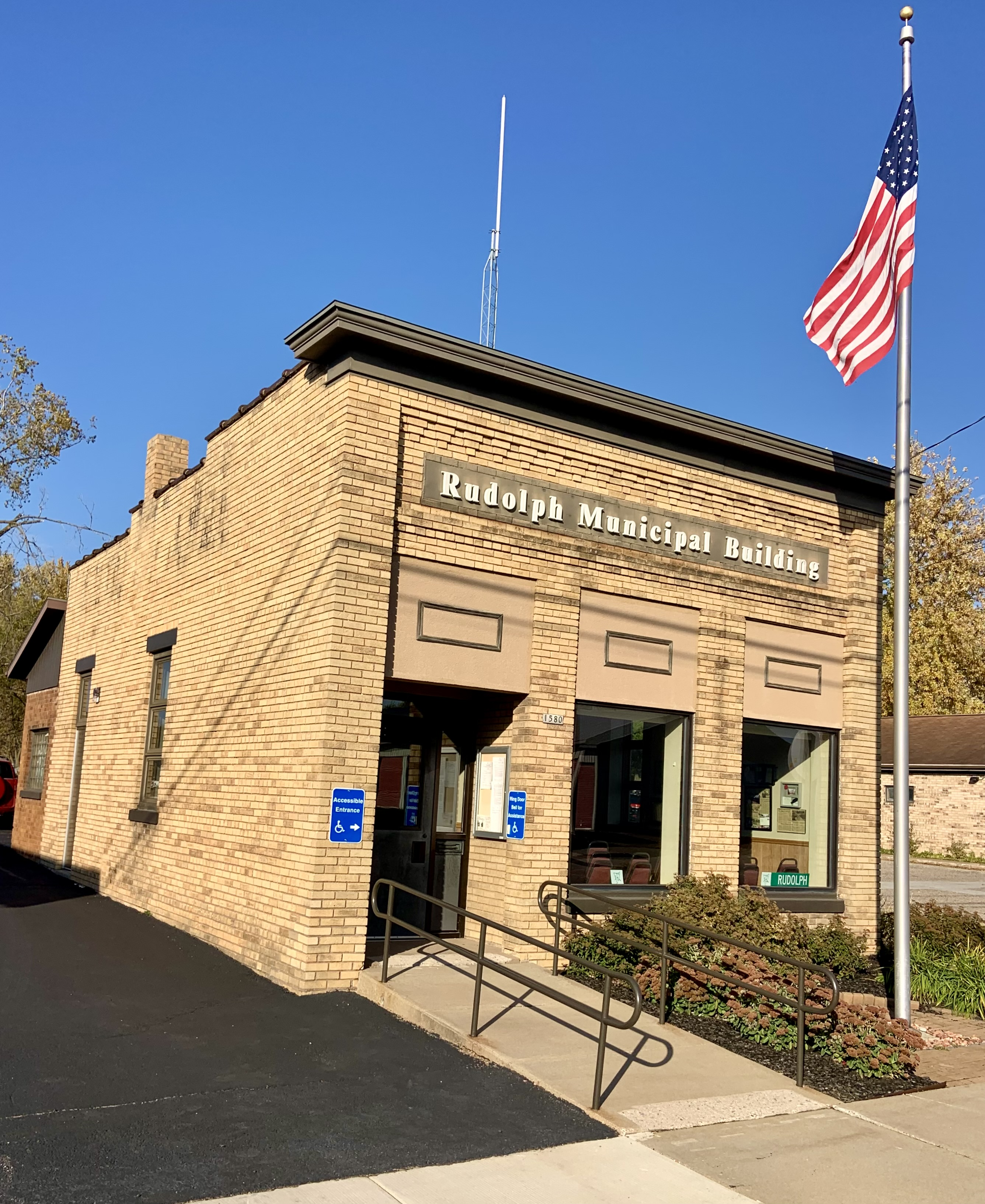
- Rudolph Municipal Building

- Location of Rudolph in Wood County, Wisconsin.
- Coordinates: 44°28′21″N 89°47′34″W
- Country: United States
- State: Wisconsin
- County: Wood

Area
  - Total: 1.20 sq mi (3.12 km^{2})
  - Land: 1.20 sq mi (3.12 km^{2})
  - Water: 0 sq mi (0.00 km^{2})
- Elevation: 1,102 ft (336 m)

Population (2020)
  - Total: 433
  - Density: 359/sq mi (139/km^{2})
- Time zone: UTC-6 (Central (CST))
  - Summer (DST): UTC-5 (CDT)
- Zip code(s): 54475
- Area codes: 715 & 534
- FIPS code: 55-70025
- GNIS feature ID: 1572713
- Website: https://villageofrudolphwi.org/

Rudolph is a village in Wood County, Wisconsin, United States. The population was 433 at the 2020 census. The village is located within the Town of Rudolph.

== History ==
Rudolph derives its name from Rudolph township, which in turn was named after Rudolph Hecox, the first white child born within the town's borders. The town was incorporated in 1960. The crossroads community is anchored by the Dairy State Cheese factory.

== Geography ==
Rudolph is located at 44°29′49″N 89°48′6″W (44.497202, -89.801896).

According to the United States Census Bureau, the village has a total area of 1.19 square miles (3.08 km^{2}), all land.

== Demographics ==
Historical population
Census	Pop.	Note	%±
1970	349		—
1980	392		12.3%
1990	451		15.1%
2000	423		−6.2%
2010	439		3.8%
2020	433		−1.4%
U.S. Decennial Census

=== 2010 census ===
As of the census of 2010, there were 439 people, 179 households, and 126 families living in the village. The population density was 368.9 inhabitants per square mile (142.4/km^{2}). There were 197 housing units at an average density of 165.5 per square mile (63.9/km^{2}). The racial makeup of the village was 97.3% White, 0.2% African American, 0.2% Native American, 0.2% Asian, 1.4% from other races, and 0.7% from two or more races. Hispanic or Latino of any race were 1.8% of the population.

There were 179 households, of which 30.7% had children under the age of 18 living with them, 58.1% were married couples living together, 8.4% had a female householder with no husband present, 3.9% had a male householder with no wife present, and 29.6% were non-families. 24.0% of all households were made up of individuals, and 8.4% had someone living alone who was 65 years of age or older. The average household size was 2.42 and the average family size was 2.85.

The median age in the village was 40.9 years. 23.5% of residents were under the age of 18; 7.5% were between the ages of 18 and 24; 25.7% were from 25 to 44; 27% were from 45 to 64; and 16.4% were 65 years of age or older. The gender makeup of the village was 51.3% male and 48.7% female.

=== 2000 census ===
As of the census of 2000, there were 423 people, 170 households, and 122 families living in the village. The population density was 388.3 people per square mile (149.8/km^{2}). There were 177 housing units at an average density of 162.5 per square mile (62.7/km^{2}). The racial makeup of the village was 95.04% White, 0.24% Black or African American, 0.71% Native American, 2.36% Asian, and 1.65% from two or more races. 1.42% of the population were Hispanic or Latino of any race.

There were 170 households, out of which 33.5% had children under the age of 18 living with them, 65.9% were married couples living together, 4.7% had a female householder with no husband present, and 28.2% were non-families. 24.7% of all households were made up of individuals, and 11.2% had someone living alone who was 65 years of age or older. The average household size was 2.49 and the average family size was 2.99.

In the village, the population was spread out, with 26.0% under the age of 18, 6.6% from 18 to 24, 29.8% from 25 to 44, 22.5% from 45 to 64, and 15.1% who were 65 years of age or older. The median age was 37 years. For every 100 females, there were 90.5 males. For every 100 females age 18 and over, there were 86.3 males.

The median income for a household in the village was $41,125, and the median income for a family was $50,625. Males had a median income of $40,500 versus $28,750 for females. The per capita income for the village was $18,895. None of the families and 3.0% of the population was living below the poverty line, including no under eighteens and 10.9% of those over 64.

== Attractions ==
- Wonder Cave
- Thousands of holiday greetings are sent each year to the Rudolph postmaster for a special Rudolph the Red-Nosed Reindeer postmark.

== Notable people ==
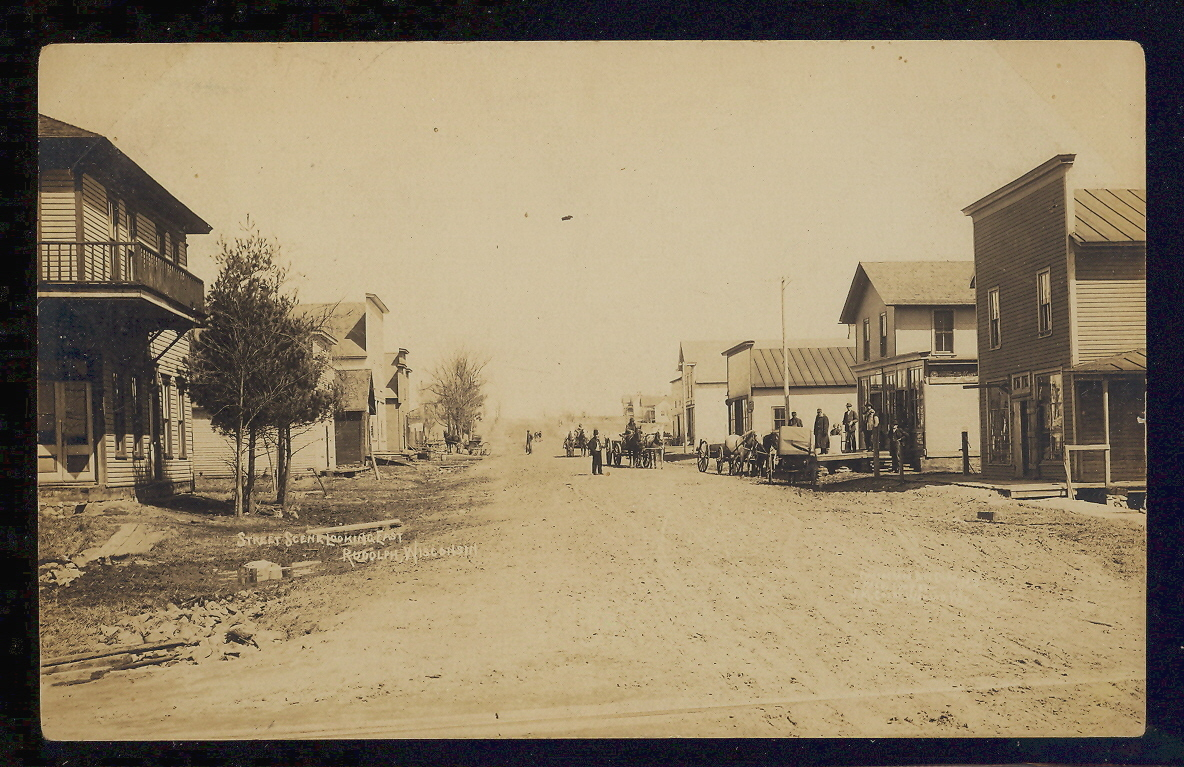
Street scene, 1910

- Jim Delsing, MLB player
- Bryan Reffner, NASCAR driver
- Dick Trickle, 1989 NASCAR Rookie of the Year
