= Chief Oshkosh =

Menominee Native American leader

Oshkosh
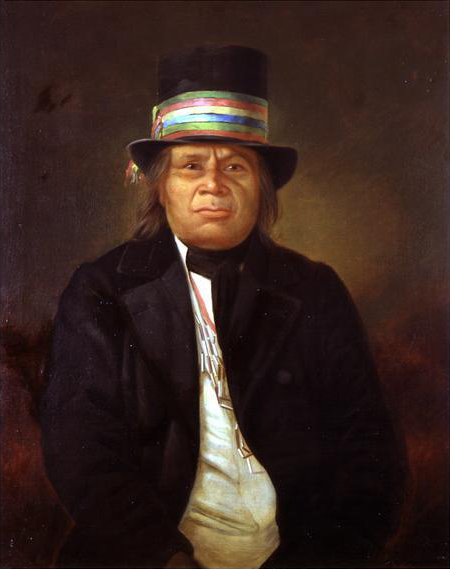
- Portrait by Samuel Marsden Brookes, c. 1858

Head Chief of the Menominee
- In office August 13, 1827 – August 31, 1858
- Preceded by: Chawanon
- Succeeded by: Akwinemi

Personal details
- Born: c. 1795 near present-day Nekoosa, Wisconsin, U.S.
- Died: August 31, 1858 (aged 62–63) Keshena, Wisconsin, U.S.
- Spouses: Bambani; Shakanouiu; Tomokoum
- Children: Akwinemi; Niopet; Koshkanoque; Kinoke
- Profession: Native American chief

Military service
- Allegiance: British Empire; United States
- Years of service: 1812–1814 (British Empire); 1832 (United States)
- Battles/wars: War of 1812; Siege of Fort Mackinac; Siege of Fort Meigs; Battle of Fort Stephenson; Battle of Mackinac Island; Black Hawk War

Chief Oshkosh (also spelled Os-kosh or Oskosh) (c. 1795 – August 31, 1858 (Note: Various sources give different dates for Oshkosh's death. Scott Cross places the chief's death on August 31, 1858, and cites Oshkosh's obituary from the Shawano Venture and an excerpt from a report by a U.S. Indian Agent as evidence. In his book The Menomini Indians, Walter James Hoffman also quotes the Indian Agent's report, supporting an August 31 death date, but elsewhere gives Oshkosh's death as August 21, 1858. Patricia Ourada claims the chief died on September 11, 1858.)) was a chief of the Menominee Native Americans, recognized as the leader of the Menominee people by the United States government from August 7, 1827, until his death. He was involved in treaty negotiations as the United States sought to acquire more of the Menominee tribe's land in Wisconsin and Michigan for both white settlers and relocated Oneida, Stockbridge, Munsee, and Brothertown Indians. The Menominee ceded over 10,000,000 acres (40,000 km^{2}) of land to the United States. However, Oshkosh resisted U.S. government pressure for the tribe to relocate to northern Minnesota and played a key role in securing the 235,524-acre (953.13 km^{2}) Menominee Indian Reservation as a permanent home for his people on their ancestral land.

Oshkosh, Wisconsin, is named after him.

== Early life ==
Oshkosh ("Claw"; cf. Ojibwe oshkanzhiin, "claw") was probably born in about 1795 at Point Basse on the Wisconsin River, near present-day Nekoosa, Wisconsin. His family belonged to the Bear Clan, and his grandfather Chawanon was head chief of the Menominee. During the War of 1812, Oshkosh fought on the British side with a band of approximately one-hundred Menominee warriors led by Tomah, also known as Thomas Caron, a Menominee chief whose paternal grandfather was a French military officer. Oshkosh was present at the sieges of Fort Mackinac, Fort Meigs, and Fort Stephenson, as well as the 1814 Battle of Mackinac Island.

== Chief of the Menominee ==
Head Chief Chawanon died in 1821 without leaving a clear successor. In 1827, Oshkosh was involved in negotiations with the United States Federal Government at Butte des Morts, Wisconsin, to resettle Christianized Oneida, Stockbridge, and Munsee people from New York and western Massachusetts on Menominee land in Wisconsin. Michigan Territorial governor Lewis Cass and Superintendent of Indian Affairs Thomas L. McKenney negotiated on behalf of the U.S. government. Cass lamented the lack of centralized leadership among the Menominee at the time, saying "We have observed for some time the Menomonees to be a in bad situation as to their chiefs. There is no one we can talk to as head of the nation...like a flock of geese without a leader, some fly one way and some another. At the opening of the council [at Butte des Mortes], we [the United States government] shall appoint a principal chief of the Menomonees...We shall give him the medal, and expect the Menomonees to respect him." On August 7, 1827, Cass and McKenney declared Oshkosh to be the Principal Chief of the Menominee, making him the intermediary between the United States government and the Menominee people.

=== Murder trial ===
On June 3, 1830, a Pawnee man named Okewa (also known as Antoine), who was enslaved by a Métis family in Green Bay was hunting and accidentally killed a Menominee man who belonged to Oshkosh's band. He reported the incident to Oshkosh, who was in Green Bay at the time. Oshkosh and two other men stabbed Okewa to death. The three men were arrested and charged with murder. Some historians have interpreted Oshkosh's actions as having fallen in line with the Menominee tradition of justice practiced at that time; an enslaved person could be killed for taking a Menominee person's life under any circumstances, even if it was an accident.

When the case came to trial, the jury ruled that while Oshkosh was guilty of killing Okewa, he had acted in accordance with Menominee custom and could not be convicted of murder. Unfamiliar with the nuances of the law, the jury asked Judge James Duane Doty to render the final verdict. Doty acquitted Oshkosh and the other two men, believing that they should not be punished for following traditional customs. He ruled that United States laws did not apply to Native Americans under the circumstances, because, at the time, Native Americans were not granted the privileges of citizenship under the law, so U.S. law did not apply to their internal disputes and affairs on their own lands.

However, Eleazer Williams recalled that his mother-in-law, who was related to the Métis family that enslaved Okewa, considered asking a council of chiefs to kill Oshkosh as an act of retribution for Okewa's death. According to Williams, Oshkosh possibly feared for his life and apologized to the woman by "acknowledg[ing] the murder, thr[owing] himself on her mercy, and implor[ing] pardon," which she granted.

=== Treaties ===
The territorial dispute between the Menominee, the U.S. government, and the New York Native American groups was not resolved until 1832. The Menominee first signed the 1831 Treaty of Washington, in which they ceded 2,500,000 acres (10,000 km^{2}) between Lake Michigan and Lake Winnebago to the United States for $125,000. They then signed a second treaty in Washington, D.C., on October 27, 1832, ceding an additional 250,000 acres (1,000 km^{2}) to the New York Native American groups. Oshkosh was present at the initial negotiations in Green Bay, but he did not travel to Washington, D.C., to sign the treaties. His younger brother signed the 1832 treaty in his stead.

While the negotiations of the 1832 treaty were ongoing, the Menominee sided with the United States during the Black Hawk War. Three hundred pro-U.S. Native American troops were raised in Green Bay in July 1832, including Oshkosh, who was part of a band that patrolled the Mississippi River under the command of William S. Hamilton.

In 1836, the U.S. government sought to acquire more Menominee land in the newly created Wisconsin Territory. Oshkosh and Territorial Governor Henry Dodge conducted negotiations at a site along the Fox River. In the resulting Treaty of the Cedars, the Menominee ceded 4,000,000 acres (16,000 km^{2}) along the Fox River, west of Lake Winnebago, and east of Green Bay for $800,000, with the tribe agreeing to relocate to a site near Lake Poygan.

In 1848, the United States and the Menominee negotiated the Treaty of Lake Poygan, in which Oshkosh ceded the Menominee's remaining lands in Wisconsin in exchange for 600,000 acres (2,400 km^{2}) along the Crow Wing River in Minnesota and $20,000. A clause in the treaty allowed the tribe to remain in Wisconsin until 1850. William Medill and Morgan Lewis Martin were among the representatives of the United States government, while Oshkosh was accompanied by other Menominee chiefs as well as interpreter Augustin Grignon. Grignon's son-in-law Louis Porlier was also present and later recalled that the Menominee initially rejected the government's offer of relocating to Minnesota, at which point Morgan L. Martin approached Porlier and advised him that the Menominee "ought to make the most advantageous [treaty] they can; for if they persist in refusing to treat, the president can at his pleasure order their removal, without giving them another chance to make a treaty, and then it would be optional with him whether to them anything or nothing." Porlier and Grignon then spoke to Oshkosh, who signed the treaty the following day.

Oshkosh led a delegation to visit the Crow Wing River area in 1850, but was disappointed with what he found. The Menominee found few opportunities for hunting and were concerned when they found that the region was already embroiled in intertribal war between the Ojibwe and Sioux peoples. He traveled to Washington, D.C., in August 1850 to request that President Millard Fillmore allow the tribe to remain in Wisconsin. Fillmore initially permitted the tribe to remain in Wisconsin until June 1, 1851, and granted two additional extensions in 1851. In 1852, the Menominee were allowed to stay on a temporary reservation on the Wolf River in northeastern Wisconsin. The 1854 Wolf River Treaty made the 250,000-acre (1,000 km^{2}) Menominee Indian Reservation permanent. Oshkosh was reportedly unhappy with the treaty, first refusing to sign, and then begrudgingly signing after the government increased financial compensation for the tribe, saying "I [sign] without my consent. My tribe compels me to sign it."

In 1856, the U.S. government relocated the Stockbridge, Munsee, and Brothertown Indian tribes again, settling adjacent to the new Menominee Reservation. On February 11, 1856, Oshkosh and other Menominee leaders signed a treaty granting 46,000 acres (190 km2) of the Menominee Indian Reservation to the other tribes, creating a separate reservation for the Stockbridge–Munsee Community.

== Personal life ==
Oshkosh married three times. He and his first wife, Bambani, had three sons who survived to adulthood: Akwinemi, Niopet, and Koshkanoque. He had no surviving children with his second wife, Shakanouiu. He and his third wife, Tomokoum, had a daughter, Kinoke. He also had at least one adopted son, who was killed on January 1, 1850 in a bar fight with a white man in Grand Rapids, Wisconsin.

Oshkosh had a reputation for drinking heavily. According to Augustin Grignon, he was "only of medium size, possessing much good sense and ability, but [was] a great slave to strong drink, and two of his three sons surpass[ed] their father in this beastly vice." However, a pioneer who knew Oshkosh recalled that while the chief was fond of alcohol, "stories to the effect that he was continually intoxicated are not true."

== Death and burial ==
According to his obituary in the Shawano Venture, Oshkosh and two of his sons were under the influence of alcohol when they killed him in a fight in Keshena, Wisconsin, on August 31, 1858. His eldest son, Akwinemi, who was involved in the fight, succeeded him as head chief in 1859 and held the role until 1871, when he was deposed and imprisoned for stabbing another man.

In 1926, the Menominee allowed Oshkosh's remains to be moved to Menominee Park in Oshkosh, Wisconsin, where they were interred at the foot of a monument dedicated to him, covered with an inscribed granite slab. Soon after, doubts arose as to whether the Menominee had handed over the actual remains. Some speculate his remains were never removed from the Menominee reservation and a different body was interred at the monument, possibly a woman. The monument is usually referred to in city documents as the Oshkosh "burial site" using scare quotes to reflect this.
