= D. D. Conway =

American politician

Dennis D. Conway (May 3, 1868 – December 15, 1926) was an American lawyer and politician from Grand Rapids, Wisconsin, who was elected 1912 to a single term as a member of the Wisconsin State Assembly from Wood County.

== Background ==
Mr. Conway was born May 3, 1868, on a farm in the Town of Rudolph in Wood County. He worked on the farm, in sawmills and in the woods, attending local public schools intermittently when he was not needed for the farm and other work.

He eventually attended the Oshkosh Normal School, and graduated from the Northwestern Business College in Madison. He taught school for three years; graduated from the University of Wisconsin Law School in June 1895; and took up law practice in Grand Rapids in July of that year, specializing in personal injury cases for laborers.

== Elected offices ==
Conway, a Democrat (by 1897 already a member of the Party's State Central Committee), was elected Clerk of the Circuit Court of Wood County in 1890 at the age of twenty-two, and held the office for two terms. He was a member of the county board of supervisors, Grand Rapids city attorney, and county district attorney, and defeated a popular incumbent county superintendent of schools, the only victor on the county's Democratic ticket that year.

In 1906, he was the Democratic nominee for Congress from the 10th District, but lost to Republican Elmer A. Morse.

In 1912 Conway was elected to the Assembly, with 2,370 votes to 2,318 for Republican Robert Morris, 318 for Social Democrat Clark Lyon, and 112 for Prohibitionist F. E. Kellner (Democratic incumbent William E. Wheelan was not a candidate). Although Conway was elected on the Democratic ticket, in the 1913 Wisconsin Blue Book he chose to describe himself as a "Progressive Democrat", implying affiliation with 1912 Presidential candidate Theodore Roosevelt's Progressive Party. He was assigned to the standing committee on rules.

He was not a candidate for re-election in 1914, and was succeeded by Republican George Hambrecht.

== After the Assembly ==
Conway died at the Mayo Clinic in Rochester, Minnesota, on December 15, 1926, and was described in his obituary as "active in state Democratic politics".
