= Alson Wood =

American politician

Alson S. Wood (February 3, 1828 – March 31, 1904) was an American politician and businessman.

Born in Milton, Vermont, Wood moved to Wisconsin in 1858 and was in the milling business. He settled in Waukau, Wisconsin, and served on the Rushford Town Board. In 1872 and 1873, Wood served in the Wisconsin State Assembly and was a member of the Republican Party. Wood moved to Charlevoix, Michigan, and died there at his home.
