= Treaty of the Cedars =

1836 treaty between the Menominee and the United States

The Treaty of the Cedars was an 1836 agreement between the Menominee Indian nation and the United States in which the Menominee ceded to the United States about 4,000,000 acres (16,000 km^{2}) of land for $700,000. The agreement opened that huge tract of forest to logging and White settlement. In this area grew the cities of Oshkosh, Neenah, Menasha, Appleton, Marinette, Oconto, Escanaba, Michigan, Wausau, Wisconsin Rapids, and Stevens Point. The treaty was also a step toward reducing the Menominee's land to the current Menominee Indian Reservation.

== Background ==
The Menominee people have lived in Wisconsin as long as anyone knows. From the arrival of French explorers in the 1600s, the Menominee generally lived in peace with the European newcomers, though some fought on the side of the British against the Americans in the War of 1812. In 1816 Fort Howard was built on their land—the first U.S. outpost in eastern Wisconsin.

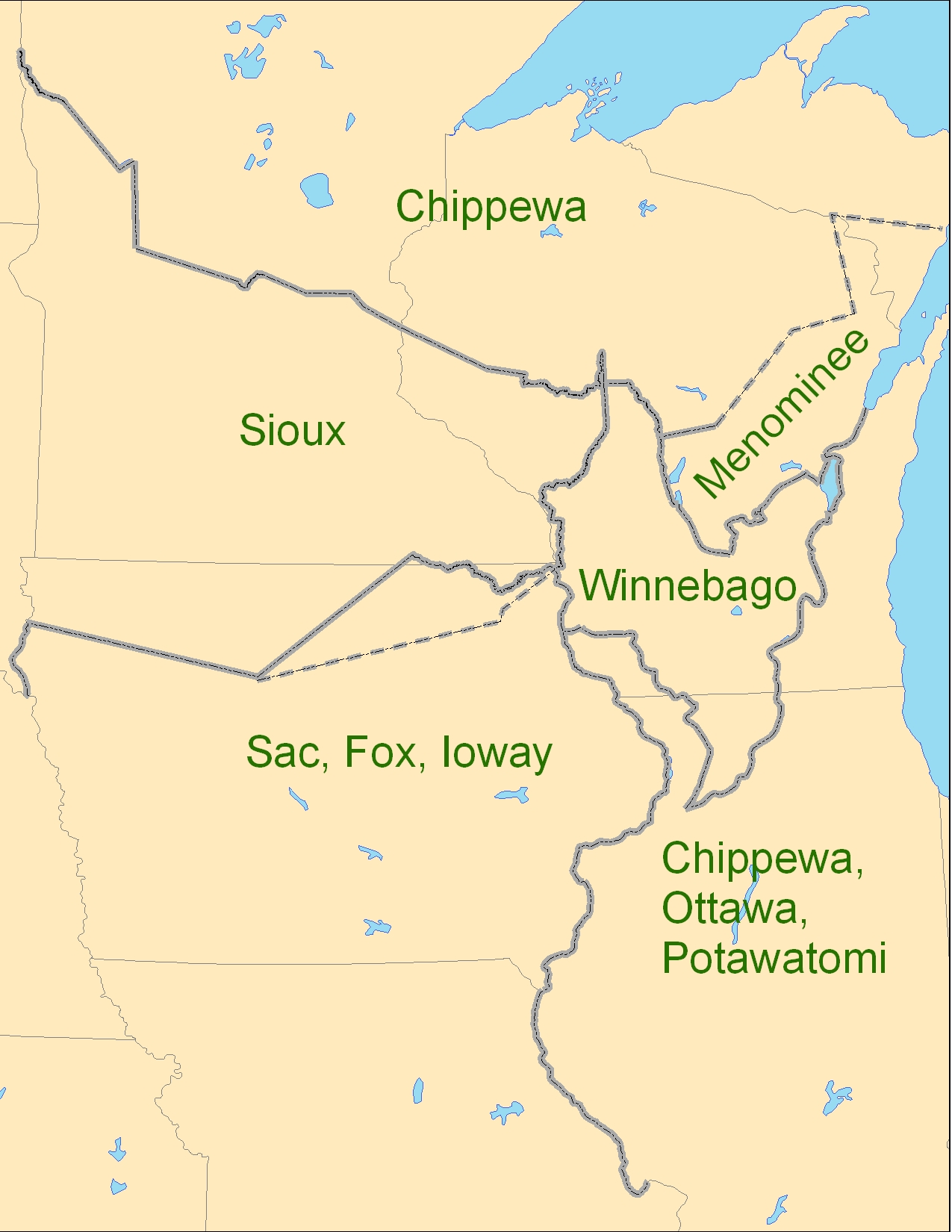
Boundaries drawn by 1825 treaty

The 1825 First Treaty of Prairie du Chien aimed to draw clear boundaries between various Indian tribes, to prevent conflicts between them. A few Menominee representatives were present and signed, but they didn't have enough authority within the tribe, so the lines were adjusted again in the 1827 Treaty of Butte des Morts.

In the 1831 Treaty of Washington some Menominee chiefs ceded much of their land in eastern Wisconsin to the U.S. This occurred in the context of President Andrew Jackson's 1830 Indian Removal Act, in which tribes in other parts of the eastern U.S. like the Cherokee were forced to move west of the Mississippi River to make way for White settlers. In the negotiation, the Menominee chiefs claimed a much larger area than the 1825 treaty, reaching from Milwaukee to Door County far into the UP and west to what would become Eau Claire. These claims overlapped with claims of the Potawatomi, the Sioux and the Ho-Chunk. In the final treaty, the Menominee ceded their land from Green Bay to Milwaukee to Fond du Lac in exchange for a one-time payment of $10,000 worth of provisions, $6,000 per year for twelve years, plus $5,000 a year for four years for some land that was given to the Oneida, Brothertown and Stockbridge Indians who had been moved in from New York. Divided among 3,000 Menominee, this payment was not much - even for the twelve years while payments lasted. And some of the payment went to set up a demonstration farm which aimed to turn the Menominee into farmers, which most of the Menominee didn't want. By the mid-1830s Chief Grizzly Bear, who had signed the treaty, had died, and young Chief Oshkosh and others were grumbling that the terms of the treaty of 1831 were not good for the Menominee.

== Treaty of the Cedars ==
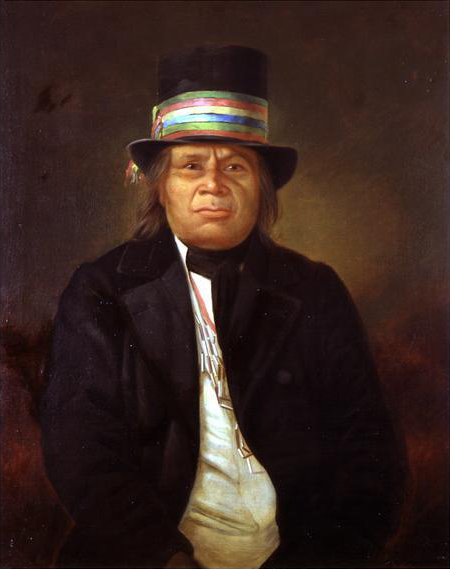
Chief Oshkosh

In 1835 Chief Oshkosh told the Indian agent that the Menominee wanted to discuss selling some land from the northwest part of their territory. The agent relayed this up the chain through Lewis Cass, former Governor of Michigan Territory and then Secretary of War, to President Jackson. In 1836 the new governor of Wisconsin Territory, Henry Dodge, was directed to buy any land that the Indian tribes would sell, and to move any Green Bay Indians west of the Mississippi River if possible.

Dodge arranged the treaty talk at a place called The Cedars, on the Fox River below Grand Chute, in late August of 1836. This may be the place described in 1831 as, "Some distance below the Chute there is a bold prominance [sic] at an angle to the river, which overlooks seventy miles of the rapids, which present an interesting and beautiful spectacle." The site was probably chosen because it was an easy journey for most of the Menominee, yet far enough from whiskey at white settlements downstream. Word of the meeting went out and people began arriving in late August.

This was not a simple two-sided negotiation between the Menominee chiefs and Governor Dodge. Joining the Menominee for this meeting were traders like Louis Grignon, Augustin Grignon of Butte des Morts, Joe Rolette of Prairie du Chien, and Judge John Lawe. The traders wanted to be paid overdue debts by some of the Menominee. Eight missionaries were present, who generally wanted the Menominee moved away from white settlers. Indian agent George Boyd attended, and attorney Henry S. Baird served as secretary of the commission. Army officers from Fort Howard were present. Menominee métis were there to ensure they got a share of the payments. Of these métis, Charles A. Grignon and William Powell served as the official interpreters.

Governor Dodge had fought a band of Sauk people and Fox in the Black Hawk War, but he respected the Menomonie and recognized the immense value of their land. He wrote to a friend:

The growth of our Territory is so intimately connected with our Indian relations, that I view it as a matter of the first importance to do the Indians ample justice in all our treaty stipulations. A little Indian difficulty would greatly impede the settlement of the country, and experience has given us some useful lessons on this subject as to the expense of Indian wars.

Louise Phelps Kellogg interpreted this as, "a treaty, at almost any price, was cheaper than war."

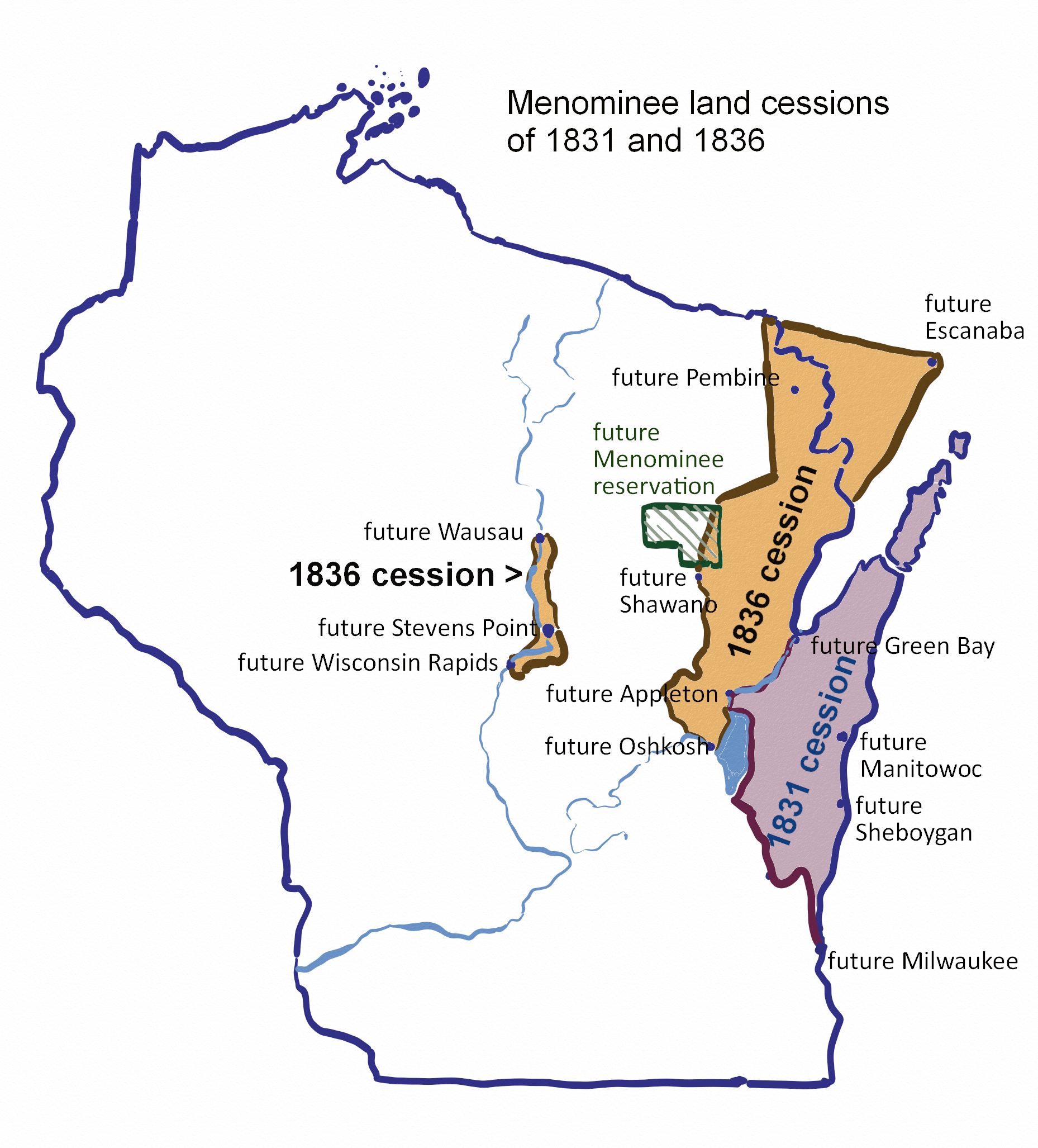
Lands ceded in 1831 and 1836

Formal discussion started on August 29. Seeing how opposed the Menominee were to moving across the Mississippi, Dodge had given up that idea and instead focused on buying a large chunk of their land. Chief Oshkosh offered their land east of the Wolf River - about three million acres. Dodge asked for some additional land along the Wisconsin River, to supply lumber for settlers there, and they agreed on a strip covering three miles on each side of the river for twenty-four miles, reaching roughly from the sites of modern Wisconsin Rapids to Wausau. In exchange, the Menominee initially asked for $2,000,000. They eventually agreed on a package worth about $700,000, paid in annual payments over 20 years. Salt, tobacco, and clothes would be given with those annual payments. Dodge persuaded the traders to settle for half the value of their debts. $80,000 went to the métis. On September 3 Dodge and the chiefs signed the agreement.

Five months later, in February of 1837, the U.S. Senate ratified the treaty. Dodge would like to have given the Menominee more for the huge area, but $700,000 was a large amount to pay for a land cession at the time, and he felt the Senate would have refused to ratify a larger payment.

== Aftermath ==
In 1838 the Menominee who lived east of the Wolf River began abandoning their homes to re-settle west of the river.

Shortly after the treaty was signed, lumbermen over on the Wisconsin River began exploring the 24-mile stretch for mill sites. In 1838 the first sawmill was operating at what would become Wisconsin Rapids and in 1840 at the future Wausau. By 1847, twenty-four mills on the Wisconsin - many in the strip opened by the Treaty of the Cedars - produced almost twenty million board feet per year. Huge tracts were opened to logging east of the Wolf River too, reaching from Oshkosh to Iron Mountain, Michigan to Escanaba.

Lumber from all these areas helped build local towns and farms, nearby cities like Oshkosh and Green Bay, and distant cities like Chicago and St. Louis. The lumber mills in the ceded land grew into cities that outlived the lumber boom and still exist, with diversified economies.

The Treaty of the Cedars itself is notable for being negotiated so quickly and efficiently, probably because Dodge was acquainted with all the parties. It was also considered rather fair for a cession treaty at the time. Most of the parties were content with the terms.

In 1848, under U.S. pressure, the Menominee ceded the rest of their lands (west of the Wolf River) in the Treaty of Lake Poygan. In exchange, they agreed to move by 1850 from Wisconsin to a similar-sized area near the Crow Wing River in central Minnesota and receive ten years of payments. However, after Chief Oshkosh and the clan leaders actually visited the Crow Wing River country, they returned to declare, "the poorest region in Wisconsin was better than the Crow Wing." Part of their concern was the Menominees' safety in a zone of fighting between the Dakota and Ojibwe. Chief Oshkosh and a delegation convinced President Fillmore to delay the move to Crow Wing, which led instead in a few years to the establishment of a reservation in their Wisconsin homeland, which is roughly the modern Menominee Indian Reservation.
