= Thomas J. Townsend =

American politician

Thomas J. Townsend (? - October 8, 1862) was a surveyor, ferry operator, politician and emigration agent from Wisconsin. In 1849, he was elected from Winnebago, Wisconsin to represent Winnebago County in the Wisconsin State Assembly (he was a Whig), succeeding fellow Whig Erasmus D. Hall. He served a single one-year term, and was succeeded by Leonard P. Crary, a Democrat.

Townsend was among the pioneers of Waushara, helping to get that county split off from Marquette County. In 1851, he laid out the village of Sacramento, Wisconsin; in March of that year, the legislature granted him the right to operate a ferry across the Fox River where it ran through the village. In 1853, he was appointed "Traveling Emigrant Agent [sic]" for the State of Wisconsin at a salary of $1,500. During that year he traveled 42,000 miles and visited every important city in the northern states and in eastern Canada and nearly every village in New York and New England. He inserted advertisements for Wisconsin in over 900 newspapers.

In May 1861, President Abraham Lincoln appointed Townsend surveyor general of Wisconsin and Iowa, a position he would hold until his death on October 8, 1862.
