= Lake Wazeecha, Wisconsin =

Census-designated place in Wisconsin, United States

- CDP
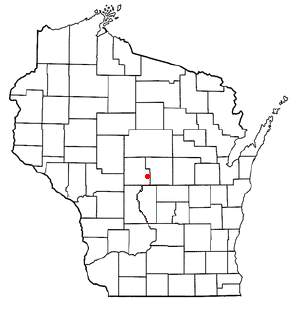
- Location of Lake Wazeecha, Wisconsin
- Coordinates: 44°22′10″N 89°45′1″W
- Country: United States
- State: Wisconsin
- County: Wood

Area
  - Total: 3.9 sq mi (10.2 km^{2})
  - Land: 3.7 sq mi (9.7 km^{2})
  - Water: 0.19 sq mi (0.5 km^{2})
- Elevation: 1,033 ft (315 m)

Population (2020)
  - Total: 3,107
  - Density: 830/sq mi (320/km^{2})
- Time zone: UTC-6 (Central (CST))
  - Summer (DST): UTC-5 (CDT)
- Area codes: 715 & 534
- FIPS code: 55-41975
- GNIS feature ID: 1867660

Lake Wazeecha is a census-designated place (CDP) in the town of Grand Rapids, Wood County, Wisconsin, United States. As of the 2020 census, Lake Wazeecha had a population of 3,107.

== Geography ==
Lake Wazeecha is located at 44°22′10″N 89°45′1″W (44.369508, -89.750413).

According to the United States Census Bureau, the CDP has a total area of 4 square miles (10.2 km^{2}), of which 3.8 square miles (9.7 km^{2}) is land and 0.2 square mile (0.5 km^{2}) (4.81%) is water.

== Demographics ==
As of the census of 2000, there were 2,659 people, 953 households, and 779 families residing in the CDP. The population density was 708 people per square mile (273/km^{2}). There were 991 housing units at an average density of 263.9/sq mi (101.8/km^{2}). The racial makeup of the CDP was 98.31% White, 0.15% African American, 0.56% Native American, 0.79% Asian, and 0.19% from two or more races. Hispanic or Latino people of any race were 0.79% of the population.

There were 953 households, out of which 40% had children under the age of 18 living with them, 74.3% were married couples living together, 5.2% had a female householder with no husband present, and 18.2% were non-families. 14.4% of all households were made up of individuals, and 4% had someone living alone who was 65 years of age or older. The average household size was 2.78 and the average family size was 3.09.

In the CDP, the population was spread out, with 28.6% under the age of 18, 5.9% from 18 to 24, 30.4% from 25 to 44, 26.4% from 45 to 64, and 8.8% who were 65 years of age or older. The median age was 38 years. For every 100 females, there were 104.7 males. For every 100 females age 18 and over, there were 100.7 males.

The median income for a household in the CDP was $54,261, and the median income for a family was $58,347. Males had a median income of $41,773 versus $28,940 for females. The per capita income for the CDP was $22,094. About 3.2% of families and 4.5% of the population were below the poverty line, including 2.7% of those under age 18 and 12.8% of those age 65 or over.
