= Augustin Grignon =

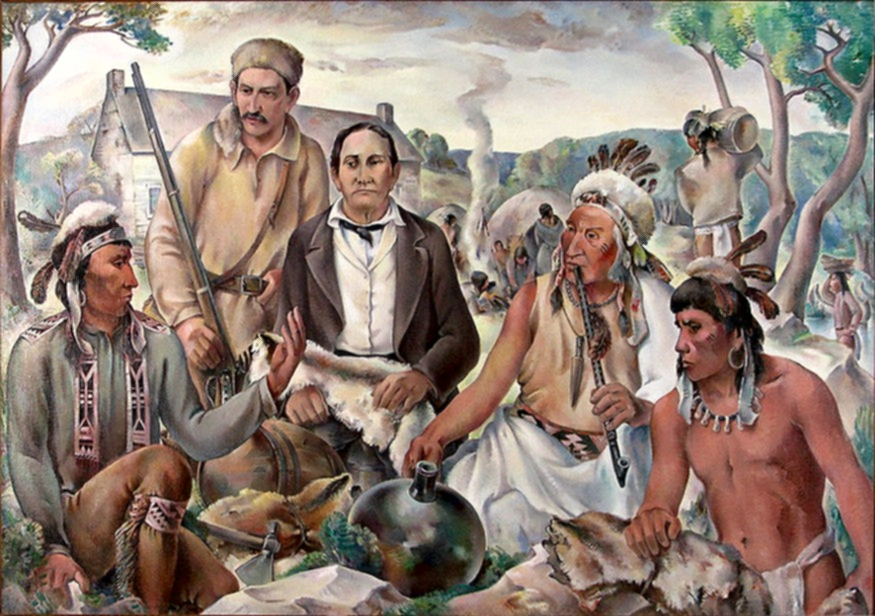
A. Grignon Trading with the Indians, by Vladimir Rousseff, 1938

Augustin Grignon (June 27, 1780 – October 2, 1860) was a fur trader and general entrepreneur in the Fox River Valley in territorial Wisconsin, surviving into its early years of statehood. He was the last in a line of French fur traders, and as the leading trader at the portage at Kaukauna on the important Fox-Wisconsin Waterway, knew many major figures from that era. Near the end of his life he gave an important account of the early history of Wisconsin.

Augustin was born in Green Bay, the third of nine children of Pierre Grignon Sr., and Domitelle Langlade Grignon. (His father also had three children by an earlier marriage.) His maternal grandfather was Métis Charles Langlade, widely considered to be the "father of Wisconsin." He ran his father's store in Green Bay with his brother, Pierre Jr., from the time of his father's death in 1795 until 1805.

In that year, at the age of 25, Augustin married Nancy McCrea, daughter of a Montreal fur trader and a Menominee woman - a relative of Chief Oshkosh. The newlyweds moved from Green Bay to property she inherited near Kaukauna. They bought more land, accumulating 1520 acres north of the rapids, and farmed and traded. Part of his business was hauling goods around the Kau-kau-lin rapids for voyageurs while they guided their empty canoes through the torrent. In 1821 he and his brother built a flour mill and gristmill there. Augustin and Nancy eventually had six children. He has been described as, "the principal figure on the lower Fox River; his frontier hospitality, his largesse, were remarked in numerous travel narratives. His children were trilingual, his sons official translators, Indian agents, Indian advisers."

In 1832 Augustin led a company of Menominee warriors to southern Wisconsin as part of the American expeditionary force against the Sauk and Fox (Menominee enemies) in the Black Hawk War. That same year, Augustin was granted the first private property in Columbia County, at strategic Fort Winnebago. In 1834 he transferred his Kaukauna operations to his sons and went into semi-retirement, engaging in the fur trade at Butte des Morts, where he had established a trading post in 1818 with his partner Jacques Porlier.

In 1857 Lyman Draper, then Corresponding Secretary of the Wisconsin Historical Society, interviewed 77-year-old Augustin and edited his stories into Augustin Grignon's Recollections. Draper wrote:

I have taken great pains to elicit from Mr. Grignon a narrative as replete as possible, of the men, events, habits and life of the olden times. I felt that another such opportunity of securing a full account of the early settlement and early men of Eastern Wsiconsin would never again occur; a native of the country, and an intelligent descendant, as he is, of the Sieur Charles de Langlade, emphatically the Father of Wisconsin, and personally acquainted with him as well also as with Glode, Tomah and other noted Menomone chiefs; and with Reaume, Porlier, Laws and their fellow pioneers, a participant in the war of 1812, and in the Black Hawk war: with a retentive memory, in no wise disposed to exaggerate, filled with a just and discriminating knowledge of the men and events of Wisconsin for the past seventy-two years, and by tradition for the forty years preceding - such a living chronicle we may never expect to see again in Wisconsin. Very much of this information he alone possessed.... and his narrative is all the more precious, as it covers a period when there were no newspapers in Wisconsin, as there now are, to chronicle the occurrences of each passing day, no diaries kept, and but two or three casual traverlers who have left us any memorials of their observations, and those exceedingly meagre. I may over-estimate the historic value of Mr. Grignon's narrative, but I think not..."

Old Augustin died three years after Draper's timely interviews, on October 2, 1860 at Butte des Morts.

Though accounts of Augustin are positive, he remains a complicated figure. His ancestry was French-Canadian, Menominee and Ottawa, in the typical French tradition of fur traders marrying Indian nobility. Yet he was born into a Green Bay under British control and grew up under U.S. control. During the War of 1812 Grignon led a Menominee company alongside British troops which defeated U.S. troops in the Battle of Prairie du Chien, yet later he led Menominee alongside U.S. troops in the Black Hawk War. He was a fur trader through the decline of the fur trade. His portrait shows him wearing an Andrew Jackson-era waistcoat and cravat, a shelf of books at his elbow, with a tomahawk in his lap. His wife Nancy was half Menominee, and a guest at a Grignon wedding in 1824 wrote, "The bride was dressed in white muslin; on the table for supper were all kinds of wild meat - bear, deer, muskrat, raccoon, turkey, quail, pigeon, skunk and porcupine with the quills on." Yet his children attended Lawrence University and married Anglo-Americans.
