= Treaty of Washington, with Menominee (1831) =

1831 treaty between the United States and Menominee

The Treaty of Washington (1831) was a treaty between the Menominee (an American Indian tribe) and the United States Government. The treaty was initially made and signed on February 8, 1831 in Washington, D.C. In the treaty, the Menominee ceded about 2,500,000 acres (10,000 km^{2}; 3,900 sq mi) of their land in Wisconsin primarily adjacent to Lake Michigan. During the ratification of the treaty in June 1832, the United States Senate modified the treaty to provide additional land for the Stockbridge-Munsee tribe. The Menominee Tribe did not agree to the changes, and the treaty was renegotiated on October 27, 1832 to resolve the differences. These two treaties are commonly referred to singularly as the Treaty of Washington.

== Initial treaty ==
The treaty was first brought about by Colonel Samuel C. Stambaugh, the Indian agent at Green Bay. The principal Menonminee Chief was Oshkosh, who did not attend the treaty negotiation due to his belief that without his presence, the treaty would not be binding on the tribe. The head chief that attended the talks for the tribe was Iometah, who was shown signing the treaty as Aya-mah-taw, while the United States was represented by John H. Eaton, the Secretary of War. The negotiations concluded on February 8, 1831, ceding 2,500,000 acres (10,000 km^{2}; 3,900 sq mi) to the United States in return for clothing, provisions and annuities totaling approximately US$92,000. In addition, approximately 500,000 acres (2,000 km^{2}; 780 sq mi) were to be transferred to the Stockbridge-Munsee tribe for which the Menominee were to be paid an additional US$20,000.

In the winter of 1831, a group of Indians including Oneida chief Daniel Bread travelled to Washington to protest the treaty, which had bypassed the interests of the Oneida people. President Andrew Jackson agreed to adjust the assignment of lands to the Oneida in response.

== Ratification and second treaty ==
In June 1832 the treaty was ratified by the United States Senate. The Stockbridge-Munsee tribe was unhappy with the treaty as it was written, and had lobbied the New York senators to amend the treaty. The Senate did so, and George B. Porter, the Governor of the Michigan Territory was directed to gain the consent of the Menominee tribe to the changes. The tribe refused to agree to the changes, and a subsequent treaty was negotiated, being signed on October 27, 1832. After the modifications were negotiated and agreed to by both tribes and the United States, the treaty was again submitted to the Senate and ratified in 1833. Collectively both treaties are referred to as the singular "Treaty of Washington."

== See also ==
- Treaty of the Cedars (1836)
