= Rudolph Grotto Gardens =

Father Wagner Memorial Museum
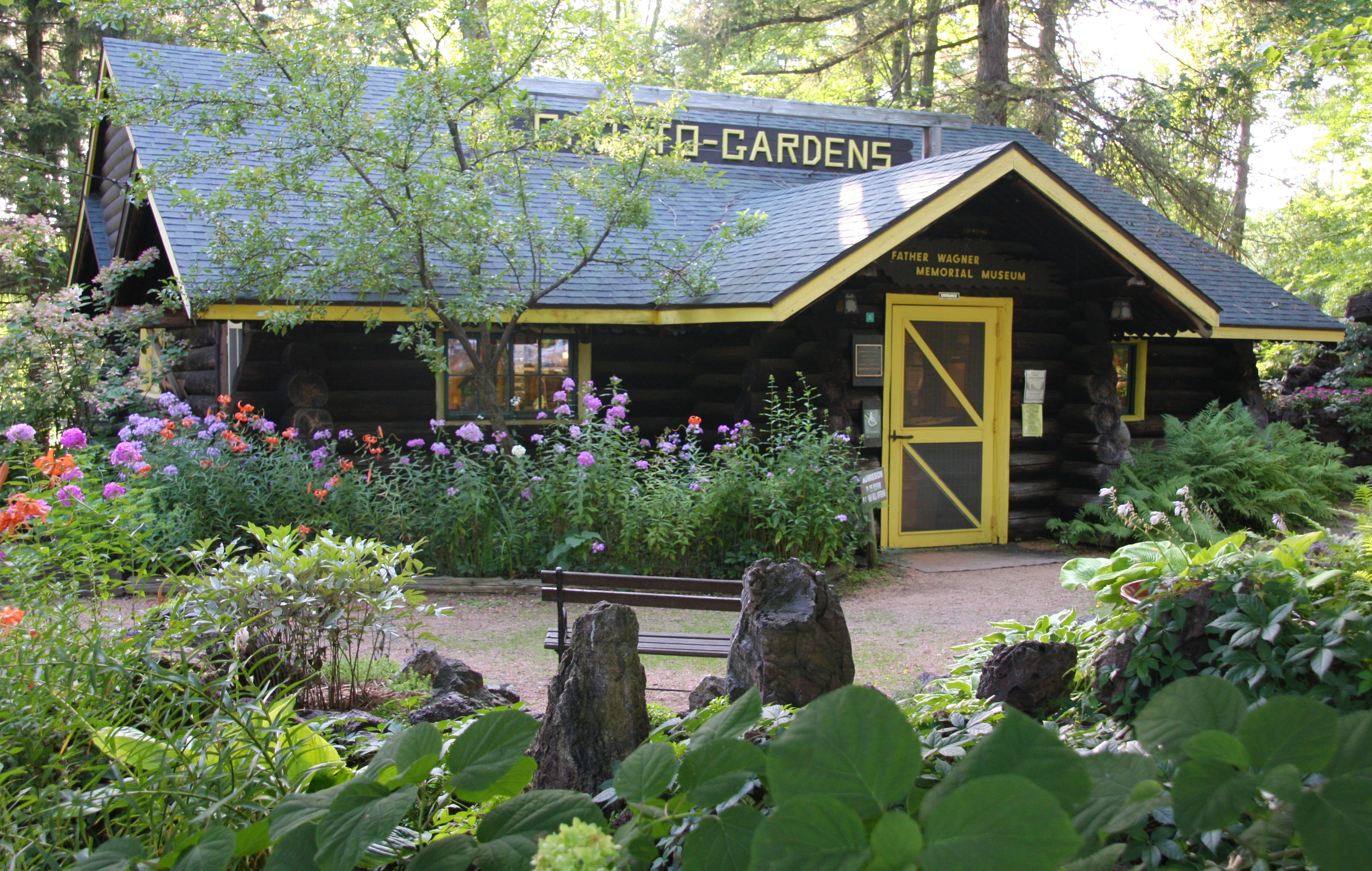
- Location: Rudolph, Wisconsin
- Coordinates: 44.499°N 89.802°W
- Type: History Museum
- Website: Rudolph Grotto Gardens

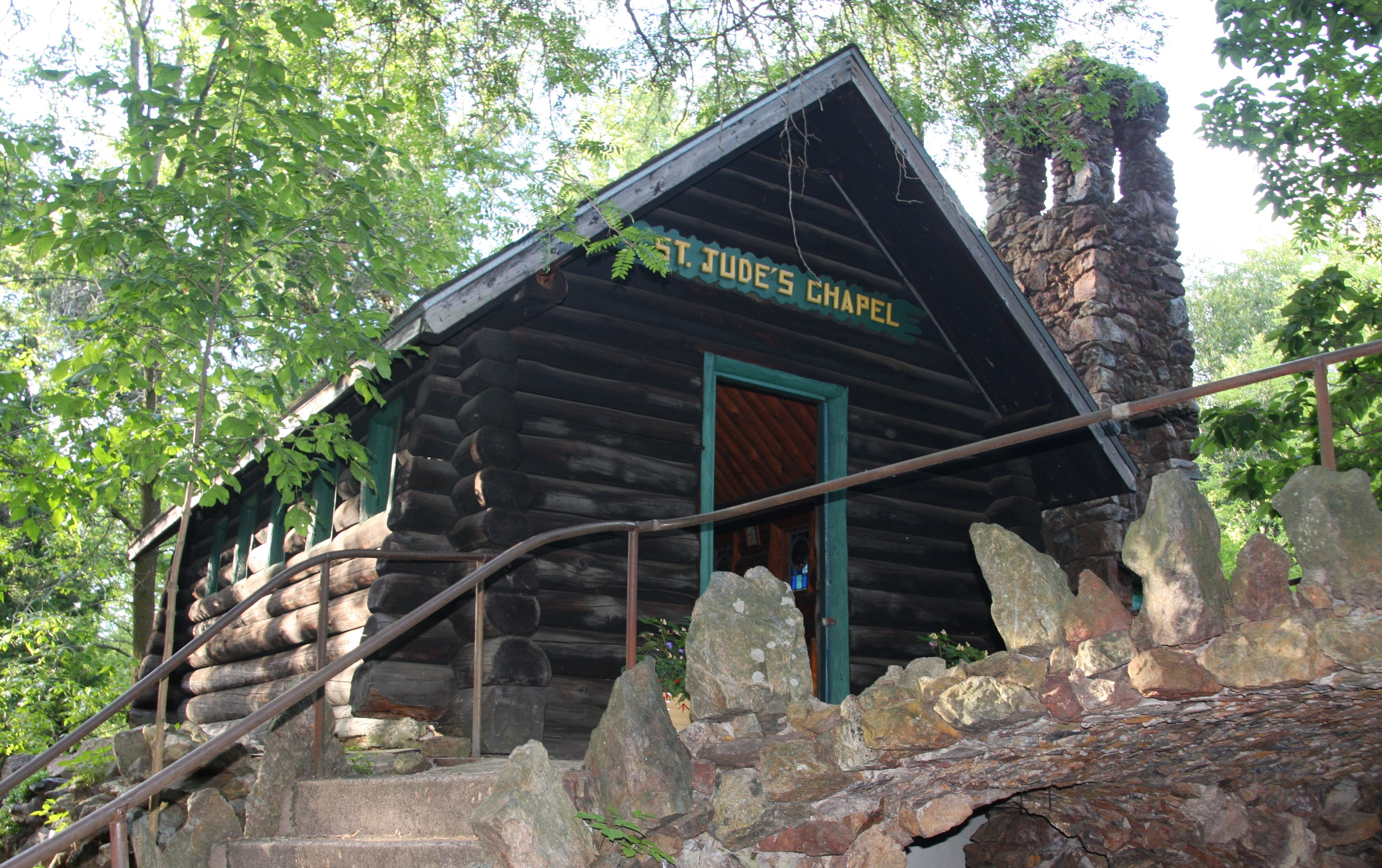
St. Jude's Chapel above the Wonder Cave at the Rudolph Grotto Gardens

The Rudolph Grotto Gardens is a religious site in Rudolph, Wisconsin. It features ornamental and devotional artificial grottoes, including the Wonder Cave, an above-ground tunnel constructed of vernacular stone in the twentieth century by Father Philip Wagner and Edmund Rybicki. The site contains twenty-six shrines and is covered with gardens and paths. The Father Wagner Memorial Museum is also on the site.

== Gardens ==
The Grotto Gardens are 7.5 acres of land containing a number large number of plants, notably hostas as well as religious shrines including the Stations of the Cross. A 78-ton rock was excavated by volunteers and raised to ground level by the local government to form part of a patriotic memorial at the site.
