= Treaty of Lake Poygan =

The Treaty of Lake Poygan arranged for the sale of 4,500,000 acres (18,000 km^{2}) of Menominee Native American lands in Wisconsin to the government of the United States for $350,000 plus 600,000 acres (2,400 km^{2}) in Crow Wing County, Minnesota, west of the upper Mississippi River, to which the Menominee were asked to move. It was negotiated on October 18, 1848, at Lake Poygan, near Winneconne, Wisconsin.

Most provisions of the treaty were not carried out, as in 1852 Chief Oshkosh persuaded President Millard Fillmore to permit the tribe to remain on its Wolf River lands in Wisconsin. Some 2,500 Menominee had refused to relocate west to Minnesota. The Menominee Indian Tribe of Wisconsin is federally recognized.
