= Grand Rapids, Wisconsin =

Town of Grand Rapids, Wisconsin
- Town
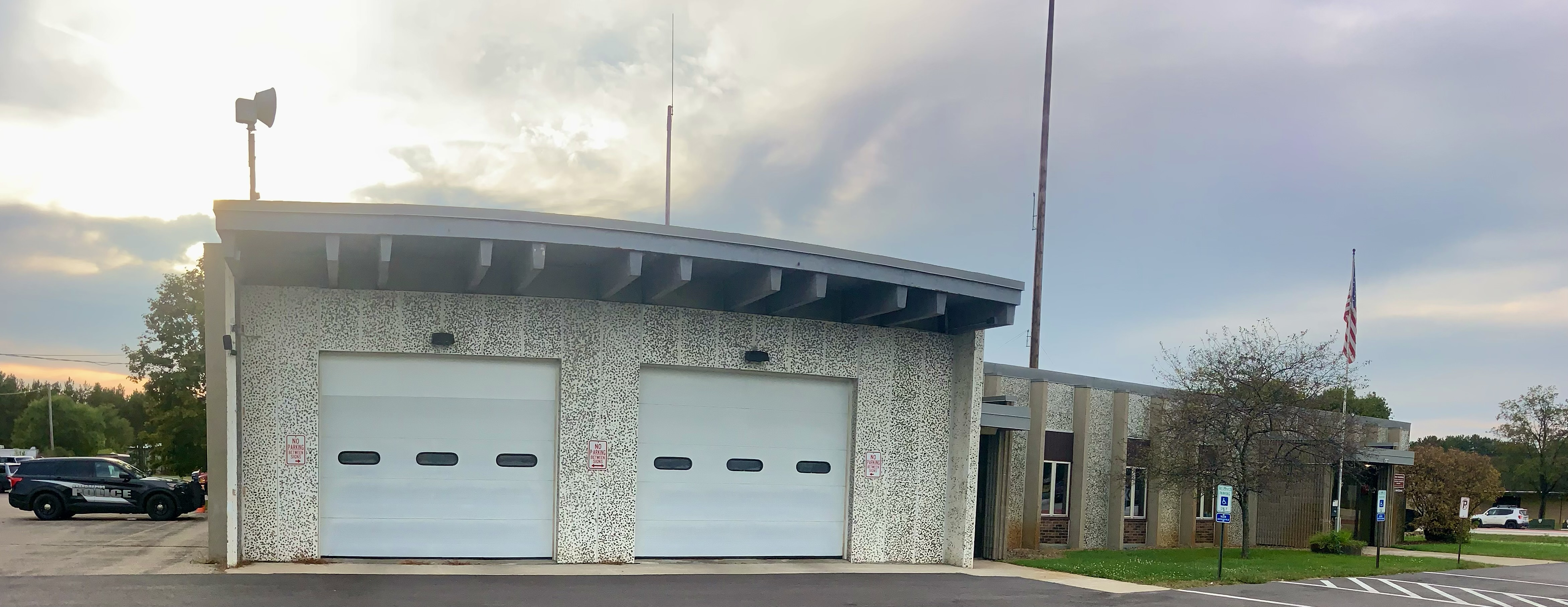
- Town hall

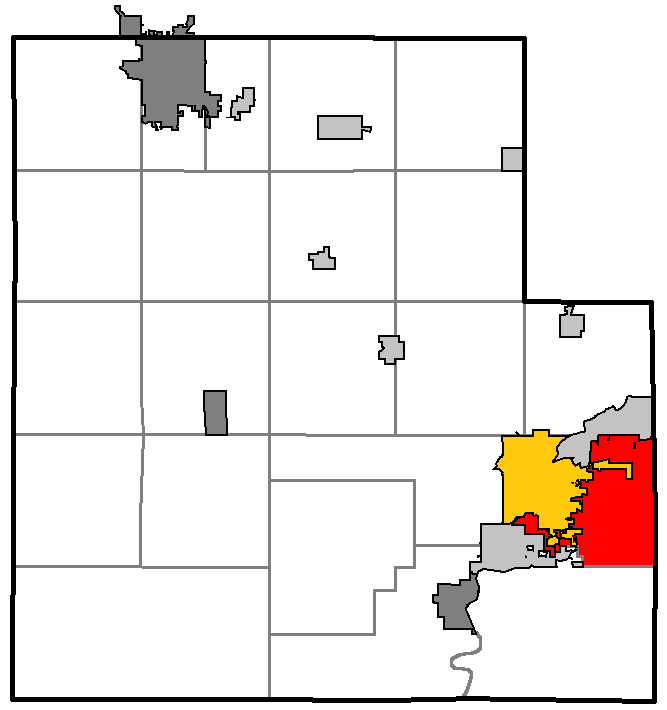
- Location of the Town of Grand Rapids, Wood County

- Location of Wood County, Wisconsin
- Coordinates: 44°22′2″N 89°46′24″W
- Country: United States
- State: Wisconsin
- County: Wood

Area
  - Total: 21.0 sq mi (54.4 km^{2})
  - Land: 20.8 sq mi (53.8 km^{2})
  - Water: 0.19 sq mi (0.5 km^{2})
- Elevation: 1,040 ft (317 m)

Population (2020)
  - Total: 7,576
  - Density: 365/sq mi (141/km^{2})
- Time zone: UTC-6 (Central (CST))
  - Summer (DST): UTC-5 (CDT)
- Area codes: 715 & 534
- FIPS code: 55-30125
- GNIS feature ID: 1583296
- PLSS township: eastern T22N R6E and parts of T22N R5E and T23N R6E
- Website: https://grandrapidswi.gov/

The Town of Grand Rapids is located in Wood County, Wisconsin, United States. The population was 7,576 at the 2020 census. The census-designated place of Lake Wazeecha is located in the town. The unincorporated community of Kellner is located also partially in the town.

== Geography ==
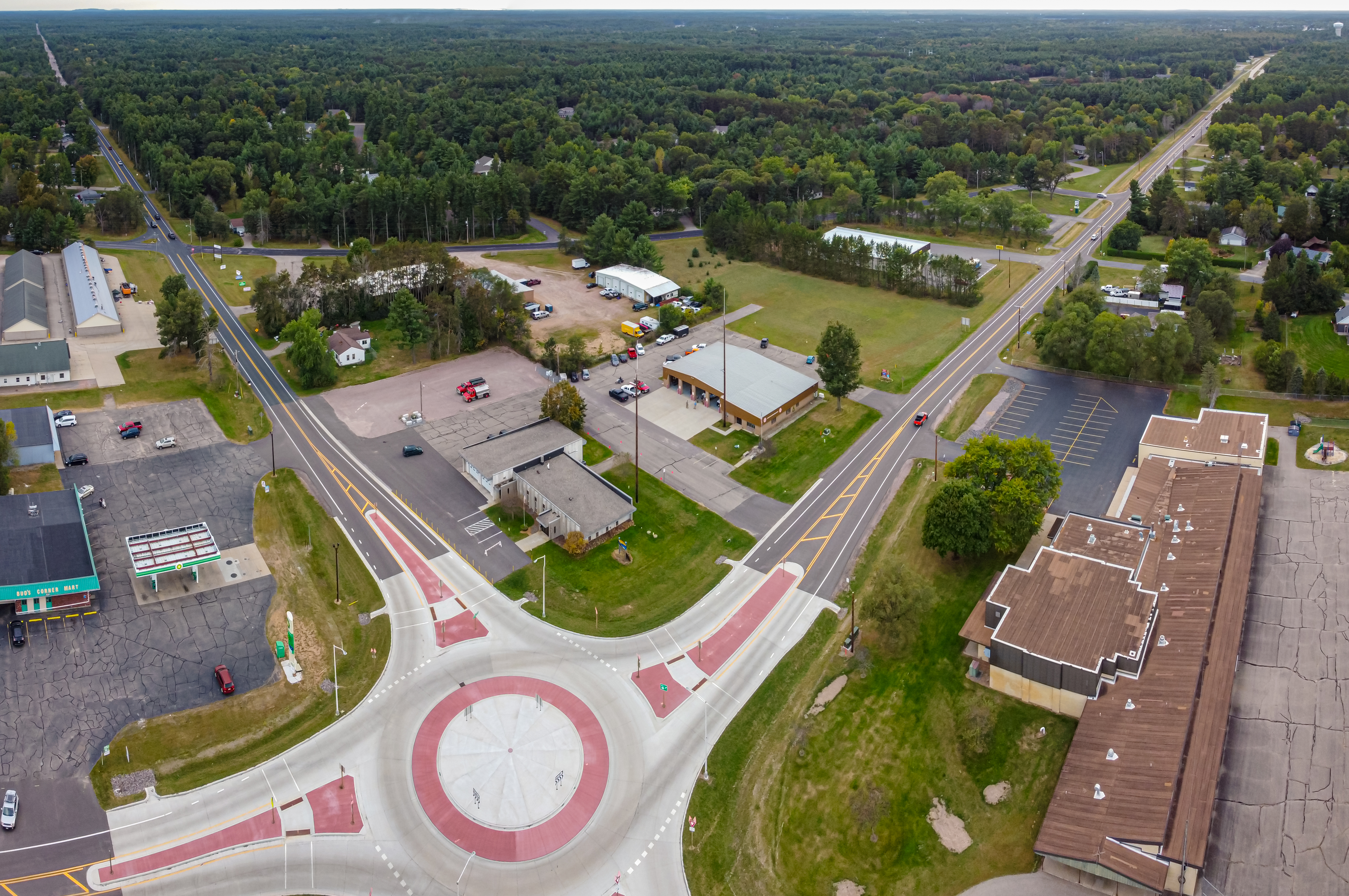

According to the United States Census Bureau, the town has a total area of 21 square miles (54.4 km^{2}), of which 20.8 square miles (53.8 km^{2}) is land and 0.2 square mile (0.5 km^{2}) (1%) is water.

== History ==
Grand Rapids takes its name from a series of rapids on the Wisconsin River.

The west and north part of what is now Grand Rapids, within three miles of the Wisconsin River, was in the "Indian strip," ceded by the Menominee to the United States government in the 1836 Treaty of the Cedars. As such, it was logged and surveyed earlier than the surrounding land. In the spring of 1840, a crew working for the U.S. government surveyed the section corners, walking through the woods and crossing the river, measuring with chain and compass. When done, they produced this first description of the area:

There is hardly any good land in this Township. A succession of Rapids & rocky chutes called the Grand Rapids have two Extensive lumbering Establishments thereon(?) owned by Bloomer Chambalain(?) Adams Strong Hill & others, now in operation - the Hydraulic Power is capable of being increased. Several large Pine Groves are found in this Township.

In 1851 a different crew resurveyed the section corners of the entire town, producing this general description:

The character of the land varies very considerably in this Town but none of it can rank above thirdrate. The Southern Portion consists of pine barrens, the timber mostly gone & grown up in Blk Oak bushes. The timber is principally pine of the variety known as Pitch, Bastard or Blk Pine, of very little use either for fuel or lumber. The north part of the Town is principally Marsh very wet & entirely unfit for cultivation. Large portions of the marshes are covered with Cranberry vines which every alternate year produce large crops.

== Demographics ==
As of the census of 2000, there were 7,801 people, 2,788 households, and 2,314 families residing in the town. The population density was 375.5 people per square mile (144.9/km^{2}). There were 2,854 housing units at an average density of 137.4 per square mile (53/km^{2}). The racial makeup of the town was 97.81% White, 0.24% African American, 0.51% Native American, 0.77% Asian, 0.04% Pacific Islander, 0.14% from other races, and 0.49% from two or more races. Hispanic or Latino people of any race were 0.81% of the population.

There were 2,788 households, out of which 41.3% had children under the age of 18 living with them, 75.9% were married couples living together, 4.8% had a female householder with no husband present, and 17% were non-families. 13.8% of all households were made up of individuals, and 3.7% had someone living alone who was 65 years of age or older. The average household size was 2.79 and the average family size was 3.08.

In the town, the population was spread out, with 28.6% under the age of 18, 5.2% from 18 to 24, 29.5% from 25 to 44, 28.2% from 45 to 64, and 8.5% who were 65 years of age or older. The median age was 38 years. For every 100 females, there were 102.3 males. For every 100 females age 18 and over, there were 101.3 males.

The median income for a household in the town was $62,515, and the median income for a family was $66,423. Males had a median income of $46,759 versus $27,364 for females. The per capita income for the town was $25,331. About 1.8% of families and 2.5% of the population were below the poverty line, including 1.2% of those under age 18 and 7% of those age 65 or over.

== Notable people ==
- D. D. Conway, lawyer and politician, lived and worked in the town of Grand Rapids
- Eliphalet S. Miner, judge and politician, was postmaster of the town
- Levi P. Powers, judge and politician, lived in the town
- Marlin D. Schneider, Democratic politician and teacher, longest serving member of the Wisconsin State Assembly, 1971–2011

== See also ==
- List of towns in Wisconsin
