= Henry Wildhagen =

American architect

Henry Wildhagen (September 1, 1856 – March 23, 1920) was one of northern Wisconsin's best-known architects at the turn of the 20th century.

He was born in the Kingdom of Hanover in 1856 and studied at the Technical University of Hannover. He immigrated to the US in 1886 and designed paper mills in the eastern U.S and Canada. He was married to Marie Wildhagen. In 1893 he came to Ashland and opened a design firm with civil engineer Herman Rettinghaus. There he designed many public buildings in northern Wisconsin.

A number of his works are listed on the U.S. National Register of Historic Places.

Works include:

- Ashland County Courthouse, 201 West 2nd Street, Ashland, Wisconsin, designed by Henry Wildhagen and H. W. Buemming, noted for its Classical Revival and Beaux-Arts architecture, NRHP-listed
- Ashland Middle School, Ashland
- Beaser School, 612 Beaser Avenue, Ashland (Wildhagen, Henry), NRHP-listed
- Ellis School, 310 Stuntz Avenue, Ashland (Wildhagen, Henry), NRHP-listed
- William and Susanna Geenen House, 416 North Sidney Street, Kimberly, Wisconsin (Wildhagen, Henry), NRHP-listed
- Mellen City Hall, corner of Bennett and Main Streets, Mellen, Wisconsin (Wildhagen & Reteauhaus), NRHP-listed
- Phillips High School, 300 Cherry St. Phillips, Wisconsin, NRHP-listed
- Royal Theatre, built 1914, 513 Main Street West, Ashland (Wildhagen, Henry)
- Washburn Public Library, built 1904, Classical Revival, corner of Washington Avenue and West 3rd Street, Washburn, Wisconsin (Wildhagen, Henry), NRHP-listed
- Wilmarth School, 913 3rd Avenue West, Ashland (Wildhagen, Henry), NRHP-listed
