= Ashland Middle School =

Ashland Middle School may refer to:

- Ashland Middle School in Ashland, Massachusetts
- Ashland Middle School, part of the Ashland School District (Oregon) in Ashland, Oregon
- Ashland Middle School (Ashland, Wisconsin)
