= Royal Theatre (Ashland, Wisconsin) =

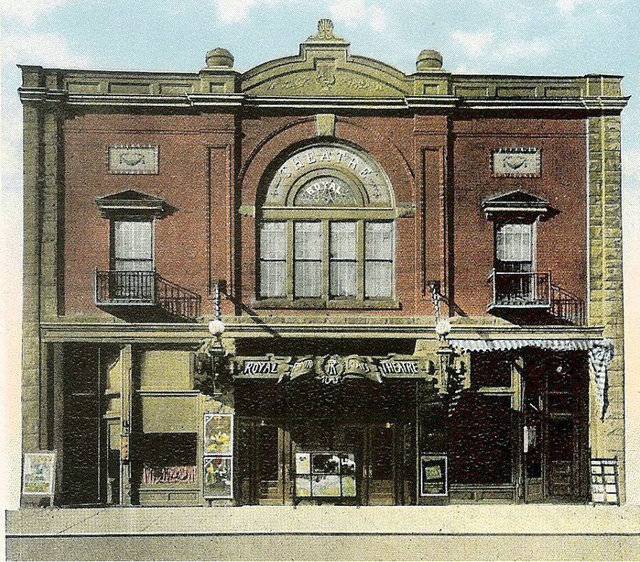
- The exterior of the Royal Theatre, as it originally appeared in 1914
- Address: 515 Main Street West; Ashland, Wisconsin; United States
- Type: Movie palace
- Current use: Vacant storefronts

Construction
- Opened: 1914
- Years active: 1914-1957
- Architect: Henry Wildhagen

The Royal Theatre is a historic theater in Ashland, Wisconsin, originally built as a vaudeville/movie theater in 1914. It was one of many theatres in Ashland to show silent films during that era.

The theater was built in 1914 and owned by Abe and Louis Latts, along with Leon Schwager. The building was designed by architect Henry Wildhagen, who designed buildings in northern Wisconsin, some of which are now listed on the National Register of Historic Places.

The building is a contributing resource within the West Second Street Historic District, of downtown Ashland.

The two-story brick building has a three-part symmetrical facade, which was designed in the Neoclassical Revival Style. The finely detailed facade is united by the metal entablature that features a protruding metal cornice, which has a central elliptical arch, a paneled frieze, and metal globes that stand at the top of the central pilasters in the brickwork. There are brownstone quoins at the sides, as well as brownstone window sills. Originally, there was a cast iron canopy over the central entrance, with ornate light fixtures on either side, and the name Royal Theatre embossed on the front.

A life-sized bronze sculpture of a lion on a marble pedestal in the lobby and lions were featured throughout the overall design and motif of the building.

An Art Deco marquee with neon letters was later added, and was removed after the theatre closed in 1957.

In the 1960s the building was converted into space for retail stores. The building survived a fire in the 1960s.
