= Wilmarth School =

- U.S. National Register of Historic Places
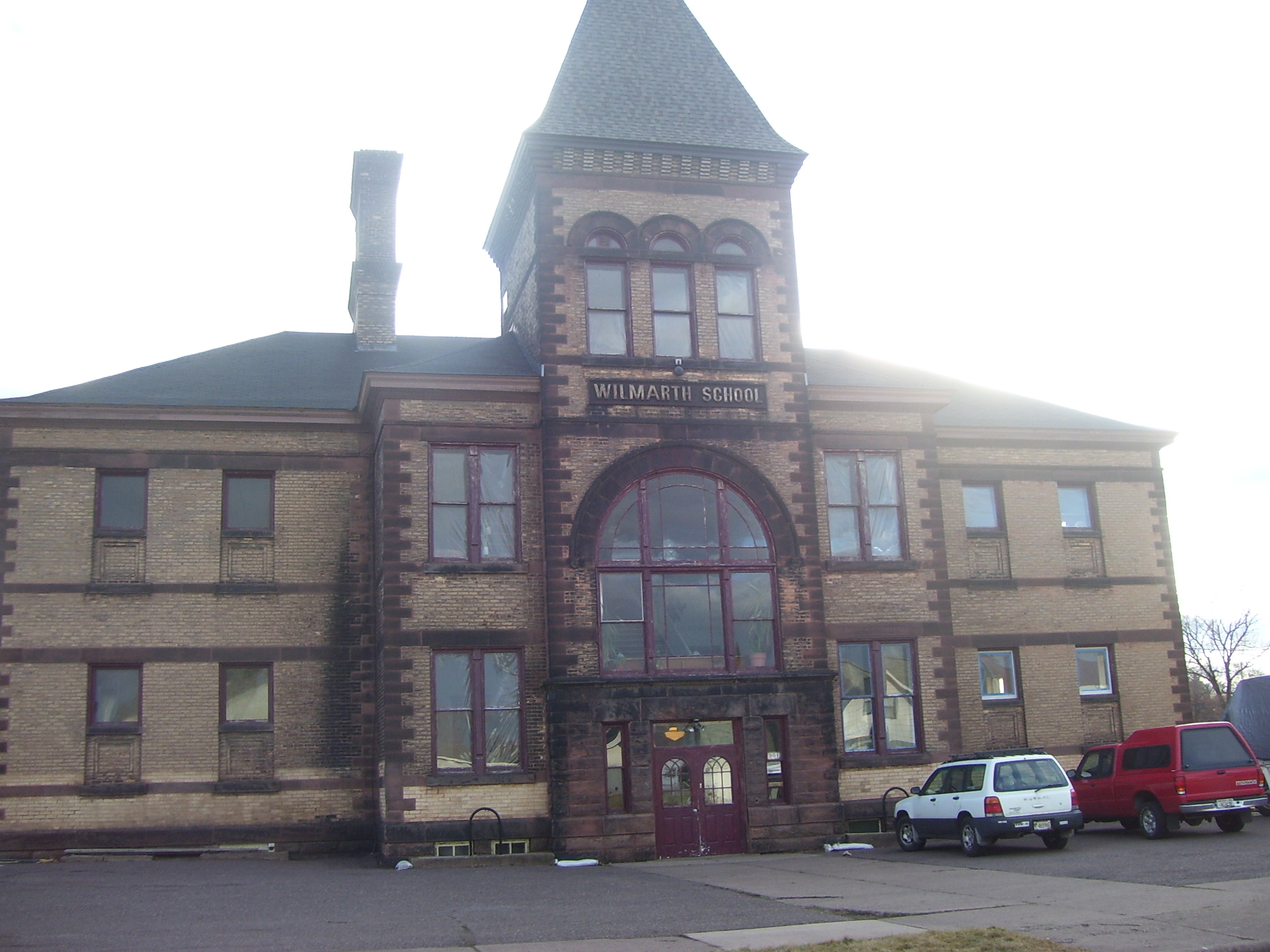

- Location within Wisconsin Location within the United States
- Location: 913 3rd Ave. W., Ashland, Wisconsin
- Coordinates: 46°35′1″N 90°52′48″W
- Area: less than one acre
- Built: 1891
- Architect: Henry Wildhagen
- Architectural style: Late 19th And 20th Century Revivals, Late Victorian
- MPS: Henry Wildhagen Schools of Ashland TR
- NRHP reference No.: 80000104
- Added to NRHP: July 17, 1980

Wilmarth School is a school building in Ashland, Wisconsin which was built in 1891. It was added to the National Register of Historic Places in 1980. It is noted for its architecture—the design of Henry Wildhagen—which is of the 19th- and 20th-century revival styles.

It is a two-story-plus-basement cream brick and brownstone building. It has a center "chisel-roof" tower containing the front entrance, which has a Palladian-like sidelights and stairlight. It has a stone panel with the school's name and three windows over a center arch. It has two large cream brick chimneys with corbelled caps and a hipped roof.

Wildhagen also designed three other schools in Ashland, also NRHP-listed: Ashland Middle School (1904), Beaser School (1899), and Ellis School (1900). (Note: The thematic resources document notes the four schools were built in 1895, 1899, 1900, and 1904, according to school records, without distinguishing which (page 5). However, Beaser School was 1899-built (page 4). Ashland Middle School was the "finally produced" one (page 5), hence must be 1904-built. Ellis is "closest in age" to the middle school (page 4), so it must be the 1900 one. It is noted that Wilmarth was built in 1895 (page 3).)
