= Ellis School =

- U.S. National Register of Historic Places
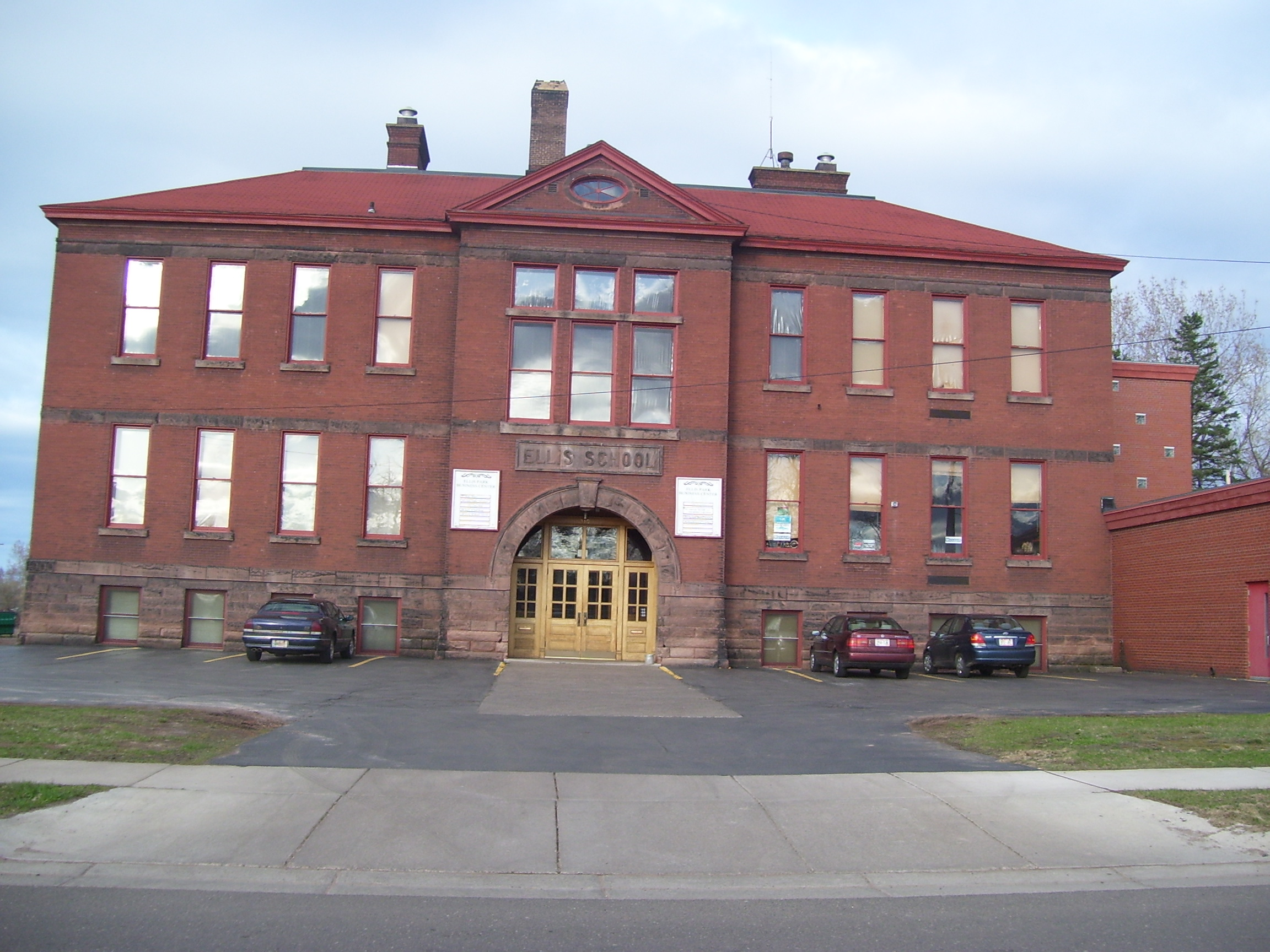

- Location within Wisconsin Location within the United States
- Location: 310 Stuntz Avenue; Ashland, Wisconsin
- Coordinates: 46°35′39″N 90°52′22″W
- Area: less than one acre
- Built: 1900
- Architect: Henry Wildhagen
- Architectural style: Late 19th And 20th Century Revivals
- MPS: Henry Wildhagen Schools of Ashland TR
- NRHP reference No.: 80000103
- Added to NRHP: July 17, 1980

Ellis School is a school building in Ashland, Wisconsin which was built in 1900. It was added to the National Register of Historic Places on July 17, 1980. It is noted for its architecture—the design of Henry Wildhagen—which is of the 19th- and 20th-century revival styles.

It is a two-story-plus-basement Neoclassical building. A 1979 architectural review described it as follows:

"...simple, rectangular mass is varied only by a projecting center pedimented pavilion, cut by a Neoclassical arch over the entrance. The brownstone voussoirs and keystone of the arch and the basement story contrasted with the brick walls relate to the materials of the other schools. Although the grand arch and triple-window motif is again used to mark the story over the entrance, the omission of overt Richardsonian Romanesque references make the Ellis School unique among its fellows. Distribution of double-hung windows to either side of the center pavilion is regular, with four to each side. An elliptical window is set into the center pediment which intersects the low pyramidal roof."

Wildhagen also designed three other schools in Ashland which are also NRHP-listed: Ashland Middle School (1904), Beaser School (1899), and Wilmarth School (1895). (Note: The thematic resources document notes the four schools were built in 1895, 1899, 1900, and 1904, according to school records, without distinguishing which (page 5). However, Beaser School was 1899-built (page 4). Ashland Middle School was the "finally produced" one (page 5), hence must be 1904-built. Ellis is "closest in age" to the middle school (page 4), so it must be the 1900 one. Wilmarth is noted to have been built in 1895.)
