= Fox River (Green Bay tributary) =

River in Wisconsin, United States

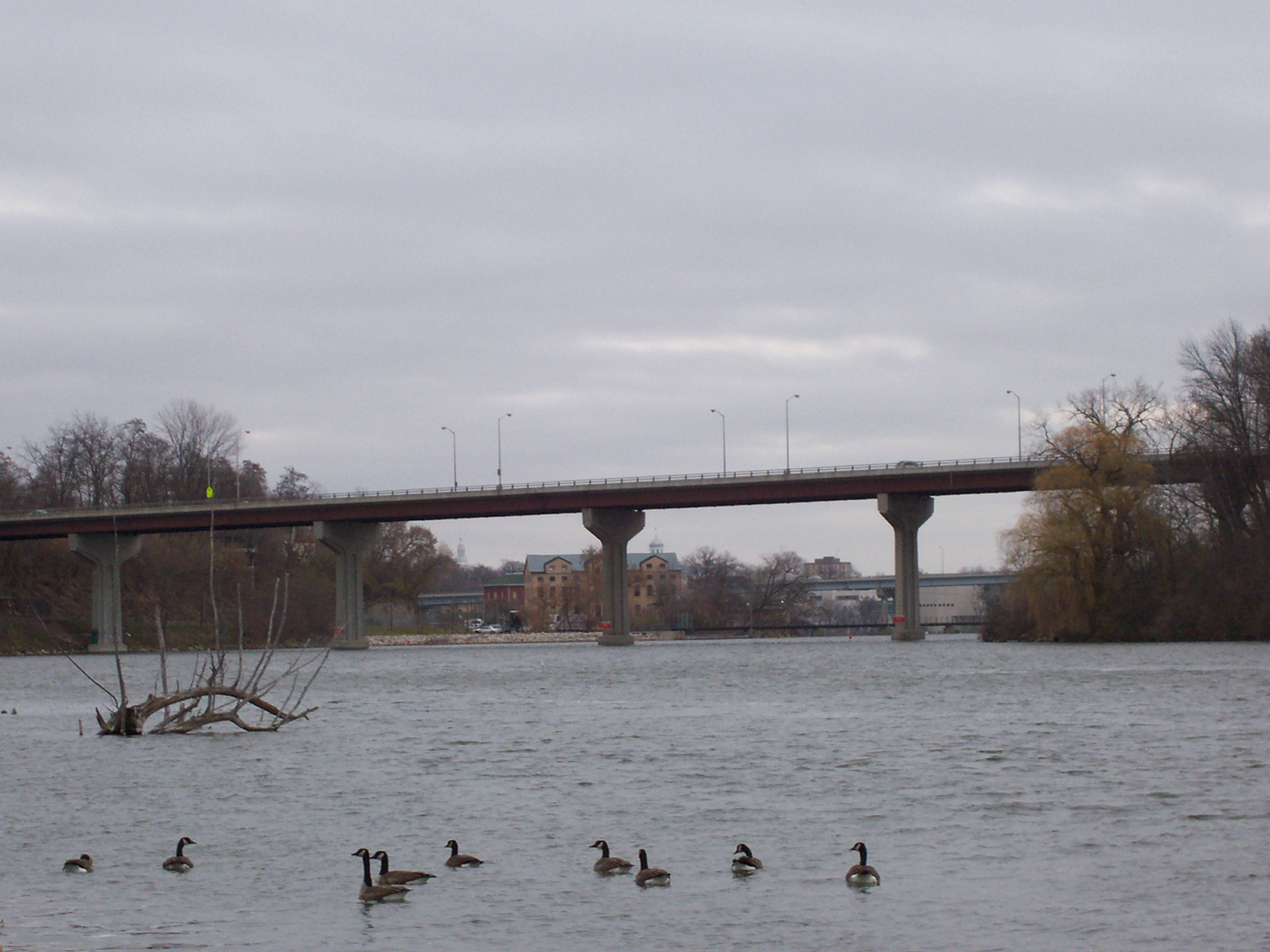
- The Wisconsin Highway 47 bridge over the Lower Fox River in Appleton

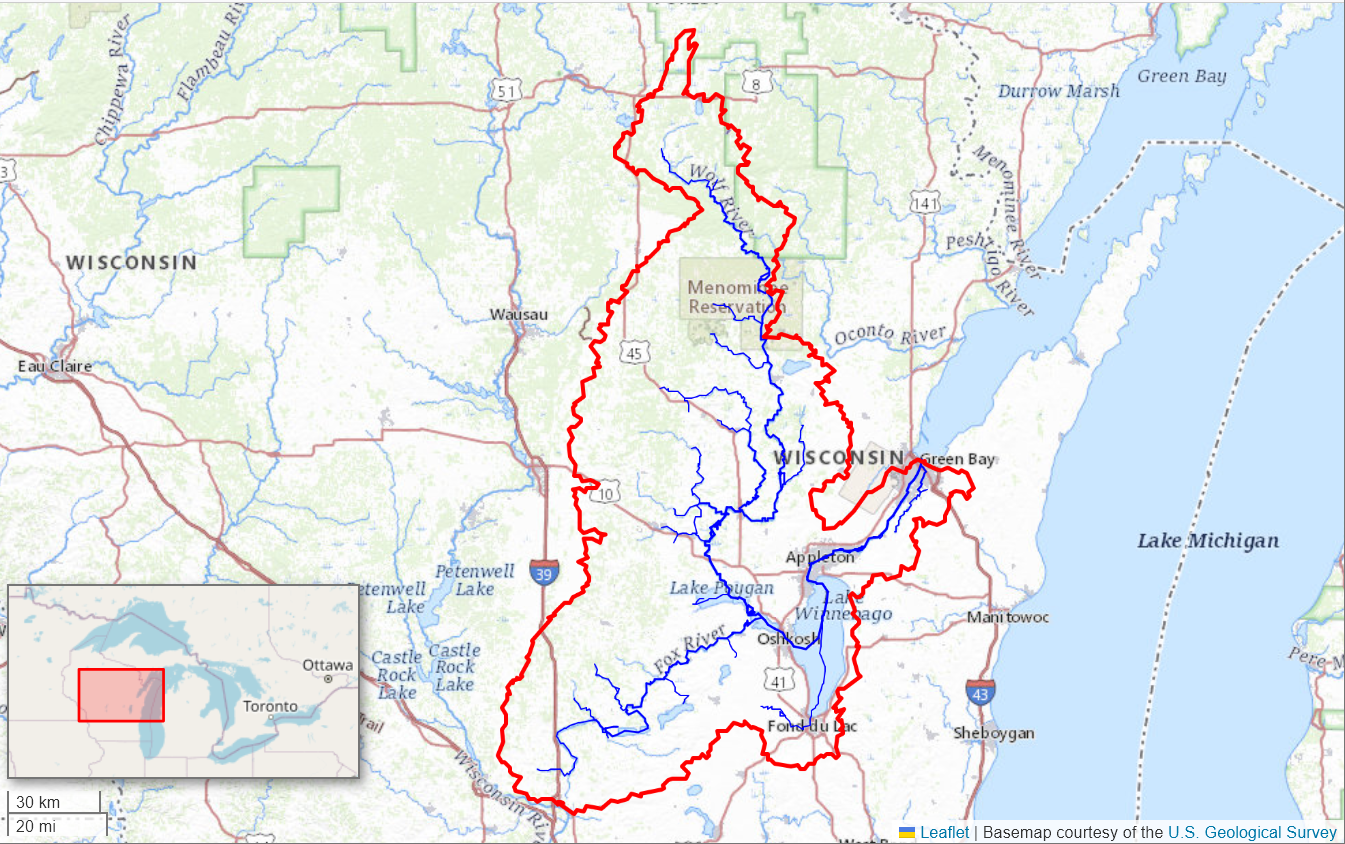
- Map of the Fox River watershed

Location
- Country: United States
- State: Wisconsin

Physical characteristics
- Source: Near Friesland
  - coordinates: 43.615°N 89.068°W
  - elevation: 890 ft (270 m)
- Mouth: Green Bay / Lake Michigan
  - coordinates: 44.54°N 88.005°W
  - elevation: 577 ft (176 m)
- Length: 200 mi (320 km)
- Basin size: 6,429 sq mi (16,650 km^{2})
- Discharge
  - average: 4,132 cu ft/s (117.0 m^{3}/s)

Basin features
- River system: St. Lawrence River system
- Tributaries
  - left: Wolf River

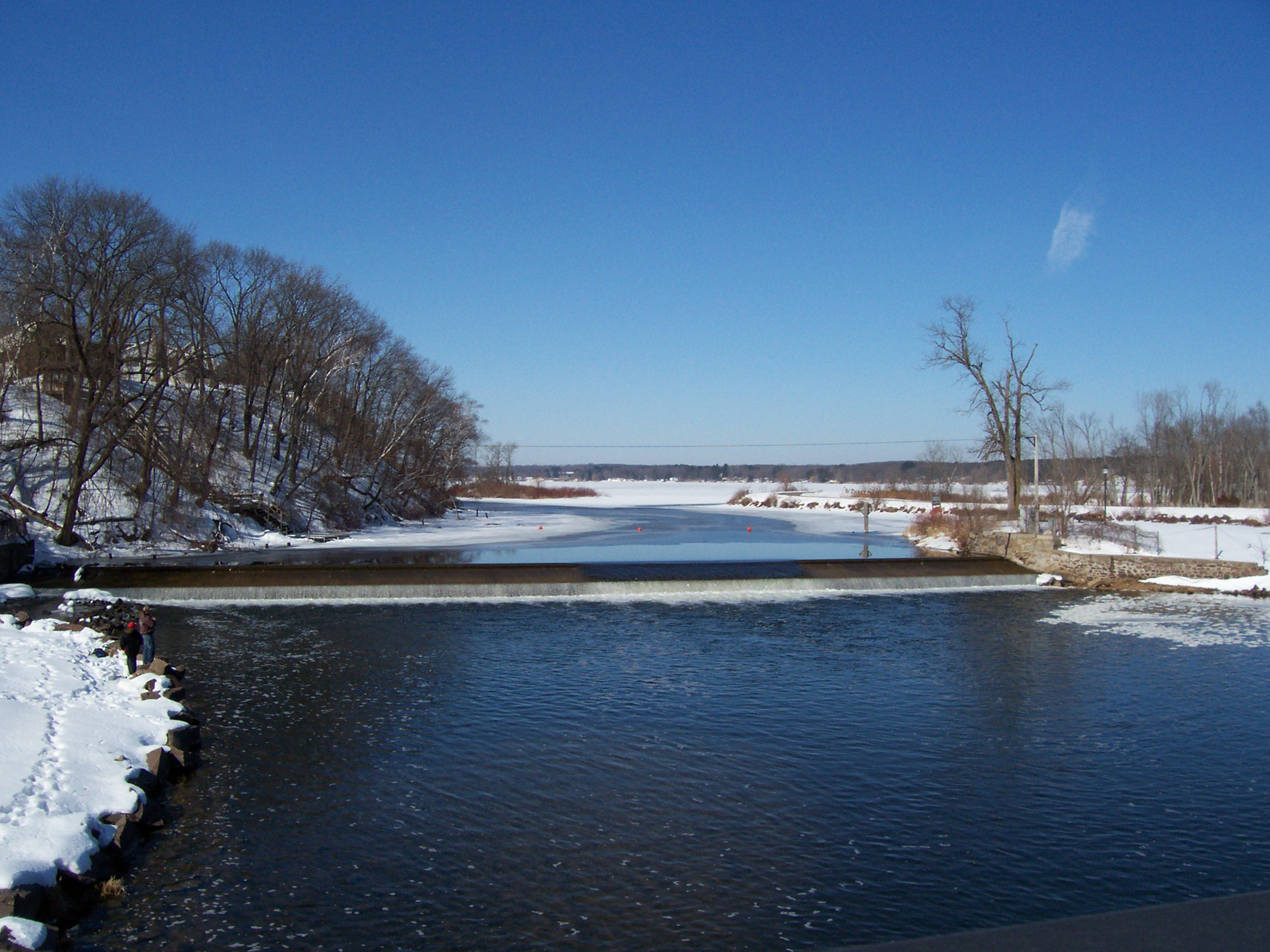
Looking west toward Buffalo Lake in Montello

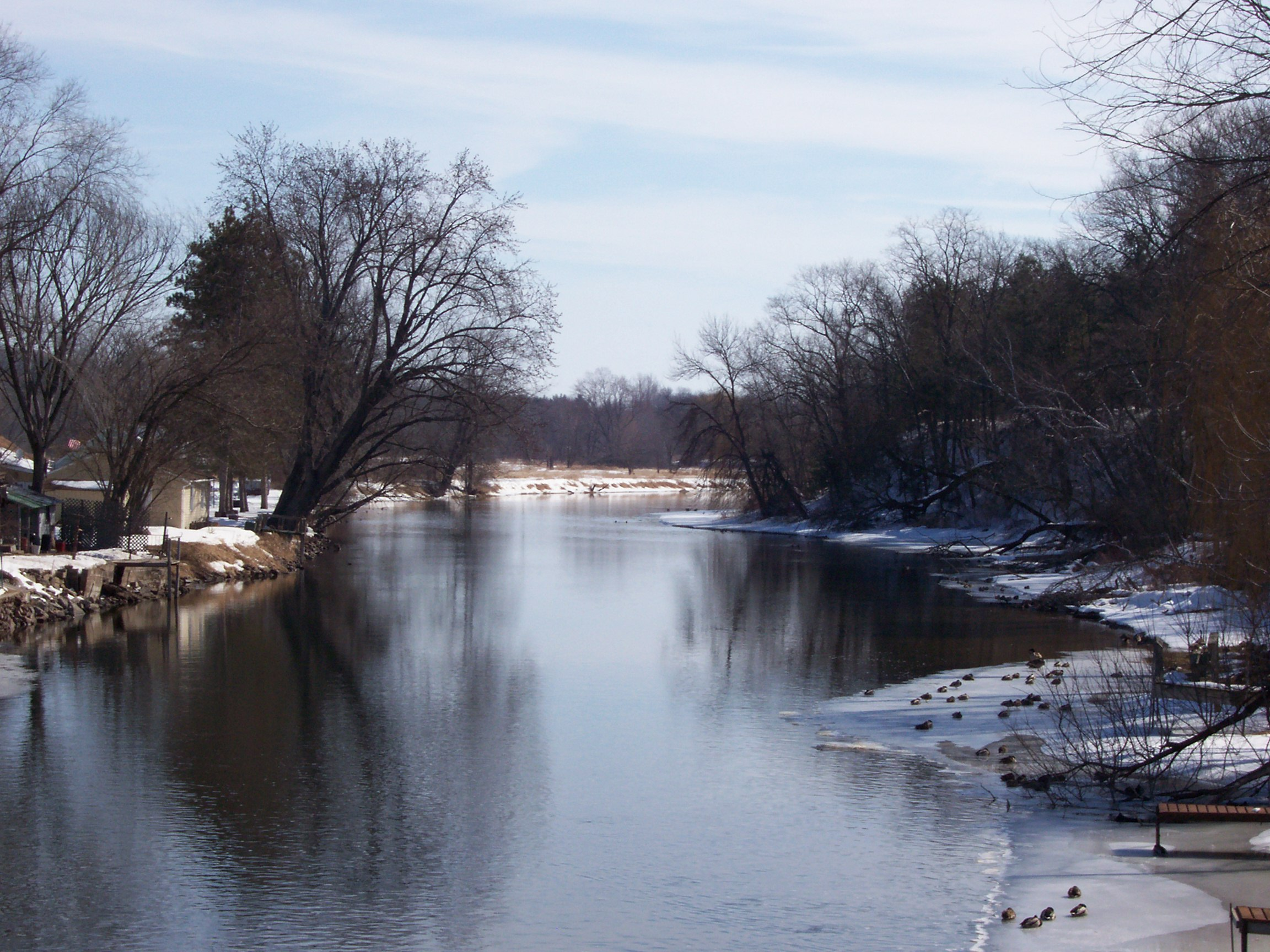
Looking east at the Upper Fox River in Montello

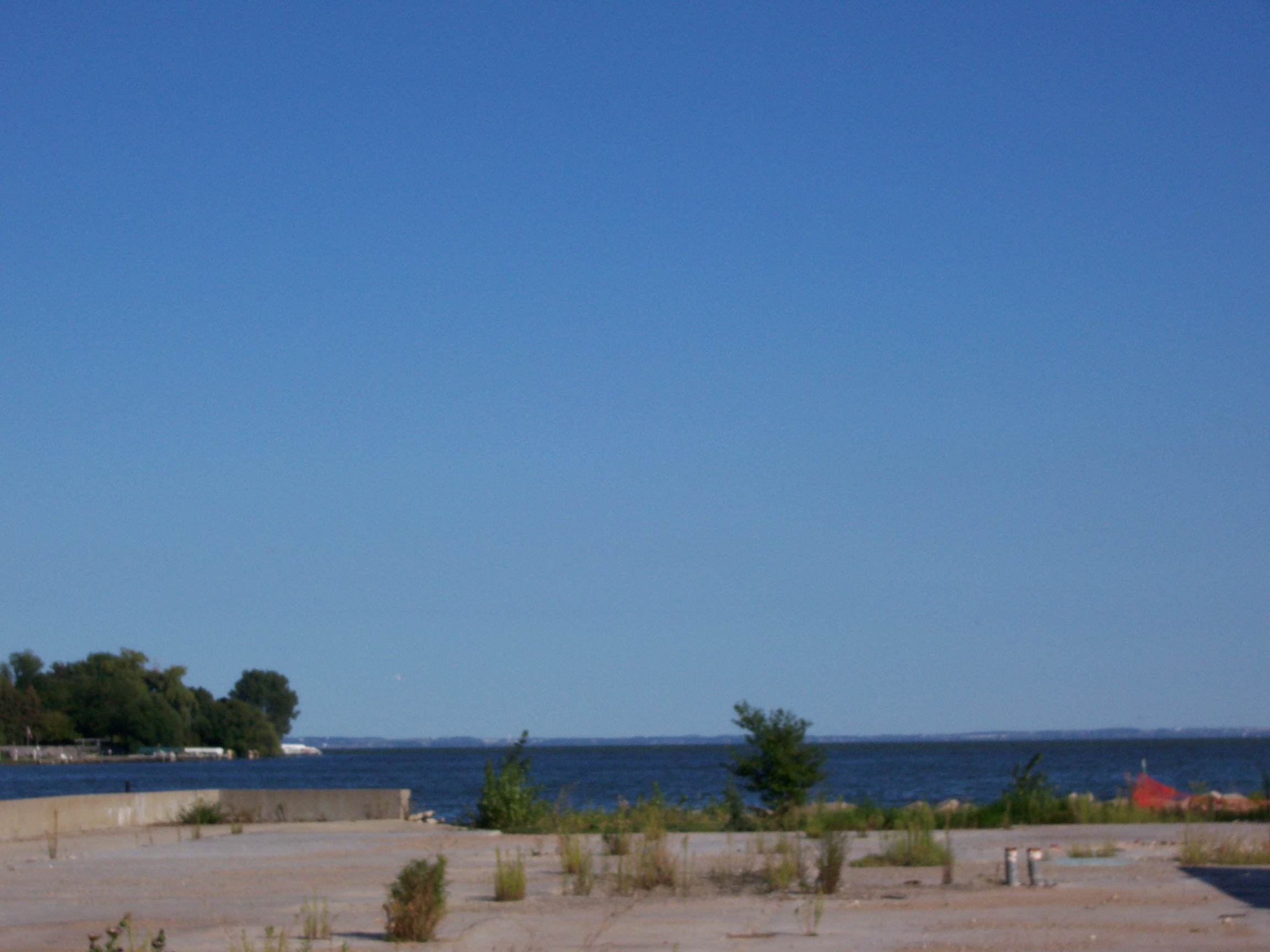
The Upper Fox River emptying into Lake Winnebago at Oshkosh

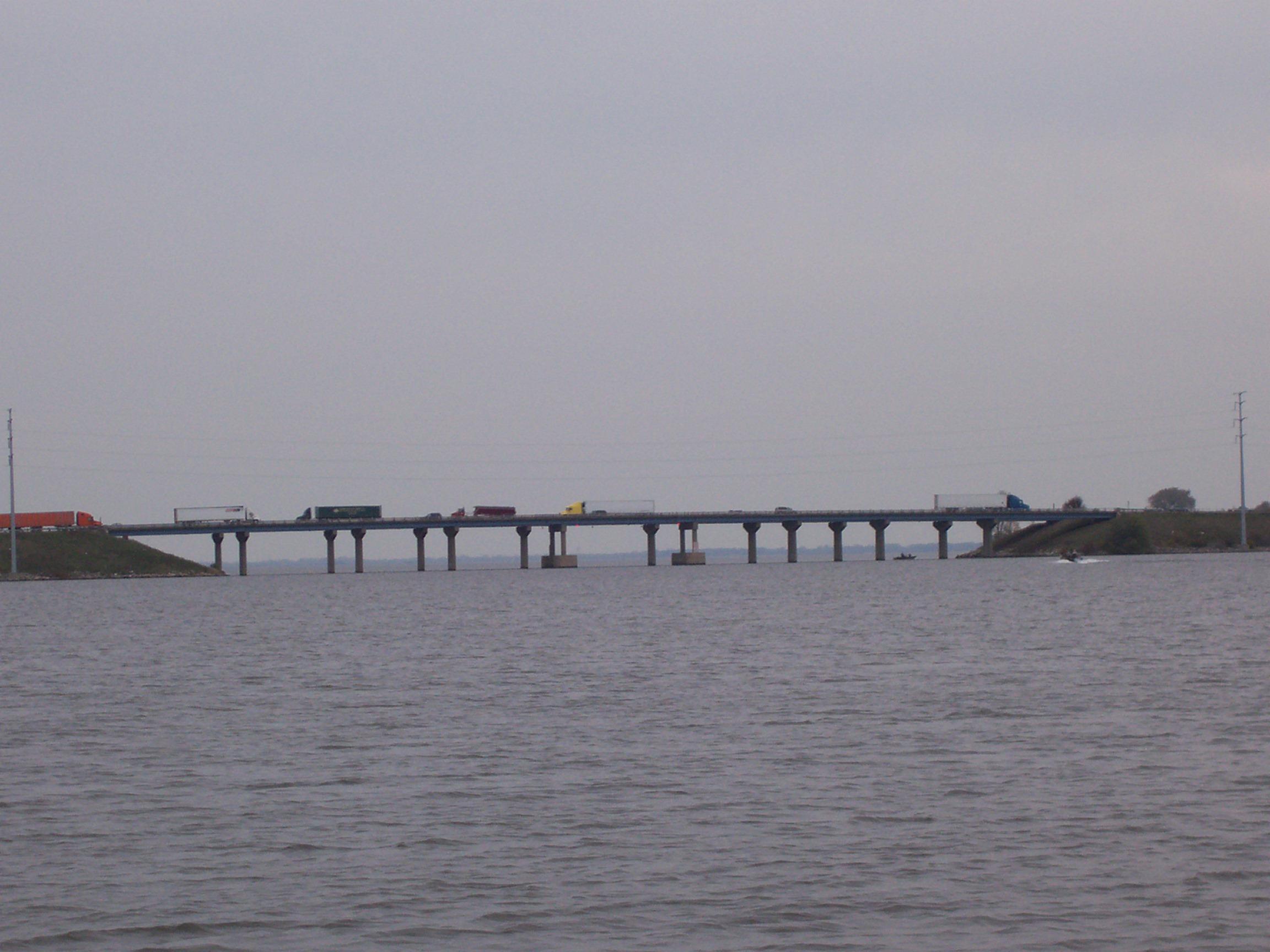
The Interstate 41 bridge over the Lake Butte Des Morts just north of the river's entry into Lake Winnebago

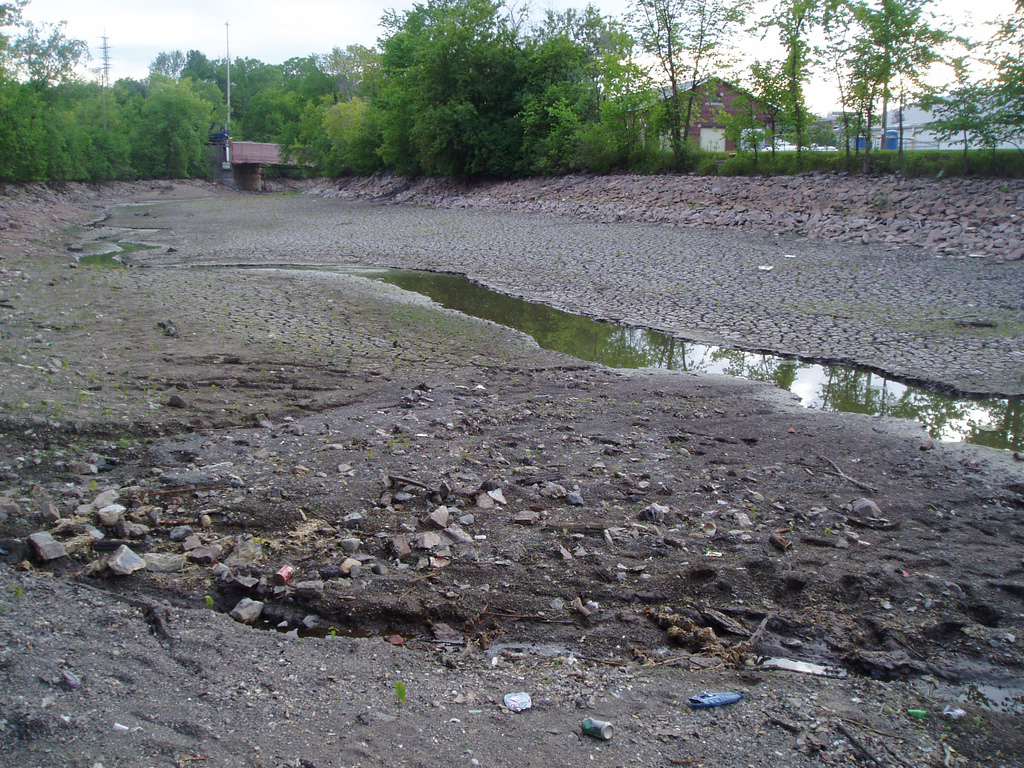
The bed of the Lower Fox River in Appleton during bridge repairs

The Fox River (Menominee: Meskwahkīw-Sīpiah, "Red Earth River"; Ho-Chunk: Nionigera) is a river in eastern Wisconsin in the Great Lakes region of the United States, flowing through the ancestral homeland of the Menominee and Meskwaki peoples. Unusually, the Fox River flows northward—from its headwaters in south-central Wisconsin toward Green Bay and Lake Michigan—a direction resulting from the landscape formed by receding glaciers at the end of the last ice age. Indigenous peoples have inhabited the Fox River valley for at least 13,000 years, since the recession of those glaciers. Prior to European settlement in the late 17th century, the shores of the Fox River and Green Bay were home to roughly half of the estimated 25,000 Native Americans living in present-day Wisconsin.

The river's English name is a translation of Rivière aux Renards (French for "River of the Foxes"), given by explorers Louis Jolliet and Jacques Marquette because it flowed through the territory of the Meskwaki people, whom the French called Renards. The Meskwaki call themselves Meshkwahkihaki, meaning "the Red-Earths."

The Fox River is the principal tributary of Green Bay, and via the bay, the largest tributary of Lake Michigan. The city of Green Bay, one of the first European settlements in the interior of North America, is on the river at its mouth.

== Course ==
The Upper Fox River begins as a small stream northeast of Pardeeville. It flows west by southwest towards Portage where it comes within two miles (3.2 km) of the Wisconsin River before turning north. The Fox River and the Wisconsin River are connected via the Portage Canal, which was the first waterway between the Great Lakes and the Mississippi River. After flowing past Montello, the river goes northeasterly until reaching Lake Butte des Morts. Here it is joined by the tributary Wolf River before entering the west side of Lake Winnebago at Oshkosh. The Upper Fox flows for a total of 142 miles (229 km).

The Lower Fox begins at the northern end of Lake Winnebago, where it flows north past Neenah, Menasha, and Appleton as it begins its 40-mile (64 km) course northeast towards Lake Michigan. The river drops around 164 feet (50 m) over this short stretch. Prior to the construction of a system of locks and dams after 1850, the river had many sizable rapids. The Lower Fox ends after flowing through the city of Green Bay and into Lake Michigan through the Green Bay.

== Hydrology ==
Altogether, the Fox-Wolf watershed drains an area of about 6,429 square miles (16,650 km^{2}). The Fox has an average annual discharge of 5,200 cubic feet per second (150 m^{3}/s) into the Green Bay. The highest recorded flow on the Fox near its mouth was 33,800 cubic feet per second (960 m^{3}/s) on June 3, 1990.

Tributaries of the Fox River include the East, Fond du Lac, Wolf, White, Mecan, Grand, and Montello rivers.

== Name ==
The name is the translation of Rivière aux Renards (French for "River of the Foxes"), given by explorers Louis Jolliet and Jacques Marquette because it went through the territory of the Meskwaki people, called Renards in French. In the Menominee language, the river is known as Meskwahkīw-Sīpiah, which means "Red Earth River". In the Ho-Chunk language (Winnebago, Hoocąk, Hocąk), Fox River is known as Nionigera. According to a member of the party of La Salle, it was also called the Kakaling River.

== Demographics ==
Along the banks is a chain of cities and villages, including Oshkosh, Neenah, Menasha, Appleton, Little Chute, Kimberly, Combined Locks, and Kaukauna. Except for Oshkosh, located on the Upper Fox River near Lake Winnebago, these cities and villages identify as the Fox Cities. Farther north along the Lower Fox River, from its outlet from Lake Winnebago and before its mouth at Lake Michigan, are the cities of De Pere and Green Bay (located at the lake), and the villages of Ashwaubenon and Allouez; although they are in the Fox River Valley, this grouping of cities and villages does not refer to themselves as Fox Cities.

== History ==
Since the recession of the glaciers that once covered much of Wisconsin, the Fox River has supported several Native American cultures, and has been important for its fisheries, waterfowl, wild rice, forests, and water. Archaeologists have claimed that indigenous peoples lived in the Fox River area as early as 7000 BC.

Prior to European settlement in the late 17th century, the shores of the Fox River and the Green Bay were home to roughly half the estimated 25,000 Native Americans who lived in what is today Wisconsin. The first Europeans to reach the Fox were French, beginning with explorer Jean Nicolet in 1634. In 1673 explorers Jacques Marquette and Louis Joliet canoed up the river as far as Portage. Here they made the short portage from the Fox to the Wisconsin River and then canoed on toward the Mississippi River. They established an important water route between the Great Lakes and the Mississippi River known as the Fox–Wisconsin Waterway. It was likely long used by Native Americans prior to European encounter, as they had extensive cross-country trading routes related to the Mississippi River.

During the French colonization of the Americas, this route was used frequently by fur traders. French-Canadian men who established homes on the Fox River married First Nation women, producing mixed-race descendants who were generally raised within the matrilineal cultures of their mothers and identified with the tribes. In Canada, the Métis of the Red River of the North are classified as a distinct ethnicity because of their shared culture.

=== Industrial Revolution ===
The Fox-Wisconsin Waterway's importance continued into the 1850s, when the Fox and Wisconsin Improvement Company built locks and dams on the Fox and the Portage Canal to connect it to the Wisconsin River at Portage. The company was hoping to establish Green Bay as a port city to rival Chicago by making the Fox-Wisconsin Waterway into the principal shipping route between Lake Michigan and the Mississippi River. This goal was never achieved, as the Upper Fox remained too shallow for significant shipping even after damming and dredging. In addition, the lakes that the narrow, winding stream flows through were frozen solid for five months every year.

The Lower Fox was developed instead as a center of riverfront industry. During the mid-19th century, when Wisconsin was a leading producer of wheat, several flour mills were built along the river to harness its abundant water power. During the 1860s, as Wisconsin's wheat production declined, these flour mills were replaced by a growing number of paper mills, which processed the great amount of timber being harvested from the forests. The Lower Fox proved an ideal location for paper production, owing to its proximity to lumbering areas that could supply wood pulp to make paper. Several well-known paper companies were founded in cities along the river, including Kimberly-Clark, Northern Paper Mills (makers of Quilted Northern), and the Hoberg Paper Company (manufacturer of Charmin).

The Vulcan Street Plant on the Fox river in Appleton was the first Edison hydroelectric station and one of the first in the world. It was put into service in 1882 within the building of the Appleton Paper and Pulp Company.

== Paper industry ==
The Lower Fox remains a major area for paper production. There are 24 paper and pulp mills along the Lower Fox River that produce more than five million tons of paper per year and employ around 50,000 people. The principal cities located in this valley are Green Bay, Appleton, Neenah, Menasha, De Pere, and Kaukauna. Although Oshkosh is a major city in the chain, active production of paper products is no longer located there.

== Environmental issues ==
In the section between Lake Winnebago and Green Bay at Lake Michigan, the Fox River flows roughly south to north and descends through a height equal to that of Niagara Falls. As such, the Fox River was an ideal location for constructing powerful sawmills that made the Fox River area famous for its paper industry. A negative side effect of this industrialization was the dumping of hazardous material by-products of the paper mills. To repair the ecological damage from this toxic waste, there has been a widespread effort to clean the Fox River. Dredging of the chemicals in the river began on April 28, 2009 and capping started soon after during the summer of 2009. The cleaning project concluded in 2020 and cost an estimated $1 billion. The Fox River will continue to be monitored by the Environmental Protection Agency and Wisconsin Department of Natural Resources for many years following the cleaning project's completion.

The high concentration of paper mills and other industry along the Lower Fox has historically been the source of much pollution of the river. Public debate about this contamination began as early as 1923, but little was done to improve the river until the federal Clean Water Act was passed in 1972. Much effort has since been put into cleaning the Fox, but problems still exist. According to some measures of pollution (e.g. dissolved oxygen, pollution-tolerant worm counts), the Lower Fox River is much cleaner than it was before 1972. However, according to other measures of pollution (e.g., phosphorus, estrogenic compounds, discarded pharmaceuticals), the river waters are slightly more contaminated than before 1972. As a result, debate over the river's contamination continues between environmentalists, the paper industry, Indian tribes, and elected officials at the federal, state, and local levels.

While not officially designated as a U.S. Superfund site, the Lower Fox River bottom has some sections contaminated with toxic chemicals. These contaminated sediments are the river's current environmental problem. One contaminant of special concern is a group of chemicals called Polychlorinated biphenyls or PCBs. The largest deposits of contaminated sediments are traceable to the local paper recycling mills. Beginning in the 1950s, many mills along to Fox River began producing and recycling carbonless copy paper. The Wisconsin Department of Natural Resources explains that carbonless copy paper caused PCB pollution in the Fox River and Lake Michigan. The federal government banned PCBs in 1979 due to their environmental threat to humans and other wildlife.

The U.S. government and State of Wisconsin filed suit on October 14, 2010, against nine paper companies and two municipalities for their failure to pay for PCB cleanup actions. The companies named in the suit were NCR Corporation, Appleton Papers, CBC Coating, Kimberly-Clark, Menasha Corporation, NewPage Corporation, Glatfelter, U.S. Paper Mills (Sonoco) and WTM (Wisconsin Tissue Mills). The local agencies sued were the City of Appleton and Neenah-Menasha Sewerage Commission. Several settlements ensured that the responsible parties paid for a large sum of the cleaning project costs and other restoration efforts. A settlement, reached in 2019, required that NCR Corporation, P.H. Glatfelter Company, and Georgia-Pacific Consumer Products LP cover the cost of all future cleaning efforts.

Since the late 19th century, dredging of river bottom sediments has been done to allow large ships to enter the Fox River. The contaminated sediment has been used since the 1960s to fill local wetlands, causing adverse effects on wildlife and plants. After 1978 it was used to develop an off-shore engineered holding area called Renard Isle, also known as Kidney Island. Renard Isle was capped in 2015 and its ownership was transferred to Brown County in 2017. There have been several proposed plans for the land, including turning it into a National Estuarine Research Reserve.

Among the wildlife in the Fox River Valley are birds such as mallard ducks and Canada geese, and fish such as walleye.

Before the 1950s parts of the Fox River were used for recreational purposes. This only lasted for a short period of time as the water quality deteriorated, and the water was considered unhealthy.

The Fox River region has been dominated by dairy farms that benefited from the rich soil and plentiful water supply.

== Recreation ==
The 25-mile (40 km) Fox River State Recreational Trail is part of the Brown County Park System. The trailhead is in the city of Green Bay where seven miles (11 km) of paved trail follow the Fox River south through the city of De Pere. Biking, walking, jogging, and rollerblading are among the most popular activities on the trail. The trail also has a section of unpaved terrain that permits horseback riding.

The Wiouwash State Trail runs concurrent with the Fox River from downtown Oshkosh to Lake Butte des Morts for about four miles (6.4 km).

=== Fishing ===
Fishing was a huge aspect of life on the water as many fisheries were set up along the river. This remained large for a short period of time but also was soon limited by water pollution and the depleted amount of fish. Restrictions were placed on how many and what kind of fish could be caught.

The Fox River has produced multiple state records in fishing. Currently the records for Striped bass, Shortnose gar and Northern hogsucker have all been caught in the river.

== Images ==
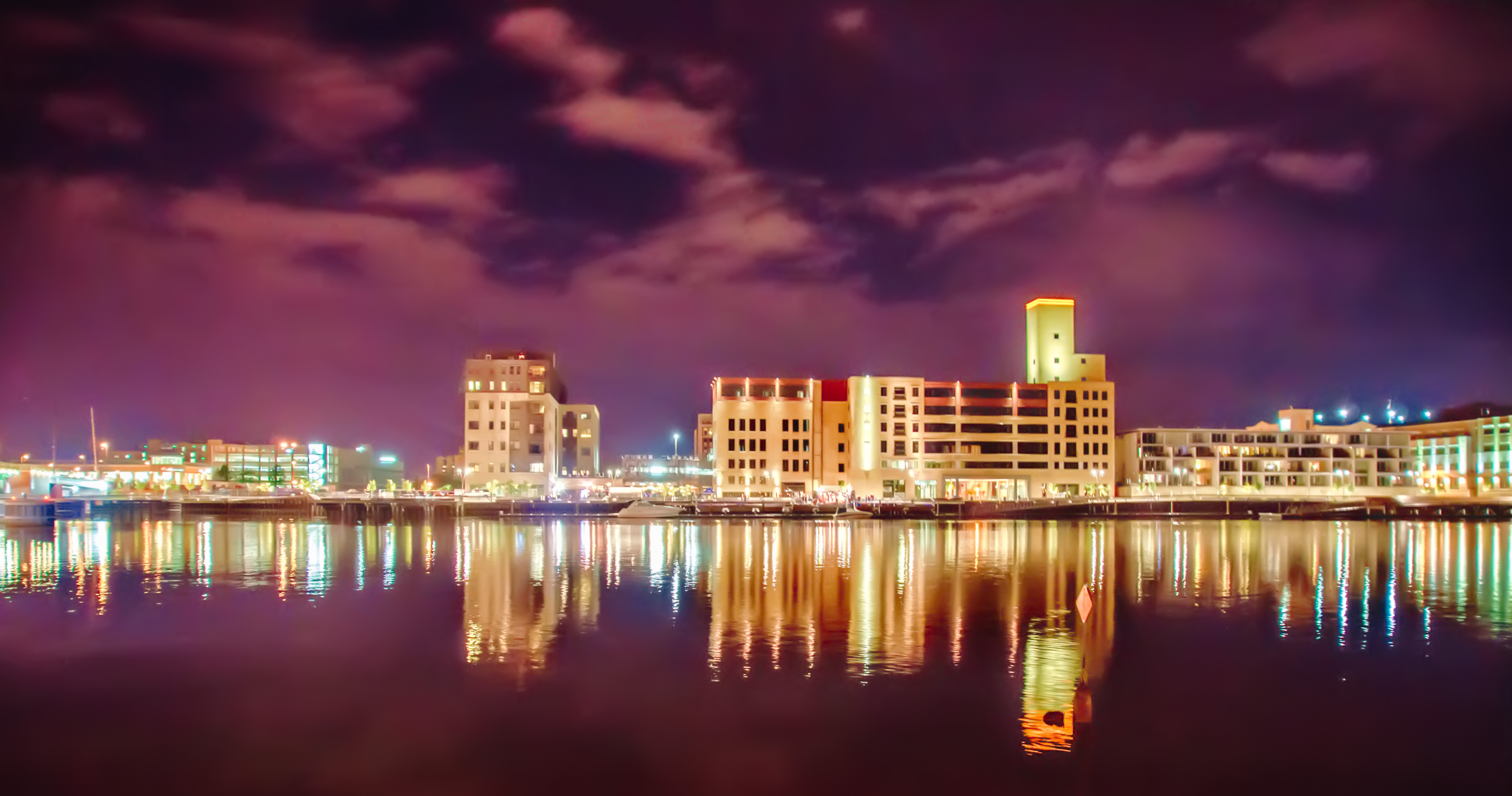
Facing east across the Fox River to downtown Green Bay.

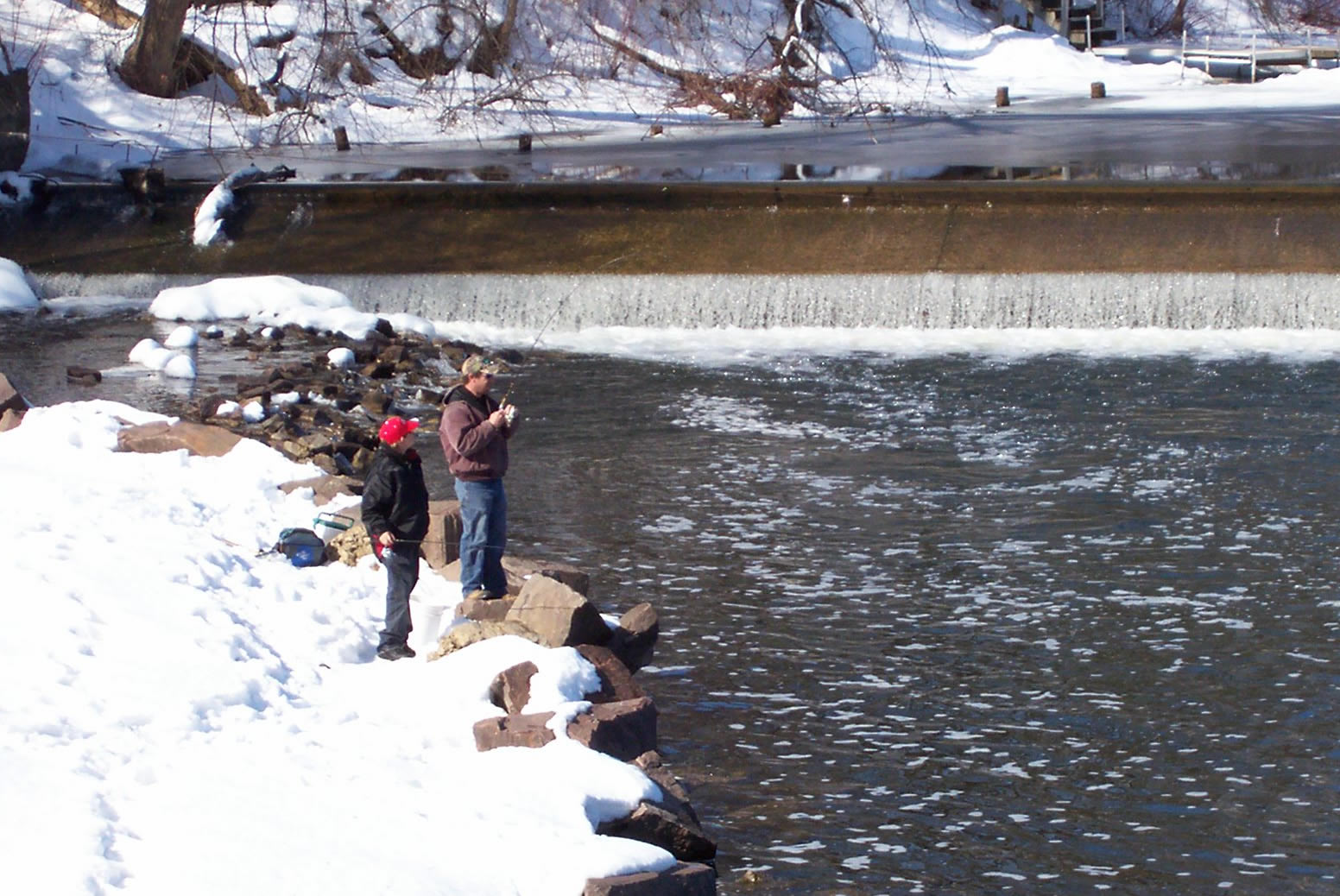
Fishermen in Montello, Wisconsin

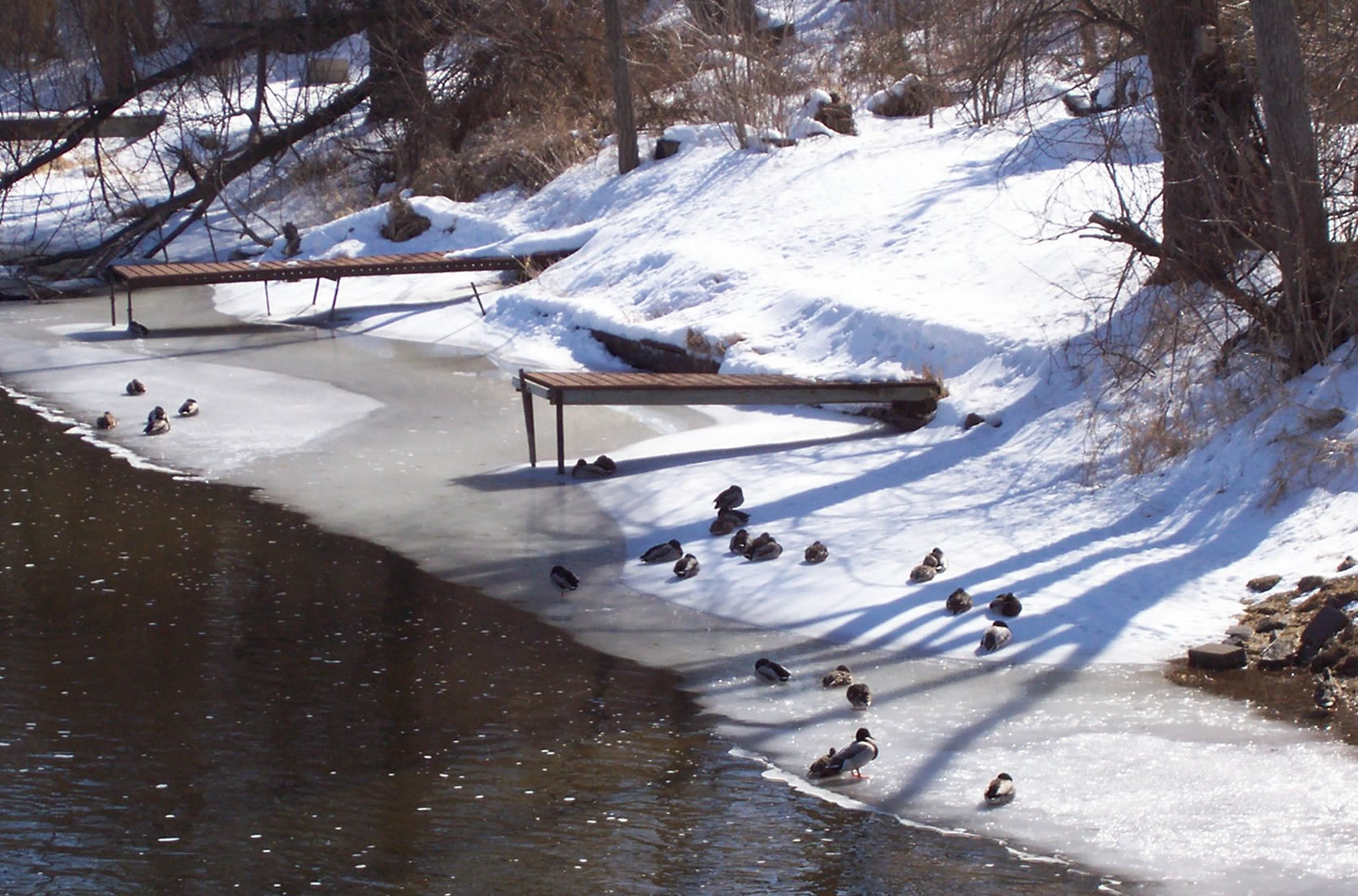
Mallard ducks in Montello, Wisconsin

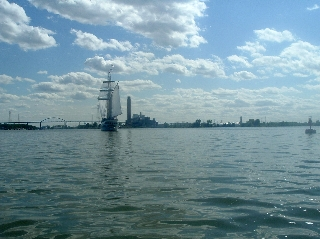
The tall ship, Windy II sails from Green Bay south into the mouth of the Fox River under the Leo Frigo Memorial Bridge in Green Bay, Wisconsin.

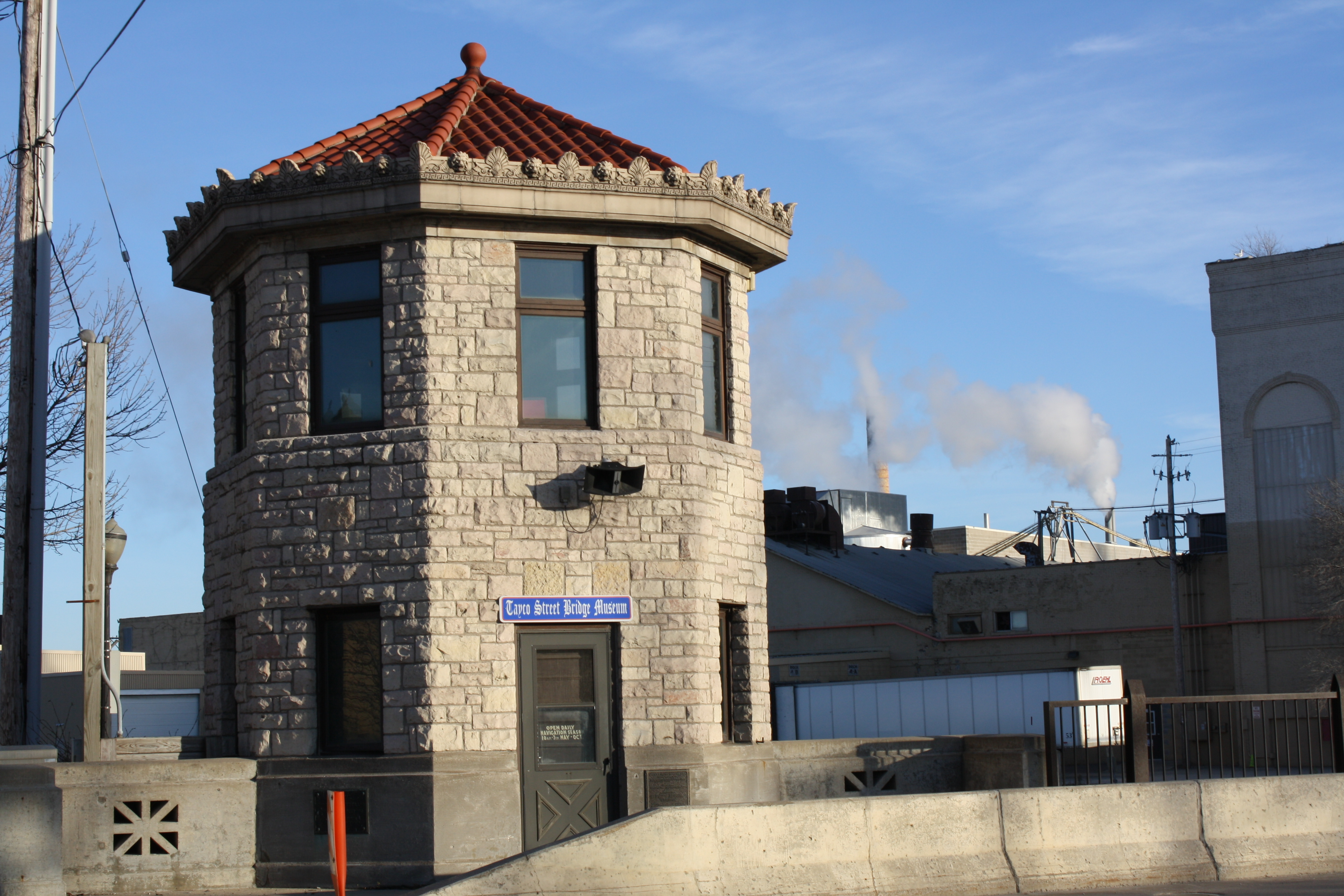
The museum for the Tayco Street Bridge in Menasha, Wisconsin on the Fox River. It is listed on the National Register of Historic Places

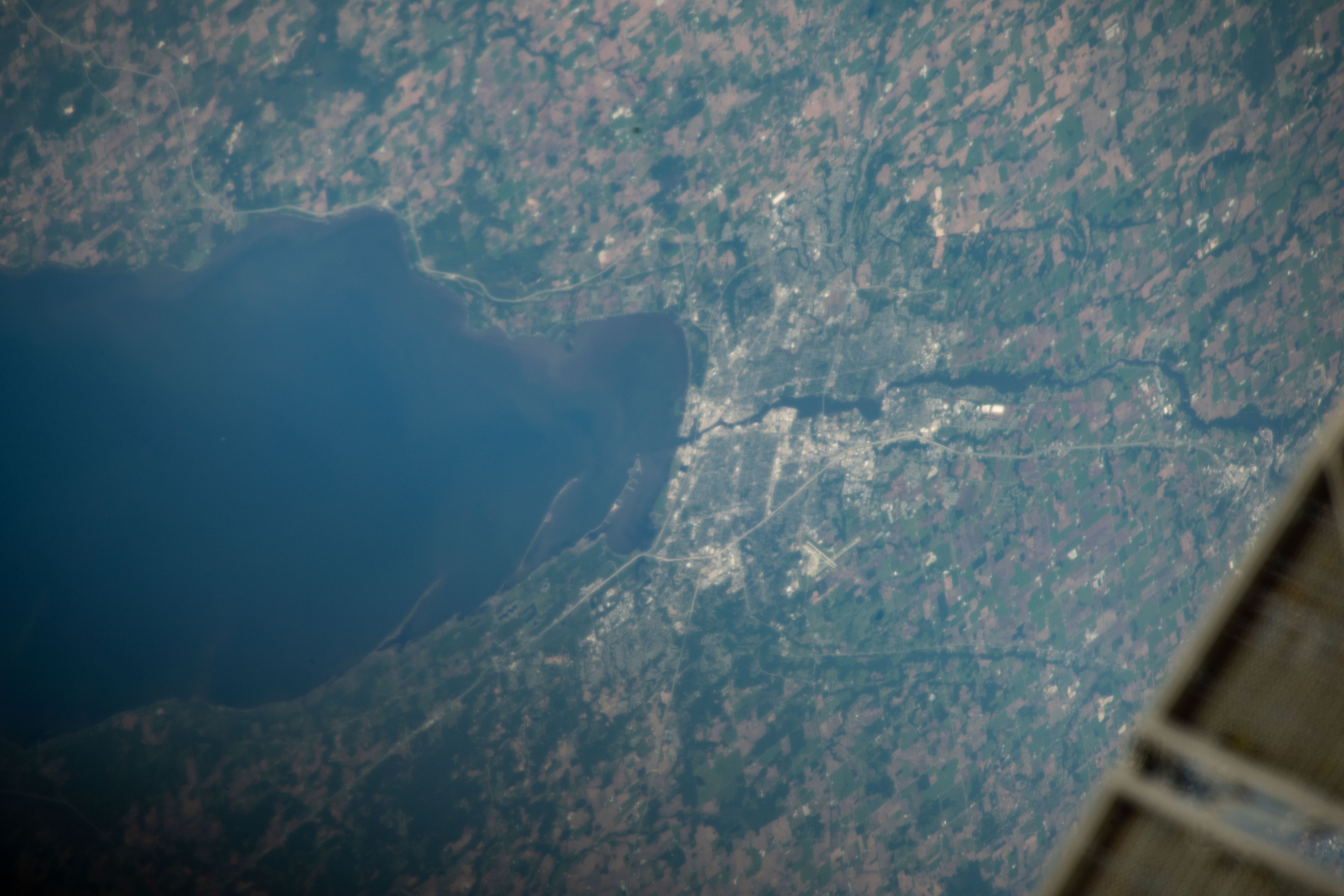
Taken from the International Space Station on June 17, 2022; north is oriented to the left

== See also ==
- Environmental issues with paper
- List of Wisconsin rivers
- Kaukauna Locks Historic District
- Fox River (Illinois River tributary) – Similarly named river in Southeastern Wisconsin and Northeastern Illinois
