= William and Susanna Geenen House =

Historic house in Wisconsin, United States

- U.S. National Register of Historic Places
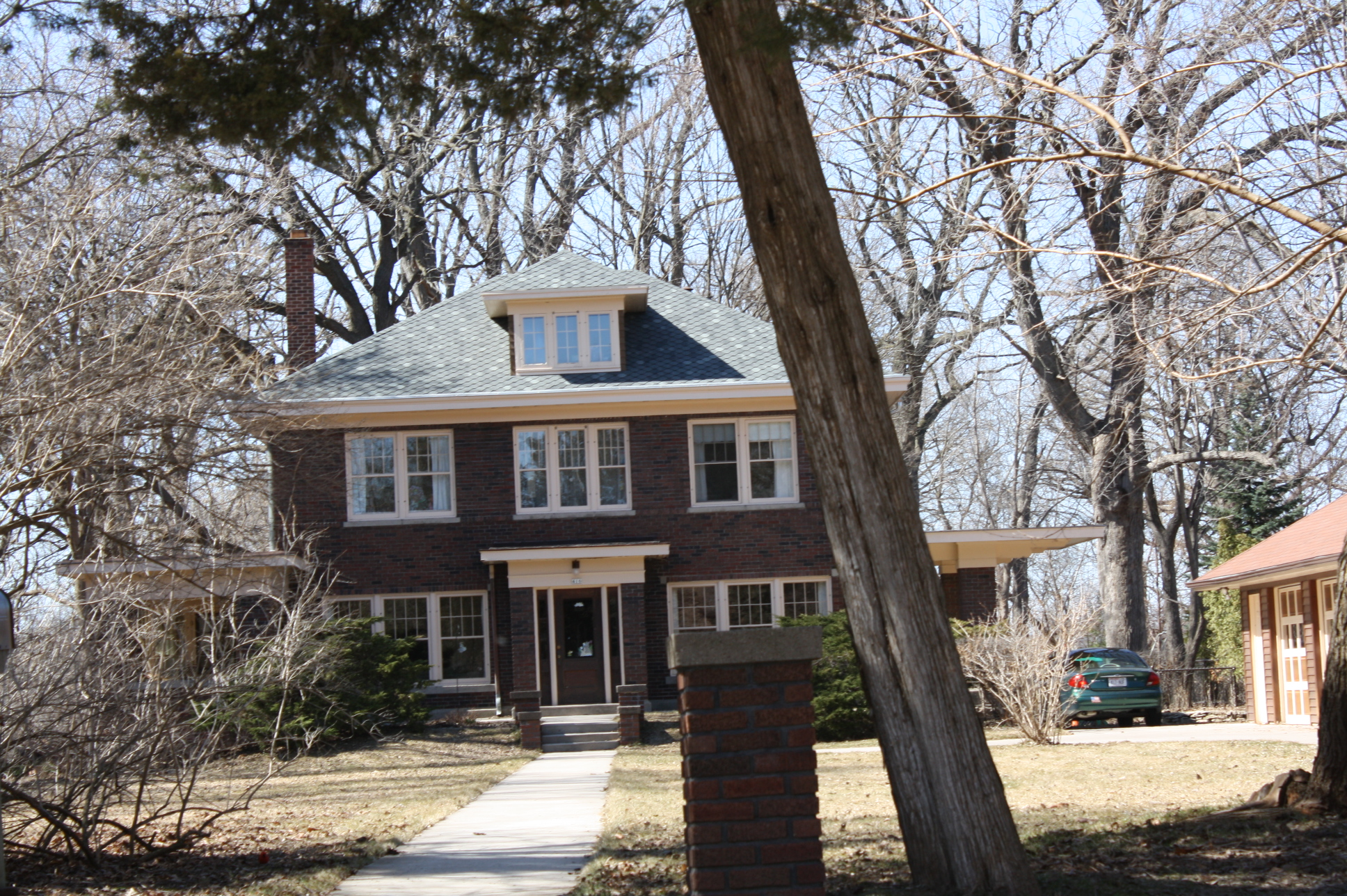

- Location within Wisconsin Location within the United States
- Location: 416 N. Sidney St., Kimberly, Wisconsin
- Coordinates: 44°16′36″N 88°20′11″W
- Area: less than one acre
- Built: 1921
- Architect: Henry Wildhagen
- Architectural style: American Movement/Vernacular/American Foursquare
- NRHP reference No.: 93000070
- Added to NRHP: February 25, 1993

The William and Susanna Geenen House is located in Kimberly, Wisconsin. Noted architect Henry Wildhagen was the designer. The house was added to the National Register of Historic Places in 1993 for its architectural significance.

It is an American foursquare house designed by German-born architect Henry Wildhagen.
