= Beaser School =

- U.S. National Register of Historic Places
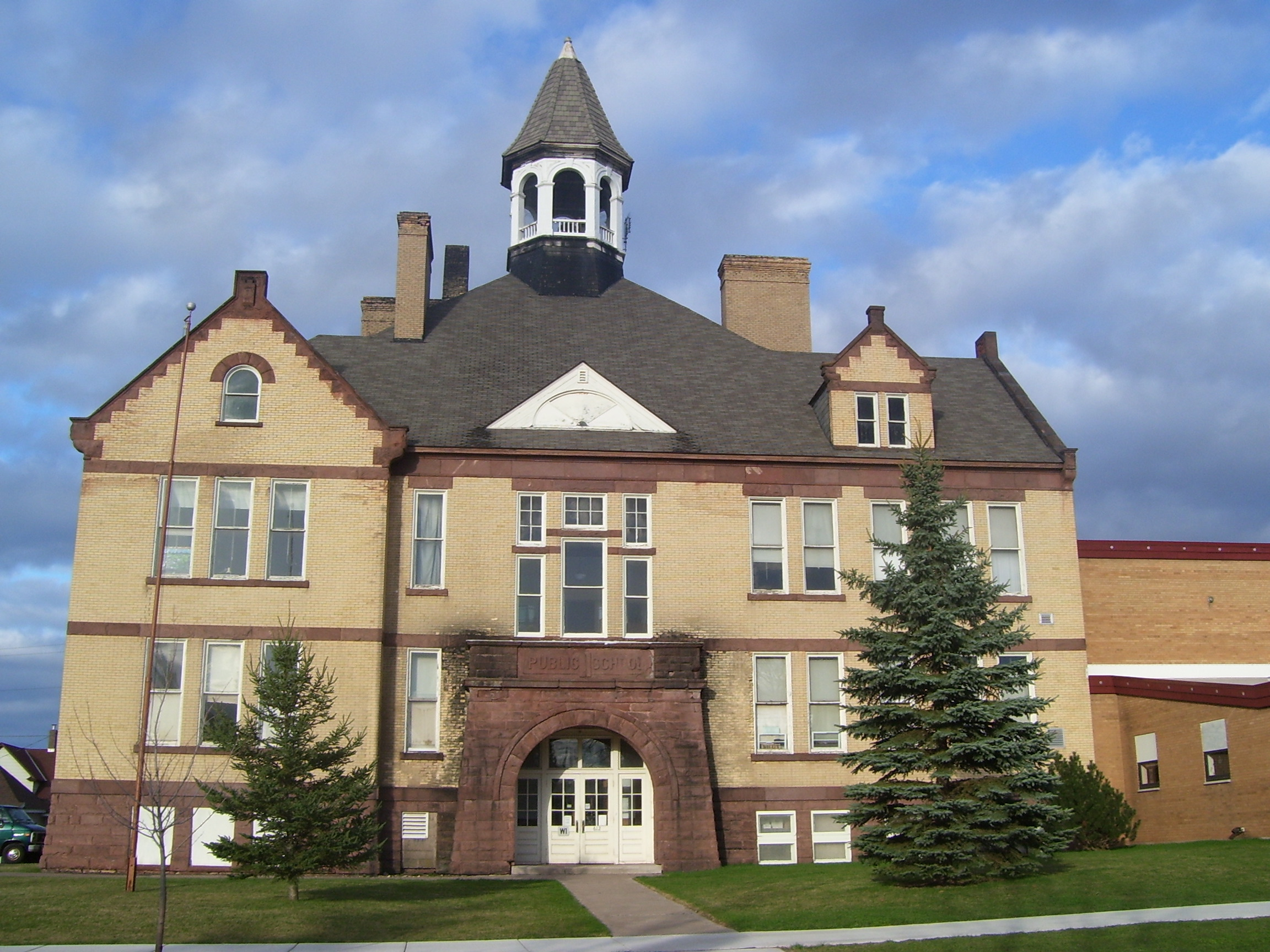

- Location within Wisconsin Location within the United States
- Location: 612 Beaser Ave; Ashland, Wisconsin
- Coordinates: 46°34′52″N 90°53′37″W
- Area: less than one acre
- Built: 1895, 1955
- Architect: Wildhagen, Henry
- MPS: Henry Wildhagen Schools of Ashland TR
- NRHP reference No.: 80000102
- Added to NRHP: July 17, 1980

Beaser School is a former school in Ashland, Wisconsin, United States. Built in 1895, it is a brick and brownstone building designed by architect Henry Wildhagen. It has a brownstone arch over a recessed entryway. It was expanded in 1955.

The building was added to the National Register of Historic Places in 1980, along with three other schools in Ashland also designed by Wildhagen: Ashland Middle School (1904), Ellis School (1900), and Wilmarth School (1895). (Note: The thematic resources document notes the four schools were built in 1895, 1899, 1900, and 1904, according to school records, without distinguishing which (page 5). However, Beaser School was 1899-built (page 4). Ashland Middle School was the "finally produced" one (page 5), hence must be 1904-built. Ellis is "closest in age" to the middle school (page 4), so it must be the 1900 one. Wilmarth is noted to have been built in 1895 (page 3).)

In 1991, Beaser School became the headquarters of Cooperative Educational Service Agency #12.
