= Washburn Public Library =

- U.S. National Register of Historic Places
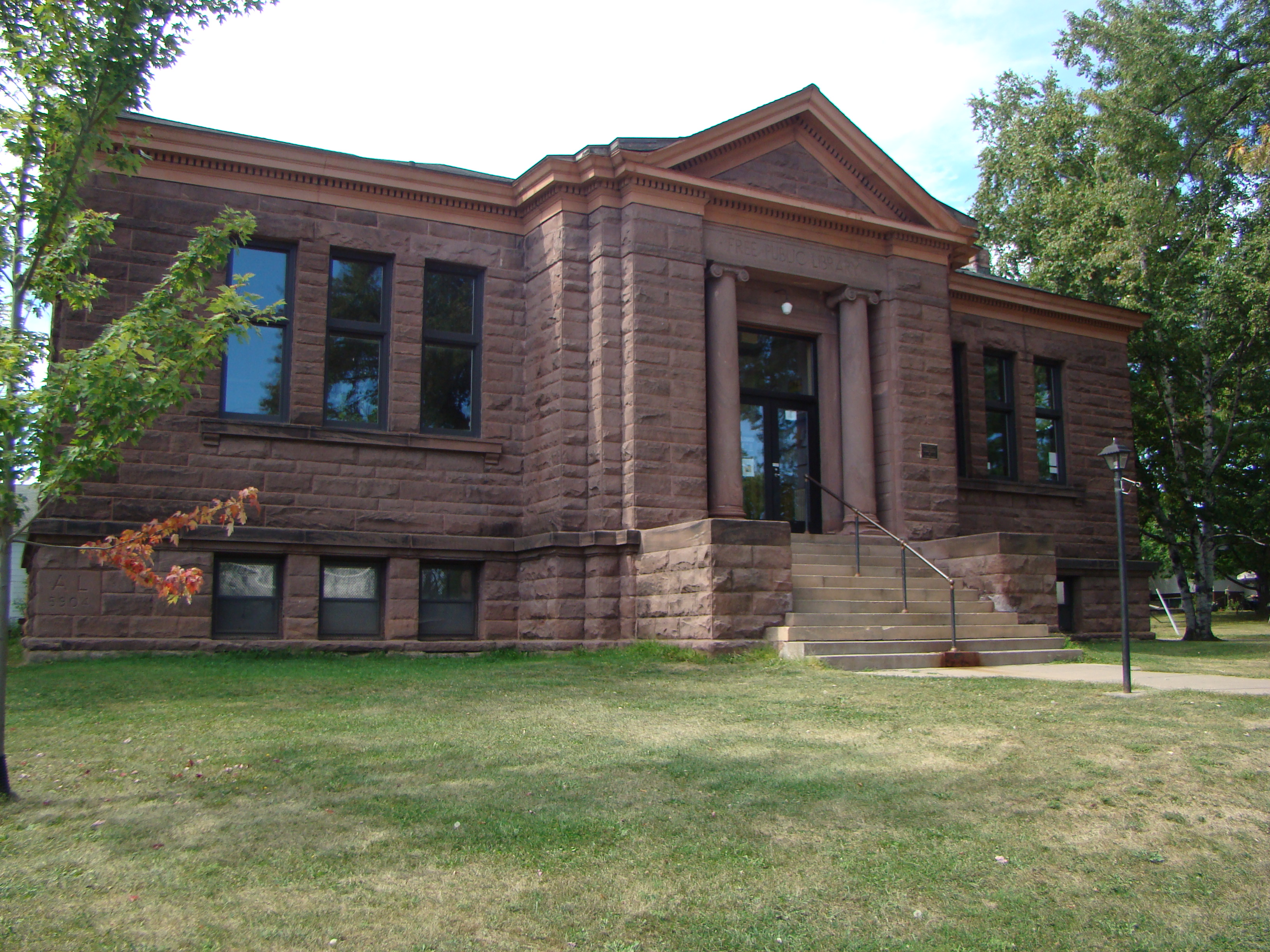

- Location within Wisconsin Location within the United States
- Location: Washington Ave. and W. 3rd St., Washburn, Wisconsin
- Coordinates: 46°40′22″N 90°53′43″W
- Area: less than one acre
- Built: 1904
- Architect: Henry Wildhagen
- Architectural style: Classical Revival
- NRHP reference No.: 84003621
- Added to NRHP: March 1, 1984

The Washburn Public Library is a Carnegie library in Washburn, Wisconsin, United States. The library was built in 1904; it was the first permanent home for Washburn's library program, which began in 1891 and had previously operated out of City Hall. Architect Henry Wildhagen designed the building in the Neoclassical style. The library's front entrance is located in a portico with Ionic columns. Three windows with a joined sill are located on each side of the entrance, and chimneys on either end add to the building's symmetrical appearance. The building was built with local brownstone. The library is still in operation.

The library was added to the National Register of Historic Places on March 1, 1984.
