= Montello River =

- Location within Wisconsin Location within the United States

Location
- Country: United States
- State: Wisconsin

Physical characteristics
- Source: Near Harrisville
  - coordinates: 43.877324°N 89.401393°W
  - elevation: 820 ft (250 m)
- Mouth: Fox River
  - coordinates: 43.7872012°N 89.3240081°W

Basin features
- Tributaries
  - left: Klawitter Creek

The Montello River is a river in central Wisconsin that is a tributary to the Fox River. It starts near Harrisville and flows through Montello. The river is dammed there, where it forms 341-acre (1.38 km^{2}) Lake Montello.
