= Renard Isle =

Man-made isand

Coordinates: 44.530917°N 87.980833°W

Renard Isle is a man-made island, or confined disposal facility (CDF) in the lower Green Bay, Wisconsin, just northeast of the mouth of the Fox River (Wisconsin). Formerly called Kidney Island, it is 55 acres constructed in 1977 by the U.S. Army Corps of Engineers as a disposal site for dredged materials taken from the Fox River and Green Bay harbor entrance channel. The dredged material is contaminated with Polychlorinated Biphenyls (PCBs) that are known probable carcinogens to humans, as well as large amounts of furans, dioxins, mercury, lead, pentachlorophenol, and hundreds of other persistent toxic chemicals which cause serious health concerns for fish, wildlife, and humans. Many of the chemicals, such as mercury and lead, will never break down. Renard Isle hit its designed capacity to hold contaminated materials around 1993.

== History ==
The lower Fox River in Green Bay, WI, became a popular site for paper mills in the late 19th century, which slowly contributed to the bulk of pollution of the Fox River. During the mid-20th century, paper mills producing a PCB containing carbonless copy-paper began contaminating the waters. It is estimated that "between 1957 and 1971, 250,000 pounds of PCBs were released, contaminating 11 million tons of sediment" in and around the Fox River. Since the channel in the lower Fox River and Green Bay harbor entrance needed to be maintained to provide a suitable depth for ship traffic, dredging is done to remove sediment at the bottom. Since that sediment is contaminated with PCBs that do not naturally biodegrade, Renard Isle was constructed to house those dredge spoils. The man-made structure holds approximately 2.7 million cubic yards of contaminated dredgings.

Since 2010, the U.S. Army Corps has spent upwards of $4 million to cap the island and restore it to be suitable for recreational use. The island and its contaminated makeup is currently capped off with clay and covered with clean topsoil.

== Current Use ==
In 2010, the federal government opened up the project to construct an 850-foot causeway to Renard Isle for bids, and controversy arose when two local companies were denied with their bids of $684,000 and $763,000 to award the job to a Milwaukee firm located within a HUB zone for $2,400,000 instead. Coincidentally, the federal government budgeted $2,500,000 for the project.

Currently, the causeway to connect Renard Isle to the mainland for recreational use has not yet commenced due to a governmental dispute between Brown County and the city of Green Bay over an existing 16-foot-wide road, which would become a permanent easement to access the causeway. Brown County is pushing for its conversion into a permanent easement, while the city of Green Bay does not want to give up the land due to its location adjacent to Bay Beach Amusement Park.
