= Kimberly, Wisconsin =

- Village
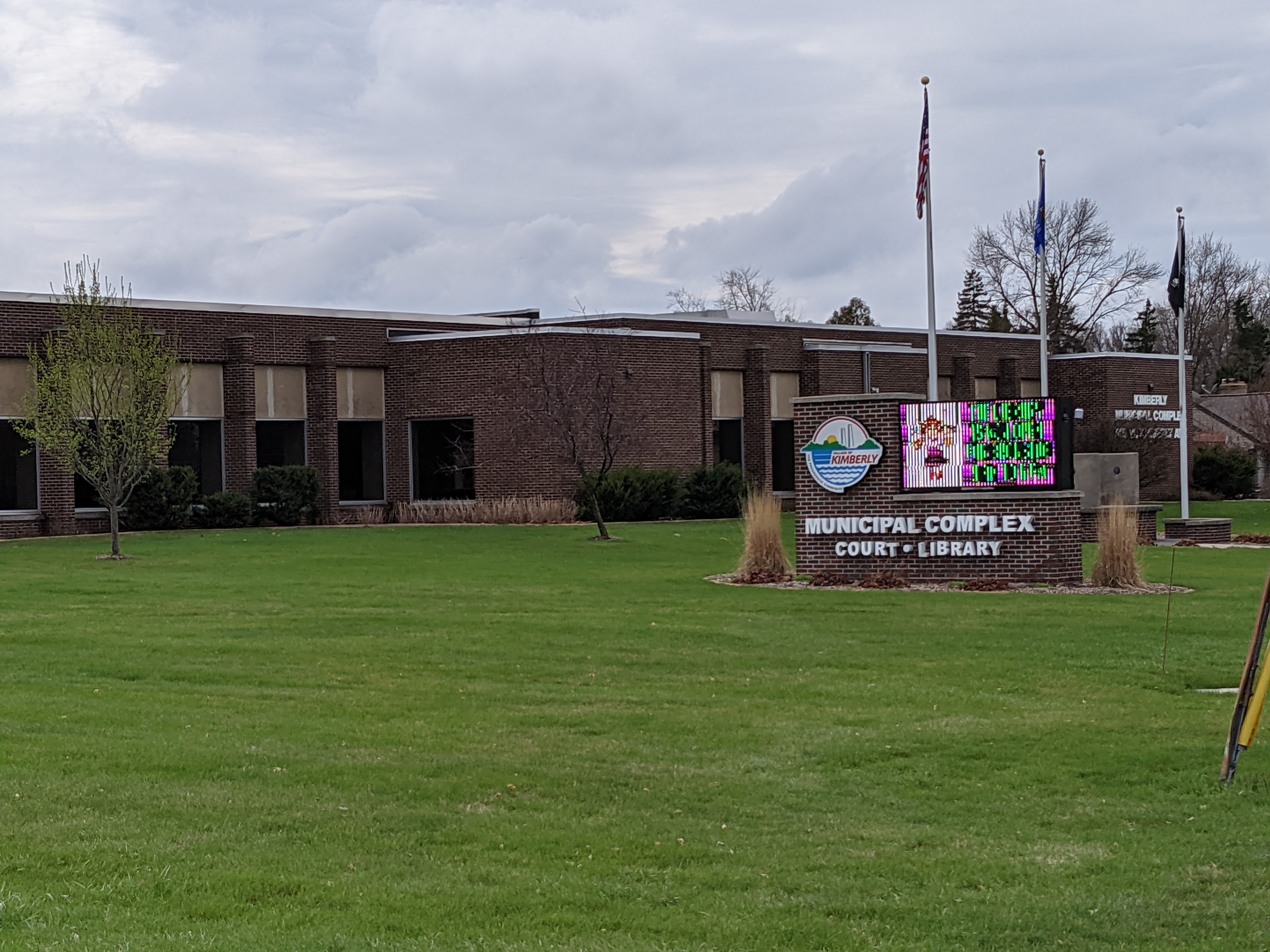
- Kimberly, Wisconsin Municipal Complex

- Location of Kimberly in Outagamie County, Wisconsin.
- Coordinates: 44°16′N 88°20′W
- Country: United States
- State: Wisconsin
- County: Outagamie

Area
  - Total: 2.41 sq mi (6.25 km^{2})
  - Land: 2.30 sq mi (5.95 km^{2})
  - Water: 0.12 sq mi (0.30 km^{2})
- Elevation: 732 ft (223 m)

Population (2020)
  - Total: 7,320
  - Density: 3,186/sq mi (1,230.3/km^{2})
- Time zone: UTC-6 (Central (CST))
  - Summer (DST): UTC-5 (CDT)
- Area code: 920
- FIPS code: 55-39650
- GNIS feature ID: 1567486
- Website: https://www.vokimberlywi.gov/

Kimberly is a village in Outagamie County, Wisconsin, United States. The population was 7,320 at the 2020 census. The village is east of Appleton. It is a part of the Appleton, Wisconsin Metropolitan Statistical Area.

== History ==
Kimberly was originally known as The Cedars (after the Treaty of the Cedars) and later as Smithfield. In 1889 it was renamed after John A. Kimberly (1838–1928), one of the co-founders of what is now the Kimberly-Clark Corporation, when the company opened a paper mill in the community.

== Geography ==
Kimberly is located at 44°16′N 88°20′W (44.2684, –88.3375).

According to the United States Census Bureau, the village has a total area of 2.42 square miles (6.27 km^{2}), of which 2.26 square miles (5.85 km^{2}) is land and 0.16 square miles (0.41 km^{2}) is water.

== Demographics ==
Historical population
Census	Pop.	Note	%±
1910	600		—
1920	1,382		130.3%
1930	2,256		63.2%
1940	2,618		16.0%
1950	3,179		21.4%
1960	5,322		67.4%
1970	6,131		15.2%
1980	5,881		−4.1%
1990	5,406		−8.1%
2000	6,146		13.7%
2010	6,468		5.2%
2020	7,320		13.2%
U.S. Decennial Census

=== 2010 census ===
At the 2010 census there were 6,468 people, 2,739 households, and 1,760 families living in the village. The population density was 2,861.9 inhabitants per square mile (1,105.0/km^{2}). There were 2,871 housing units at an average density of 1,270.4 per square mile (490.5/km^{2}). The racial makeup of the village was 94.0% White, 0.8% African American, 0.9% Native American, 2.1% Asian, 0.8% from other races, and 1.4% from two or more races. Hispanic or Latino of any race were 2.3%.

Of the 2,739 households 31.4% had children under the age of 18 living with them, 49.8% were married couples living together, 8.9% had a female householder with no husband present, 5.5% had a male householder with no wife present, and 35.7% were non-families. 30.3% of households were one person and 13.3% were one person aged 65 or older. The average household size was 2.35 and the average family size was 2.92.

The median age in the village was 38.1 years. 24.4% of residents were under the age of 18; 7% were between the ages of 18 and 24; 27.6% were from 25 to 44; 24.4% were from 45 to 64; and 16.4% were 65 or older. The gender makeup of the village was 48.6% male and 51.4% female.

=== 2000 census ===
At the 2000 census there were 6,146 people, 2,507 households, and 1,677 families living in the village. The population density was 3,265.9 per square mile (1,261.0/km^{2}). There were 2,593 housing units at an average density of 1,377.9 per square mile (532.0/km^{2}). The racial makeup of the village was 97.54% White, 0.26% African American, 0.72% Native American, 0.83% Asian, 0.16% from other races, and 0.49% from two or more races. Hispanic or Latino of any race were 0.75%.

Of the 2,507 households 32.2% had children under the age of 18 living with them, 56.2% were married couples living together, 7.8% had a female householder with no husband present, and 33.1% were non-families. 28.2% of households were one person and 11.8% were one person aged 65 or older. The average household size was 2.45 and the average family size was 3.04.

The age distribution was 25.8% under the age of 18, 7.5% from 18 to 24, 33.0% from 25 to 44, 18.7% from 45 to 64, and 15.0% 65 or older. The median age was 35 years. For every 100 females, there were 96.5 males. For every 100 females age 18 and over, there were 93.4 males.

The median household income was $46,370 and the median family income was $54,692. Males had a median income of $40,213 versus $26,581 for females. The per capita income for the village was $20,933. About 1.5% of families and 3.1% of the population were below the poverty line, including 2.7% of those under age 18 and 6.6% of those age 65 or over.

== Landmarks and businesses ==
The Kimberly Mill was located on the Fox River. It was built in 1889 by the Kimberly-Clark Corporation to make newsprint. Beginning in the 1920s, it started making coated paper. In 1976 it was sold to Repap. It was in turn sold to Consolidated Papers (1997), Stora Enso (2000), and NewPage (2007). On July 30, 2008, NewPage announced its plans to close the plant in August 2008, and sever employment by September 30, 2008.

The Kimberly Mill continued to produce fine paper, magazine paper and specialty paper, until the shut down date. In 2011 NewPage sold the property to AIM (American Iron & Metal) Demolition USA. After efforts to reopen the mill were unsuccessful, equipment was auctioned off, and the demolition of the mill commenced. In 2013, AIM unveiled a plan to develop the area as The Cedars, an homage to Kimberly's former name of The Cedars. In 2017 the Village acquired the land from AIM and is continuing the project.

The William and Susanna Geenen House was designed by Henry Wildhagen and constructed in 1921. In 1993, it was added to the National Register of Historic Places.

== Education ==
Kimberly is served by the Kimberly Area School District, which also draws students from Kimberly, Combined Locks, and parts of Buchanan and Harrison (Darboy).

== Transportation ==
The Tri-County Expressway (Wisconsin Highway 441) runs on the west side of the town and forms the border between Kimberly and Appleton. Bus service is operated by Valley Transit. Appleton International Airport provides air service for Kimberly.

== Notable people ==
- A. J. Klein, NFL player
- Chris Van Cuyk, professional baseball player
- Logan Bruss, NFL player

== Images ==
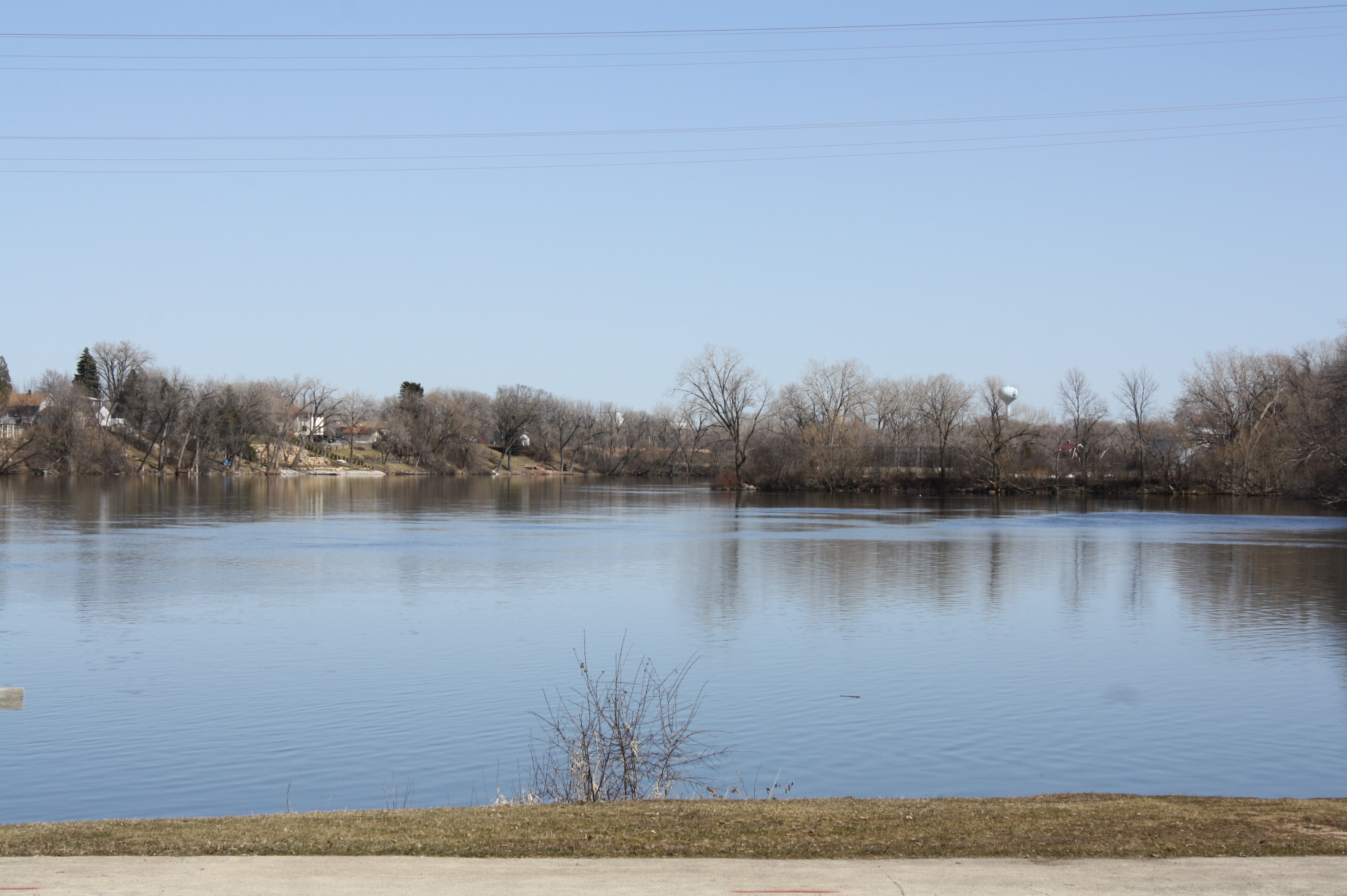
Fox River from Sunset Park

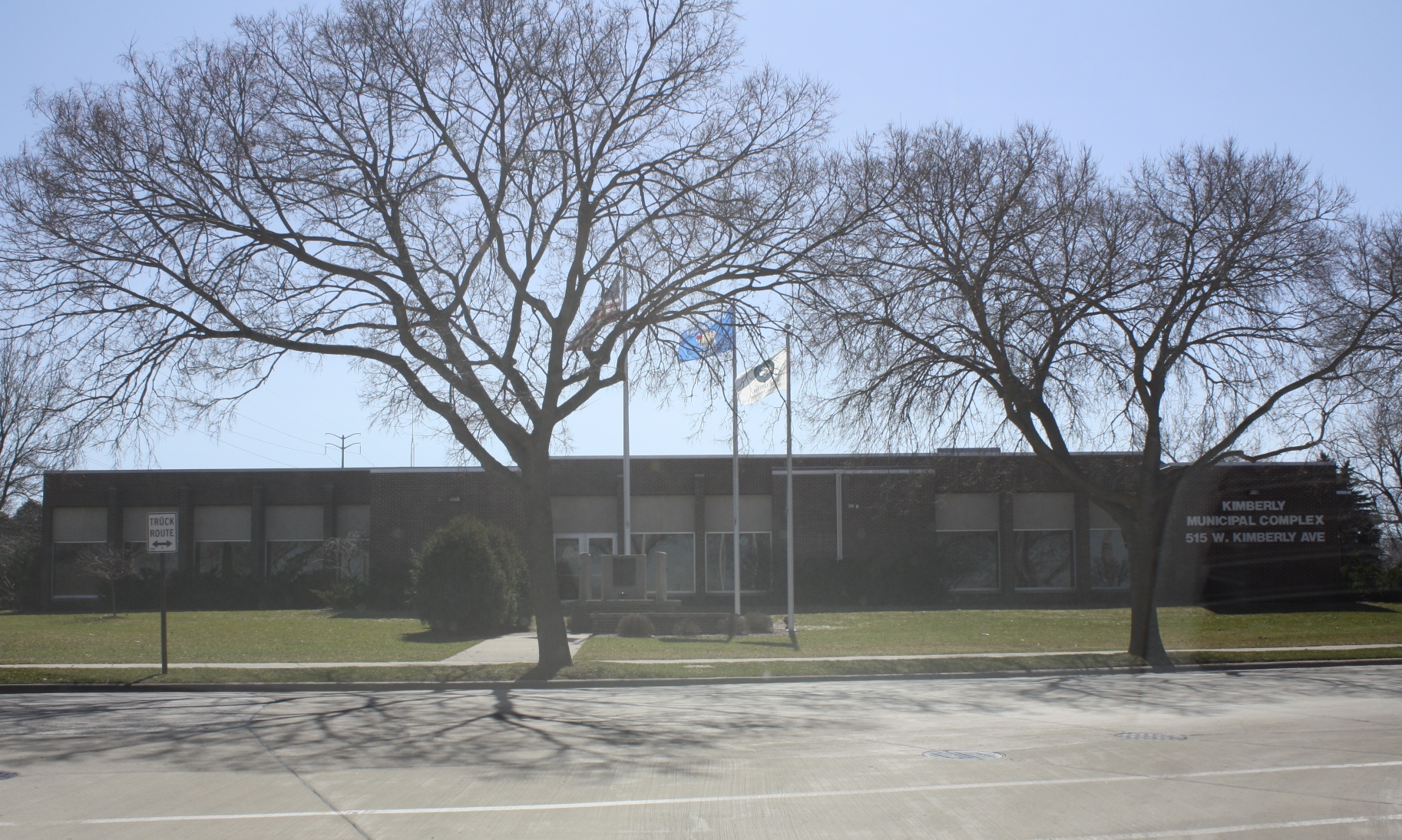
Village hall
