= Mellen City Hall =

- U.S. National Register of Historic Places
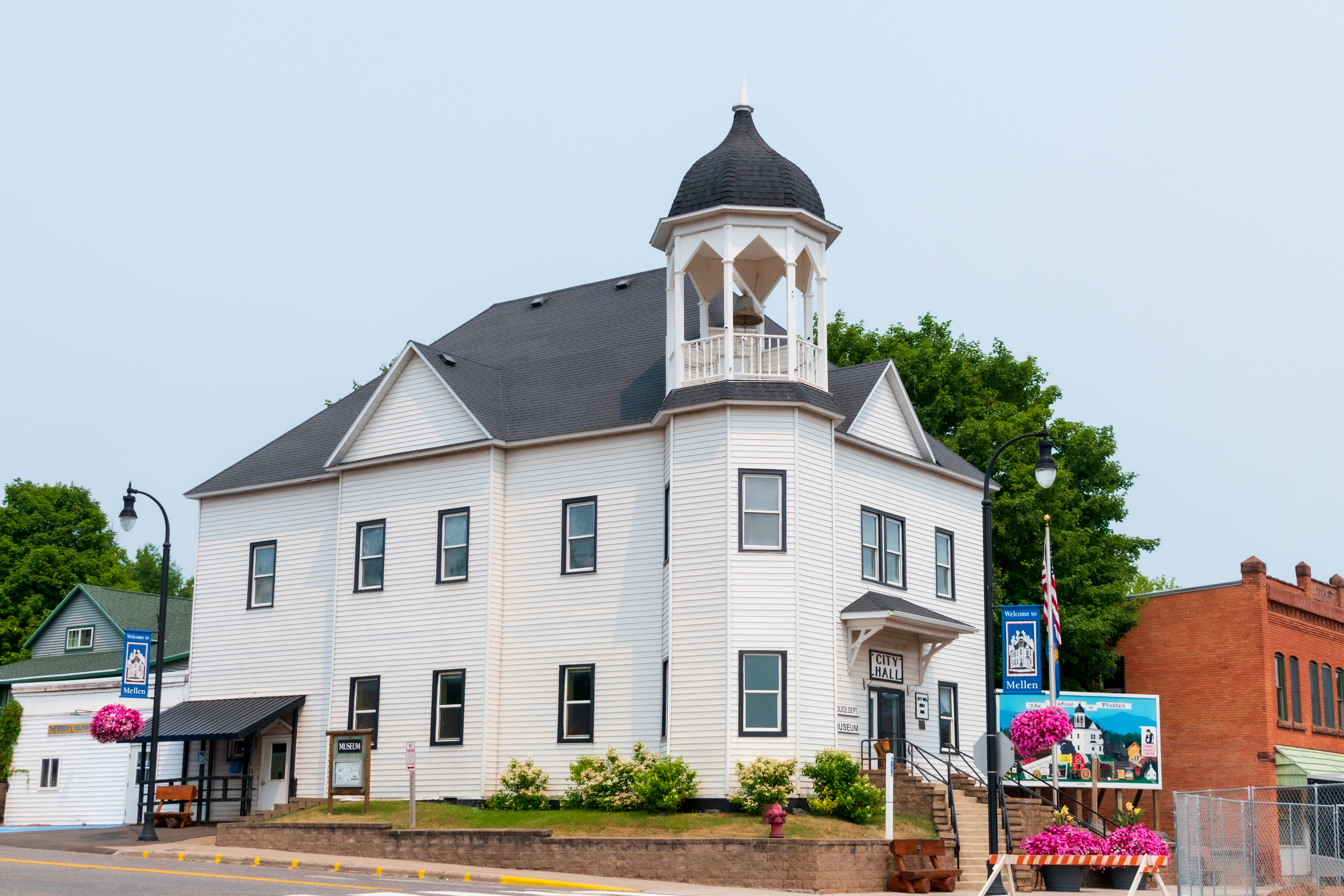

- Location within Wisconsin Location within the United States
- Location: 102 E. Bennet Ave. Mellen, Wisconsin
- Coordinates: 46°19′37″N 90°39′37″W
- Architectural style: Victorian, Queen Anne
- NRHP reference No.: 79000341
- Added to NRHP: September 20, 1979

Mellen City Hall is a city hall in Mellen, Wisconsin, United States, which was added to the National Register of Historic Places in 1979. A restored Victorian structure, it still serves as the home of the city government, as well as the Mellen Historical Society and the Mellen Museum.

== Description ==
Mellen City Hall is a two-story building with a Queen Anne design made by architect Henry Wildhagen of Ashland. The southwest corner of the building has a projecting octagonal belfry with a bell roof; the bell is rung annually on Independence Day. The building's main entrance is on the south side and is topped by a bracketed overhang, which was a balcony prior to a 1921 renovation. The north end of the building has a two-door garage installed for the city fire department. The building's hip roof is broken by windowless dormers on the south and west sides.

== History ==
Mellen City Hall was built in 1896 as the city's first government building. It has housed local government offices and city police since its opening, and it originally held the local jail as well. The city fire department moved into the building in 1907, the same year Mellen was incorporated. Local organizations, such as the Commercial Club and American Legion, have also used the building as a meeting space; the latter also hosted weekly dances there. During the 1910-11 school year, Mellen taught grades 6 and up in City Hall after its school burned down. The city's first library opened in the building in 1927, and its local history museum began there in 1976.

Mellen City Hall appeared in the 1962 film Hemingway's Adventures of a Young Man, which was partly filmed in Mellen.
