= Ashland Middle School (Ashland, Wisconsin) =

- Formerly listed on the U.S. National Register of Historic Places
- Location: 1000 Ellis Ave; Ashland, Wisconsin
- Coordinates: 46.584665°N 90.874909°W
- MPS: Henry Wildhagen Schools of Ashland TR
- NRHP reference No.: 80000101

Significant dates
- Added to NRHP: July 17, 1980
- Removed from NRHP: May 12, 2009

Ashland Middle School is a middle school in Ashland, Wisconsin's Ashland School District. It is also the name of a former school building that was listed on the U.S. National Register of Historic Places from 1980 until it was delisted in 2009.

The former school building was built in 1904 and was noted for its architecture, which contained Late Victorian, nineteenth-century revival and twentieth-century revival styles. The building was designed by Henry Wildhagen, who also designed three other schools in Ashland, all surviving, which also are NRHP-listed: Beaser School (1899), Ellis School (1900), and Wilmarth School (1895). (Note: The thematic resources document notes the four schools were built in 1895, 1899, 1900, and 1904, according to school records, without distinguishing which (page 5). However, Beaser School was 1899-built (page 4). Ashland Middle School was the "finally produced" one (page 5), hence must be 1904-built. Ellis is "closest in age" to the middle school (page 4), so it must be the 1900 one. Wilmarth is noted to have been built in 1895 (page 3).)

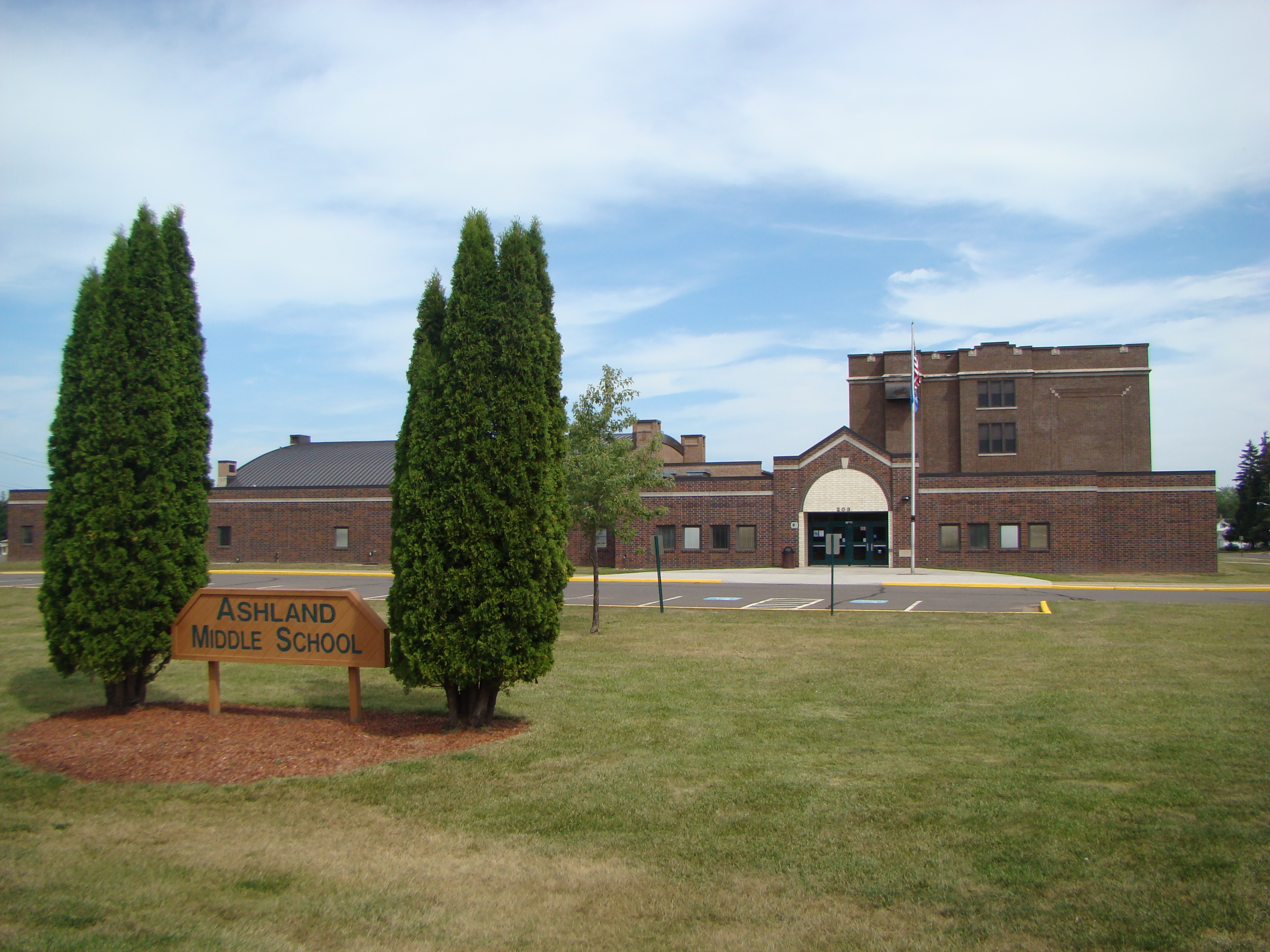
Current school

The current school building also hosts the Oredocker Project School, a charter school with a focus on students learning through completing comprehensive projects.
