= Fox Cities =

- Combined Statistical Area
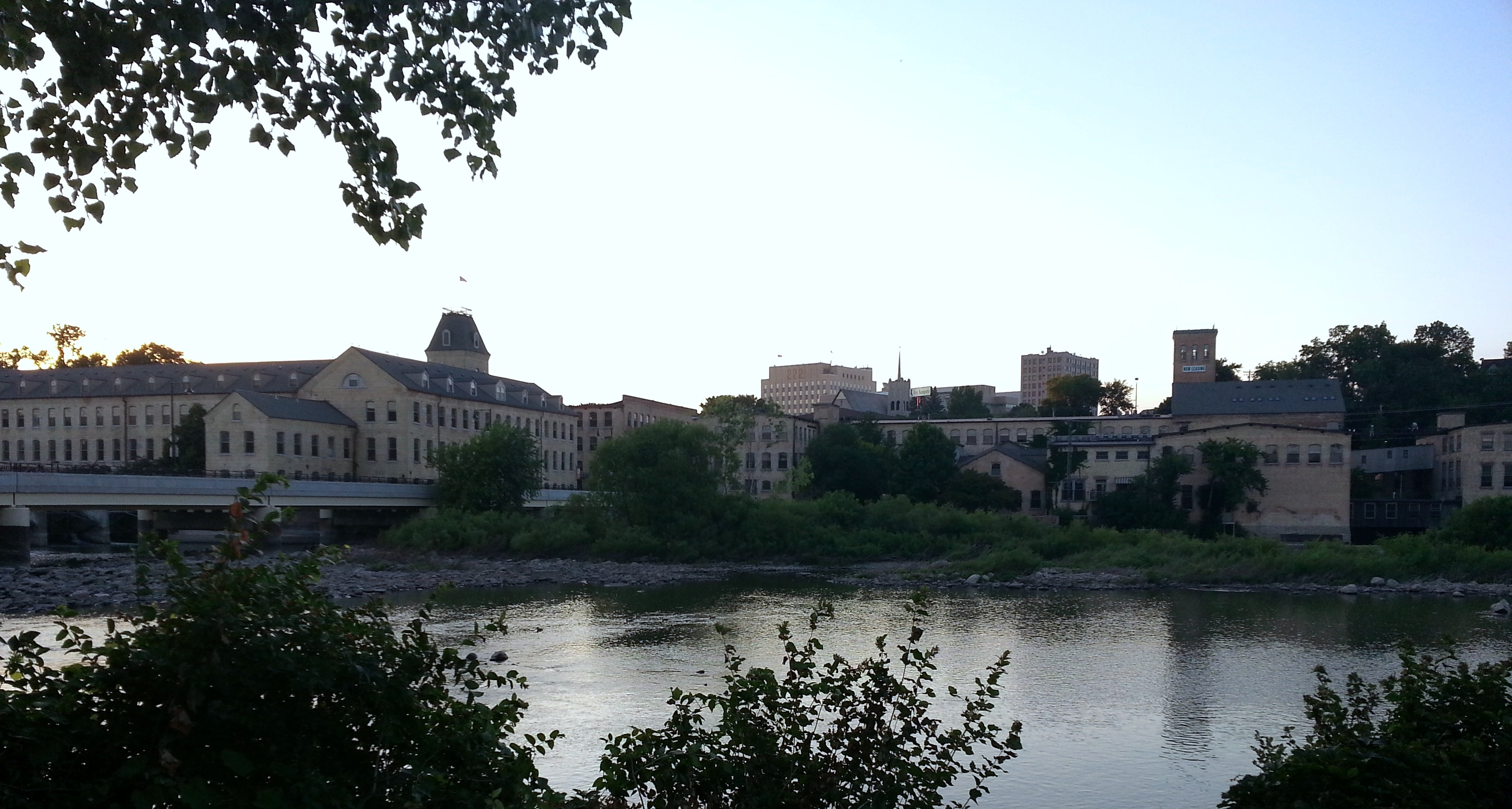
- Downtown Appleton
Map of Appleton–Oshkosh–Neenah, WI CSA
City of Appleton
Appleton, WI MSA
City of Oshkosh
City of Neenah
Oshkosh–Neenah, WI MSA
- Country: United States
- State: Wisconsin
- Largest city: Appleton
- Other cities: Oshkosh; Neenah; Menasha; Kaukauna
- Time zone: UTC−06:00 (CST)
  - Summer (DST): UTC−05:00 (CDT)

The Fox Cities are a group of communities located along the Fox River in east-central Wisconsin. The region centers around the city of Appleton and includes other core municipalities such as Neenah, Menasha, Kaukauna, Grand Chute, and Fox Crossing. These cities are situated in Outagamie, Winnebago, and Calumet counties and have historically developed due to their proximity to the river, which played a significant role in transportation and industrial growth, particularly in paper manufacturing.

Major points of interest include the Fox Cities Exhibition Center, Community First Champion Center, Fox Cities Performing Arts Center, High Cliff State Park, and Neuroscience Group Field at Fox Cities Stadium. The Fox River Mall is the largest shopping mall in the state at 1.2 million square feet. Area post-secondary schools include Fox Valley Technical College and Lawrence University. Television and radio stations in the area, usually originating out of Green Bay, identify as serving "Green Bay/Fox Cities" to acknowledge both major population centers in the region (for stations licensed to Green Bay, that community must be mentioned first).

Bus transit for the area is provided by Valley Transit and commercial airline service is provided by Appleton International Airport. Major highway routes in the area include: Interstate 41/U.S. Route 41, which connects the Fox Cities with Green Bay and Milwaukee; Wisconsin Highway 441, known locally as the Tri-County Expressway, which is an auxiliary highway of Interstate 41 that serves as a beltway around Appleton; and U.S. Route 10 which travels east–west, connecting the Fox Cities with Stevens Point, Waupaca and Manitowoc, along with Interstate 39 and Wausau.

== Definitions ==
The Fox Cities communities, as defined by its Chamber of Commerce and Convention and Visitors Bureau, include:

- The cities of Appleton (pop. 74,526), Kaukauna (16,246), Menasha (18,268), and Neenah (26,062)
- The villages of Combined Locks (pop. 3,588), Fox Crossing (19,029), Harrison (11,532), Hortonville (2,767), Kimberly (6,803), Little Chute (11,564), and Sherwood (2,985)
- The towns of Buchanan (pop. 6,755), Clayton (3,951), Freedom (5,842), Grand Chute (20,919), Greenville (10,309), Neenah (3,237), Vandenbroek (1,474)

=== Combined statistical area ===
The Fox Cities constitute a portion of the Appleton-Oshkosh-Neenah, WI Combined Statistical Area (CSA), which also includes the city of Oshkosh and rural portions of Calumet, Outagamie and Winnebago counties. As of the 2010 Census, the CSA had a population of 392,660 (2017 estimate: 406,540), making it the third largest CSA in Wisconsin, behind Milwaukee and Madison.

== At night ==
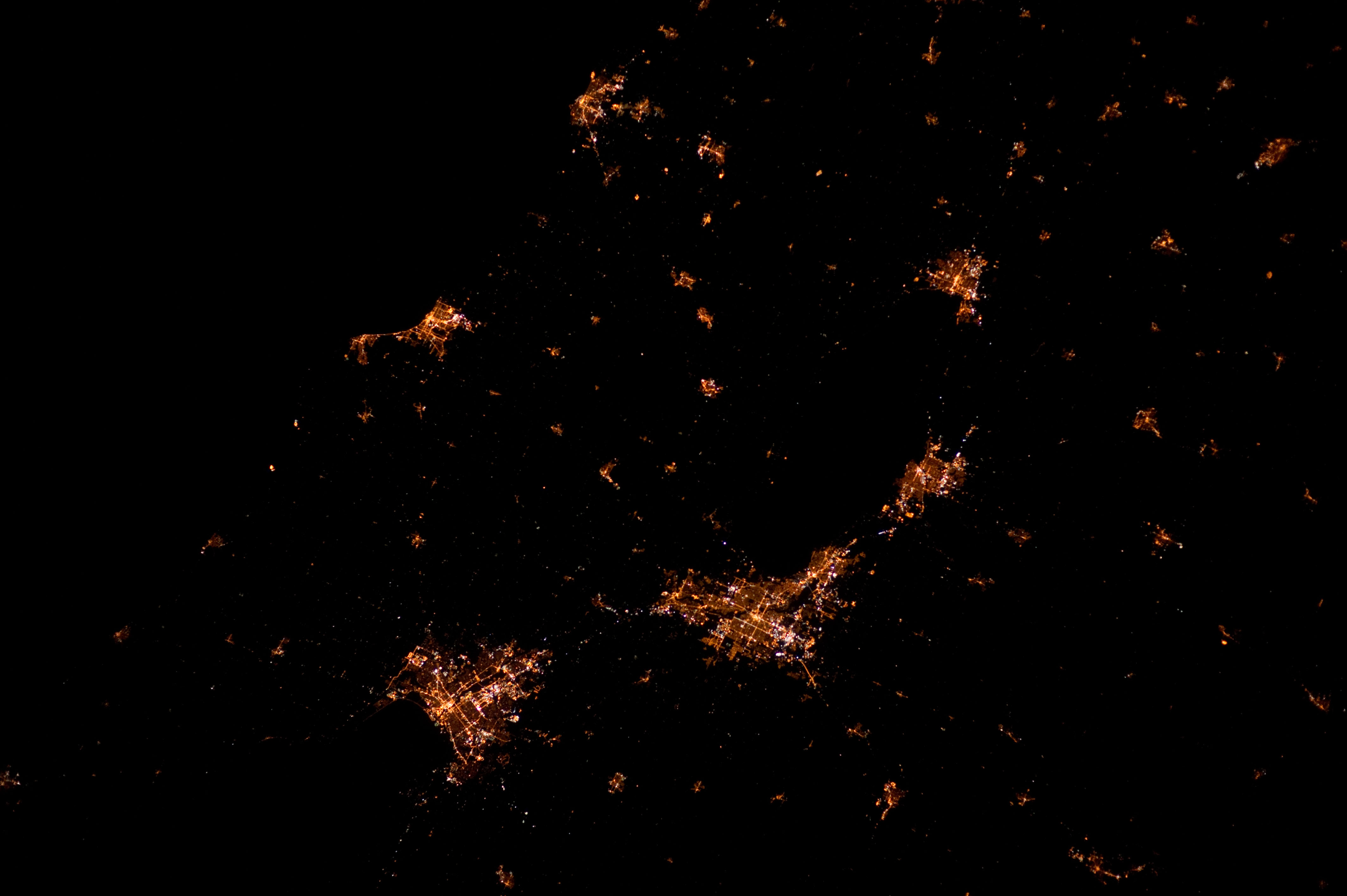
Taken at 3:09:47 A.M. CDT on March 28, 2012 from an altitude of 211 nautical miles (391 km) during ISS Expedition 30. Clockwise, from lower left: Green Bay, Manitowoc/Two Rivers, Sheboygan, Fond du Lac, Oshkosh, Appleton/Neenah/Menasha (Fox Valley).
