= Wisconsin Highway 15 =

State highway in Wisconsin, United States

State Trunk Highway 15
- WIS-15 highlighted in red

Route information
- Maintained by WisDOT
- Length: 14.8 mi (23.8 km)

Major junctions
- West end: US 45 southeast of New London
- WIS 76 in Greenville
- East end: I-41 / US 41 / CTH-OO northwest of Appleton

Location
- Country: United States
- State: Wisconsin
- Counties: Outagamie

Highway system
- Wisconsin State Trunk Highway System; Interstate; US; State; Scenic; Rustic
← WIS 14	→ WIS 16

State Trunk Highway 15 (STH-15, commonly known as Highway 15 or WIS 15) is a 14.8-mile (23.8 km) state highway in Outagamie County in the US state of Wisconsin that runs east–west and provides a shortcut to Appleton from U.S. Highway 45 (US 45) for travelers inbound from points north and west. Most of WIS 15 was once part of US 45, which was redirected south of New London to bypass Appleton and provide direct access to Oshkosh and points south.

== Route description ==
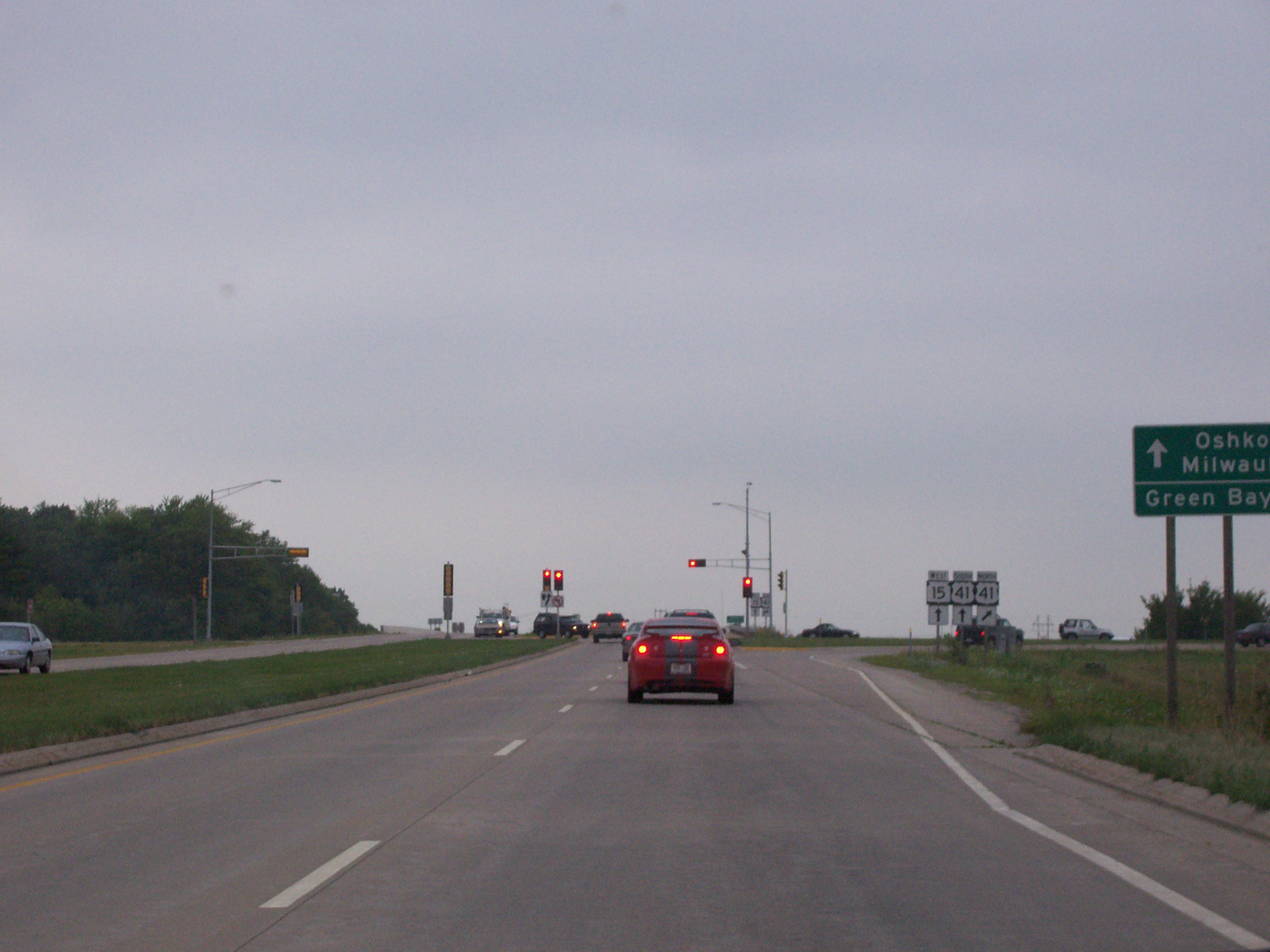
Looking west along WIS 15 (and CTH-T) from its eastern terminus, immediately northwest of Appleton, August 2006

WIS 15 begins at the junction of US 45 and County Trunk Highway T (CTH-T) in the Town of Hortonia (just southeast of New London) as a four-lane divided expressway and heads southeast to Hortonville where the route runs around the northern edge of the village. Access to the center of Hortenville is provided with roundabouts at either end of the village. The route then continues southeast into Greenville. The highway intersects WIS 76 in Greenville then continues southeast for one mile (1.6 km) before turning east at the junction with CTH-CB. WIS 15 then junctions with Interstate 41 (I-41) where it ends and Northland Avenue and CTH-OO begin in the Town of Grand Chute, just northwest of Appleton. WIS 15 provides access to Neuroscience Group Field at Fox Cities Stadium.

== History ==
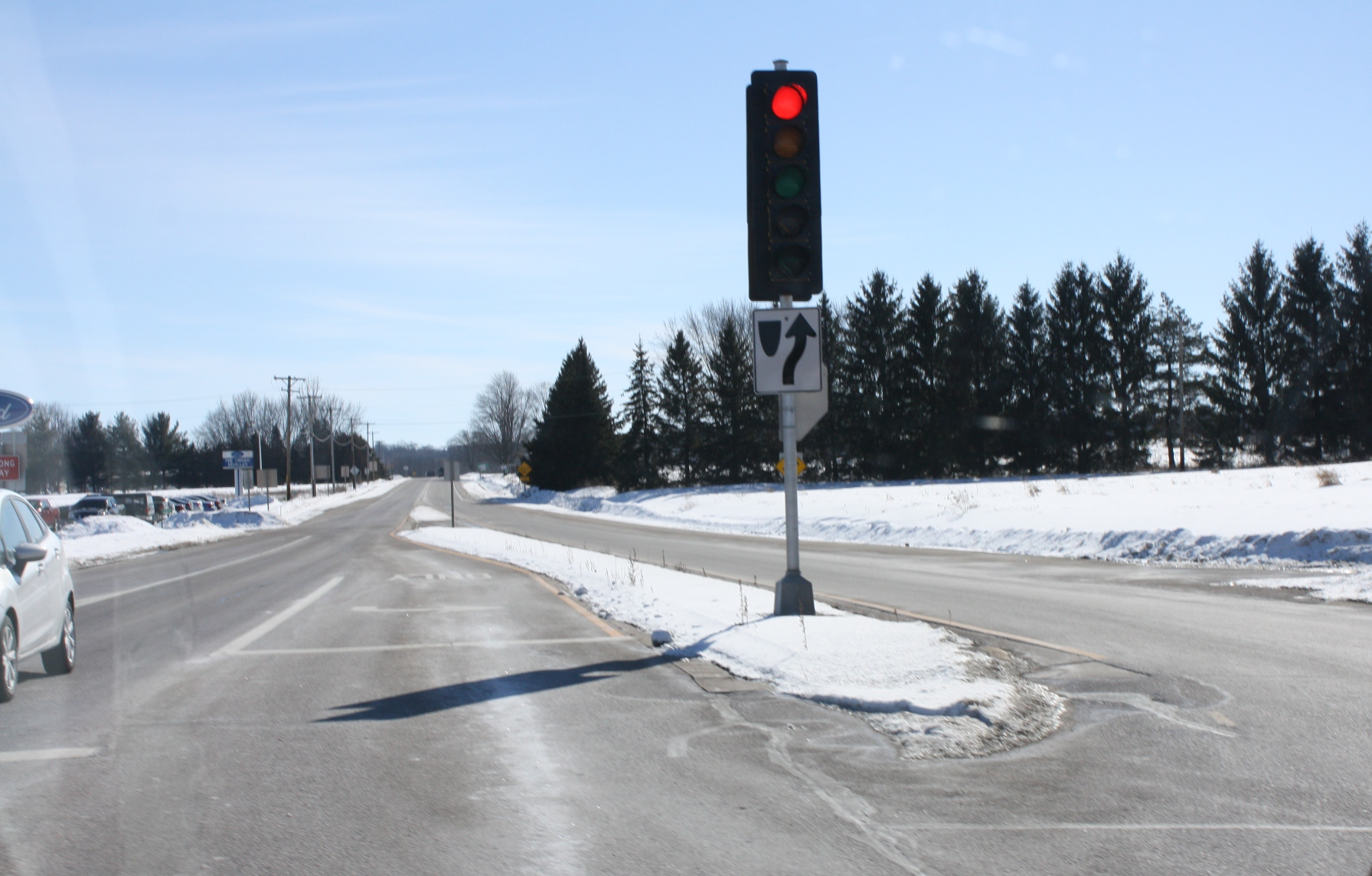
Looking southeasterly along WIS 15 from its eastern terminus, immediately northwest of Appleton, February 2013

This is the third iteration of the route number. The first iteration followed present day US 41 from the Illinois border to Marinette via Milwaukee, Fond du Lac, Appleton and Green Bay. The second is the more well-known alignment following the present day I-43 from the Hale Interchange in Milwaukee to I-90 in Beloit as the Rock Freeway. From the Hale Interchange, this iteration followed I-894 northward then turned east onto National Avenue and ended in downtown Milwaukee.

Previously, the current WIS 15 route was US 45, which turned south at its intersection with WIS 76. The later highway continued straight on to intersect with Wisconsin Avenue (then US 10) at the north entrance road to the Fox River Mall in Appleton. The road was realigned as part of a large project that realigned US 10 and US 45. Essentially, the road south of Greenville became an extension of WIS 76, and WIS 15 is now the sole route number on the current stretch.

Between 2022 and 2024, the Wisconsin Department of Transportation (WisDOT) completed an expansion and reconstruction project between US 45 in New London to WIS 76 in Greenville. The entire length of WIS 15 was converted into a four-lane divided expressway as part of the project which was previously a two-lane undivided highway. Also included was the construction of a bypass section of Hortonville which completed in 2023; the previous alignment through Hortonville is now designated as an extension of CTH-JJ.

Between 2024 and 2025, the eastern terminus at I-41/CTH-OO in Grand Chute was reconstructed as a diverging diamond interchange as part of the larger I-41/US-41 expansion project between Appleton and De Pere.

== Major intersections ==
The entire route is in Outagamie County.

Location	mi	km	Destinations	Notes
Town of Hortonia	0.00	0.00	US 45 – Appleton, Clintonville, Marion, Antigo, Oshkosh Bus. US 45 / CTH-T – Appleton	Western end of CTH-T concurrency; roadway continues as Bus. US 45/CTH-T
Town of Hortonia	3.18	5.12	CTH-T south (Givens Road) – Dale CTH-JJ east (West Main Street) – Hortonville	Eastern end of CTH-T concurrency
Hortonville	5.16	8.30	CTH-M (Dash Street) – Medina, Winchester	Converted to overpass
Town of Greenville	7.23	11.64	CTH-JJ (West Broadway Drive)	
Community of Greenville	10.98	17.67	WIS 76 (Municipal Drive) – Oshkosh, Shiocton	
Town of Greenville	12.75	20.52	CTH-CB (Greenville Drive) – Appleton International Airport	
Town of Grand Chute	14.8	23.8	I-41 / US 41 – Milwaukee, Green Bay CTH-OO east (West Northland Avenue) – Appleton, Little Chute	Roadway continues as CTH-OO
1.000 mi = 1.609 km; 1.000 km = 0.621 mi: Closed/former; Concurrency terminus
