= Grand Chute, Wisconsin =

- Town
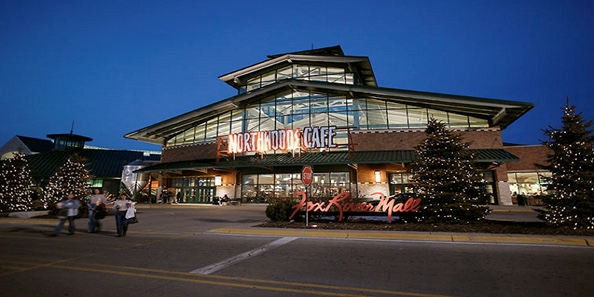
- Fox River Mall

- Logo
- Motto(s): Tradition and Progress
- Interactive map of Grand Chute, Wisconsin
- Location within Wisconsin
- Coordinates: 44.2937°N 88.4530°W
- Country: United States
- State: Wisconsin
- County: Outagamie
- Established: April 3, 1849

Government
  - Type: Town Board
  - Chairperson: Beth English
  - Vice-Chair: Brad Gehring
  - Board Members: Mark Heling; Rhonda Daily; Anthony Lehrer

Area
  - Town: 22.129 sq mi (57.314 km^{2})
  - Land: 22.036 sq mi (57.072 km^{2})
  - Water: 0.093 sq mi (0.242 km^{2}) 0.42%
- Elevation: 791 ft (241 m)

Population (2020)
  - Town: 23,831
  - Estimate (2025): 24,579
  - Rank: WI: 1st
  - Density: 1,081.5/sq mi (417.56/km^{2})
  - Urban: 230,967 (US: 169th)
  - Metro: 249,876 (US: 197th)
  - Combined: 424,094 (US: 99th)
- Time zone: UTC–6 (Central (CST))
  - Summer (DST): UTC–5 (CDT)
- ZIP Codes: 54913, 54914
- Area codes: 920 and 274
- FIPS code: 55-087-30075
- GNIS feature ID: 1583295
- Website: grandchutewi.gov

Grand Chute (French: great fall or "large rapids") is a town in Outagamie County, Wisconsin, United States. The population was 23,831 as of the 2020 census, and was estimated at 24,579 in 2025.

It is part of the Appleton metropolitan area. The unincorporated community of Apple Creek is partially located in the town.

== History ==
The Town of Grand Chute was formed on April 3, 1849 inside what was then Brown County. By state legislative act, Grand Chute was split off of the Town of Kaukaulan (later Kaukauna). The Town of Grand Chute's boundary at its establishment comprised a much larger area than it has today, formed by what today are the towns of Dale, Hortonia, Greenville, Ellington, and present-day Grand Chute. By 1850, due to a large influx of new settlers, the towns of Hortonia (which included Dale at the time), Greenville, and Ellington had all been split away from Grand Chute to form new towns.

Outagamie County was set up by law in February 1851 and had its county government formally organized on April 1, 1851. At that time, the Town of Grand Chute (which by definition changed from Brown to Outagamie County) was established as the seat of county government affairs.

Grand Chute's population in 1984 was estimated to be 10,874. In March of that year, residents overwhelmingly approved using town funds to attempt incorporation into a village. After town hearings in late 1984, Grand Chute petitioned to the State of Wisconsin. The Wisconsin Department of Development denied the town's request to incorporate on March 25, 1985. At the time of the denial, the DOD's findings were that some (but not necessarily all) government services would be better provided by the City of Appleton, and that the proposed village was not compact or homogenous.

== Geography ==
According to the United States Census Bureau, the town has an area of 22.129 square miles (57.31 km^{2}), of which 22.036 square miles (57.07 km^{2}) is land and 0.093 square miles (0.24 km^{2}) (0.42%) is water.

== Demographics ==
Historical population
Census	Pop.	Note	%±
1860	770		—
1870	1,390		80.5%
1880	1,578		13.5%
1890	1,574		−0.3%
1900	1,722		9.4%
1910	1,849		7.4%
1920	2,018		9.1%
1930	2,741		35.8%
1940	3,814		39.1%
1950	5,948		56.0%
1960	5,035		−15.3%
1970	7,089		40.8%
1980	9,529		34.4%
1990	14,490		52.1%
2000	18,392		26.9%
2010	20,919		13.7%
2020	23,831		13.9%
2025 (est.)	24,579		3.1%
U.S. Decennial Census; 2020 Census

=== 2020 census ===
As of the 2020 census, there were 23,831 people, 10,830 households, and 6,017 families residing in the town.

=== 2010 census ===
As of the 2010 census, there were 20,919 people, 9,378 households, and 5,390 families residing in the town. The population density was 836.8 people per square mile (323.8/km^{2}). There were 9,932 housing units at an average density of 397.3 per square mile (153.7/km^{2}). The racial makeup of the town was 89.3% White, 1.4% African American, 0.4% Native American, 4.5% Asian, 0.1% Pacific Islander, 2.5% from other races, and 1.6% from two or more races. 4.9% of the population were Hispanic or Latino of any race.

There were 9,378 households, out of which 25.0% had children under the age of 18 living with them, 45.9% were married couples living together, 7.9% had a female householder with no husband present, and 42.5% were non-families. 32.9% of all households were made up of individuals, and 10.1% had someone living alone who was 65 years of age or older. The average household size was 2.21 and the average family size was 2.84.

In the town, the population was spread out, with 20.0% under the age of 18, 10.3% from 18 to 24, 27.3% from 25 to 44, 28.0% from 45 to 64, and 14.4% who were 65 years of age or older. The median age was 38.8 years. For every 100 females there were 94.6 males.

The median income for a household in the town was $52,813, and the median income for a family was $69,224. Males had a median income of $50,483 versus $37,073 for females. The per capita income for the town was $32,557. 8.9% of the population and 3.4% of families were below the poverty line. 9.3% of those under the age of 18 and 5.6% of those 65 and older were living below the poverty line.

=== 2000 census ===
As of the 2000 census, there were 18,392 people, 7,586 households, and 4,688 families residing in the town. The population density was 739.1 people per square mile (285.3/km^{2}). There were 7,965 housing units at an average density of 320.1 per square mile (123.6/km^{2}). The racial makeup of the town was 94.28% White, 0.77% African American, 0.40% Native American, 1.52% Asian, 0.08% Pacific Islander, 1.87% from other races, and 1.08% from two or more races. 3.53% of the population were Hispanic or Latino of any race.

There were 7,586 households, out of which 29.6% had children under the age of 18 living with them, 53.2% were married couples living together, 5.9% had a female householder with no husband present, and 38.2% were non-families. 28.6% of all households were made up of individuals, and 8.5% had someone living alone who was 65 years of age or older. The average household size was 2.38 and the average family size was 3.00.

In the town, the population was spread out, with 23.4% under the age of 18, 11.2% from 18 to 24, 31.2% from 25 to 44, 22.6% from 45 to 64, and 11.6% who were 65 years of age or older. The median age was 35 years. For every 100 females there were 99.2 males. For every 100 females age 18 and over, there were 96.6 males.

The median income for a household in the town was $50,772, and the median income for a family was $61,780. Males had a median income of $42,084 versus $27,346 for females. The per capita income for the town was $25,189. 5.3% of the population and 2.7% of families were below the poverty line, including 4.7% of those under the age of 18 and 7.5% of those ages 65 and older.

== Economy ==
Grand Chute, home to Fox River Mall, is the most concentrated retail center in Wisconsin.

== Transportation ==
The town is served by Valley Transit, a network of bus lines serving the Fox Valley. There are also several taxi operators in the town. Valley Transit operates routes that generally operate from as early as 5:45 AM until as late as 10:40 PM Monday through Saturday. Frequencies are usually every hour and every half-hour on certain routes during peak morning and afternoon times on weekdays. There is no service on Sunday. Greyhound and Lamers offer intercity buses serving such locations as Green Bay, Madison, Oshkosh, Fond du Lac, Milwaukee, and Chicago.

=== Roads ===
Interstate 41 Northbound routes to Green Bay. Southbound I-41 routes to Oshkosh, Fond du Lac, and Milwaukee. This is a full interstate grade freeway that runs on the west and north sides of the town. It has 5 exits in Grand Chute at: Hwy BB Prospect Ave. (Exit 136) WIS 125/Hwy CA College Ave.(Exit 137), WIS 96 Wisconsin Ave. (Exit 138), WIS 15/Hwy OO Northland Ave.(Exit 139), WIS 47 Richmond St. (Exit 142)
US 41 runs entirely concurrently with Interstate 41 through the city of Appleton.
WIS 15 Westbound routes to New London. This is partly Northland Ave.
WIS 96 travels west to Fremont and travels east to Little Chute and Kaukauna. This is Wisconsin Ave.
WIS 125 travels between US 41 and WIS 47 on College Ave. College Ave. west of I-41 is Hwy CA.
County CA travels west to Greenville. It connects I-41 with Appleton International Airport.

=== Airport ===
The Appleton International Airport (ATW) is located at the west end of College Avenue, 2 miles (3.2 km) west of Interstate 41. The airport is served by four airlines that service 16 destinations around the United States.

== Points of interest ==
- Butte des Morts Country Club
- Community First Champion Center
- Fox River Mall and surrounding shopping district (the largest concentration of retail in Wisconsin)
- Fox Valley Technical College
- Gordon Bubolz Nature Preserve
- Grand Chute Trail System
- John Birch Society
- Plamann Park
- Neuroscience Group Field at Fox Cities Stadium, home of the Wisconsin Timber Rattlers, a Class A affiliate of the Milwaukee Brewers

== Gallery ==
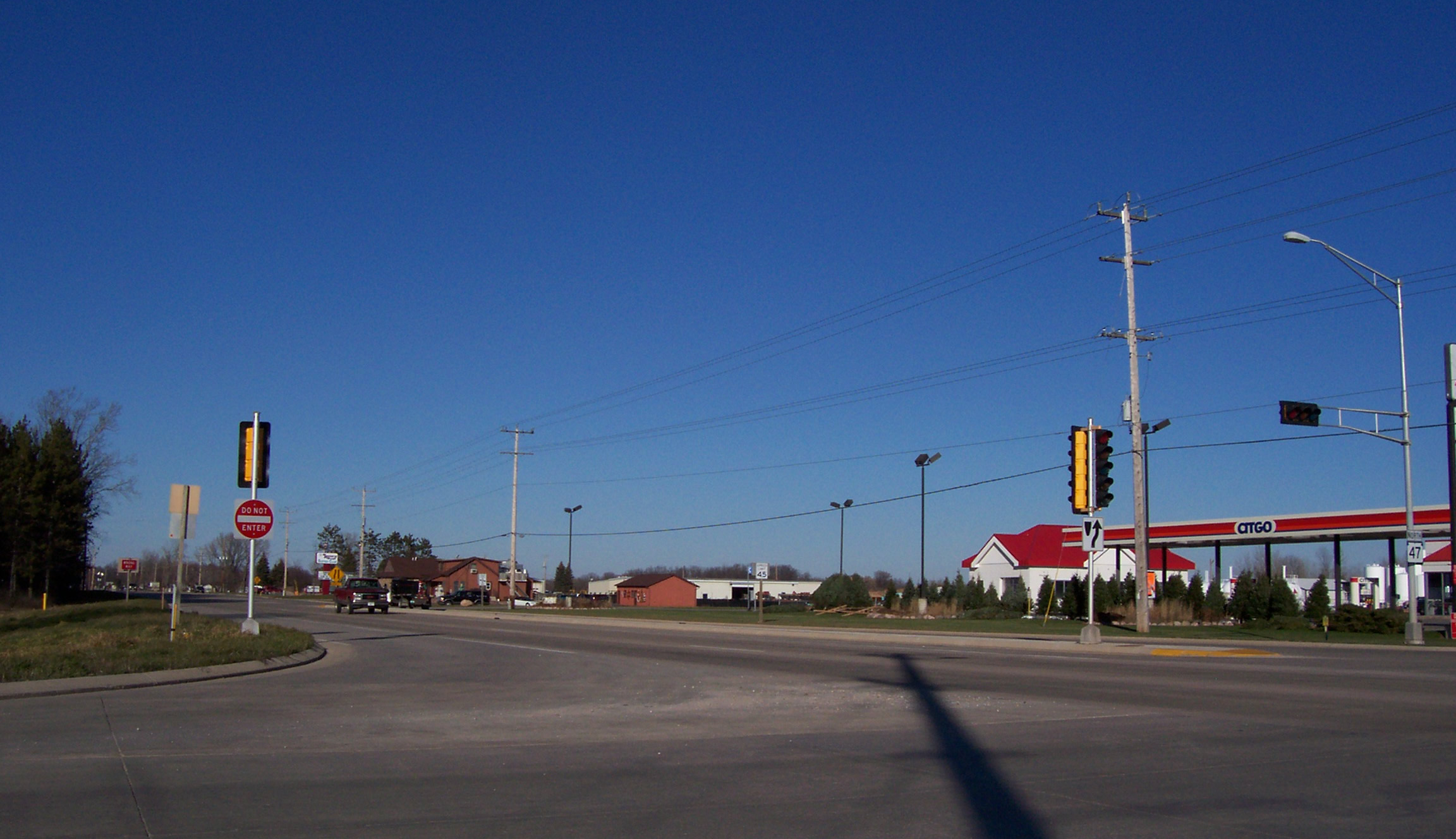
WIS Highway 47

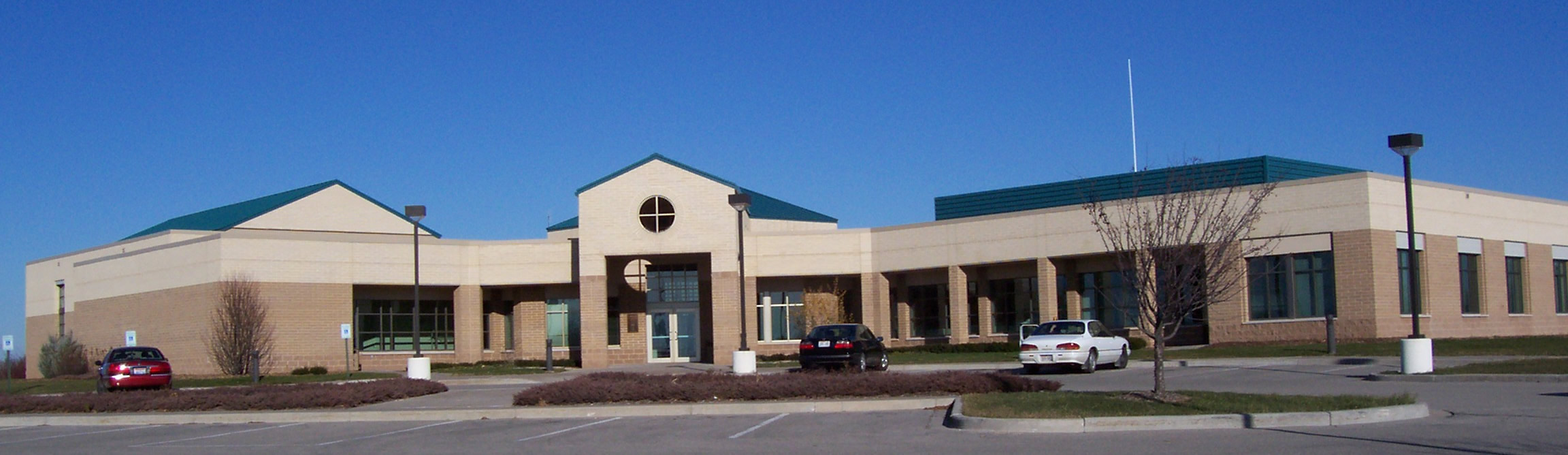
Town Hall

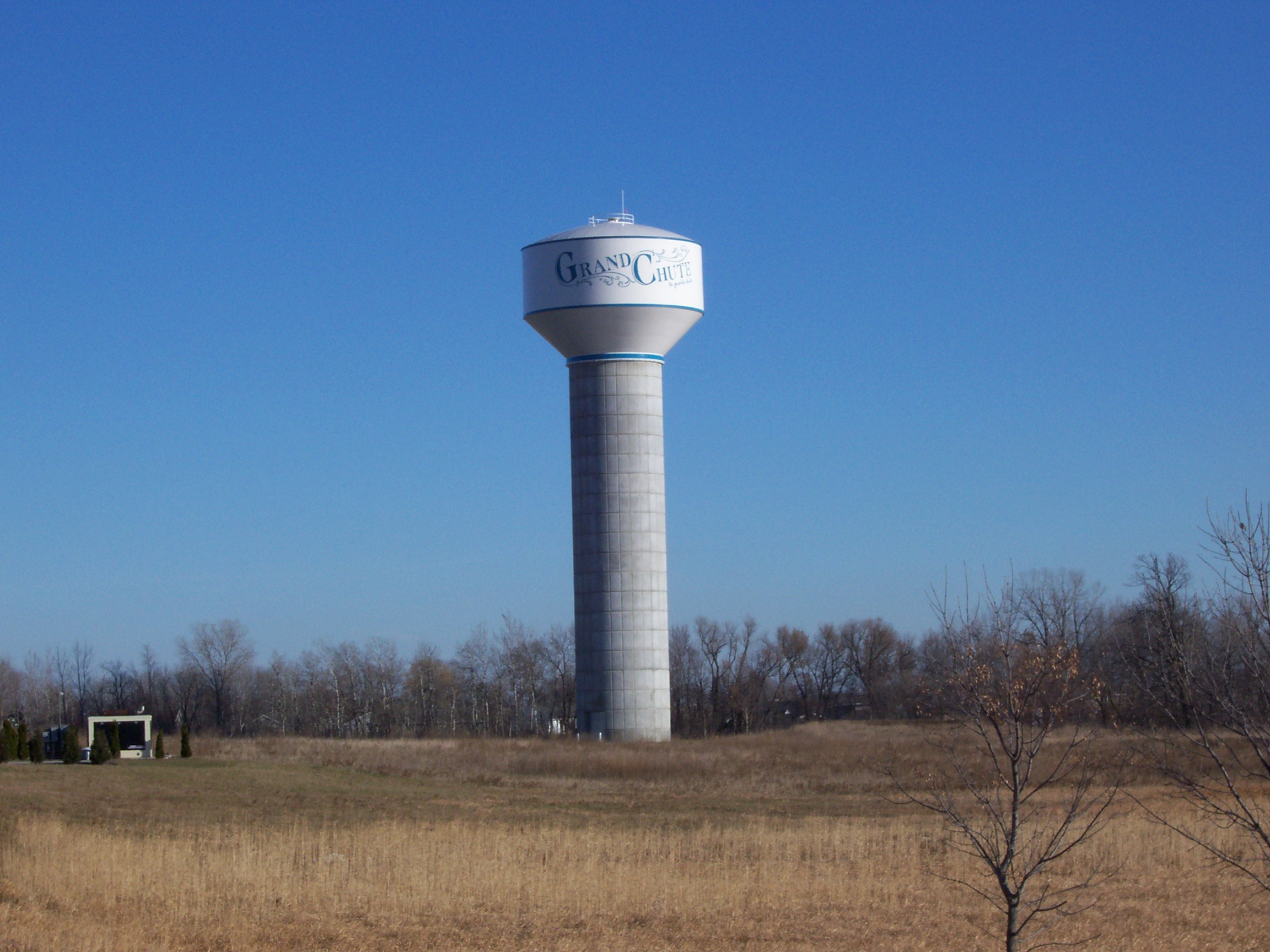
Water tower

== Notable people ==
- Clinton B. Ballard, Wisconsin State Representative
- Louis L. Jabas, Wisconsin State Representative
- August W. Laabs, Wisconsin State Representative
- Joseph McCarthy, U.S. Senator
- George J. Schneider, U.S. Representative
