= Community First Champion Center =

Arena located in Grand Chute, Wisconsin

- Logo

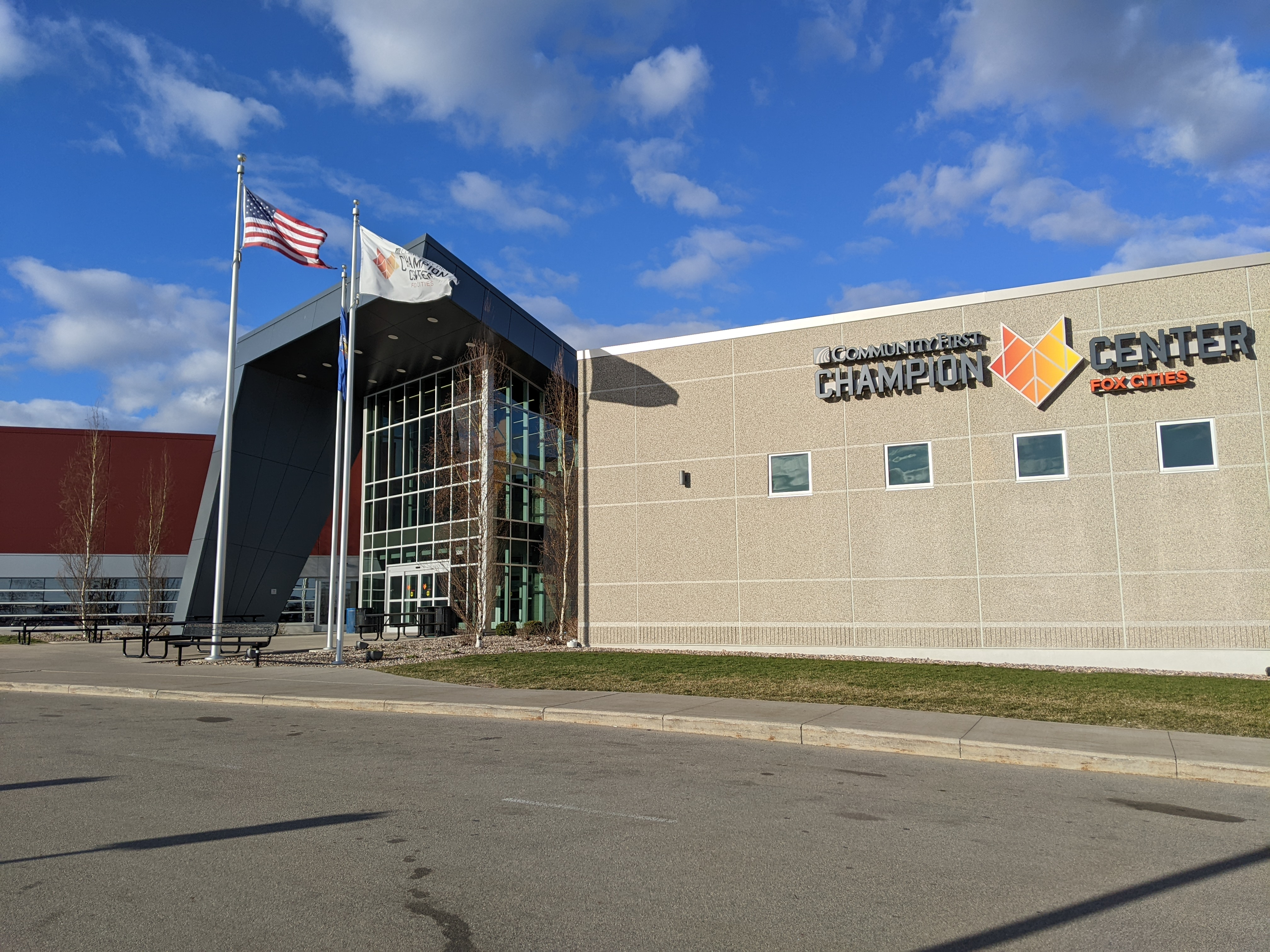
- Main entrance gate
- Interactive map of Community First Champion Center
- Full name: Community First Champion Center Fox Cities
- Address: 2200 North McCarthy Road; Grand Chute, Wisconsin, United States
- Coordinates: 44°16′57″N 88°28′51″W
- Owner: Town of Grand Chute
- Capacity: ~3,000 - 4,000 total across all 3 spaces
- Type: Multi-purpose arena
- Events: Sporting events and concerts
- Scoreboard: Yes

Construction
- Groundbreaking: September 18, 2018
- Built: 2018–2019
- Opened: November 20, 2019; 6 years ago
- Cost: $30 million ($38.5 million in 2025 dollars)
- Architect: Performa Architects
- General contractor: Miron Construction

Website
- championcenterwi.com

The Community First Champion Center is a 164,000 sq ft (15,200 m^{2}) indoor sports center in Grand Chute, a suburb of Appleton in the U.S. state of Wisconsin. The facility is primarily used for youth and community sporting events.

The sports center was expected to cost $30 million to build. The cost of construction was provided by a 3% hotel-room tax being charged throughout the Fox Cities region; this tax was also used to pay for the Fox Cities Exhibition Center. Shortly before its opening, it was expected to contribute around $8–12 million to the Fox Cities economy.

== Location and design ==
The arena is located along County Highway GV just north of the Fox River Mall shopping district and less than .5 mi (0.80 km) west of Fox Cities Stadium. The new arena broke ground on September 18, 2018. It opened in November 2019.

The Center has three separate arena spaces with one being permanently set up with an ice rink and another two multi-purpose arenas which could handle court sports, concerts, or additional ice rinks. The total capacity of all three arenas is between 3,000 and 4,000.

== History ==
On January 23, 2019, the center was the target of vandalism by a group of teenagers who damaged construction sites around the Appleton area and started fires in downtown parking ramp elevators. The damage to the center was expected to cost over $1 million.

On March 22, 2019, the Town of Grand Chute announced that the naming rights for the center were bought by Community First Credit Union; terms of the deal have not been released.
