= Greenville, Wisconsin =

- Village
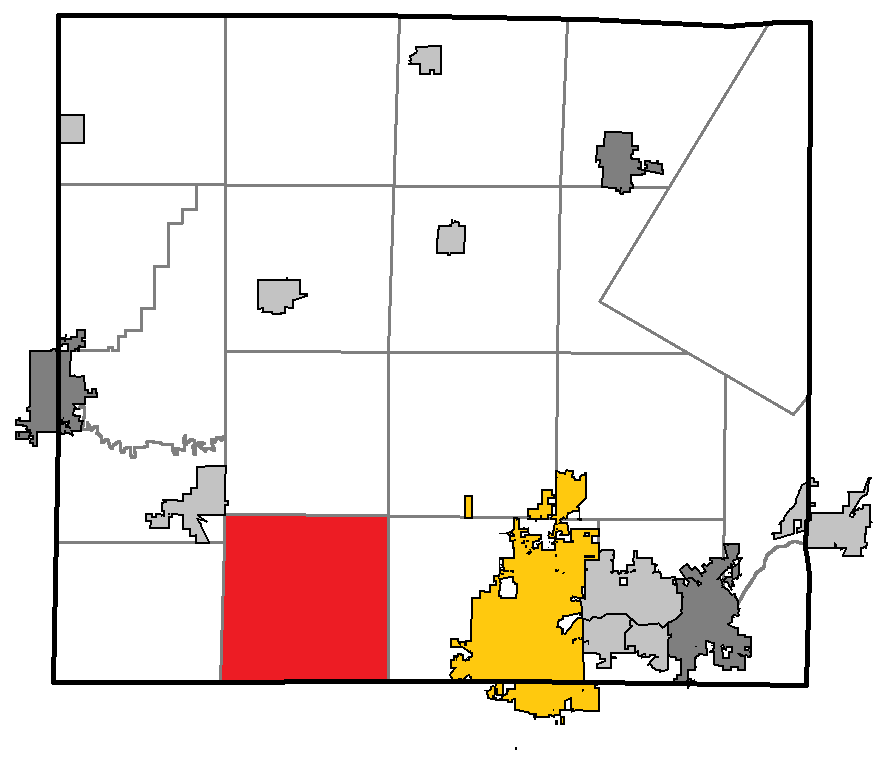
- Location of Greenville, within Outagamie County

- Location within Wisconsin Location within the United States
- Coordinates: 44°17′15″N 88°31′33″W
- Country: United States
- State: Wisconsin
- Counties: Outagamie
- Surrounding towns: Clayton, Dale, Ellington, Grand Chute, Hortonia, Menasha
- Settled: 1848

Government
  - Village President: Jack Anderson

Area
  - Total: 35.8 sq mi (93 km^{2})
  - Land: 35.8 sq mi (93 km^{2})
  - Water: 0.04 sq mi (0.10 km^{2}) 0.06%
- Elevation: 827 ft (252 m)

Population (2020)
  - Total: 12,687
  - Density: 354/sq mi (137/km^{2})
- Time zone: UTC-6 (CST)
  - Summer (DST): UTC-5 (CDT)
- ZIP Code: 54913, 54942, 54944
- Area code(s): 274 & 920
- FIPS code: 55-31550
- GNIS feature ID: 2829852
- Website: greenvillewi.gov

Greenville is a village in Outagamie County, Wisconsin, United States. It is one of 18 communities that form the basis of the Fox Cities, the third largest metropolitan area in Wisconsin. The population was 12,687 in 2020.

== History ==
The town was founded in 1848 as Greenville Station, and changed its name to Becher in 1879 (named after the first postmaster, Anton Becher (1842-1931)). Its name was changed to Greenville in 1896.

After an incorporation attempt was denied by the Wisconsin Incorporation Review Board, the town held a referendum for a partial incorporation in November 2020. The eastern half of the community incorporated as a village in January 2021, and annexed the remnant western half of the original town in June 2021. This makes it one of the largest villages in the State of Wisconsin by area and population.

== Geography ==
According to the United States Census Bureau, the village has a total area of 35.8 square miles (92.7 km^{2}), of which 35.8 square miles (92.7 km^{2}) is land and 0.04 square mile (0.1 km^{2}) (0.06%) is water.

The former unincorporated community of Greenville and the ghost town of Wakefield are in the village.

== Demographics ==
Greenville is a part of the Appleton, Wisconsin metropolitan area and the Appleton-Oshkosh-Neenah, Wisconsin Combined Statistical Area.

As of the census of 2000, there were 6,844 people, 2,301 households, and 1,937 families residing in the town. The population density was 191.2 people per square mile (73.8/km^{2}). There were 2,353 housing units at an average density of 65.7 per square mile (25.4/km^{2}). The racial makeup of the town was 98.25% White, 0.22% African American, 0.29% Native American, 0.20% Asian, 0.07% Pacific Islander, 0.39% from other races, and 0.57% from two or more races. Hispanic or Latino of any race were 1.59% of the population.

There were 2,301 households, out of which 48.4% had children under the age of 18 living with them, 75.4% were married couples living together, 5.6% had a female householder with no husband present, and 15.8% were non-families. 11.9% of all households were made up of individuals, and 2.7% had someone living alone who was 65 years of age or older. The average household size was 2.97 and the average family size was 3.24.

In the town, the population was spread out, with 32.5% under the age of 18, 5.2% from 18 to 24, 36.2% from 25 to 44, 20.9% from 45 to 64, and 5.2% who were 65 years of age or older. The median age was 34 years. For every 100 females, there were 106.1 males. For every 100 females age 18 and over, there were 103.5 males.

The median income for a household in the town was $61,381, and the median income for a family was $65,706. Males had a median income of $45,594 versus $29,360 for females. The per capita income for the town was $22,164. About 1.4% of families and 2.0% of the population were below the poverty line, including 0.9% of those under age 18 and 6.4% of those age 65 or over.

== Economy ==
Appleton International Airport is the economic engine for the community, with many of the village's largest employers located in business parks surrounding the airport. Air Wisconsin, the largest privately owned regional airline in the country, is headquartered in Greenville. Other businesses include School Specialty, the village's largest employer; Amazon; Federal Express; Gulfstream Aerospace; VF Corporation; Miller Electric; Plexus; Oshkosh Corporation; Badger Plug; Valley Bakers Cooperative; Sonoco Products; Asten Johnson; and Zebra Technologies.

== Government ==
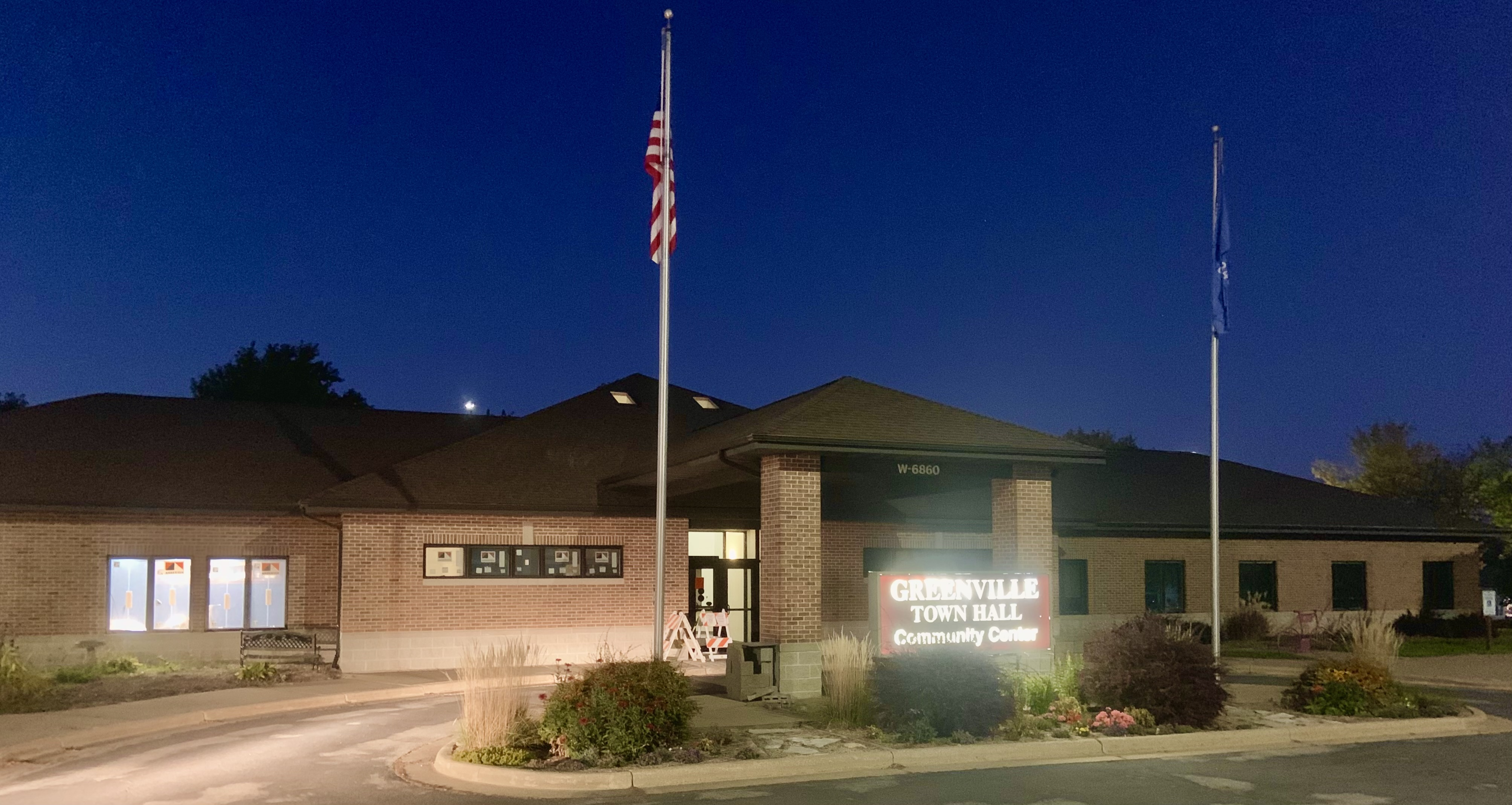
Greenville Village Hall

=== Local ===
Greenville is governed by an elected five-member village board consisting of a president, vice president, and three trustees. The village is represented on the Outagamie County Board with officials from Districts 32 & 33.

=== State ===
Official	Party	Took office	Representing:
State Sen. Rachael Cabral-Guevara	Republican	2023	19th State Senate District
Rep. David Murphy	Republican	2013	56th Assembly District

=== Federal ===
Official	Party	Took office	Representing:
Sen. Tammy Baldwin	Democratic	2013	State of Wisconsin
Sen. Ron Johnson	Republican	2011	State of Wisconsin
Rep. Tony Wied	Republican	2024	Wisconsin's 8th District

== Education ==
Public instruction is provided by the Hortonville Area School District. The district maintains three elementary schools, two middle schools, a high school, and an independent learning center. Parochial schools include Immanuel Lutheran School and St. Mary of the Immaculate Conception Catholic School.

=== Public schools ===
- Greenville Elementary School – serves grades Pre-K–4; enrollment of 733 students
- North Greenville Elementary School – serves grades Pre-K–4
- Greenville Middle School – serves grades 5–8; enrollment of 555 students

=== Private schools ===
- Immanuel Lutheran School – serves grades Pre-K–8; enrollment of 238 students
- St. Mary of the Immaculate Conception Catholic School – serves grades 3K–8; enrollment of 183 students

The Fox Valley Technical College Public Safety Training Center is in Greenville and provides training for law enforcement, firefighters, and emergency medical services personnel.

== Religion ==
Churches in Greenville include:

- Christus Lutheran Church
- Faith Community United Methodist Church
- Immanuel Lutheran Church (WELS)
- Shepherd of the Hills Lutheran Church
- St. Mary of the Immaculate Conception Catholic Parish

== Transportation ==
Appleton International Airport is located in Greenville. The airport is the headquarters for regional airline carrier, Air Wisconsin, and is the original home of Midwest Airlines.

WIS 15 (Greenville Drive) travels east to Grand Chute and west to Hortonville and New London.
WIS 76 (Municipal Drive) travels south to Oshkosh and north to Shiocton.
WIS 96 (Wisconsin Avenue) travels east to Grand Chute and Appleton and west to Fremont.
County BB (Prospect Avenue and Winnegamie Drive) travels east to Appleton.
County CA (College Avenue) travels east to Grand Chute where it becomes WIS 125.
County CB (West Side Arterial) travels south to Fox Crossing and Neenah.
County JJ (Broadway Drive) travels east to Kaukauna and west to Hortonville.

Greenville is located 1.5 miles (2.4 km) west of Interstate 41 and 1.8 miles (2.9 km) north of U.S. Route 10

The Yellowstone Trail National Historic Automobile Route also passes through Greenville.

== Parks and recreation ==
The Village maintains approximately 210 acres (0.85 km^{2}) of parkland at 10 facilities located throughout the community. These include:

- Amber Woods – a 7.6-acre (31,000 m^{2}) undeveloped woodland site; a trail system is planned for this area in the future.
- Appletree Square – a 2-acre (8,100 m^{2}) mini-park that includes a crab apple tree arboretum, access to the Greenville Trail System, and a connection to Jennerjohn Park.
- Community Park – a 20-acre (81,000 m^{2}) community park that is the village's primary site for recreational activities. It includes four ball diamonds, bleachers, a pavilion, kitchen facilities, two restroom buildings, a concessions building, play equipment, a tennis court, two half-court basketball courts, and access to the Greenville Trail System.
- Field of Dreams – a 75-acre (300,000 m^{2}) undeveloped parcel whose master plan calls for five ball diamonds, a heritage garden, soccer fields, tennis courts, basketball courts, picnic shelters, and a natural area with trails.
- Glen Valley Park – a 2.2-acre (8,900 m^{2}) park with a play equipment. It is not connected to the Greenville Trail System.
- Elder Brook Park (previously Glen Valley Park) – a 8.5-acre (34,000 m^{2}) neighborhood park with a pond and a trail system
- Jennerjohn Park – a 25-acre (100,000 m^{2}) neighborhood park with a baseball diamond, play equipment, two tennis courts, a heritage fountain, a sledding hill and ice rink, and access to the Greenville Trail System. It is also connected to Appletree Square.
- Kimberly Court Park – a 0.75-acre (3,000 m^{2}) mini-park that includes a conifer arboretum and access to the Greenville Trail System
- Lions Park – a 57-acre (230,000 m^{2}) community park that includes a pond, nature trails, four shelters, a 10,000-seat amphitheater, a playground, and access to the Greenville Trail System
- Memorial Square – a mini-park located in front of the Greenville Public Safety Building that has memorials dedicated to area veterans, firefighters, and police officers
- Pebble Ridge Park – a 13-acre (53,000 m^{2}) neighborhood park that includes a mature woodland, pond, and walking trails

The Wisconsin Department of Natural Resources-managed Heath Van Handel Memorial Forest is in Greenville. The 39-acre forest was previously a nursery, test area, and arboretum for the Institute of Paper Chemistry.

Greenville events include:

- Annual catfish races

== Points of interest ==
- Appleton International Airport
- Chaska Golf Course
- Fox West YMCA
- Yellowstone Trail National Historic Automobile Route

== In popular culture ==
The village of Greenville is the basis of a vehicle simulation role-playing video game on Roblox called "Greenville RP", consisting of a recreation of the town in virtual form.

== Images ==
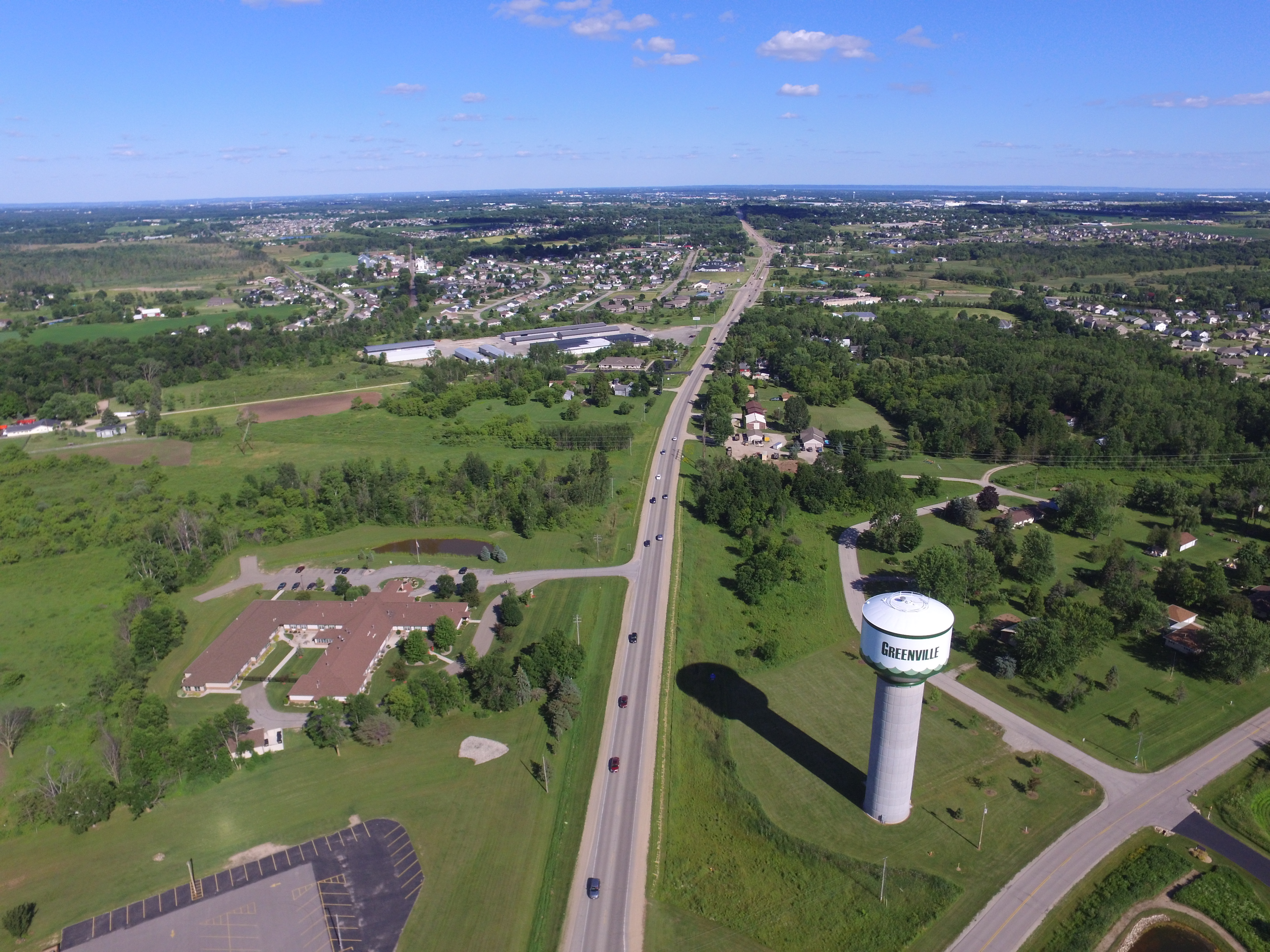
An aerial photo of Greenville, WI looking southeast down Hwy 15

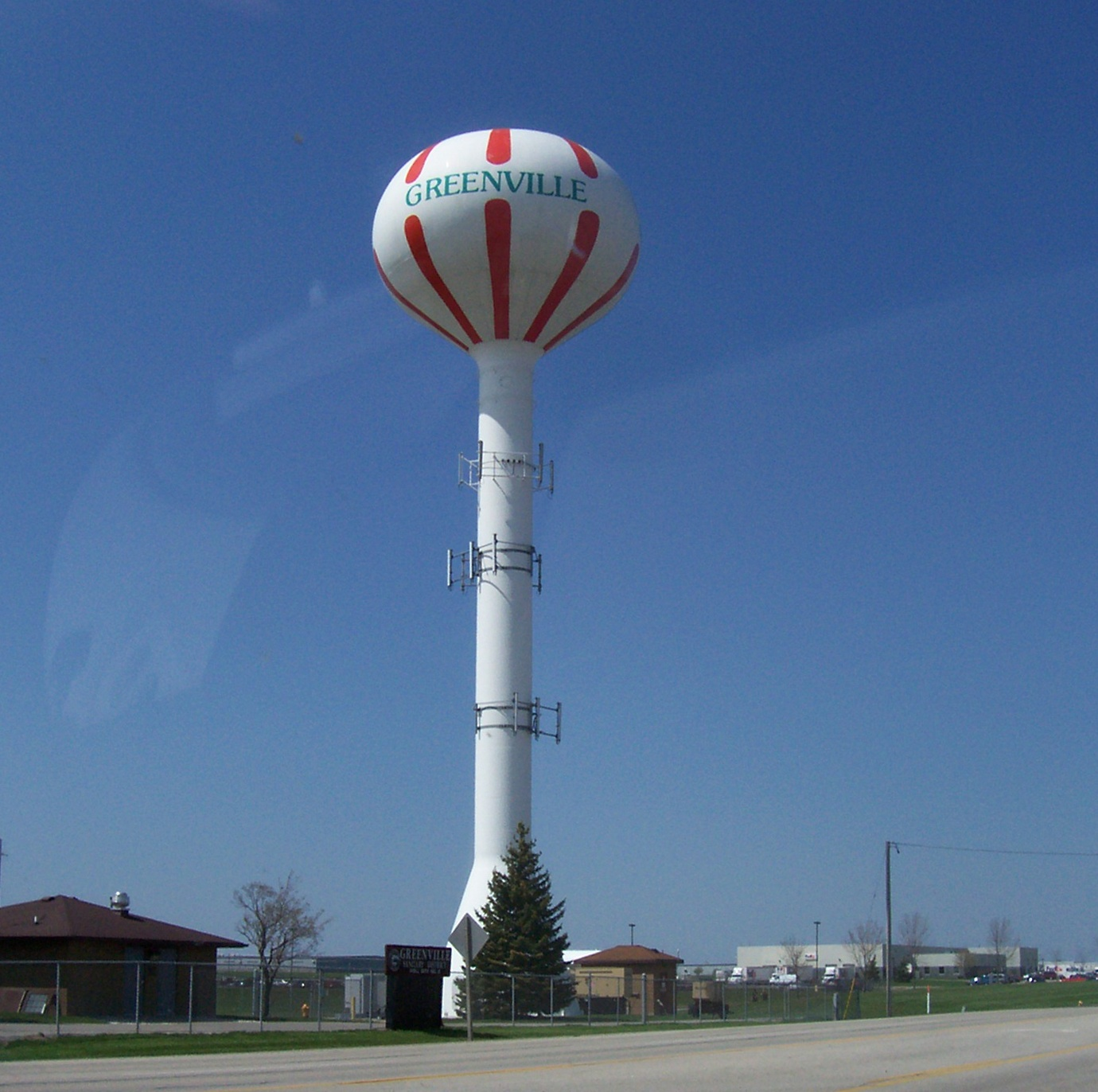
Airport Water Tower, since repainted
