= Wisconsin Highway 76 =

Highway in Wisconsin

State Trunk Highway 76
- WIS-76 highlighted in red

Route information
- Maintained by WisDOT
- Length: 43.40 mi (69.85 km)

Major junctions
- South end: US 45 in Oshkosh
- I-41 / US 41 in Oshkosh; US 10 in Menasha
- North end: US 45 / WIS 22 in Bear Creek

Location
- Country: United States
- State: Wisconsin
- Counties: Winnebago, Outagamie, Waupaca

Highway system
- Wisconsin State Trunk Highway System; Interstate; US; State; Scenic; Rustic
← WIS 75	→ WIS 77

State Trunk Highway 76 (often called Highway 76, STH-76 or WIS 76) is a state highway in the U.S. state of Wisconsin. It runs north–south in east central Wisconsin from US Highway 45 near Bear Creek to a junction with US Highway 45 in downtown Oshkosh.

The southern section of the present WIS 76 highway between the current WIS 15 (formerly US Highway 45) at Greenville and Oshkosh was previously part of US Highway 45 but was changed to Wisconsin State Highway 76 in the 1990s as an effect of the rerouting of US Highway 45 to a more westerly trunkline via Winchester, Wisconsin.

The northern section of WIS 76 between Greenville and Bear Creek via Shiocton is remarkably unchanged since the 1920s and passes through rural areas. The trunkline between Greenville and Shiocton via Stephensville is particularly scenic with views over the gently undulating and unspoiled countryside.

== Route description ==
Wisconsin Highway 76 (WIS 76) begins at a roundabout intersection of West Murdock Avenue and Jackson Street in Oshkosh. It runs north on Jackson Street and leaves Oshkosh. North of Oshkosh, it crosses Interstate 41 (I-41) and bypasses Neenah. Proceeding north, the highway crosses US Route 10 (US 10) and passes Appleton International Airport as it bypasses Appleton, where it also crosses WIS 96 and WIS 15. The highway continues north. In Shiocton the route runs concurrently with WIS 54 before leaving to go north. The highway follows a northwesterly alignment before ending at an intersection with US 45 and WIS 22.

== History ==
Initially, WIS 76 traveled along present-day CTH-E and CTH-O from WIS 54 near Casco to WIS 17 (now WIS 42) near Rostok. In 1923, WIS 76 was moved from its Door Peninsula route to mostly the northernmost part of its modern route. This was done in favor of assigning CTH-O to WIS 76's former route and replacing WIS 122. The new route traveled from WIS 18 near Appleton to WIS 22/WIS 26 (WIS 26 is now US 45) west of Bear Creek.

By 1999, the southernmost part of WIS 76 (former WIS 122) was removed in favor of re-adding WIS 15 and preparing for the construction of the proposed US 10 and US 45 expressways. In 2003, WIS 76 was extended southward along former US 45 to downtown Oshkosh.

== Major intersections ==
County	Location	mi	km	Destinations	Notes
Winnebago	Oshkosh	0.0	0.0	US 45 (Jackson Street) / Murdock Avenue	Roundabout
Winnebago	Oshkosh	4.0	6.4	I-41 / US 41 – Green Bay, Milwaukee	I-41 exit 124
Winnebago	Town of Clayton	12.3	19.8	US 10 – Manitowoc, Stevens Point	
Outagamie	Town of Greenville	16.2	26.1	WIS 96 – Appleton, Fremont	
Outagamie	Community of Greenville	18.1	29.1	WIS 15 – Appleton, Hortonville	
Outagamie	Shiocton	30.3	48.8	WIS 54 east – Green Bay	Eastern end of WIS 54 overlap
Outagamie	Shiocton	30.7	49.4	WIS 54 west – New London, Waupaca	Western end of WIS 54 overlap
Waupaca	Town of Bear Creek	43.4	69.8	US 45 – Clintonville, New London WIS 22 west – Manawa	Roadway continues as WIS 22
1.000 mi = 1.609 km; 1.000 km = 0.621 mi: Concurrency terminus
