= Wakefield, Wisconsin =

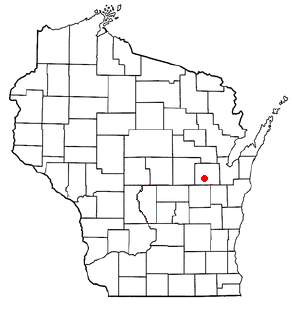
- Location of Wakefield, Wisconsin
- Coordinates: 44°15′56.33″N 88°32′13.52″W
- Country: United States
- State: Wisconsin
- County: Outagamie
- Elevation: 892 ft (272 m)
- Time zone: UTC-6 (Central (CST))
  - Summer (DST): UTC-5 (CDT)
- ZIP Codes: 54914
- Area code: (920)

Wakefield is a former unincorporated community in Outagamie County, Wisconsin, United States. It is located in the village of Greenville.

Wakefield had a post office from 1852 to 1879, on land that is now occupied by Appleton International Airport. The post office (and by extension the community) was named after a Greenville settler, J. Wakefield.

On December 26 1887, the town burned. The New York Times reported the post office, bank, jewelry store and theatre along with a dozen saloons were all destroyed. The fire began in the Coliseum Theatre when a monkey overturned a lamp.

== Geography ==
Wakefield is located at 44°15′56.33″N 88°32′13.52″W (44.265647, -88.537089) and has an elevation of 892 feet (272m).
