= Clinton B. Ballard =

American politician

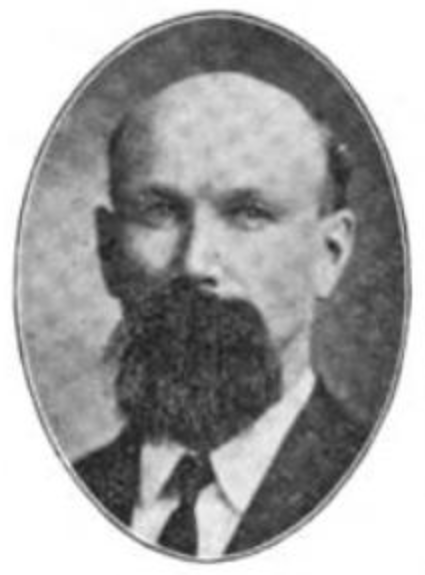

Member of the Wisconsin State Assembly
- Constituency: Outagamie County
- In office 1908–1912
- In office 1914–1916
- In office 1918–1920

Personal details
- Born: Clinton Broadwell Ballard; November 16, 1860 Appleton, Wisconsin
- Died: January 1, 1946 (aged 85) Appleton, Wisconsin
- Party: Republican
- Occupation: Farmer, politician

Clinton Broadwell Ballard (November 16, 1860 – January 1, 1946) was an American farmer and politician.

== Biography ==
Born in Appleton, Wisconsin, Ballard was a farmer and lived in the town of Grand Chute, Outagamie County, Wisconsin. Ballard served on the Outagamie County Board of Supervisors and was a supporter of United States Senator Robert M. La Follette, Sr. In 1909, 1911, 1915, and 1919, Ballard served in the Wisconsin State Assembly and was a Republican.

After Ballard left office, he was appointed Wisconsin Treasury Agent and then Wisconsin Superintendent of Public Property. In 1926, he ran for the Republican nomination for Wisconsin State Treasurer and lost the election. Then Ballard opened a grocery store in Glen Oaks, Wisconsin on Old Middleton Road.

Ballard died at his daughter's house in Appleton as a result of a stroke.
