= August W. Laabs =

American politician

August Laabs

Member of the Wisconsin State Assembly
- In office 1933–1935

Personal details
- Born: October 26, 1873 Milwaukee, Wisconsin
- Died: December 23, 1941 (aged 68) Appleton, Wisconsin
- Party: Republican

August W. Laabs (October 26, 1873 – December 23, 1941) was an American farmer, businessman, and politician who served as a member of the Wisconsin State Assembly from 1933 to 1935.

== Early life ==
Born in Milwaukee, Wisconsin, Laabs was worked as a telegraph operator and was a train dispatcher for the Chicago and North Western Transportation Company.

== Career ==
He lived in Appleton, Wisconsin and owned the Wisconsin Rendering Company. Laabs also owned several farms and was in the real estate business. Laabs served as chairman of the Grand Chute, Wisconsin Town Board and on the Appleton Common Council. He also served on the Outagamie County, Wisconsin Board of Supervisors. In 1933 and 1935, Laabs served in the Wisconsin State Assembly as a Republican.

== Death ==
Laabs died of heart disease in Appleton, Wisconsin.
