= Greenville (community), Wisconsin =

Greenville, Wisconsin
- Unincorporated community
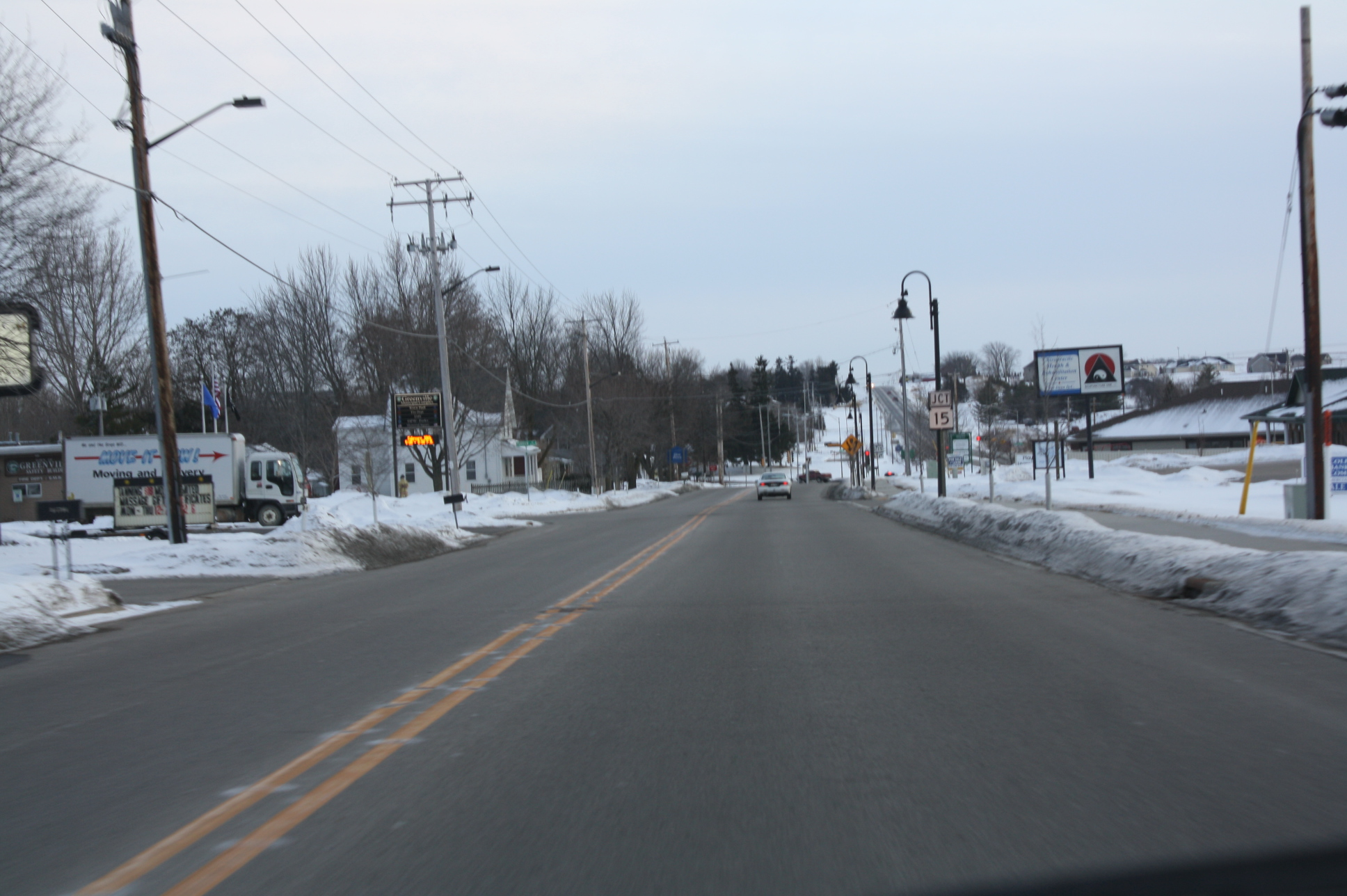
- Looking south at Greenville

- Location within Wisconsin Location within the United States
- Coordinates: 44°18′01″N 88°32′11″W
- Country: United States
- State: Wisconsin
- County: Outagamie
- Town: Greenville
- Time zone: UTC-6 (Central (CST))
  - Summer (DST): UTC-5 (CDT)
- Area code: 920

Greenville is a former unincorporated community located in the village of Greenville, in Outagamie County, Wisconsin, United States. Greenville is located at the intersection of Wisconsin Highway 76 and Wisconsin Highway 15.

== History ==
The town was founded in 1848 as Greenville Station, and changed its name to Becker in 1879 (named after the first postmaster). Its name was changed to Greenville in 1896. The town and unincorporated community were incorporated into the Village of Greenville in 2021.

== Images ==
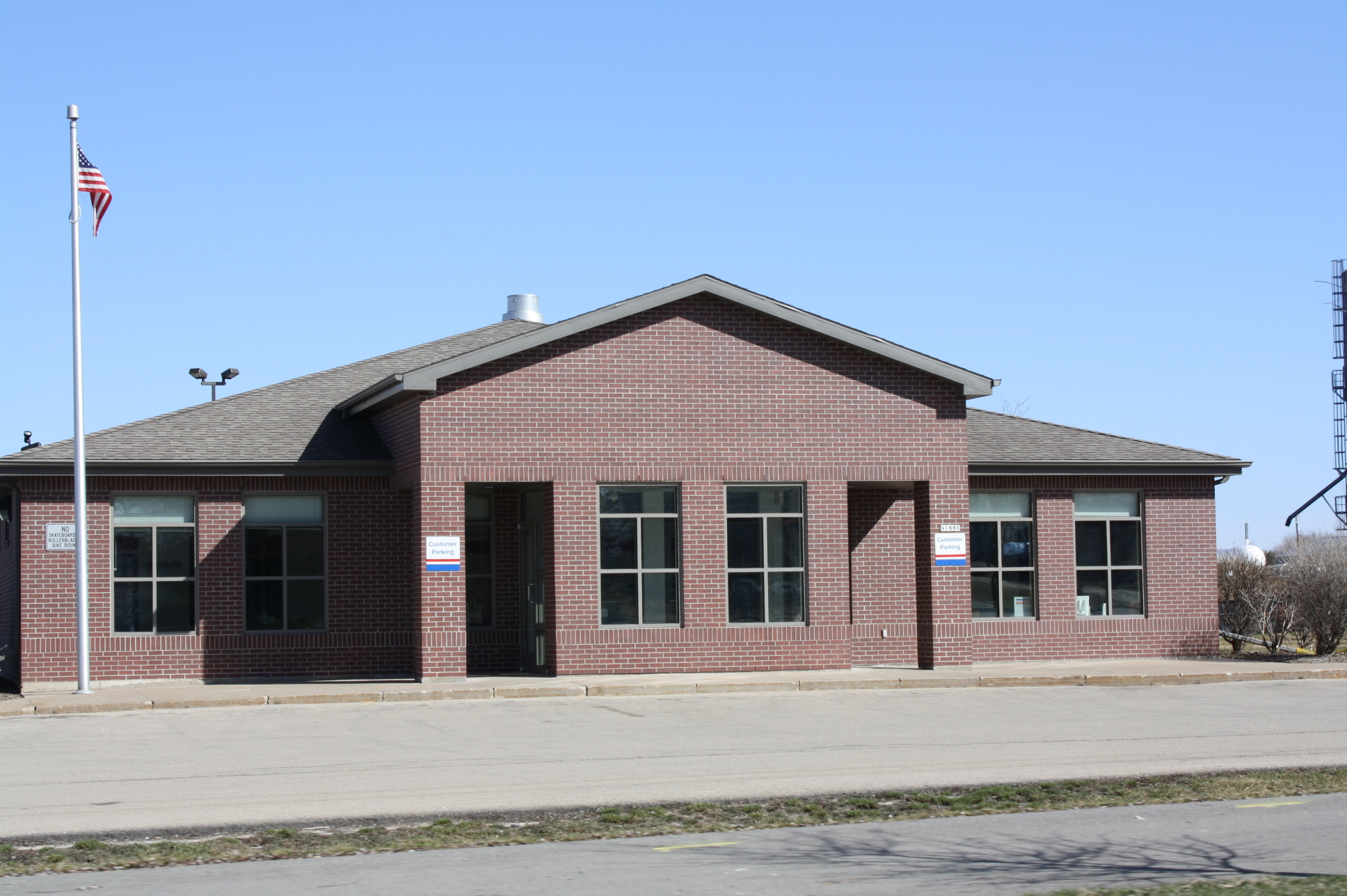
Post office

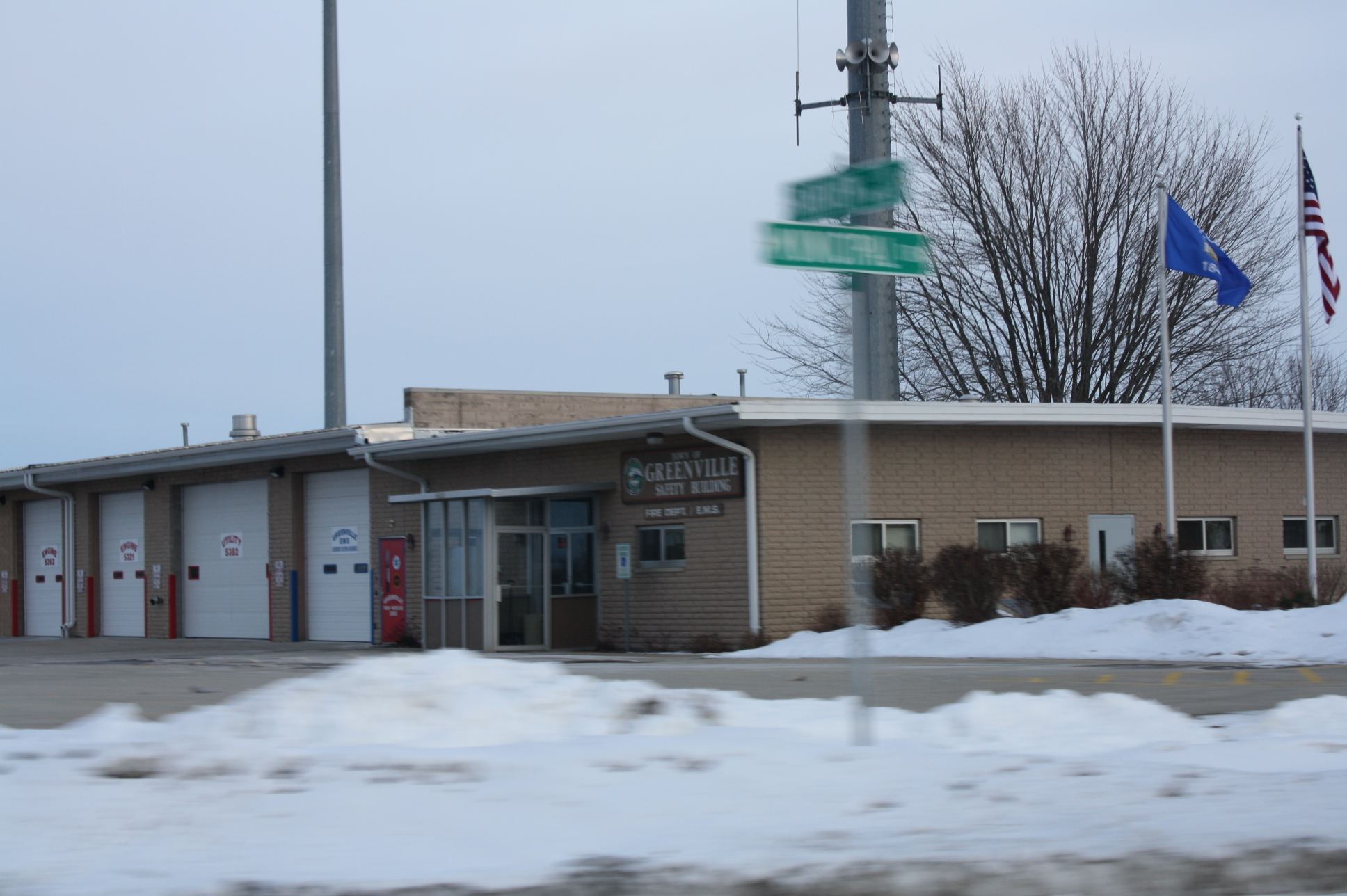
Former fire station, now the Municipal Service Complex

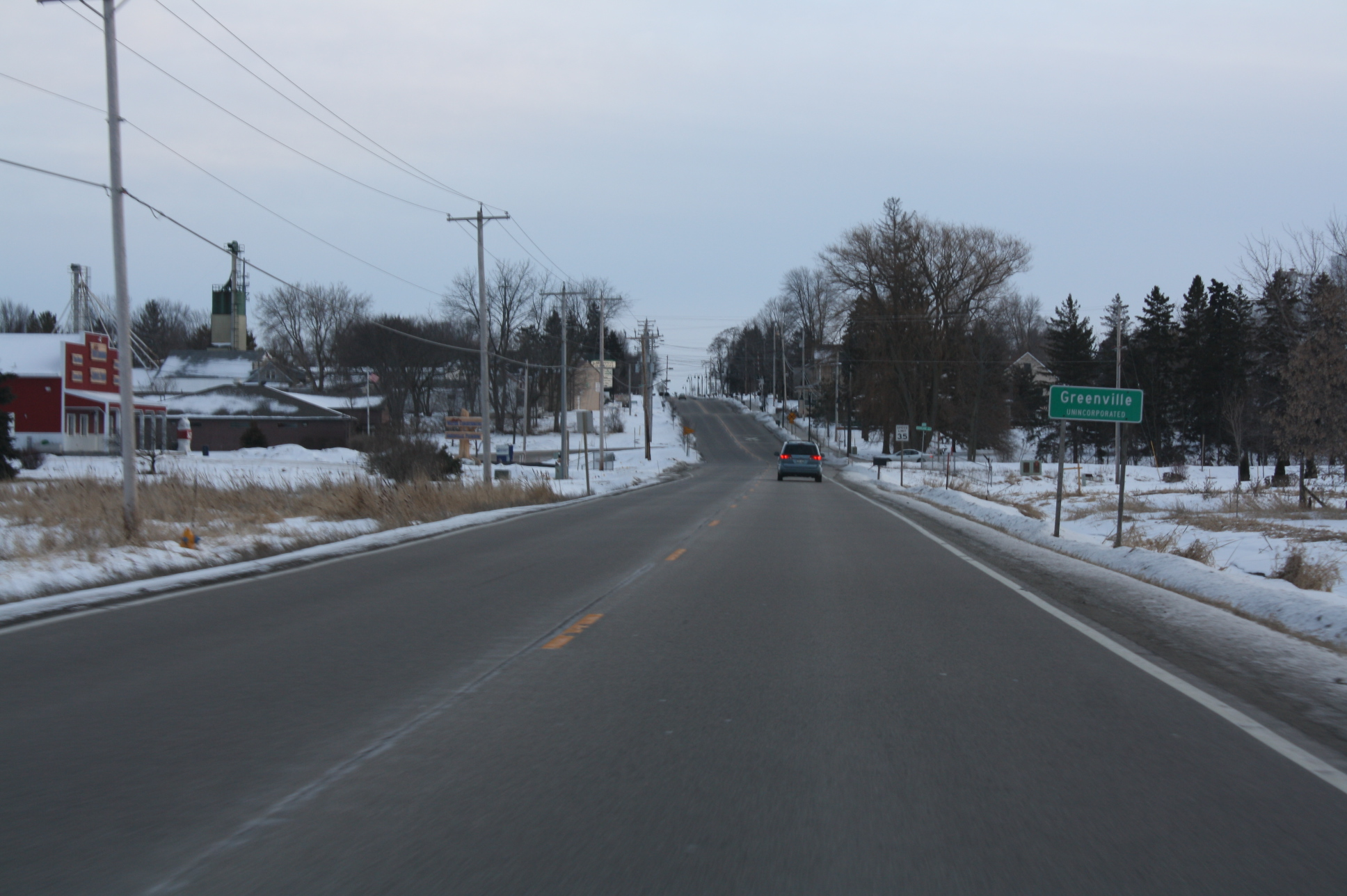
Looking south at the Greenville sign on WIS 76

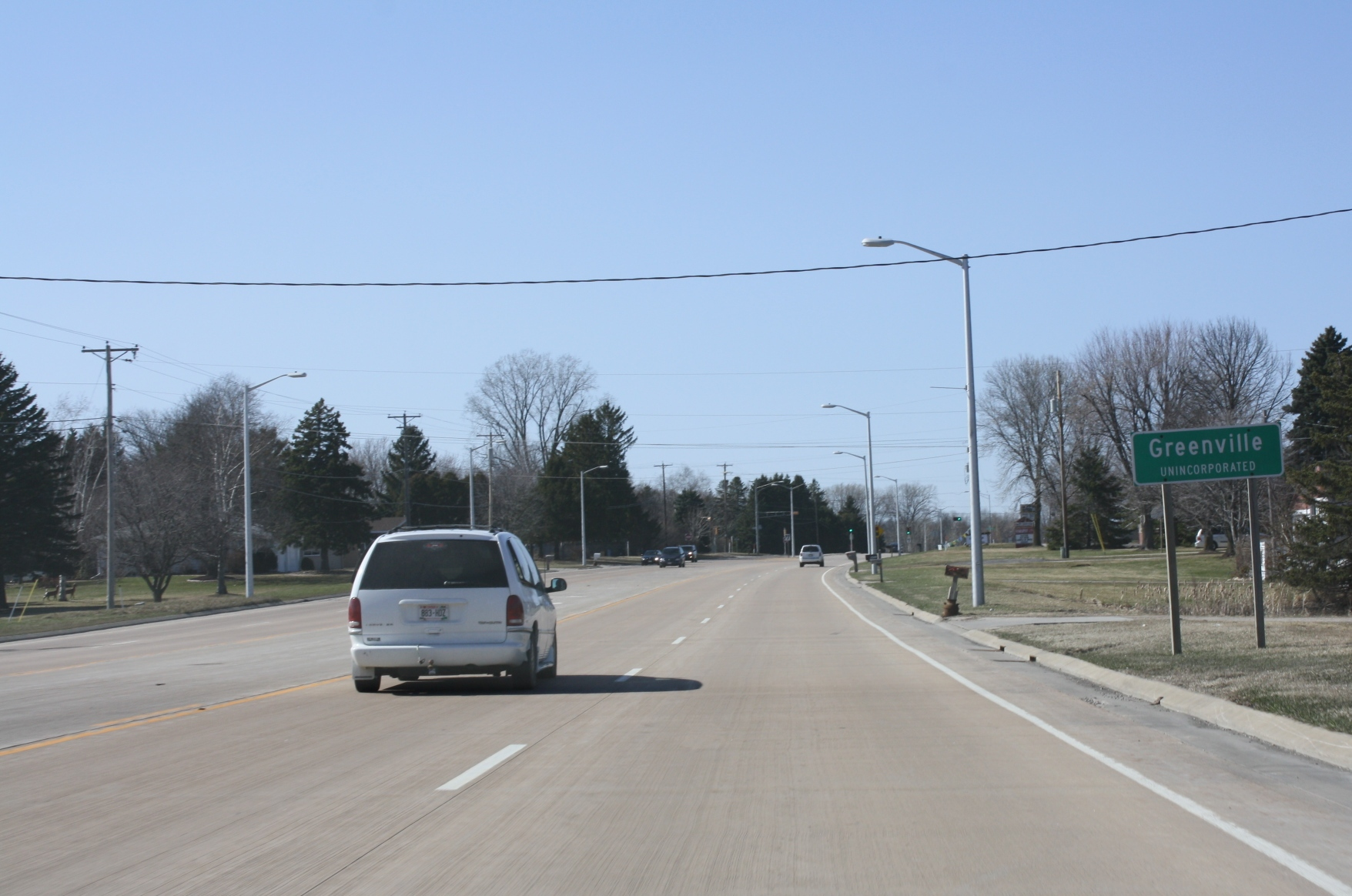
Looking west at the Greenville sign on WIS 15
