= Apple Creek, Wisconsin =

Apple Creek
- unincorporated community
- Location within Wisconsin Location within the United States
- Coordinates: 44°19′32″N 88°22′28″W
- Country: United States
- State: Wisconsin
- County: Outagamie
- Elevation: 781 ft (238 m)
- Time zone: UTC-6 (Central (CST))
  - Summer (DST): UTC-5 (CDT)
- ZIP Codes: 54913 (Appleton)
- Area code: 920
- GNIS ID: 1560902

Apple Creek is an unincorporated community located in the towns of Freedom and Grand Chute in Outagamie County, Wisconsin, United States. It is part of the Appleton, Wisconsin Metropolitan Statistical Area and the Appleton-Oshkosh-Neenah, Wisconsin Combined Statistical Area.

== Transportation ==
Highway EE's northern terminus is Highway U and its southern terminus is WIS 96.
