= Fox Cities Exhibition Center =

Convention center located in Appleton, Wisconsin

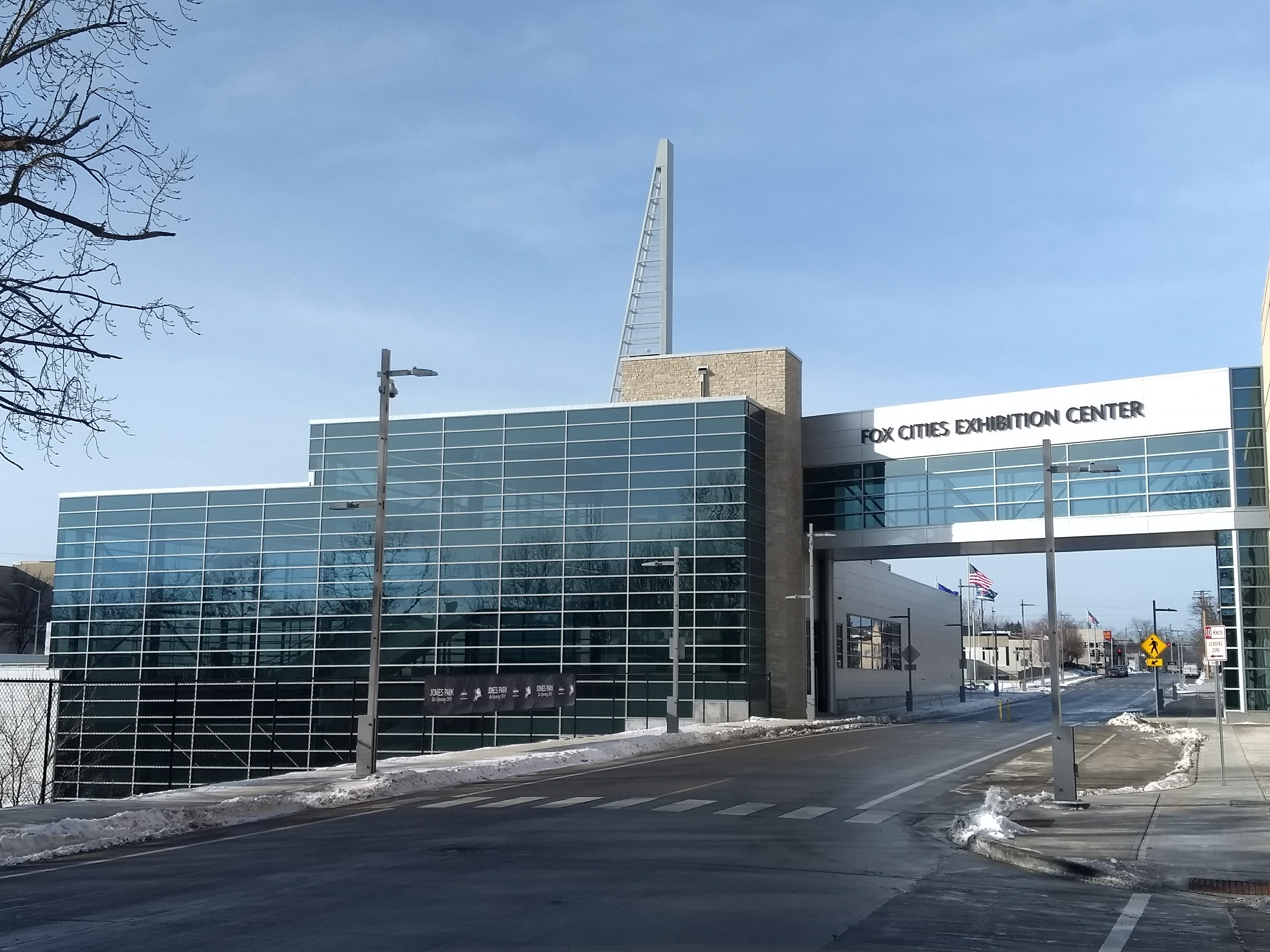
- Center just after opening
- Interactive map of Fox Cities Exhibition Center
- Address: 355 West Lawrence Street; Appleton, WI 54911
- Location: Appleton, Wisconsin
- Coordinates: 44°15′37″N 088°24′35″W
- Owner: City of Appleton
- Operator: Hilton Paper Valley
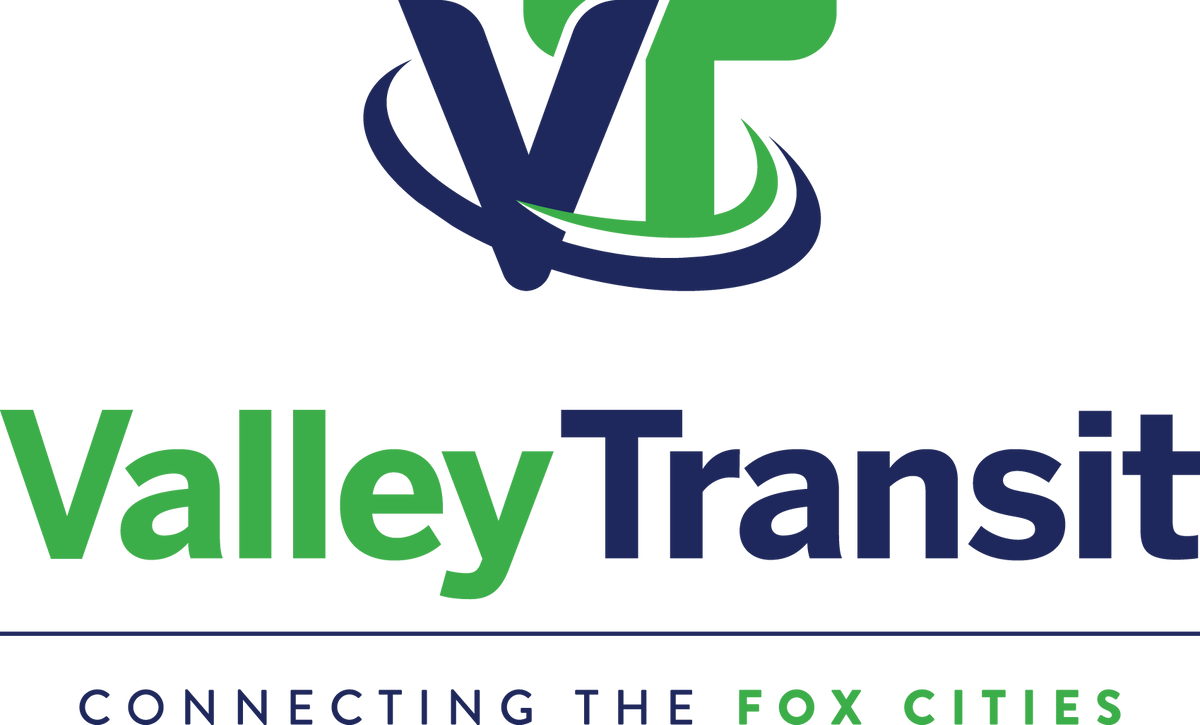
- Public transit

Construction
- Built: 2016-2017
- Construction cost: $31.9 million ($41.9 million in 2025 dollars)

Website
- thefcec.com

The Fox Cities Exhibition Center is a multi-purpose convention center located in the city of Appleton, Wisconsin in the United States. The city of Appleton owns the center and is operated by the connected Hilton Appleton Paper Valley Hotel.

On September 29, 2016, ground was broken on the Fox Cities Exhibition Center. It was finished and inaugurated on January 11, 2018, for an estimated cost of $31.9 million. Funding for the construction of the center is being provided by a 3% hotel-room tax being charged throughout the Fox Cities region. It was designed by Zimmerman Architectural Studios and Miron Construction served as the general contractor.

The center is primarily used for conventions, meetings, trade shows, and community events. The Center welcomed over 60 events upon its first year open, which bypassed the expected events goal, with many more events planned for the future.

== Location ==
The Fox Cities Exhibition Center is located 0.2 miles away from Appleton's city center. It is attached to the Hilton Appleton Paper Valley through a sky-walk, is located next door to the Outagamie County Justice Center, and adjoins Jones Park which has been remodeled to match the convention center and is now open.

== Features ==
The Fox Cities Exhibition Center features 30,000 square feet (2,800 m^{2}) of flexible meeting/convention space across three separate halls which are separated by movable walls which allows the space to be tuned into one large hall. There is also a large 17,000 square feet (1,600 m^{2}) outdoor plaza space. The center is connected to the nearby Hilton Appleton Paper Valley Hotel via a skyway, which contains an additional 40,000 square feet (3,700 m^{2}) of ballroom, banquet, and meeting space.

The center features an 82-foot (25 m)-tall spire lit by light-emitting diodes (LEDs) commemorating 1882 when the first hydroelectric power plant in the world was put into operation on the Fox River in Appleton. The LEDs will be able to be programmed to display different shows for events throughout the year.
