= Fox River Mall =

Shopping mall in Grand Chute, Wisconsin, United States

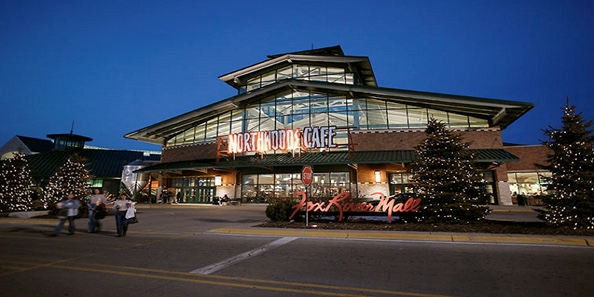
- Main food court entrance
- Location: Grand Chute, Wisconsin
- Coordinates: 44.26899°N 88.47033°W
- Address: 4301 W. Wisconsin Ave., Appleton, WI 54913
- Opened: July 18, 1984; 42 years ago
- Developer: General Growth Properties
- Manager: GGP
- Owner: GGP
- Num. of stores: 135 (As of December 2021)
- Num. of anchor tenants: 6 (4 open, 2 vacant)
- Floor area: 1,183,953 sq ft (109,992.8 m^{2}) (main campus); 1,210,000 sq ft (112,000 m^{2}) (total)
- Floors: 1 with 2nd floor security office (2 in Macy's, closed basement in Scheels All Sports)
- Public transit: Valley Transit; Stop near Target
- Website: www.foxrivermall.com/en.html
- Source: mall website

Fox River Mall is an enclosed super-regional shopping center located in Grand Chute, Wisconsin, United States, which serves the Appleton, Wisconsin metropolitan area. It is a major driver of the local economy and its construction helped spur the growth of the Grand Chute shopping district, which is today known as the "shopping capital of Wisconsin". At 1.21 million square feet, it is one of the largest malls in the state.

The anchor stores are Macy's, JCPenney, Target, and Scheels All Sports. There are 2 vacant anchor stores that were once Sears and Younkers.

== History ==
Before the mall was built, the Appleton Metropolitan area was considered to be the only major metropolitan area in the United States that did not have a major regional mall to strengthen its economy. Local business leaders got together and encouraged a developer to build a mall. At this time the west side of Interstate 41 was largely undeveloped, making it the perfect place to build the mall. Since its opening, this region has been greatly developed and brings many visitors and businesses to the Appleton Metropolitan area. Today it contributes about 1 billion dollars annually to the local economy.

The mall opened on July 18, 1984, with one anchor store, Sears, along with 67 other stores, a movie theater, and a Walgreens drugstore. Expanded several times in its history, including in 1991 when Dayton's built a new location, which eventually became Marshall Field's, and is now Macy's. With the last major renovation occurring in 2004, it became the largest mall in Wisconsin in 2014, with 1.2 million square feet.

In May 2018, the mall's Younkers location closed. It had been an anchor tenant for 26 years.

On December 28, 2018, it was announced that Sears would be closing as part of a plan to close 80 stores nationwide. The store closed on March 17, 2019.

== Facilities ==
The Fox River Mall is located on approximately 137 acres (0.55 km^{2}) of land. It is the largest shopping mall in Wisconsin, with over 140 stores. It has a food court called the Northwoods Café, which includes more than a dozen counter vendors. Fox River Plaza is a strip mall on the premises.

The main campus has a total retail area of 1,183,953 sq ft (109,992.8 m^{2}). Some stores and restaurants are located in separate outbuildings off the main campus, making for a total retail area of 1,210,000 sq ft (112,000 m^{2}).

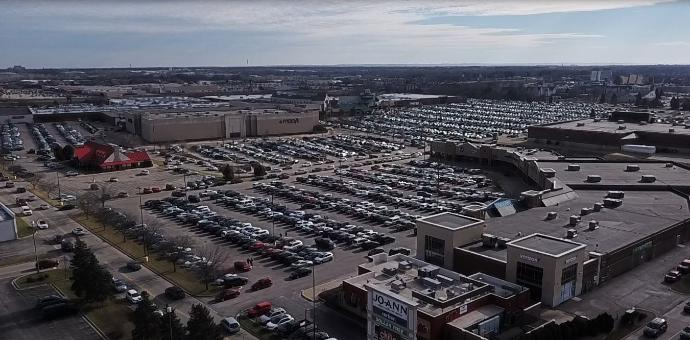
Traffic on Black Friday

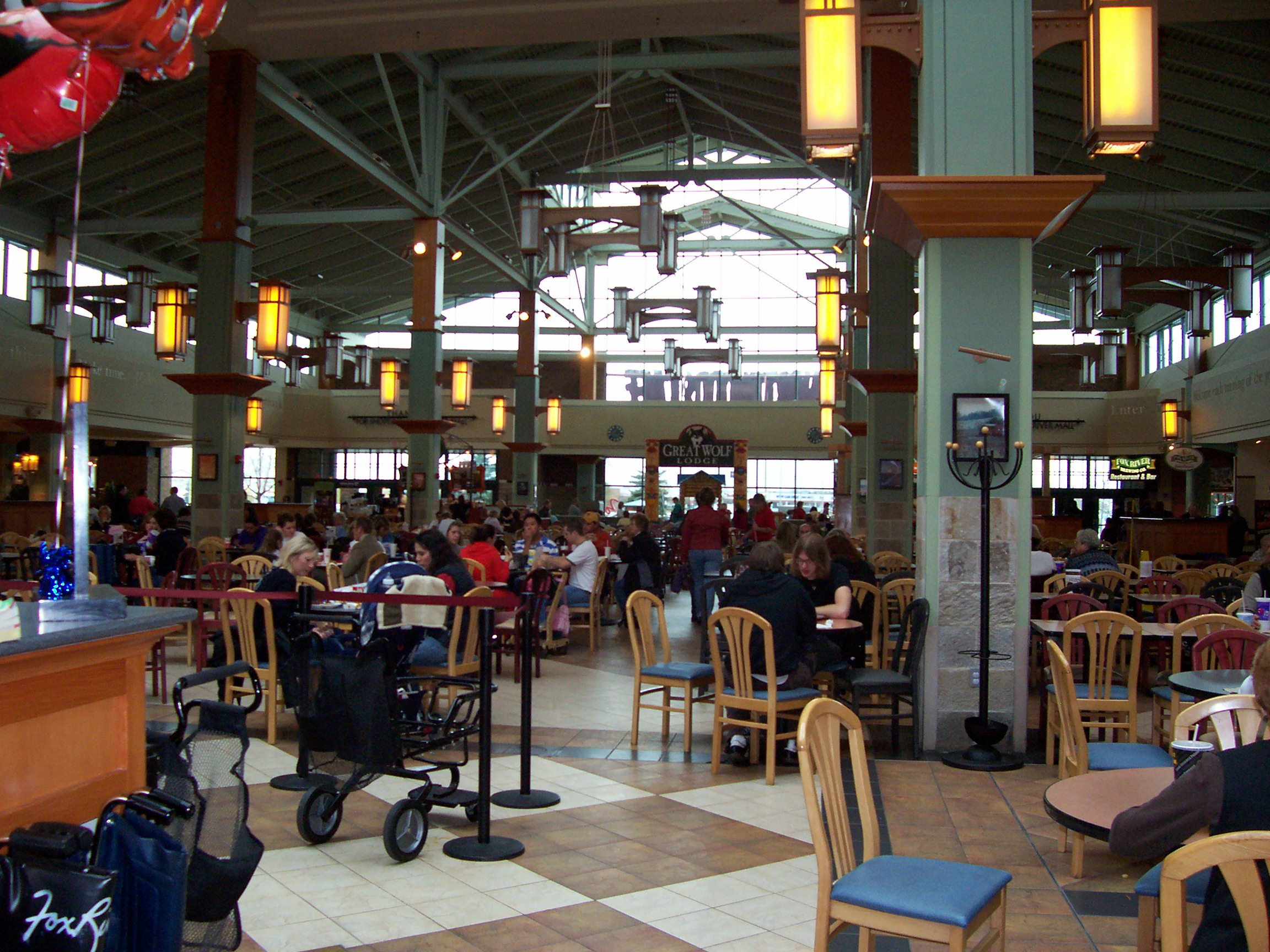
The "Northwoods Cafe" food court

Fox River Mall is owned by Brookfield Properties.
