= Hortonia, Wisconsin =

- Town
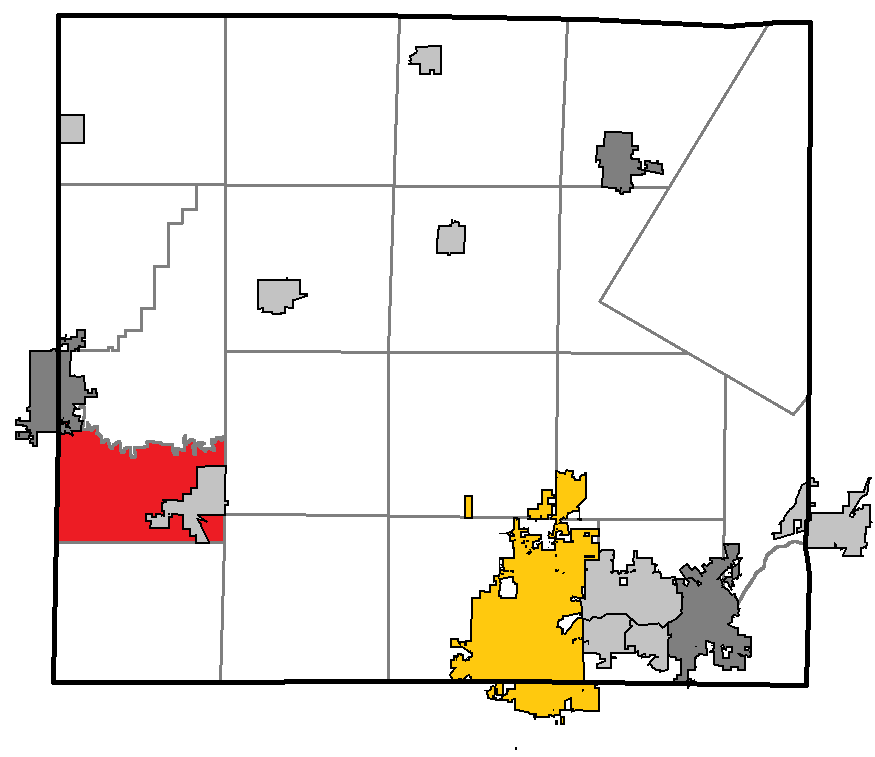
- Location of Hortonia, within Outagamie County
- Coordinates: 44°21′35″N 88°41′50″W
- Country: United States
- State: Wisconsin
- County: Outagamie

Area
  - Total: 19.4 sq mi (50.3 km^{2})
  - Land: 19.2 sq mi (49.7 km^{2})
  - Water: 0.23 sq mi (0.6 km^{2})
- Elevation: 840 ft (256 m)

Population (2020)
  - Total: 1,052
  - Density: 54.8/sq mi (21.2/km^{2})
- Time zone: UTC-6 (Central (CST))
  - Summer (DST): UTC-5 (CDT)
- FIPS code: 55-35825
- GNIS feature ID: 1583410
- Website: http://www.townofhortonia.org

Hortonia is a town in Outagamie County, Wisconsin, United States. The population was around 1,052 in the 2020 census.

== Geography ==
According to the United States Census Bureau, the town has a total area of 19.4 square miles (50.3 km^{2}), of which 19.2 square miles (49.7 km^{2}) is land and 0.2 square mile (0.6 km^{2}) (1.18%) is water.

== Demographics ==
As of the census of 2020, there were 1,052 people, 383 households, and 317 families residing in the town. The population density was 54.2 people per square mile (20.9/km^{2}). There were 434 housing units at an average density of 22.4 per square mile (8.6/km^{2}).

As of the 2023 ACS 5-year estimate demographic profile, the racial makeup of the town was estimated to be 99.5% White, 0.3% Native American, 1.5% Asian, 1.4% from other races, and 2.7% from two or more races. Hispanic or Latino of any race were 1.4% of the population.

As of the 2010 Census, There were 362 households, out of which 38.4% had children under the age of 18 living with them, 76.2% were married couples living together, 3.3% had a female householder with no husband present, and 18.0% were non-families. 14.6% of all households were made up of individuals, and 5.8% had someone living alone who was 65 years of age or older. The average household size was 2.83 and the average family size was 3.13.

In the town, the population was spread out, with 27.3% under the age of 18, 6.0% from 18 to 24, 32.6% from 25 to 44, 25.2% from 45 to 64, and 8.8% who were 65 years of age or older. The median age was 37 years. For every 100 females, there were 103.3 males. For every 100 females age 18 and over, there were 103.4 males.

The median income for a household in the town was $59,904, and the median income for a family was $66,705. Males had a median income of $46,307 versus $25,938 for females. The per capita income for the town was $29,573. About 1.4% of families and 6.4% of the population were below the poverty line, including 3.1% of those under age 18 and 5.7% of those age 65 or over.
