= Appleton International Airport =

International airport serving the Fox Cities and Appleton, Wisconsin, USA

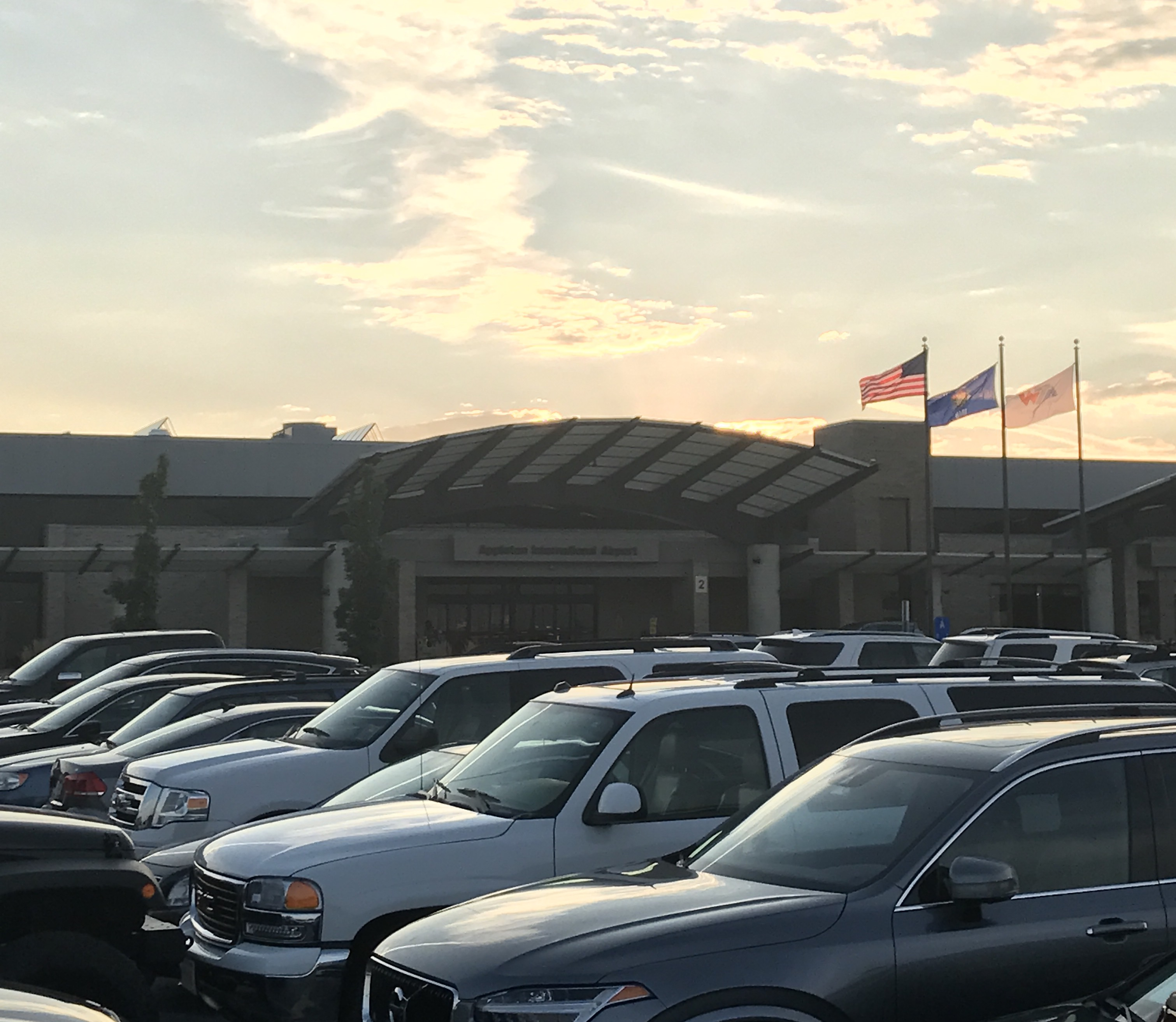
- IATA: ATW; ICAO: KATW; FAA LID: ATW

Summary
- Airport type: Public
- Owner/Operator: Outagamie County
- Serves: Appleton, Wisconsin/Fox Cities
- Location: Greenville, Wisconsin
- Opened: August 22, 1965; 61 years ago
- Operating base for: Allegiant Air
- Time zone: CST (UTC−06:00)
  - Summer (DST): CDT (UTC−05:00)
- Elevation AMSL: 918 ft (280 m)
- Coordinates: 44°15′29″N 088°31′09″W
- Website: ATWairport.com

Maps
- FAA airport diagram

- Location of airport in Wisconsin ATW (the United States)
- Interactive map of Appleton International Airport

Runways
Direction	Length		Surface
Direction	ft	m	Surface
03/21	8,003	2,439	Concrete
12/30	6,502	1,982	Concrete

Statistics (12 months ending August 2026 ^{except where noted})
- Passenger volume: 1,349,000
- Departing passengers: 677,000
- Scheduled flights: 9,247
- Cargo (lb.): 12 mil
- Aircraft operations (2022): 49,384
- Based aircraft (2024): 74
- Source: Federal Aviation Administration, BTS

Appleton International Airport (IATA: ATW, ICAO: KATW, FAA LID: ATW), formerly Outagamie County Regional Airport, is an airport located in Greenville, Wisconsin, United States, 3 nautical miles (5.6 km; 3.5 mi) west of Appleton. It is included in the Federal Aviation Administration (FAA) National Plan of Integrated Airport Systems for 2025–2029. Along with Madison’s Dane County Regional Airport, it is one of two airports in the State of Wisconsin categorized as a small hub. The airport covers 1,638 acres (6.63 km^{2}) at an elevation of 918 feet (280 m) above sea level.

It is the third busiest of eight commercial airports in Wisconsin in terms of passengers served. In 2016 the airport contributed $676 million to the Northeastern Wisconsin economy. In May 2018, Appleton International Airport was the fourth fastest growing airport in the US. It is the main base of privately owned regional airline Air Wisconsin and was the original home of Midwest Airlines. Midwest Airlines grew out of Kimberly-Clark subsidiary K-C Aviation, which was sold in 1998 to Gulfstream Aerospace, which retains a major facility at the airport, focusing on maintenance, interior completions, and exterior painting for the company's G600, G650, and G700 products.

== History ==
The airport opened with the 5,200-foot (1,580 m) runway 12/30 in 1965.

In the 1920s, Appleton's airport was George A. Whiting Field.

Construction of the current facility began in 1963; the field was dedicated on August 22, 1965, along with Air Wisconsin, which started operations out of the airport the next day.

=== Recent years ===
Since 2009, the airport has been completing a number of renovation projects under a PFC plan. Parts of the project already completed include rehabilitating runway 12/30 and taxiway B as well as expanding taxiway N and installing runway guard lights throughout the field. In January 2017, a new rental car facility opened across from the terminal building.

In December 2017, the airport started a project to remodel the terminal with the addition of meeting space, a brand new restaurant with airfield views, remodeled/expanded security area, and remodeled check-in area.

Furthermore the airport is currently studying the construction of adding additional gates either through expanding the airport's current concourse or building a second concourse.

In 2011, the airport was one of ten nationwide airports selected to participate in an FAA airport sustainability project with a goal to make the airport 70% more energy efficient by 2030. In 2017, the airport constructed solar carports (covered parking structure with solar panels on the roof) in the short-term parking lot. Additional solar carports were constructed and completed in October 2019. The solar carports supplement a system of solar panels installed on the roof of the terminal building which were installed in the early 2010s.

The Appleton Flight Center Terminal, which was constructed in 2013, is a LEED-certified facility and features zero VOC finishes, a roof-mounted 26 kW photovoltaic system, a ground source heat pump, in-floor radiant conditioning, and a rainwater collection system. The terminal was the nation’s first airport terminal to achieve a net zero energy designation, receiving a Class D Net Zero Energy Building rating and is widely considered to be a leader in airport energy sustainability.

The Outagamie County Board rejected a proposal in 1983 to change the name to "Fox Cities Metro Airport," and three more name change efforts failed between 2003 and 2011. In February 2014, the county board voted to rename the airport "Appleton International Airport." The new name was officially implemented in 2015 on August 21, during the golden anniversary celebration of the airport.

Since the late 2010s, the airport has seen a period of mass growth. In May 2018 a report by Bloomberg News revealed that Appleton International Airport was the fourth fastest-growing airport in the US, with a 26.8% increase in passengers compared to two years prior. In 2022, the airport handled just under 830,000 passengers, the most in its history. In March 2024, the airport handled 100,800 passengers, its busiest month to date.

On August 10, 2021, Allegiant Air announced that they would base Airbus A320 aircraft at the airport beginning March 2, 2022. They will also open a crew/maintenance base to support these aircraft.

In November 2023, the airport began work on a major multi-phase expansion of the terminal that nearly doubled the size of the terminal. The project added six new gates (while eliminating three of seven existing gates). There is room for two additional jet bridges if needed in the future. The new gates are designed to accommodate Embraer E-Jet, Boeing 737, or Airbus A320 family aircraft. The check-in/ticketing hall and passenger loading areas will also be expanded as well as the addition of a new international arrivals building will occur in later phases. The $66 million project is expected to be completed in the spring of 2025.

In August 2024, there were 74 aircraft based at this airport: 50 single-engine, 17 multi-engine and 7 jets.

== Facilities ==
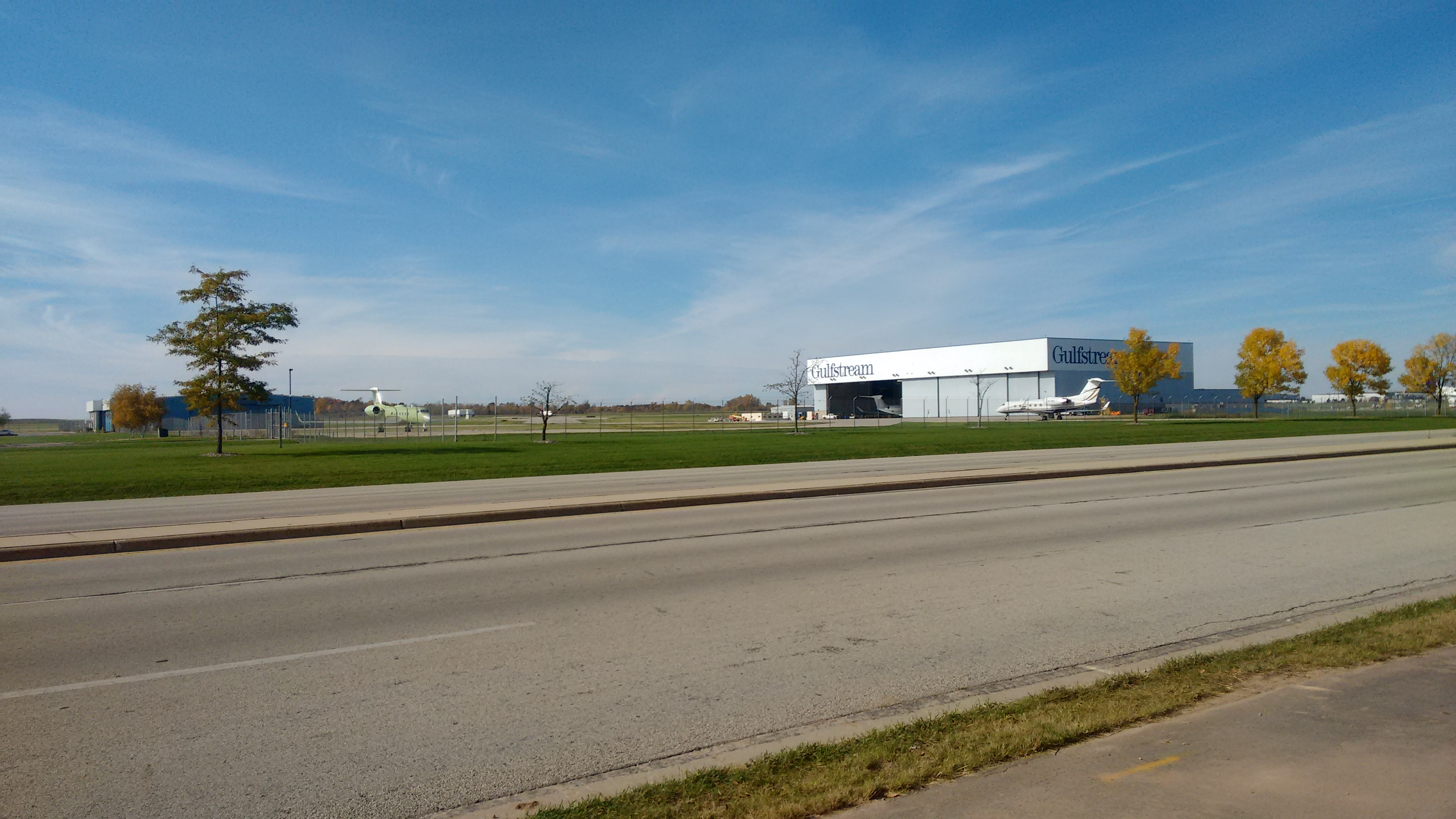
Main Gulfstream ramp at airport

=== Runways ===
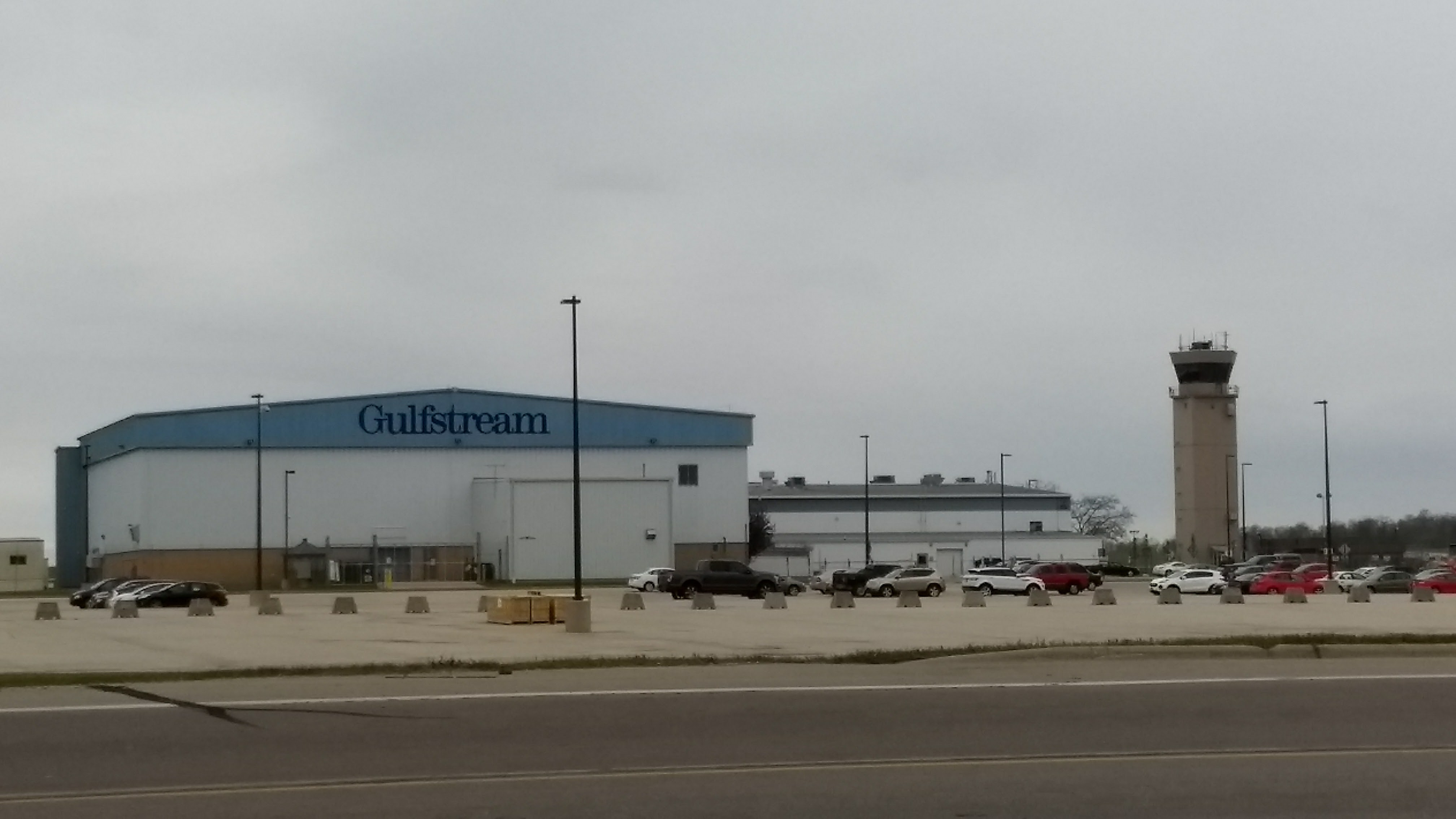
Tower and Gulfstream hangar

Appleton International Airport has 2 runways that are perpendicular to one another forming an X shape.

Runways at ATW
Runway	Length / width	Runway	Surface	Notes
3 →	8,003 by 150 ft 2,439 by 46 m	← 21	Concrete	Runway 3/21 is equipped with high intensity runway edge lighting. Both equipped with a PAPI system. RWY 3 has an ILS/DME Cat 1 Approach; Both have certified GPS approaches capable of LPV precision allowing for approaches similar to an ILS.
12 →	6,502 by 150 ft 1,982 by 46 m	← 30	Concrete	Runway 12/30 is equipped with high intensity runway edge lighting. Both equipped with a PAPI system. RWY 30 has a ILS/DME Cat 1 Approach : Both have certified GPS approaches capable of LPV precision.

=== Terminal ===
The terminal was built in 1974, with the first several expansions in 1983, 1990, and 1998.

The airport added a new ground-level seven-gate concourse in 2000 and renovated the existing passenger terminal, which was designed by architect Paul W. Powers. The architectural theme was representative of the river flowing through the historic paper manufacturing region.

The terminal next underwent an extensive renovation and expansion in 2001. The new 30,000-square-foot (2,800 m^{2}) gate area included more spacious seating areas with natural lighting, in floor heating, new passenger paging system, and five aircraft boarding bridges; a 6th and 7th bridge for larger planes was added later. It cost $10.7 million and was designed by Mead & Hunt, Inc.

The airport's main entrance at CTH CA features a complete reproduction of the Apollo 11 statue located in the Moon Tree Garden of the Kennedy Space Center Visitor Complex. It was donated to the airport in 2020 by local car salesmen giant John Bergstrom.

In November 2023, the airport began work on a major multi-phase expansion of the terminal that nearly doubled the size of the terminal and added second-level boarding positions. This most-recent addition brought the current gate and jet bridge count to ten, with room for an additional two jet bridges at the end of the concourse addition, that can be added later if needed.

=== Ground transportation ===
Appleton International Airport is located 2 miles (3.2 km) west of Interstate 41 and 3 miles (4.8 km) north of US Highway 10.

Valley Transit bus service does not have a stop servicing the airport, but there are stops nearby.

Vehicle for hire companies including Uber, Lyft, and taxicabs are allowed to pick up and drop off passengers on airport property.

Six car rental companies offer service at the airport out of a consolidated rental car facility across from the terminal.

=== Other ===
The airport has an FBO, Appleton Flight Center, which offers AvGas and jet fuel, as well as a number of other resources such as a crew car and WiFi.

ATW holds the Old Glory Honor Flights for the Northeast Wisconsin area. These flights bring veterans from World War II and the Korean War to see their memorials in Washington. The airport has hosted many community events to raise money for these flights, including a plane pull event in September 2017. The flights are flown by Sun Country Airlines.

The airport, along with Allegiant Air, hosts a bi-annual event called "Wings for Autism". The event allows children on the autism spectrum, along with their parents, to go through a rehearsal flight in which they practice checking in for their flight, going through airport security, boarding their flight, and collecting checked baggage. The event is sponsored by many local organizations and companies. It is one of the largest versions of the event held nationally.

Every April, the airport celebrates autism awareness month by lighting the terminal blue.

The airport is home to the Fox Cities Composite Squadron of the Civil Air Patrol, which houses a fleet of Cessna 182s at the airport.

== Airlines and destinations ==
=== Passenger ===
Airlines	Destinations
Allegiant Air	Fort Lauderdale, Fort Myers, Gulf Shores, Las Vegas, Nashville, Orange County, Orlando, Orlando/Sanford, Phoenix/Mesa, Punta Gorda (FL), Sarasota, St. Petersburg/Clearwater; Seasonal: Savannah
American Eagle	Charlotte, Chicago–O'Hare, Dallas/Fort Worth
Delta Air Lines	Atlanta
Delta Connection	Detroit, Minneapolis/St. Paul; Seasonal: Atlanta
United Airlines	Denver
United Express	Chicago–O'Hare

Destinations map
All passenger destinations from Appleton International Airport (ATW)
Red = Year-round destination
Green = Seasonal destination
Blue = Future destination
Purple = Route ending

== Statistics ==
=== Carrier shares ===
Carrier shares (September 2025 – August 2026)
Carrier	Passengers (arriving and departing)
Allegiant	536,000(39.74%)
SkyWest Airlines	344,000(25.48%)
Envoy Air	188,000(13.91%)
Delta	98,670(7.31%)
GoJet	89,180(6.61%)
Other	93,730(6.95%)

=== Top destinations ===
Busiest domestic routes from ATW (September 2025 – August 2026)
Rank	Airport	Passengers	Carriers
1	Chicago–O'Hare, Illinois	144,690	American, United
2	Minneapolis/St. Paul, Minnesota	65,590	Delta
3	Detroit, Michigan	64,450	Delta
4	Atlanta, Georgia	45,290	Delta
5	Orlando–Sanford, Florida	41,300	Allegiant
6	Phoenix–Mesa, Arizona	40,850	Allegiant
7	Punta Gorda, Florida	37,610	Allegiant
8	Denver, Colorado	37,060	Allegiant, United
9	Dallas/Fort Worth, Texas	29,570	American
10	Clearwater, Florida	29,030	Allegiant

=== Annual traffic ===
Appleton Airport passengers served 2015–2025 (hundred thousands)

For the twelve-month period ending December 31, 2022, the airport had 49,384 aircraft operations, an average of 135 per day: 65% general aviation, 20% air taxi, 15% commercial airline and less than 1% military.

== Accidents and incidents ==
- On June 29, 1972, Air Wisconsin Flight 671, a DHC-6 Twin Otter, collided with North Central Airlines Flight 290 over Lake Winnebago while on approach to the airport; both planes crashed into the lake and sank, resulting in 13 fatalities.

== See also ==
- List of airports in Wisconsin
- Valley Transit
