= William LaMure =

19th century American politician

Member of the Wisconsin State Assembly from the Calumet–Outagamie 3rd district
- In office January 5, 1885 – January 7, 1889
- Preceded by: James Lennon
- Succeeded by: District abolished

Personal details
- Born: October 22, 1829 Green Bay, Michigan Territory
- Died: April 5, 1915 (aged 85) Kaukauna, Wisconsin, U.S.
- Resting place: Holy Angels Cemetery, Appleton
- Party: Democratic
- Spouse: Louisa Porlier (m. 1852)
- Children: Jennie M. A. (De Camp)^{(b. 1855, died 1888)}; Harriette (Farrell)^{(b. 1863; died 1910)}; John James LaMure^{(b. 1865, died 1897)}; George W. LaMure^{(b. 1867, died 1869)}; Eugenie A. J. LaMure^{(b. 1869, died 1891)}; Charles W. LaMure^{(b. 1875, died 1906)}; Joseph LaMure; William LaMure; Mrs. August Kowalke; Mrs. Charles E. Stevens; Mrs. Martin Speel
- Occupation: Farmer, livestock trader

William J. LaMure (October 22, 1829 – April 5, 1915) was an American farmer, cattle dealer, and Wisconsin pioneer. He was a member of the Wisconsin State Assembly, representing southern Outagamie County and northern Calumet County during the 1885 and 1887 sessions. With his parents, he was one of the earliest settlers at the town of Buchanan, Wisconsin.

== Biography ==
William LaMure was born on October 22, 1829, in what is now Green Bay, Wisconsin. His parents were early settlers in what was then the western part of the Michigan Territory. At about age 10, he moved with his parents to the area that is now the town of Buchanan, Wisconsin, where there were just two settlers then living. He attended the frontier schools at Green Bay and, after moving south, at the settlement at Little Chute.

LaMure became active in local politics. He was chairman of the town of Buchanan for 25 years and served four years on the county board of supervisors. He also served 35 years as director of the school board and served as treasurer of the school district.

In 1884, he was elected to the Wisconsin State Assembly running on the Democratic Party ticket. He was re-elected in 1886, but his district was abolished in the 1888 redistricting; he did not seek election in his new district. His district had comprised the southeast corner of Outgamie County and the northwest corner of Calumet County. He did run again for Assembly in 1896, but was defeated by Republican Charles Clack.

After leaving office, LaMure relocated his main residence into the nearby city of Kaukauna, Wisconsin. He became an investor and director of the New Holstein Insurance Company, and was president of the Appleton Dairy Board of Trade.

He died at Kaukauna on April 5, 1915.

== Personal life and family ==
William LaMure was the only child of Joseph LaMure and his wife Genevieve "Jennie" (née Derochier) to survive childhood. He married Louisa Porlier on October 5, 1852, whose parents were also early pioneers of Outagamie County. They had at least 11 children, though the parents outlived at least six of their children.

On his death, LaMure's will apparently bequeathed nearly his entire estate to the Darboy Cemetery Association, neglecting his wife and surviving children. The probate court, however, declared the will invalid and disbursed the estate to his survivors.

== Electoral history ==
=== Wisconsin Assembly (1884, 1886) ===
Wisconsin Assembly, Calumet–Outagamie 3rd District Election, 1884
Party	Candidate	Votes	%	±%
General Election, November 8, 1884
Democratic	William LaMure	1,893	66.82%	+19.20%
Republican	Thomas Reese	929	32.79%	
Prohibition	L. Strasser	11	0.39%	−6.86%
Plurality		964	34.03%	+31.55%
Total votes		2,833	100.0%	+80.10%
Democratic hold				

Wisconsin Assembly, Calumet–Outagamie 3rd District Election, 1886
Party	Candidate	Votes	%	±%
General Election, November 2, 1886
Democratic	William LaMure (incumbent)	1,557	61.91%	−4.91%
Republican	F. H. Hayes	935	37.18%	+4.38%
Prohibition	Joseph Rock	23	0.91%	+0.53%
Plurality		622	24.73%	-9.30%
Total votes		2,515	100.0%	-11.22%
Democratic hold				

=== Wisconsin Assembly (1896) ===
Wisconsin Assembly, Outagamie 2nd District Election, 1896
Party	Candidate	Votes	%	±%
General Election, November 3, 1896
Republican	Charles Clack	2,730	55.99%	+3.92%
Democratic	William LaMure	2,082	42.70%	−1.18%
Prohibition	Christ A. Anderson	64	1.31%	−2.74%
Plurality		648	13.29%	+5.09%
Total votes		4,876	100.0%	+21.08%
Republican hold				

Wisconsin State Assembly
Preceded by James Lennon	Member of the Wisconsin State Assembly from the Calumet–Outagamie 3rd district January 5, 1885 – January 7, 1889	District abolished
