= Freedom, Wisconsin =

Freedom is the name of several places in the U.S. state of Wisconsin:

- Freedom, Forest County, Wisconsin, a town
- Freedom, Outagamie County, Wisconsin, the largest town with the name Freedom in Wisconsin
- Freedom (community), Outagamie County, Wisconsin, an unincorporated community
- Freedom, Sauk County, Wisconsin, a town

== See also ==
- Freedom, Wisconsin (film), a 2023 coming of age film
