= Seymour (town), Outagamie County, Wisconsin =

Seymour, Wisconsin Simo (Oneida)
- Town
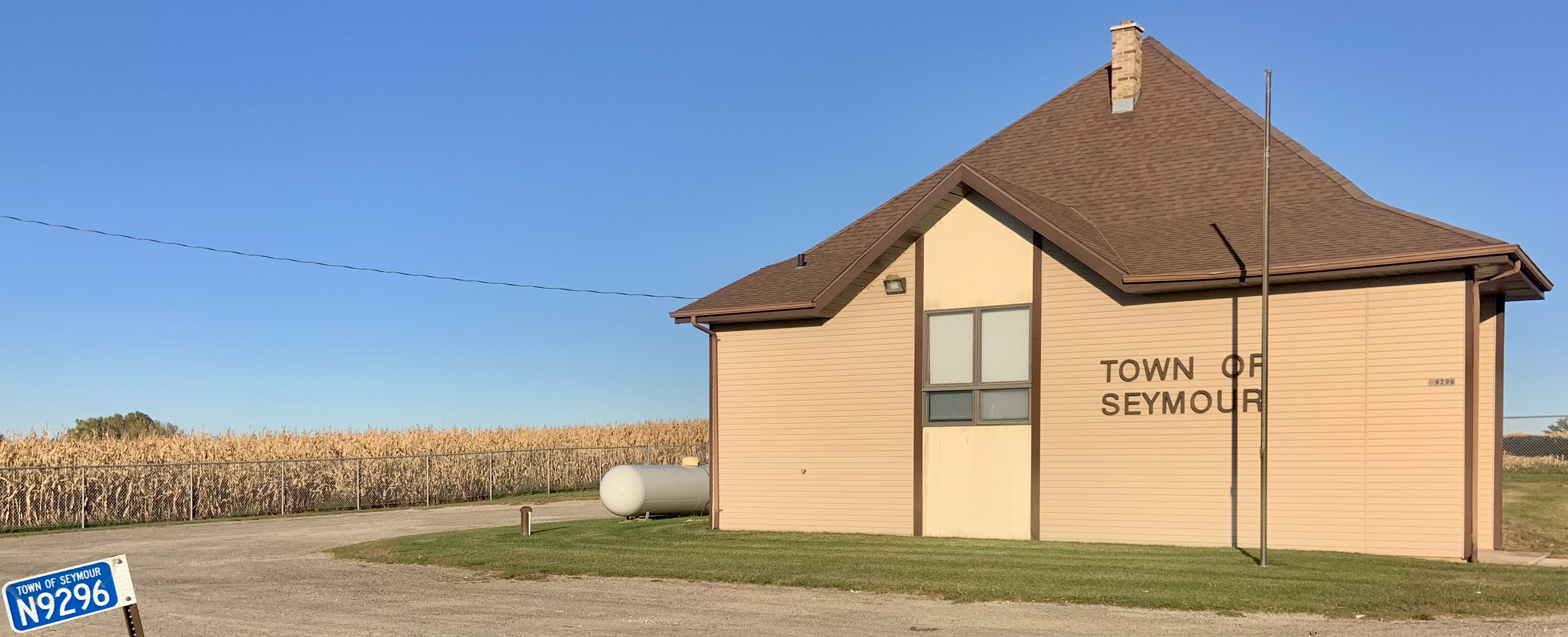
- Seymour Town Hall

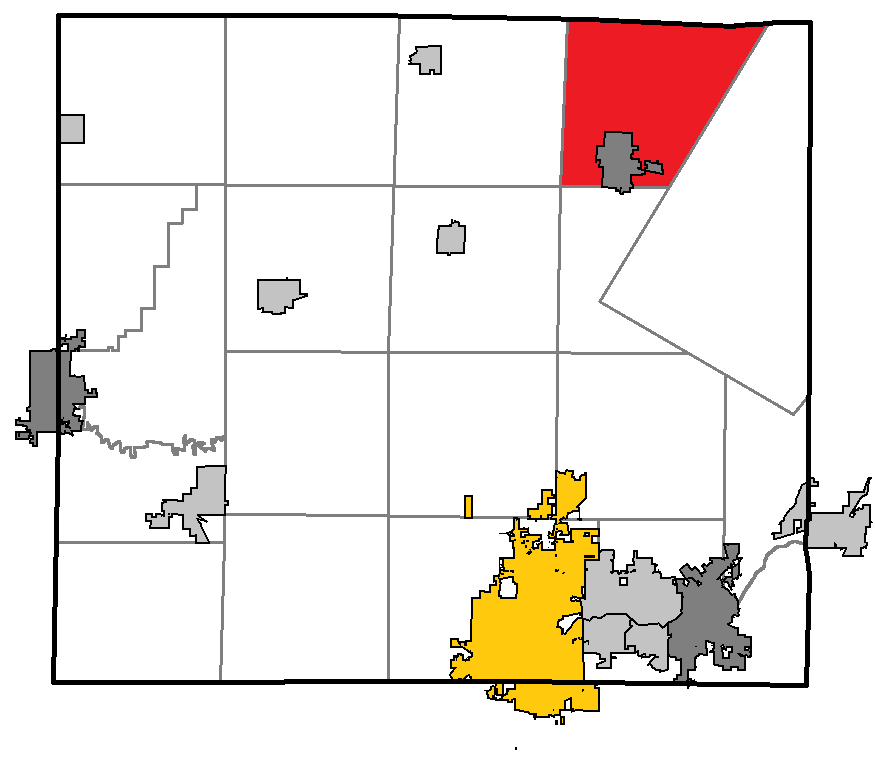
- Location of Seymour, within Outagamie County
- Coordinates: 44°32′37″N 88°18′49″W
- Country: United States
- State: Wisconsin
- County: Outagamie

Area
  - Total: 30.5 sq mi (79.0 km^{2})
  - Land: 30.5 sq mi (79.0 km^{2})
  - Water: 0 sq mi (0.0 km^{2})
- Elevation: 810 ft (247 m)

Population (2020)
  - Total: 1,191
  - Density: 39.0/sq mi (15.1/km^{2})
- Time zone: UTC-6 (Central (CST))
  - Summer (DST): UTC-5 (CDT)
- Area code: 920
- FIPS code: 55-72750
- GNIS feature ID: 1584130
- Website: https://townofseymour-outagamie.com/

There are other populated places named Seymour in Wisconsin.

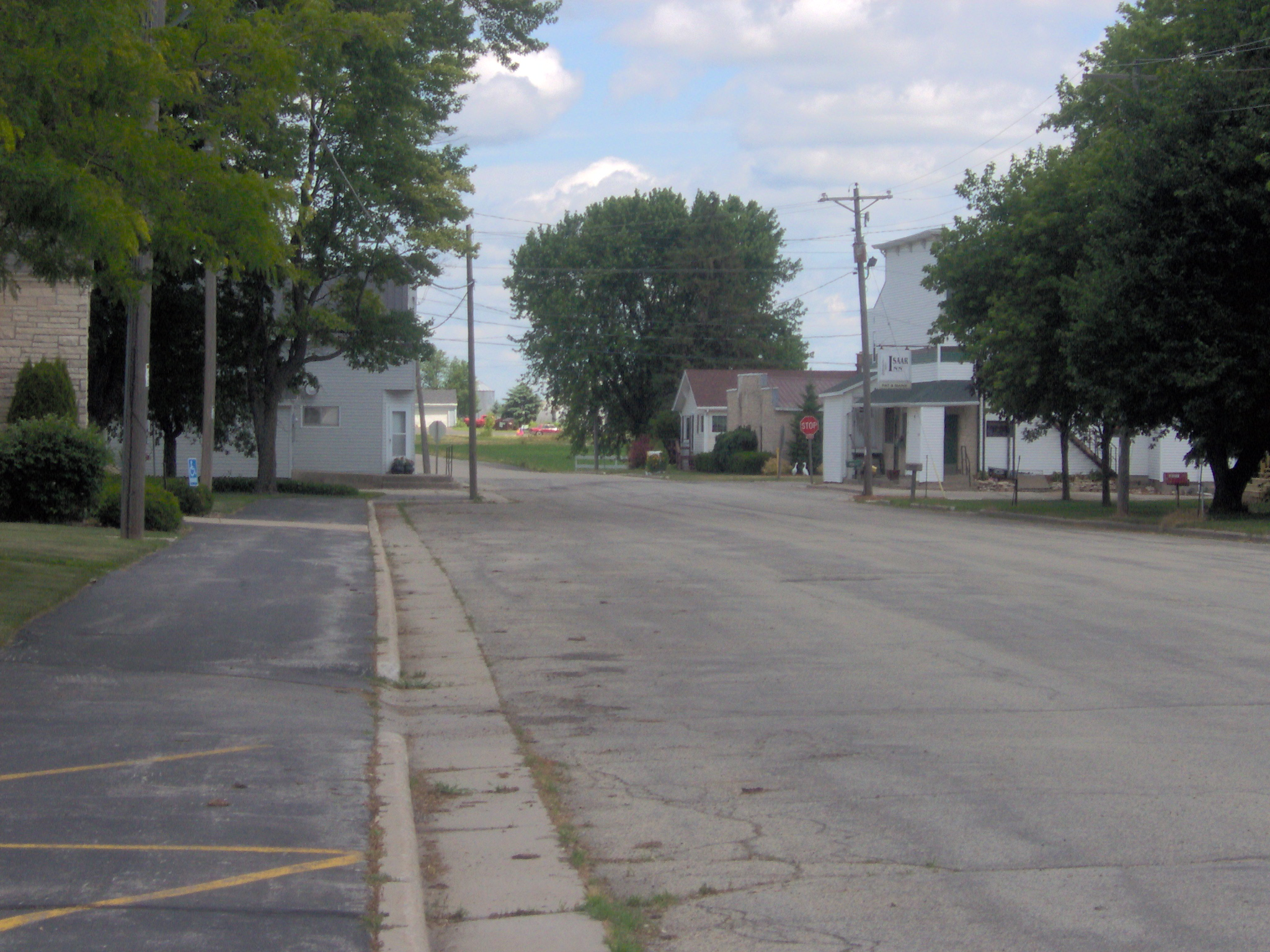
Isaar area

Seymour is a town in Outagamie County, Wisconsin, United States. The population was 1,191 at the 2020 census. The City of Seymour is located within the town. The unincorporated community of Isaar is also located in the town. The ghost town of Lime Rock was also located partially in the town.

== Geography ==
According to the United States Census Bureau, the town has a total area of 30.5 square miles (79.0 km^{2}), of which 30.5 square miles (79.0 km^{2}) is land and 0.0 square mile (0.0 km^{2}) (0.03%) is water.

== Demographics ==
As of the census of 2000, there were 1,216 people, 406 households, and 347 families residing in the town. The population density was 39.9 people per square mile (15.4/km^{2}). There were 421 housing units at an average density of 5.3 persons/km^{2} (13.8 persons/sq mi). The racial makeup of the town was 96.13% White, 0.08% African American, 2.30% Native American, 0.08% Asian, 0.00% Pacific Islander, 0.41% from other races, and 0.99% from two or more races. 1.40% of the population were Hispanic or Latino of any race.

There were 406 households, out of which 42.4% had children under the age of 18 living with them, 76.6% were married couples living together, 5.9% have a woman whose husband does not live with her, and 14.3% were non-families. 11.6% of all households were made up of individuals, and 4.9% had someone living alone who was 65 years of age or older. The average household size was 3.00 and the average family size was 3.26.

In the town, the population was spread out, with 30.6% under the age of 18, 6.5% from 18 to 24, 31.3% from 25 to 44, 22.1% from 45 to 64, and 9.5% who were 65 years of age or older. The median age was 35 years. For every 100 females, there were 102.7 males. For every 100 females age 18 and over, there were 100.0 males.

The median income for a household in the town was $48,264, and the median income for a family was $49,861. Males had a median income of $32,500 versus $22,656 for females. The per capita income for the town was $18,327. 3.3% of the population and 2.4% of families were below the poverty line. Out of the total people living in poverty, 3.0% are under the age of 18 and 4.6% are 65 or older.

As of the 2024 American Community Survey, the town has 1,041 residents and 439 households. The population density was 34.4 people per square mile. There were 453 housing units, with 97% occupied and 83% being occupied by the owner. The town has a racial demographic of 93% white, 1% Native American, 2% Asian, 1% Hispanic, and 3% of two or more races.

The median household income in Seymour was $88,224 in 2024, with 9.4% of residents living under the poverty line.

== Transportation ==
WIS 54 Westbound, routes to Black Creek. Eastbound, WIS 54 routes to Green Bay.
WIS 55 Northbound routes to Shawano. Southbound WIS 55 routes to Freedom and Kaukauna.
Highway G's western terminus is WIS 47 and its eastern terminus is Highway Y.
Highway VV's eastern terminus is Highway U and its western terminus is WIS 47.
County Y's northern terminus is WIS 29 and its southern terminus is WIS 54.

== Notable people ==
- Charles F. Ploeger, Wisconsin State Representative, farmer, and businessman, lived in the town; served as chairman of the Seymour Town Board
