= Isaar =

Isaar or ISAAR may refer to:

- Isaar, Wisconsin, an unincorporated community in the USA
- International Standard Archival Authority Record, or ISAAR, a form of authority control record
