= Seymour, Wisconsin =

Seymour, Wisconsin may refer to:

- Seymour (city), Outagamie County, Wisconsin, a city
  - Seymour (town), Outagamie County, Wisconsin, a town
- Seymour, Eau Claire County, Wisconsin, a town
  - Seymour (CDP), Eau Claire County, Wisconsin, a census-designated place in Eau Claire County
- Seymour, Lafayette County, Wisconsin, a town
