= Murphy Corner, Wisconsin =

- Unincorporated community
- Nickname: Skunk Hill
- Location within Wisconsin Location within the United States
- Coordinates: 44°23′11″N 88°20′05″W
- Country: United States
- State: Wisconsin
- County: Outagamie
- Elevation: 810 ft (247 m)
- Time zone: UTC-6 (Central (CST))
  - Summer (DST): UTC-5 (CDT)
- ZIP Codes: 54130, 54913

Murphy Corner is an unincorporated community in the town of Freedom, Outagamie County, Wisconsin, United States.

== Geography ==
Murphy Corner is located at 44°23′11″N 88°20′05″W(44.383333, -88.333333). Its elevation is 811 feet (247m).

== Transportation ==
Highway C northern terminus is WIS 55/WIS 54, its southern terminus is Highway E and its western terminus is WIS 76.
Highway S western terminus is WIS 54 and its eastern terminus is S County Line Rd.
