= Mackville, Wisconsin =

- Unincorporated community
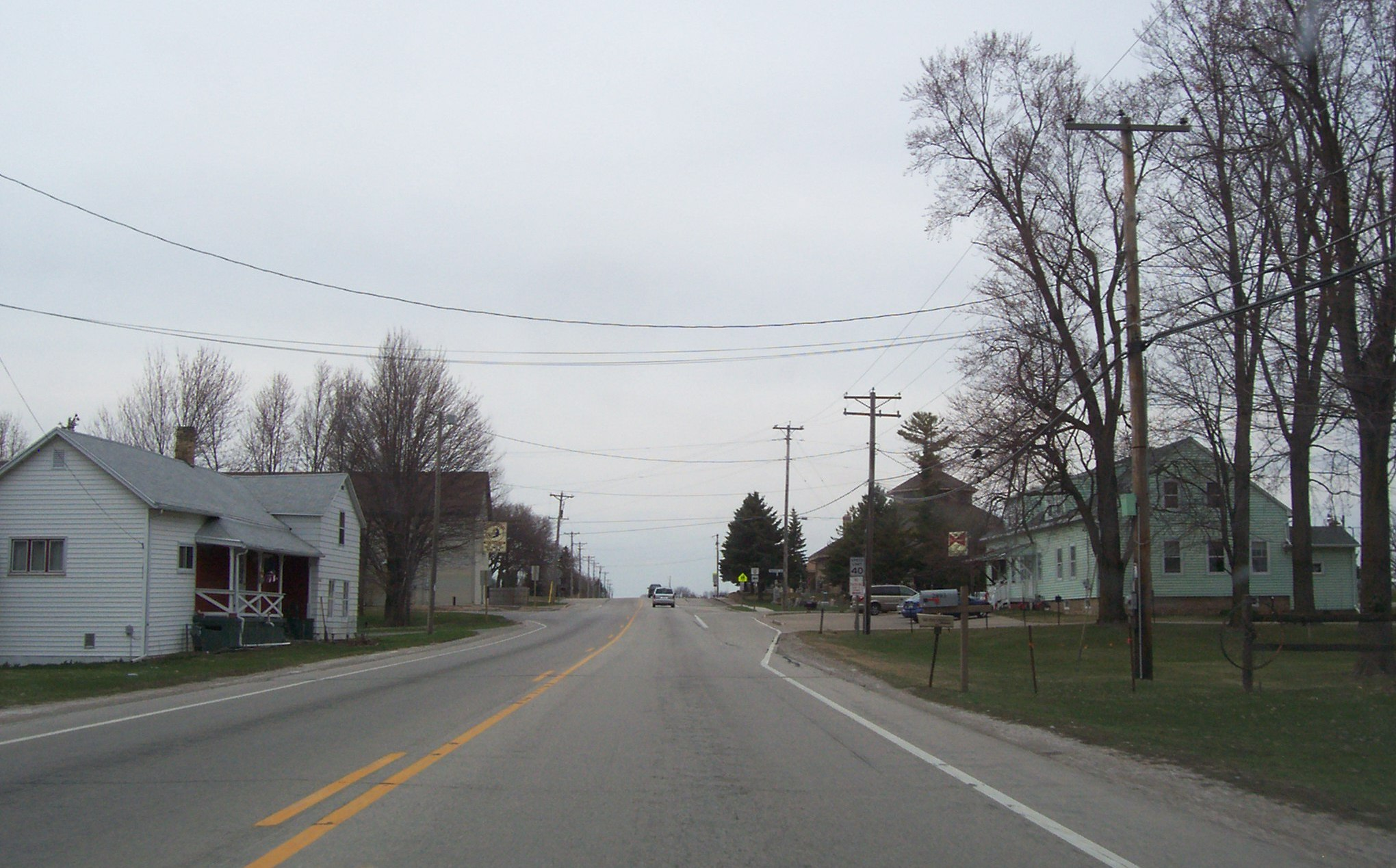
- Looking north at downtown Mackville on Wisconsin Highway 47

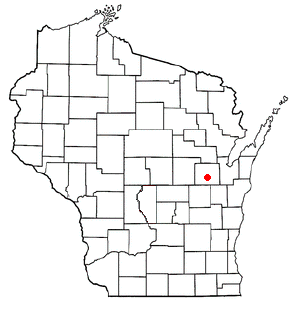
- Location of Mackville in Wisconsin
- Coordinates: 44°20′37″N 88°24′54″W
- Country: United States
- State: Wisconsin
- County: Outagamie
- Elevation: 814 ft (248 m)
- Time zone: UTC-6 (Central (CST))
  - Summer (DST): UTC-5 (CDT)
- Area code: 920
- GNIS feature ID: 1568874

Mackville is an unincorporated community in Outagamie County, Wisconsin, United States. It is located in the town of Center, three miles north of the City of Appleton. It is a part of the Appleton, Wisconsin Metropolitan Statistical Area, which is a part of the Fox Cities metropolitan area.

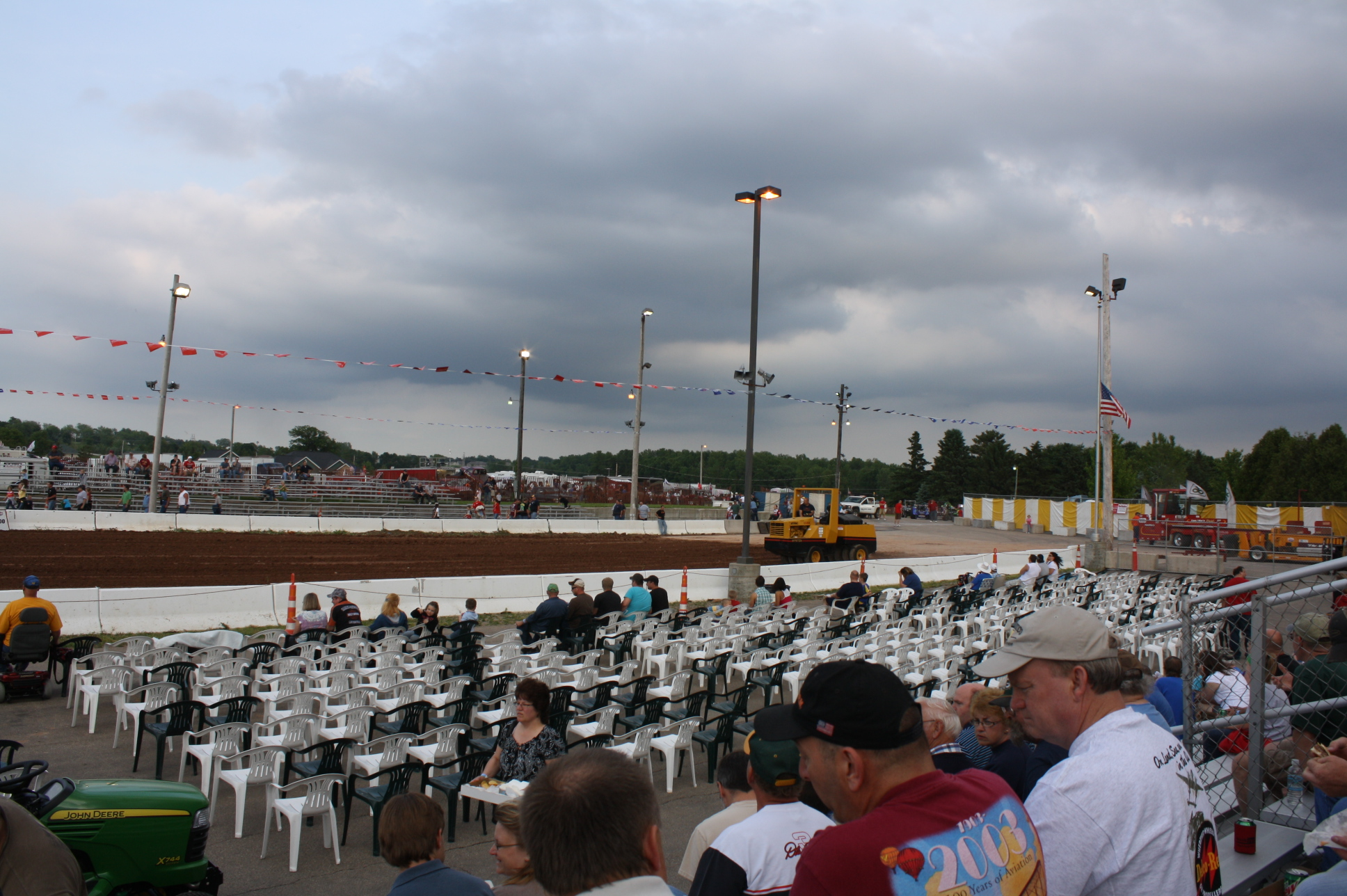
Track for the 2011 Mackville Nationals

Mackville is the location of the Mackville Nationals Truck and Tractor Pull.

== Education ==
Mackville has one school, a parochial school. Saint Edward's School serves as a preschool for the area.

== In popular culture ==
- Tom Thiel released a song in 2021 called "Unincorporated Town", which references his hometown of Mackville, WI.
