= Charles Clack =

American politician (1857–1932)

Charles Clack (February 18, 1857 – January 4, 1932) was an American farmer and politician.

Born in Coventry or Oxfordshire, England, Clack emigrated with his parents to the United States in 1867 and settled in the town of Burnett, Dodge County, Wisconsin. In 1878, Clack moved to the town of Freedom, Outagamie County, Wisconsin, where he was a farmer. Clack served as chairman of the Freedom Town Board. He also served as a trustee for the Outagamie Insane Asylum. He served on the school board and was treasurer and clerk of the school board. In 1897, Clack served in the Wisconsin State Assembly and was a Republican. Later, Clack moved to Appleton, Wisconsin, and was involved with business. Clack died at his home in Orlando, Florida, and was buried in Appleton, Wisconsin.
