= Oneida (town), Wisconsin =

Town in Outagamie County, Wisconsin

Oneida, Wisconsin
- Town
- Town of Oneida
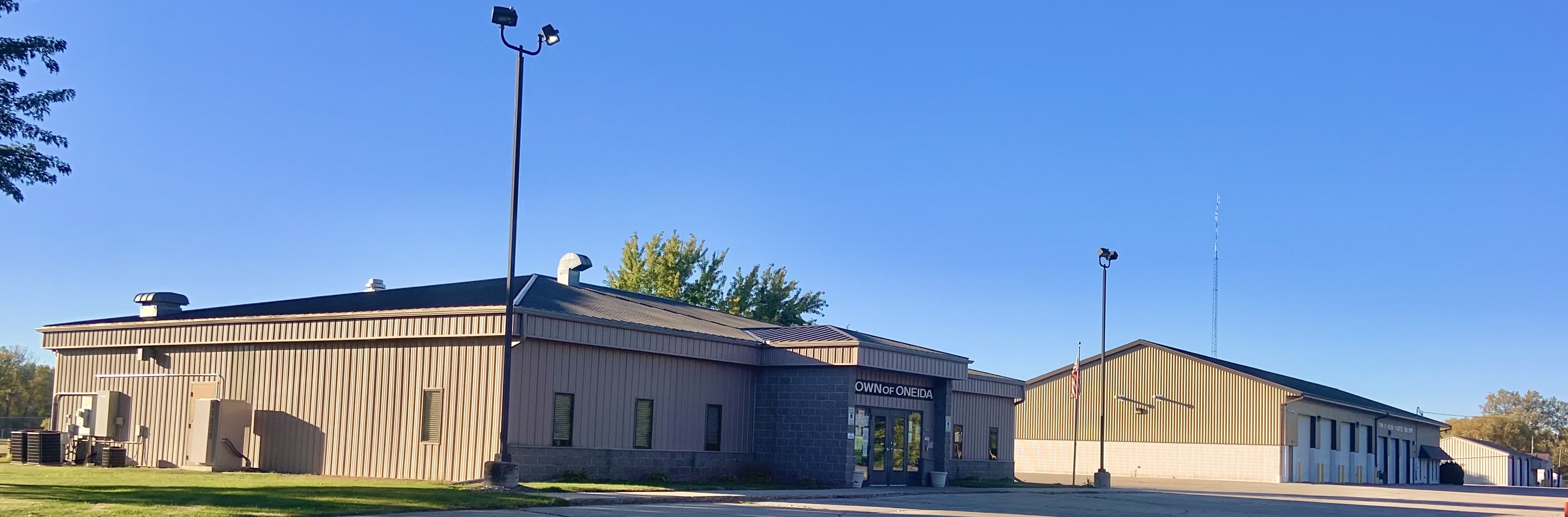
- Oneida Town Hall

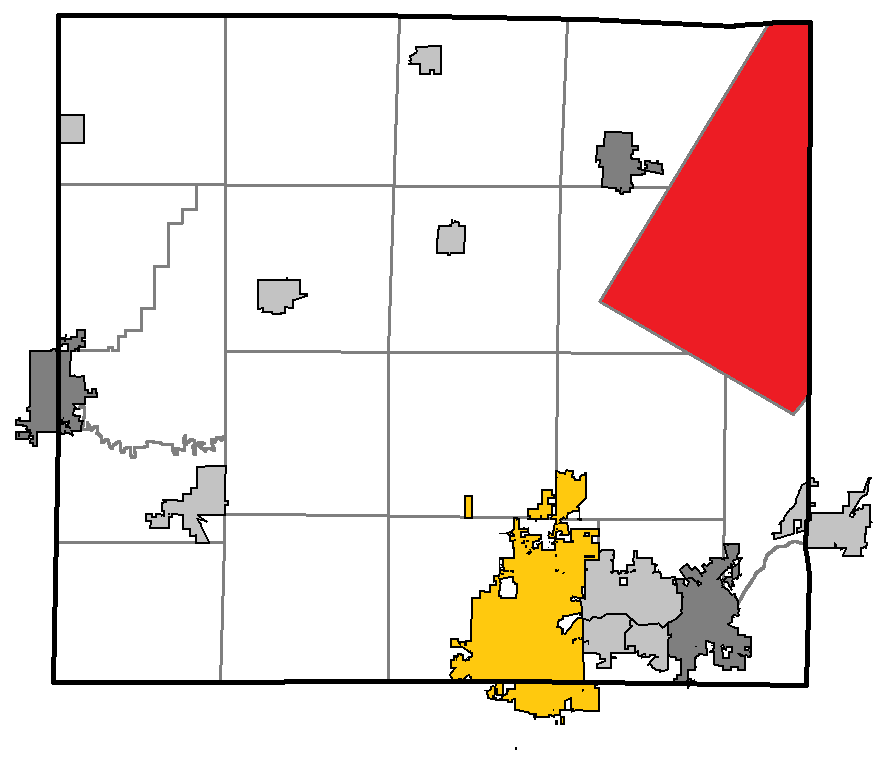
- Location of Oneida, within Outagamie County
- Coordinates: 44.4667°N 88.2500°W
- Country: United States
- State: Wisconsin
- County: Outagamie

Area
  - Total: 60.79 sq mi (157.4 km^{2})
  - Land: 60.78 sq mi (157.4 km^{2})
  - Water: 0.01 sq mi (0.026 km^{2})

Population (2020)
  - Total: 4,579
  - Density: 75.34/sq mi (29.09/km^{2})
- Time zone: UTC-6 (Central (CST))
  - Summer (DST): UTC-5 (CDT)
- Area code(s): 920 & 274
- GNIS feature ID: 1583863

Oneida is a town in Outagamie County, Wisconsin, United States. The population was 4,579 at the 2020 census. The unincorporated communities of Chicago Corners and Oneida are located in the town. The town occupies the Outagamie County portion of Wisconsin's Oneida Nation of Wisconsin.

== History ==
Oneida was created on May 20, 1903.

== Geography ==
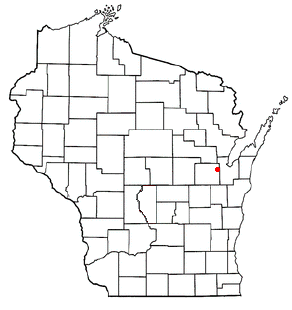
Location of Oneida (town), Wisconsin

According to the United States Census Bureau, the town has a total area of 60.8 square miles (157.5 km^{2}), of which 60.8 square miles (157.5 km^{2}) is land and 0.02% is water.

== Demographics ==
As of the census of 2000, there were 4,001 people, 1,267 households, and 1,055 families residing in the town. The population density was 65.8 people per square mile (25.4/km^{2}). There were 1,316 housing units at an average density of 21.6 per square mile (8.4/km^{2}). The racial makeup of the town was 57.56% White, 0.25% African American, 38.54% Native American, 0.15% Asian, 0.25% from other races, and 3.25% from two or more races. Hispanic or Latino of any race were 3.15% of the population.

There were 1,267 households, out of which 43.2% had children under the age of 18 living with them, 64.5% were married couples living together, 13.3% had a female householder with no husband present, and 16.7% were non-families. 13.2% of all households were made up of individuals, and 5.3% had someone living alone who was 65 years of age or older. The average household size was 3.16 and the average family size was 3.45.

In the town, the population was spread out, with 33.2% under the age of 18, 8.2% from 18 to 24, 28.9% from 25 to 44, 22.4% from 45 to 64, and 7.3% who were 65 years of age or older. The median age was 33 years. For every 100 females, there were 103.0 males. For every 100 females age 18 and over, there were 97.1 males.

The median income for a household in the town was $51,275, and the median income for a family was $54,341. Males had a median income of $35,669 versus $26,646 for females. The per capita income for the town was $17,516. About 6.2% of families and 7.3% of the population were below the poverty line, including 4.7% of those under age 18 and 27.8% of those age 65 or over.

According to the U.S. Census Bureau's American Community Survey (2024 5-year estimates), the town of Oneida had an estimated population of approximately 4,560. The population density was about 75 people per square mile. The median age was approximately 38.5 years, and the median household income was $76,651. About 10.2% of the population lived below the poverty line.

== Education ==
A tribal K–12 school, Oneida Nation School System, is in Oneida.
