= Twelve Corners, Wisconsin =

- Unincorporated community
- Location within Wisconsin
- Coordinates: 44°27′30″N 88°27′21″W
- Country: United States
- State: Wisconsin
- County: Outagamie
- Elevation: 830 ft (252.9 m)
- Time zone: UTC-6 (Central (CST))
  - Summer (DST): UTC-5 (CDT)
- ZIP Codes: 54106 (Black Creek)
- Area code: 920

Twelve Corners is an unincorporated community in the town of Center in Outagamie County, Wisconsin, United States.

== Geography ==
Twelve Corners is located at 44°24′7″N 88°26′6″W (44.401944, -88.435). Its elevation is 830 feet (250 m).

== Transportation ==
WIS 47 Northbound, routes to Shawano. Southbound, WIS 47 routes to Appleton.
