= Lime Rock, Wisconsin =

- Ghost Town
- Location within Wisconsin
- Coordinates: 44°30′03.52″N 88°21′03.77″W
- Country: United States
- State: Wisconsin
- County: Outagamie
- Elevation: 850 ft (259 m)
- Time zone: UTC-6 (Central (CST))
  - Summer (DST): UTC-5 (CDT)
- ZIP Codes: 54165
- Area code: (920)

Lime Rock is a ghost town in Outagamie County, Wisconsin, United States. Once located in the town of Seymour and the town of Osborn, the ghost town has no surviving buildings.

== Geography ==
Lime Rock was located at 44°30′03.52″N 88°21′03.77″W (44.500978, -88.351047), with an elevation of 851 feet (259m).
