= James Lennon (Wisconsin politician) =

American politician

James Lennon was a member of the Wisconsin State Assembly.

== Biography ==
Lennon was born on March 16, 1837, in County Westmeath, Ireland. In 1854, he settled in Freedom, Outagamie County, Wisconsin. During the American Civil War, he served with the 12th Wisconsin Volunteer Infantry Regiment of the Union Army, originally as an enlisted man and later as an officer. In 1872, Lennone moved to Appleton, Wisconsin.

== Political career ==
Lennon was a member of the Assembly in 1883. Previously, he had been a member of the county board of Outagamie County, Wisconsin, in 1881, Sheriff of Outagamie County in 1873, 1874, 1878 and 1879 and town treasurer of Freedom in 1878, 1879, 1880 and 1881. He was a Democrat.
