= Osborn, Wisconsin =

- Town
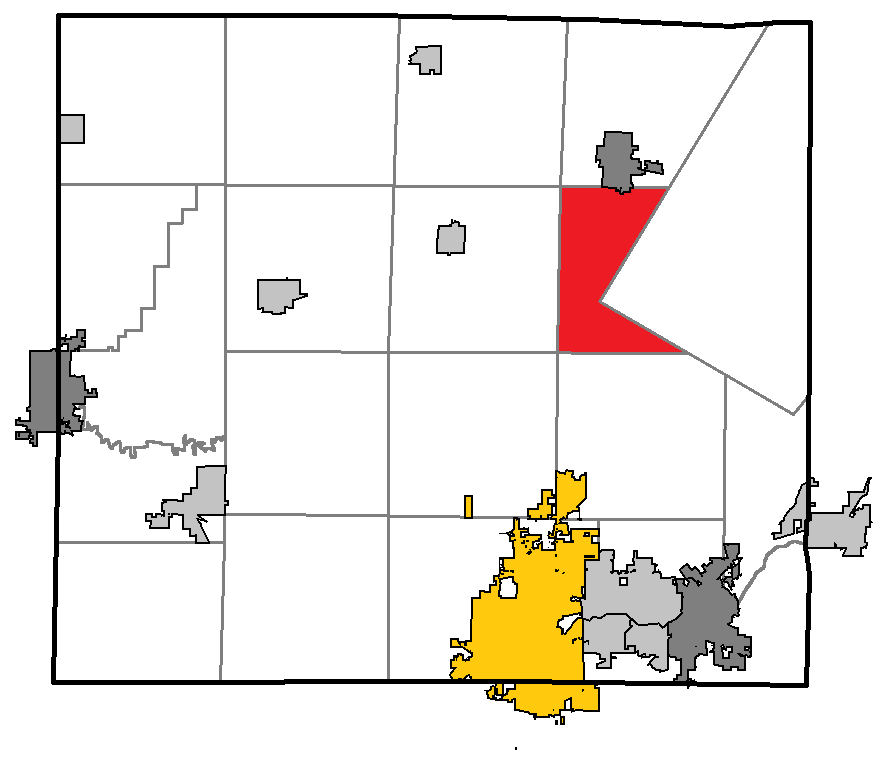
- Location of Osborn, Wisconsin
- Coordinates: 44°27′21″N 88°20′25″W
- Country: United States
- State: Wisconsin
- County: Outagamie
- Established: 1859

Government
  - Type: Town Board

Area
  - Total: 16.9 sq mi (43.8 km^{2})
  - Land: 16.9 sq mi (43.8 km^{2})
  - Water: 0 sq mi (0.0 km^{2})
- Elevation: 807 ft (246 m)

Population (2020)
  - Total: 1,200
  - Density: 71/sq mi (27/km^{2})
- Time zone: UTC-6 (Central (CST))
  - Summer (DST): UTC-5 (CDT)
- FIPS code: 55-60400
- GNIS feature ID: 1583872

Osborn is a town in Outagamie County, Wisconsin, United States. The unincorporated community of Five Corners is partially located in the town. The ghost town of Lime Rock was also located partially in the town. The population was 1,200 at the 2020 census.

== Geography ==
According to the United States Census Bureau, the town has a total area of 16.9 square miles (43.8 km^{2}), of which 16.9 square miles (43.8 km^{2}) is land and 0.06% is water.

== Demographics ==
As of the 2020 census there were 1,200 people, 367 households, and 307 families living in the town. The population density was 71 people per square mile (27.4/km^{2}). There were 449 housing units at an average density of 26.5 per square mile (10.3/km^{2}). The racial makeup of the town was 97% White, 1.66% Native American, 0.17% Asian, and 1% from two or more races.

There were 367 households, out of which 25.9% had children under the age of 18 living with them, 79.6% were married couples living together, and 5.2% had a female householder with no husband present. 9.3% of all households were made up of individuals, and 2.7% had someone living alone who was 65 years of age or older. The average household size was 2.83 and the average family size was 3.07.

The age distribution of the town is as follows: 25.6% under the age of 19, 5.1% from 20 to 24, 21.9% from 25 to 44, 32.1% from 45 to 64, and 15.3% who were 65 years of age or older. The median age was 43.1 years. For every 100 females, there were 116.8 males.

The median income for a household in the town was $105,625, and the median income for a family was $109,688. About 3.7% of the population were below the poverty line, including 7.2% of those under age 18 and 0.6% of those age 65 or over.
