= Freedom, Outagamie County, Wisconsin =

Freedom, Wisconsin
- Town
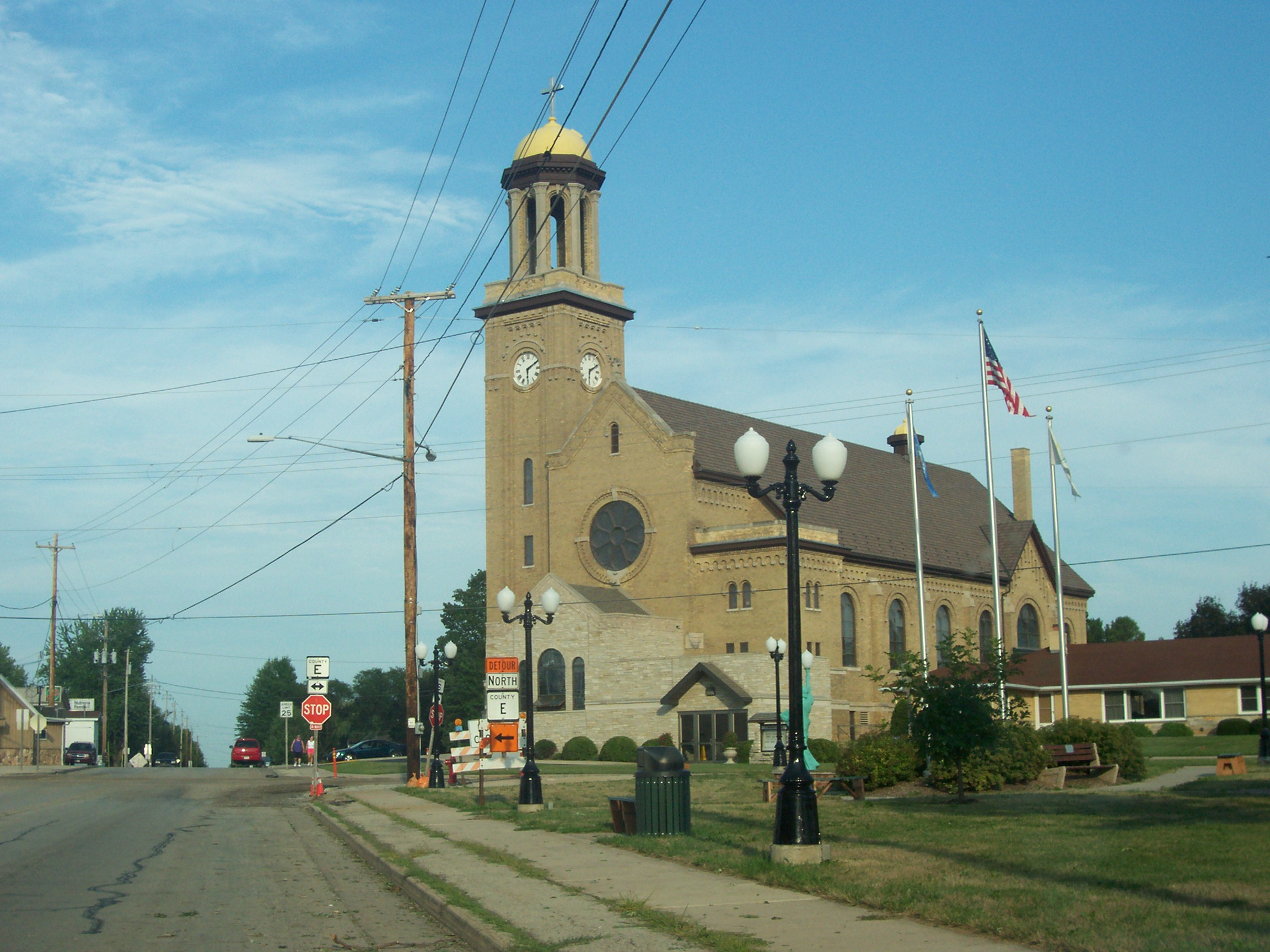
- St. Nicholas Catholic Church in Freedom

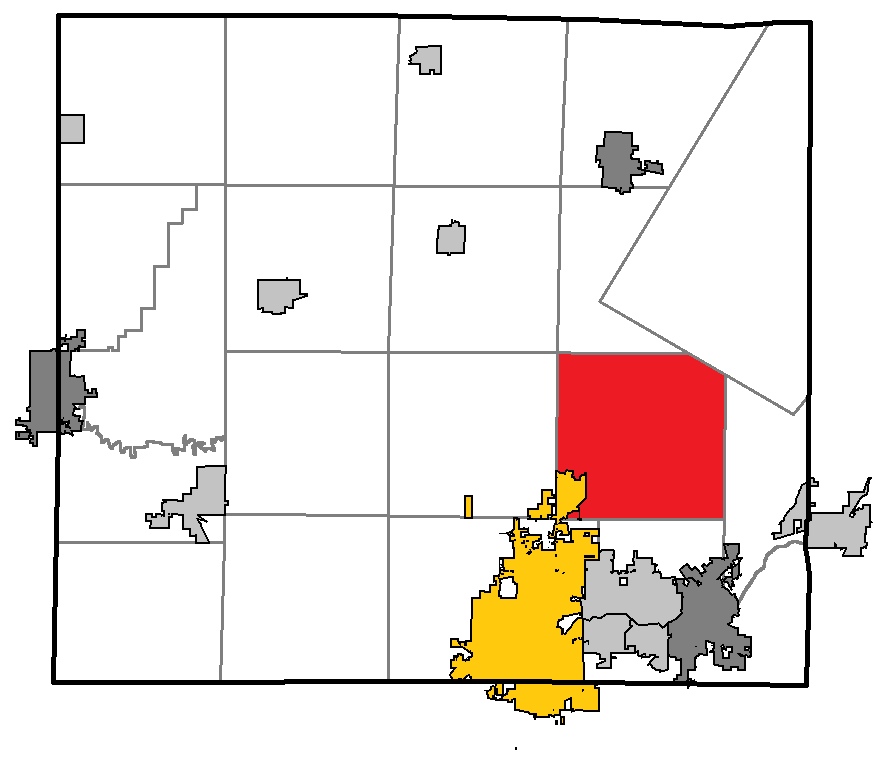
- Location of Freedom, within Outagamie County
- Coordinates: 44°22′14″N 88°18′6″W
- Country: United States
- State: Wisconsin
- County: Outagamie

Area
  - Total: 35.8 sq mi (92.6 km^{2})
  - Land: 35.8 sq mi (92.6 km^{2})
  - Water: 0 sq mi (0.0 km^{2})
- Elevation: 735 ft (224 m)

Population (2020)
  - Total: 6,216
  - Density: 174/sq mi (67.1/km^{2})
- Time zone: UTC-6 (Central (CST))
  - Summer (DST): UTC-5 (CDT)
- Area code: 920
- FIPS code: 55-27650
- GNIS feature ID: 1583242
- Website: https://townoffreedomocwi.gov/

Freedom is a town in Outagamie County, Wisconsin, United States. The population was 6,216 at the 2020 census. The unincorporated communities of Freedom and Murphy Corner are located in the town and the unincorporated community of Five Corners is located partially within the town.

== History ==
A freedman, James Andrew Jackson who likely escaped slavery via the Underground Railroad, had been working his way North through several Wisconsin towns until 1830, when he arrived in what would become the town of Freedom.

Jackson cleared roughly 9 acres of land, which he leased from the Oneida Nation, and settled there with his wife—a Stockbridge Indigenous woman he had met during his previous travels through the state—and their 6 year old daughter. He grew to be highly respected in the community, come 1852, he was approached by the town council proposing that they their town after him, as the first settler. Evidence from the minutes of a 1872 Outagamie County Pioneer Association meeting, confirmed that they considered him to hold the title of the "oldest settler,"

...they also make the distinction that he was colored, which was the language of the time. Jackson was asked by town residents if they could name the town "Jackson" after him, but he wanted the town to be named Freedom because this was where he obtained his freedom. ...And then they also marked a white settler as the oldest settler who was in attendance at the time,” said Mack as he points to Ephraim St. Louis of Little Chute. “And that’s the only other person here that’s marked as white. It’s just assumed that all of the other attendees at this meeting were in fact white. (Dustin Mack, main curator at the Freedom Area Historical Society, as cited in).

The Town of Freedom was thus established approx. 12 years after Jackson's arrival, on June 5, 1852 by effectively splitting itself off from the adjacent Town of Lansing endowing the newly established Town of Freedom most of Lansing's (prior) residents, its town seat, and all of its standing town officers. Lansing was renamed to the Town of Center, the following year, in 1853.

Jackson would later move on from the town he named to move to the nearby town of Appleton.

== Geography ==
According to the United States Census Bureau, the town has a total area of 35.8 square miles (92.6 km^{2}), all land.

== Demographics ==
Historical population
Census	Pop.	Note	%±
2000	5,241		—
2010	5,842		11.5%
2020	6,216		6.4%
U.S. Decennial Census

As of the census of 2020, there were 6,200 people, 2,143 households, and 1,451 families residing in the town. The population density was 173.2 people per square mile (107.6/km^{2}). There were 1,859 housing units at an average density of 52.0 per square mile (20.1/km^{2}). The racial makeup of the town was 97.6% White, 0.50% Native American, 0.08% Asian, 0.06% Pacific Islander, 0.19% from other races, and 0.29% from two or more races. Hispanic or Latino of any race were 0.80% of the population.

There were 2,143 households, out of which 43.2% had children under the age of 18 living with them, 70.0% were married couples living together, 5.3% had a female householder with no husband present, and 20.8% were non-families. 15.6% of all households were made up of individuals, and 4.5% had someone living alone who was 65 years of age or older. The average household size was 2.87 and the average family size was 3.23.

In the town, the population was spread out, with 27.3% under the age of 18, 8.2% from 18 to 24, 34.5% from 25 to 44, 20.3% from 45 to 64, and 11.1% who were 65 years of age or older. The median age was 33 years. For every 100 females, there were 104.5 males. For every 100 females age 18 and over, there were 104.5 males.

The median income for a household in the town was $83,935, and the median income for a family was $60,587. Males had a median income of $37,423 versus $26,727 for females. The per capita income for the town was $22,462. About 1.5% of families and 2.5% of the population were below the poverty line, including 5.3% of those under age 18 and 1.3% of those age 65 or over.

== Transportation ==
The unincorporated hamlet of Freedom is located at the intersections of county roads S and E and State Highway 55. The town is north of the Fox Valley, and southwest of the Green Bay, Wisconsin. These roads connect Freedom to many surrounding areas including, Appleton, Green Bay and other areas of upper Wisconsin.

== Media ==
The Freedom Pursuit was the community newspaper. It was discontinued after one of the main writers, Roger Griepentrog, died after a three year battle with cancer during September of 2024.

Within its borders, Freedom has a Drive in Theater named Field Of Scenes. This theater houses 300 cars maximum and plays classic and new movies.

== Images ==
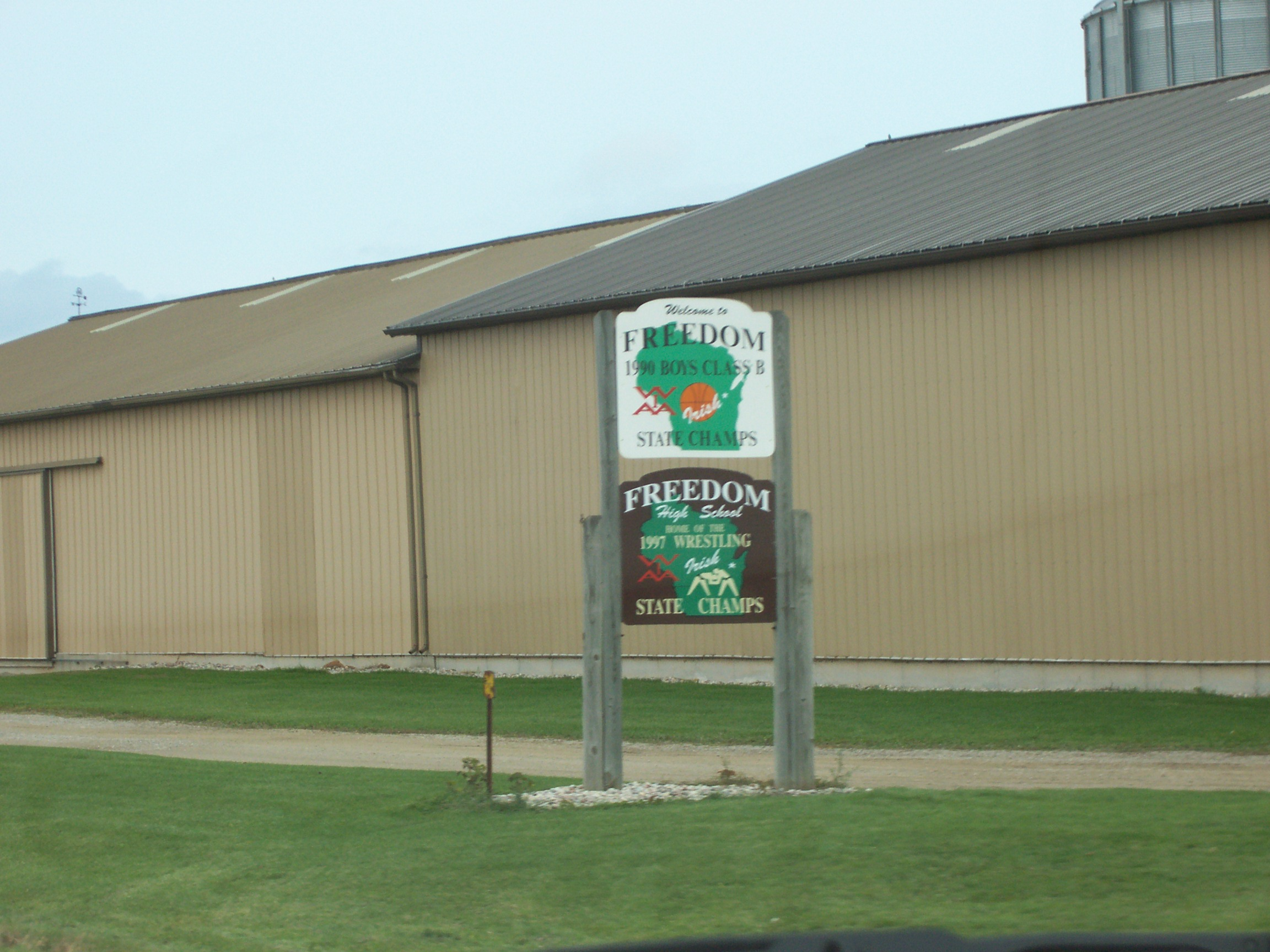
Welcome sign

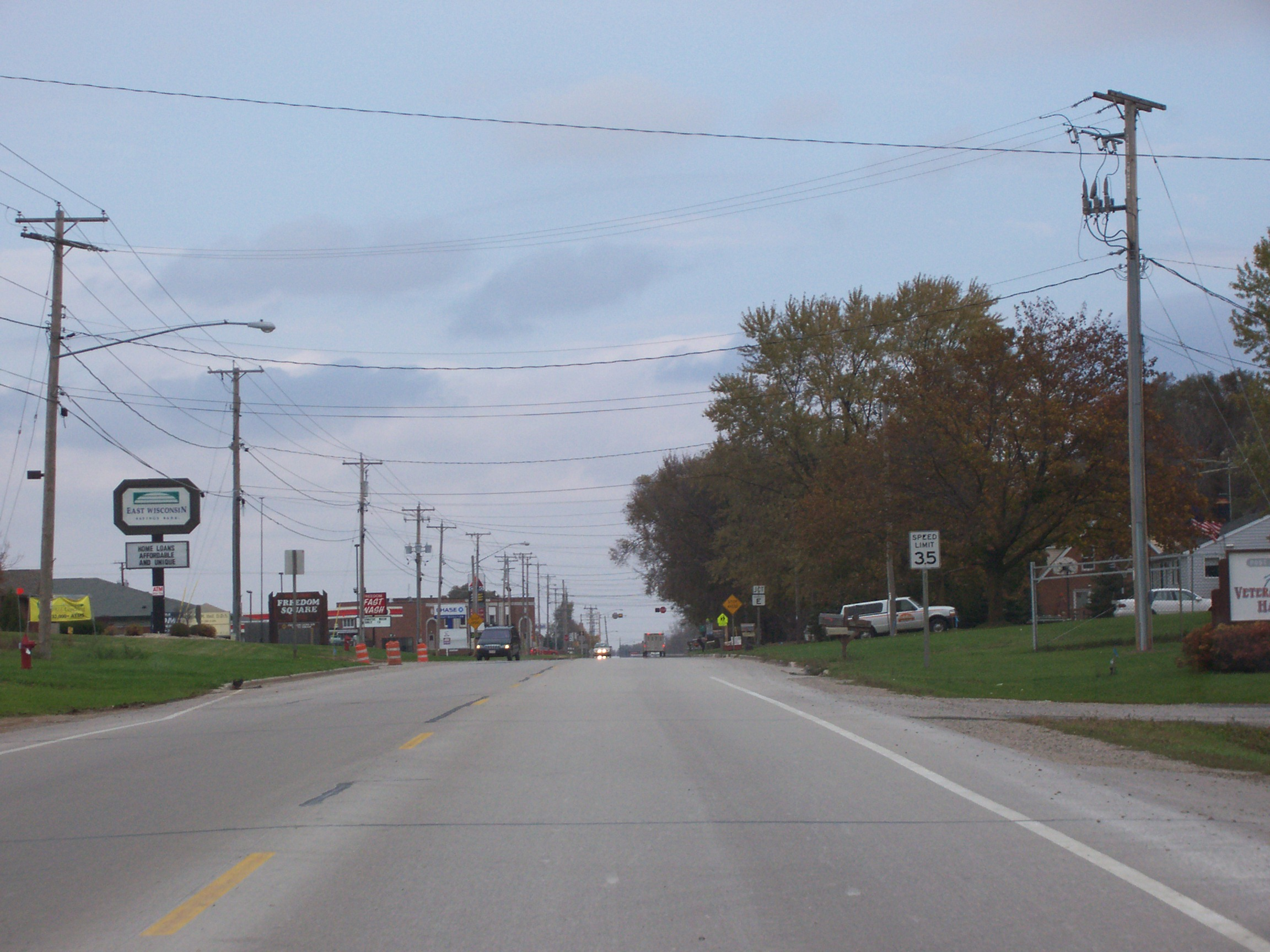
Looking north at Freedom from Highway 55

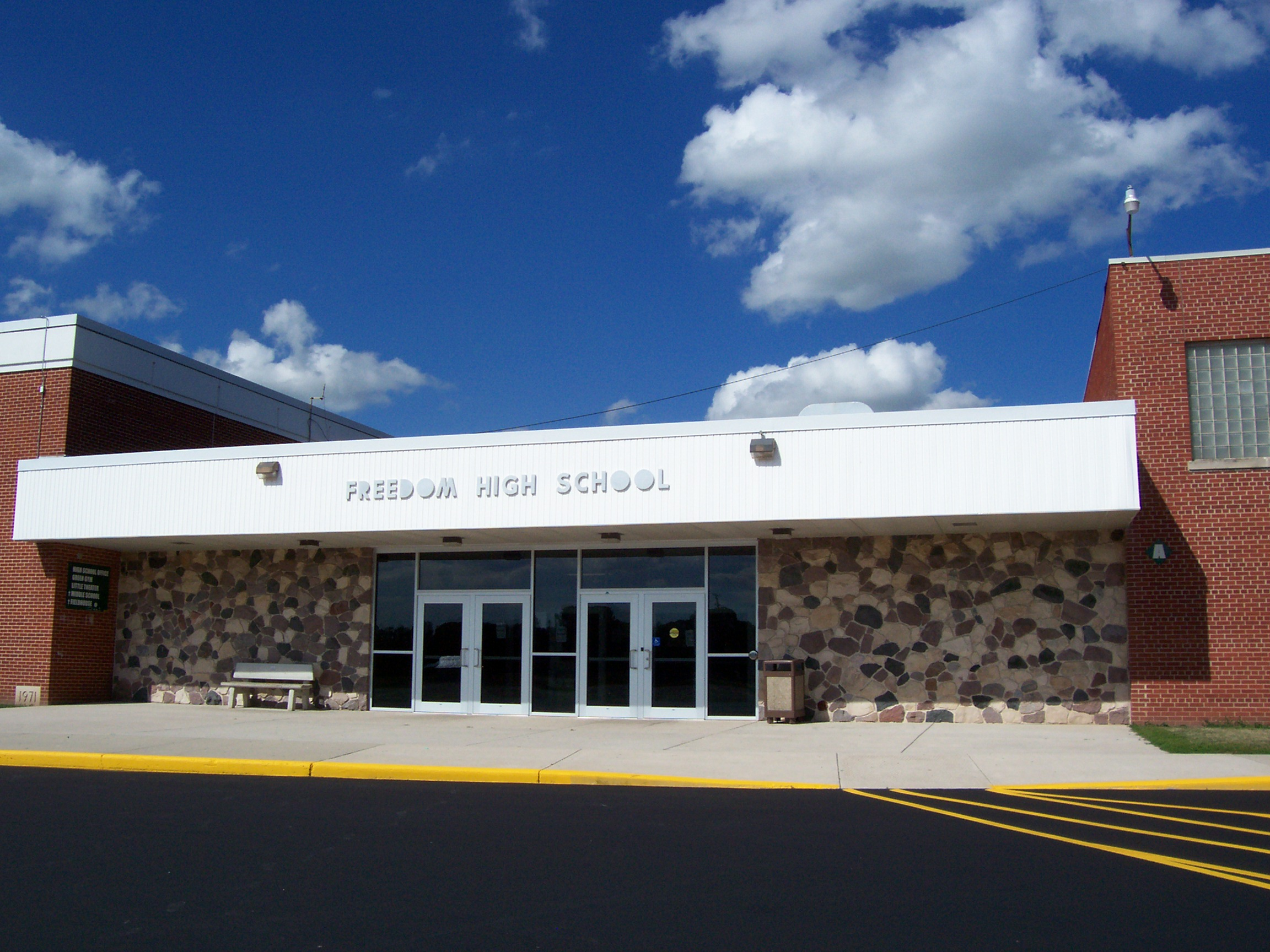
Freedom High School

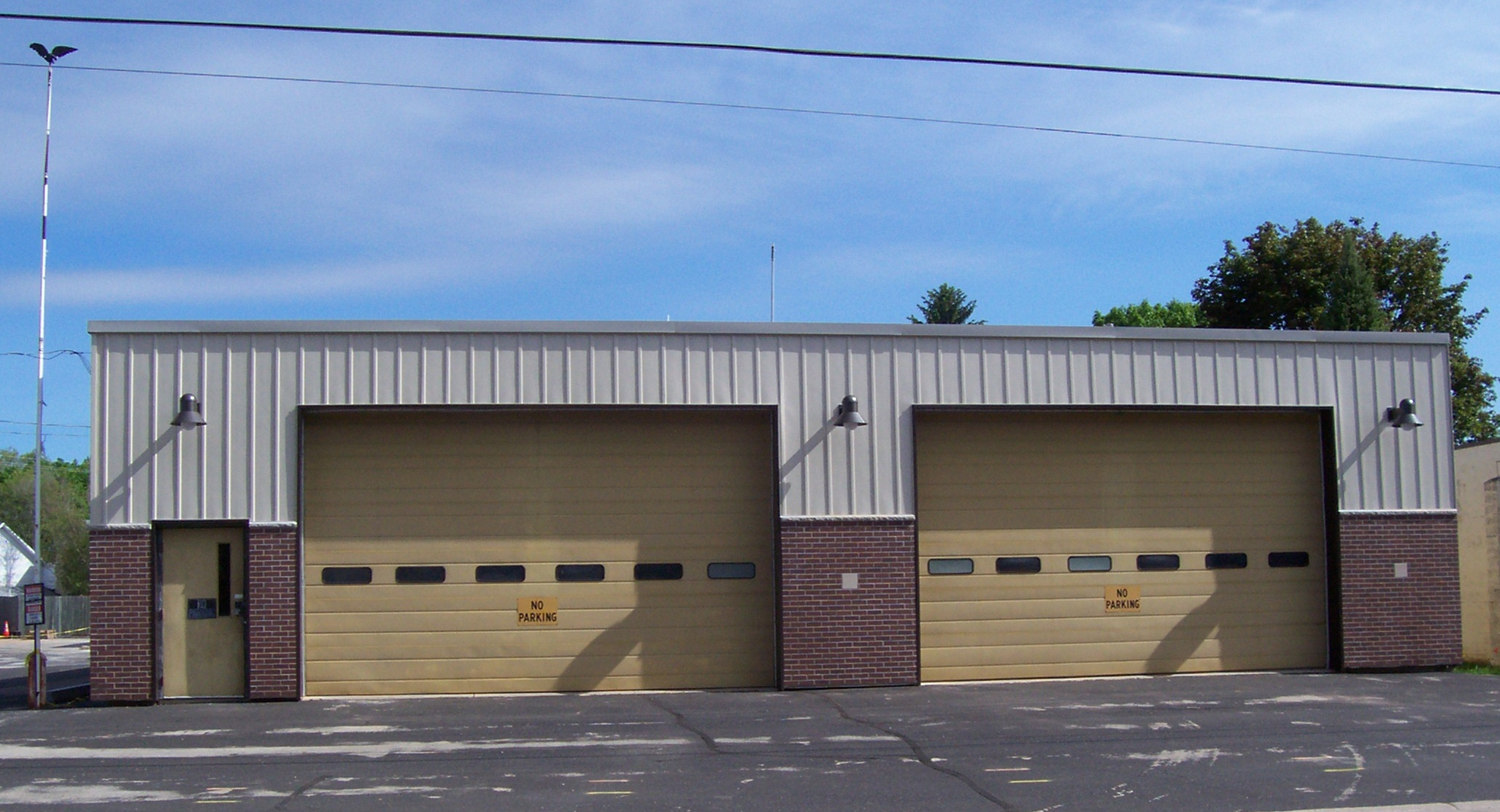
Freedom town hall and fire station

== Notable people ==
- Charles Clack, Wisconsin politician
- Cole Konrad, MMA fighter, first Bellator Heavyweight World Champion
- James Lennon, Wisconsin politician
- Garrett Lowney, 2000 Olympic bronze medalist in Greco-Roman wrestling
- James McCann, Wisconsin politician
