= Center Valley, Wisconsin =

- Unincorporated community
- Location within Wisconsin Location within the United States
- Coordinates: 44°24′8″N 88°27′35″W
- Country: United States
- State: Wisconsin
- County: Outagamie
- Elevation: 820 ft (250 m)
- Time zone: UTC-6 (Central (CST))
  - Summer (DST): UTC-5 (CDT)
- ZIP Code: 54106 (Black Creek)
- Area code: 920
- GNIS feature ID: 1562893

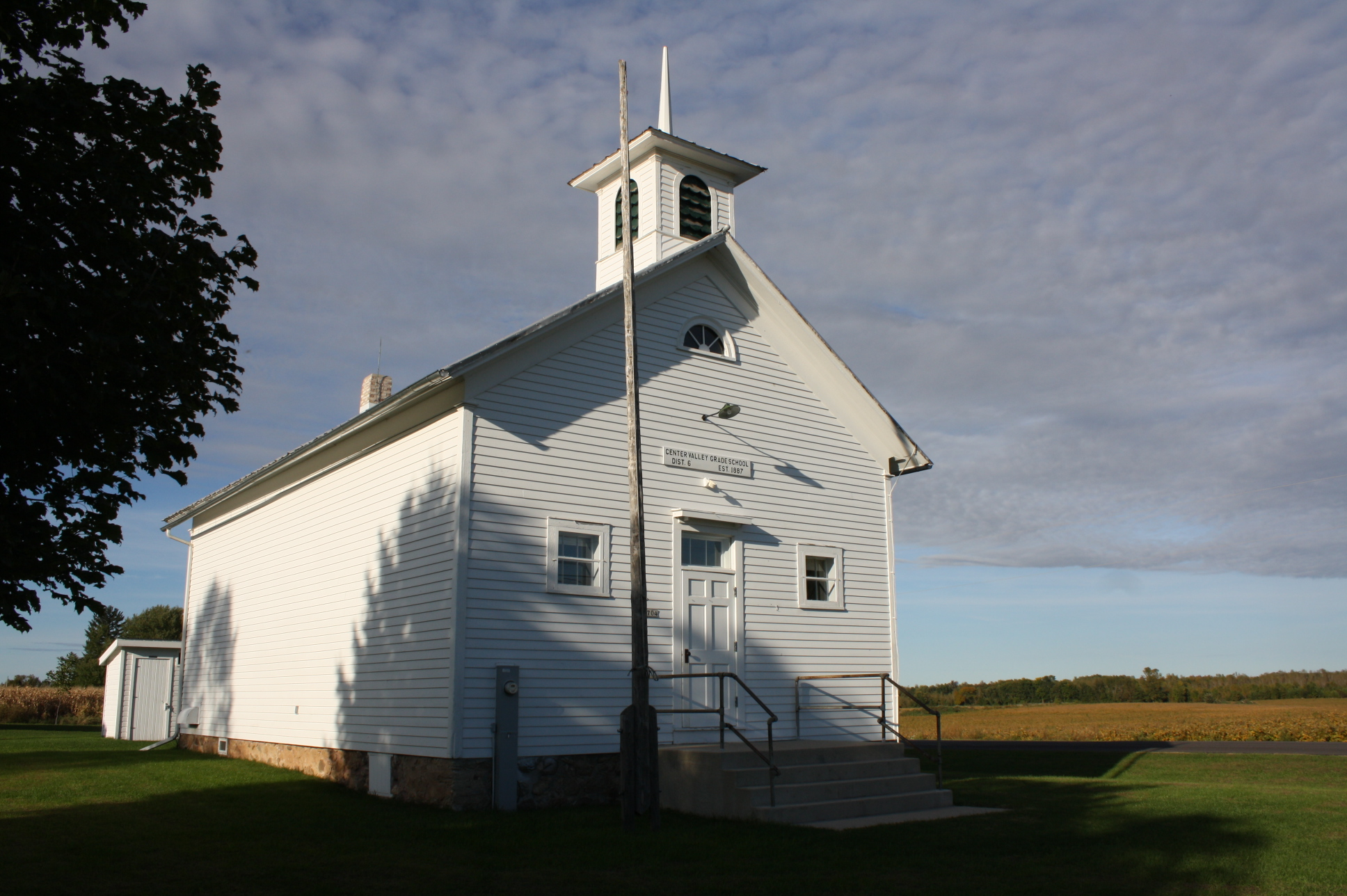
Center Valley Grade School House. It is listed on the National and State Historical Sites.

Center Valley is an unincorporated community in the town of Center, Outagamie County, Wisconsin, United States. Center Valley lies 5 miles (8.0 km) north of the City of Appleton, and is served by the post office of Black Creek, which has the ZIP code 54106.

== History ==
In 1997, The Post-Crescent described Center Valley as a rural business district near County Trunk A and Center Valley Road. The newspaper reported that local business owners had formed the Center Valley Business Association in 1993 to promote the community.

== Geography ==
Center Valley is located at 44°24′8″N 88°27′35″W (44.4022079, -88.4598254), and the elevation is 820 feet (250 m).

== Transportation ==
- County Highway A runs north–south through Center Valley.
- Center Valley Road runs east–west through Center Valley.
- The Canadian National Railway operates a line as well as a station in Center Valley.
