= James McCann (Wisconsin politician) =

American politician (1924–2009)

James A. McCann (March 7, 1924 – February 20, 2009) was an American politician.

Born in Freedom, Wisconsin, McCann graduated from Freedom High School and served in the United States Army during World War II and the Korea War. McCann graduated from University of Wisconsin–Madison. In 1965 and 1967, he served in the Wisconsin State Assembly. In 1968, he was elected to the Milwaukee Common Council. McCann then served as the City Comptroller of Milwaukee from 1972 to 1992.
