= Five Corners, Outagamie County, Wisconsin =

Five Corners, Wisconsin
- Unincorporated community
- Location within Wisconsin Location within the United States
- Coordinates: 44°27′30″N 88°27′21″W
- Country: United States
- State: Wisconsin
- County: Outagamie
- Elevation: 814 ft (248.1 m)
- Time zone: UTC-6 (Central (CST))
  - Summer (DST): UTC-5 (CDT)
- ZIP Codes: 54165 (Seymour)
- Area code: 920

Five Corners is an unincorporated community in Outagamie County, Wisconsin, United States. It is located in the towns of Black Creek, Center, Freedom, and Osborn.

== Geography ==
Five Corners is located at 44°24′53″N 88°22′26″W (44.414722, -88.373889). Its elevation is 814 feet (248.1m).

== Transportation ==
Highway EE runs north-south through the community.
