= Chicago Corners, Wisconsin =

- Unincorporated community
- Location within Wisconsin Location within the United States
- Coordinates: 44°27′32″N 88°15′3″W
- Country: United States
- State: Wisconsin
- County: Outagamie
- Elevation: 758 ft (231 m)
- Time zone: UTC-6 (Central (CST))
  - Summer (DST): UTC-5 (CDT)
- ZIP Codes: 54115

Chicago Corners is an unincorporated community in Outagamie County, Wisconsin, United States. It is located in the Town of Oneida and in the Oneida Nation of Wisconsin.

== Geography ==
Chicago Corners is located at 44°27′32″N 88°15′3″W (44.474517, -88.450125). It is at an elevation of 758 feet (231 m).
