= Charles F. Ploeger =

American politician

Charles F. Ploeger (August 4, 1870 – May 26, 1916) was an American farmer, businessman, and politician.

Born in the town of Ellington, Outagamie County, Wisconsin, Ploeger moved with his parents to the town of Seymour. Ploeger farmed and raised livestock. He was also in the fire insurance business and was president of the Seymour State Bank. Ploeger was involved with the Seymour Fair Association. He served as Seymour Town Clerk and as chairman of the Seymour Town Board. Ploeger served in the Wisconsin State Assembly and was a Republican. He died of pneumonia at his home in Seymour, Wisconsin while still in office.
