= Hamples Corner, Wisconsin =

- Unincorporated community
- Location within Wisconsin Location within the United States
- Coordinates: 44°21′06″N 88°28′31″W
- Country: United States
- State: Wisconsin
- County: Outagamie
- Elevation: 793 ft (241.7 m)
- Time zone: UTC-6 (Central (CST))
  - Summer (DST): UTC-5 (CDT)
- ZIP Codes: 54106, 54913
- Area code: 920

Hamples Corner is an unincorporated community in the town of Center, Outagamie County, Wisconsin, United States. It is situated at the intersection of County Highway O and Hample Road.

== Geography ==
Hamples Corner is located at 44°21′06″N 88°28′31″W (44.35, -88.466667). Its elevation is 793 feet (241.7m).

== Transportation ==
Highway O - Western terminus is a roundabout with WIS 76 and Market Road, and its Eastern Terminus is County E.
