= Isaar, Wisconsin =

- Unincorporated community
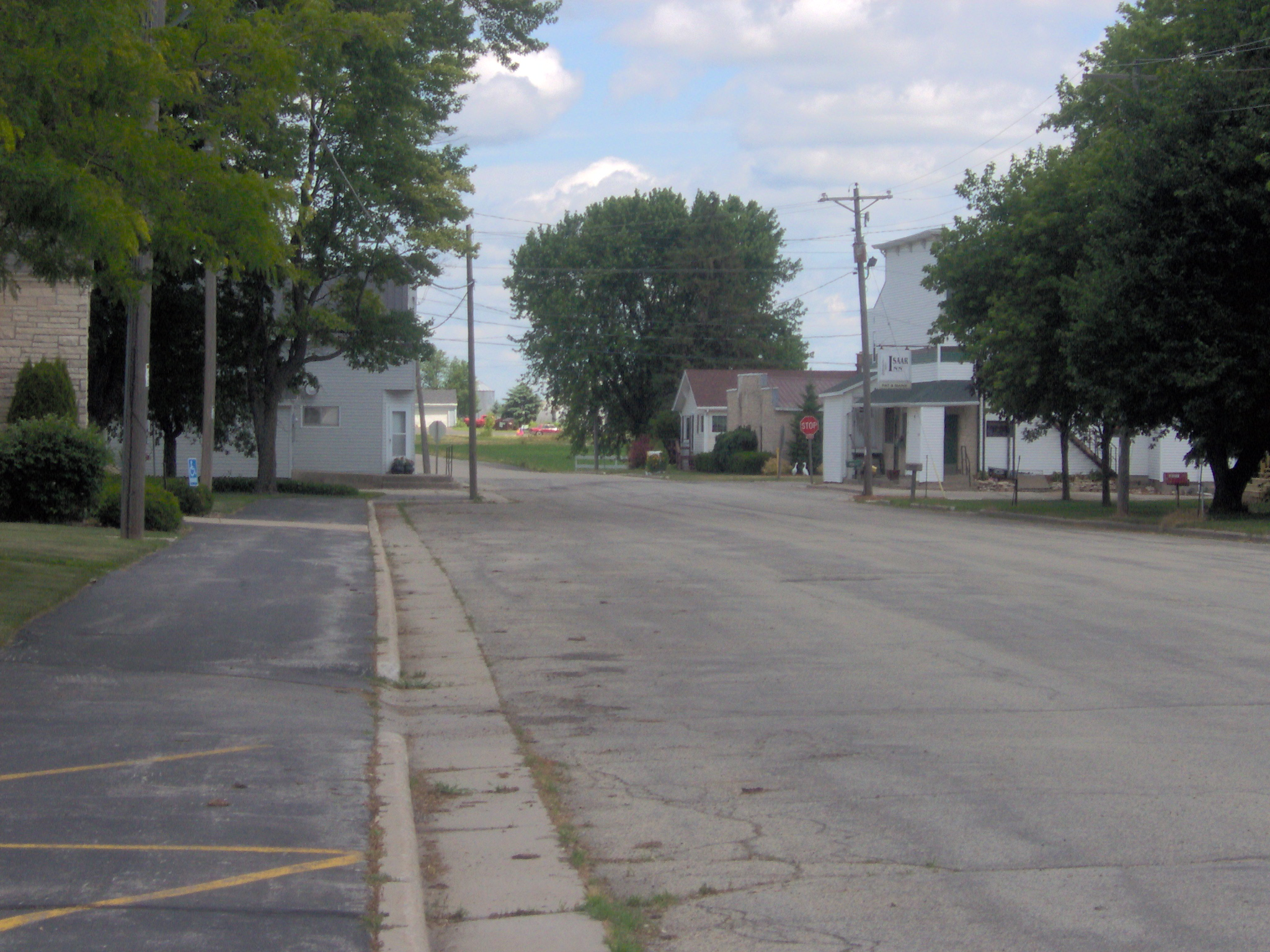
- Downtown Isaar (facing North on Isaar Rd)

- Location within Wisconsin Location within the United States
- Coordinates: 44°34′18″N 88°17′4″W
- Country: United States
- State: Wisconsin
- County: Outagamie
- Established: 1867

Area
  - Total: 0.4 sq mi (1.0 km^{2})
  - Land: 0.4 sq mi (1.0 km^{2})
  - Water: 0.0 sq mi (0 km^{2})
- Elevation: 784 ft (239 m)

Population
  - Total: 200 (Estimated)
- Time zone: UTC-6 (Central (CST))
  - Summer (DST): UTC-5 (CDT)
- Website: Isaar Booster Club

Isaar is a small unincorporated community in the Town of Seymour in Outagamie County, Wisconsin, United States, approximately 10 miles (16 km) from Green Bay. Isaar has the same zip code as the City of Seymour and its schools are part of the Seymour Community School District.

Isaar was founded in 1867 by immigrants from Bavaria who settled there as part of the Homestead Act. The town was named by the new settlers after the Isar River in their homeland. Isaar became known for its St. Sebastian Catholic Church, although in September 2007 the last resident priest left Isaar.

The community is home to a number of clubs, such as the snowmobile club, called the Isaar Trail Riders, and the Isaar Booster Club. The downtown area of Isaar is located at the intersection of County Hwy VV and Isaar Road. Isaar has always been known as a small farming community and continues this tradition today. Today the community has a tavern/restaurant, a construction company, a food processing plant, and a nursery, as well as few other businesses within its business district.

== Transportation ==
County Highway VV, running east–west, is the main road that connects Isaar to other, larger state highways. There are also snowmobile trails that run through the community.

== Geography ==
Isaar is located at 44°34′18″N 88°17′04″W (44.57167, -88.28444), at an elevation of 830 feet (250 m).

The land around Isaar is flat and very fertile. This makes it an excellent choice for growing cabbage and corn in the area. There are multiple creeks that run through the area, often man-made creeks to prevent flooding and to keep the run-off from damaging the fields.

== History ==
Isaar is located in the northeastern corner of the Town of Seymour. Named after the Isar River, in Germany, the community was founded in the late 1860s by Bavarian immigrants. The town's founding families included Kroner, Hackl, Ebert, Liebhabers, Krause, Wirth, Schmidt, Brugger, Hartl, and Noll.

In 1893, the Isaar community's request for a church was granted by the Roman Catholic Bishop of the Diocese of Green Bay, Sebastian Gebhard Messmer. St. Sebastian Church, named in honour of Bishop Messmer's patron saint, was a wooden building constructed by Isaar citizens on John Kroner's land, which is believed to have been donated. This church was completed in 1893 at a cost of $100. A cemetery was established north of the church two years later. The rectory was constructed in 1916 and the Isaar church was no longer a mission. In late December 1929, a fire destroyed the original church. The brick church that stands today was built shortly after the wooden church burned down. It was built by the Eisenreich Construction Company of Isaar.

Ebert's Store, which was the general store, grocery store, saloon and dance hall, was constructed in 1900 and is today the Isaar Inn. South of Ebert's store was the blacksmith shop, built in the 1890s. Isaar's First School was built one mile north of Isaar in 1898, now known as Seymour School District No. 7. In 1902 a tavern was opened by John Kroner to the north of the church cemetery. A sawmill was opened, by John Schmidt and Henry Wirth, 200 feet (61 m) east of Kroner's Tavern in 1908. The first cheese factory was built in 1890 by Jacob Noll just one mile (1.6 km) north of Isaar. In 1918 a cooperative cheese factory was begun by Isaar farmers. This factory, which is just north of the Isaar Inn, was operational until 1993.

=== History of church and community events ===
St. Sebastian Church had at one time an annual church picnic where all parish members could spend the day playing baseball and other games. St. Sebastian was also known for its locally famous "Annual Porky and Pancake Supper". This event was run by community volunteers and brought in revenue for the church youth organization. It was known for its potato pancakes, a favourite meal of the Isaar community. In 2002 St. Sebastian Church hosted the 50th anniversary of this event, which was the last Porky and Pancake Supper Isaar hosted. Low volunteer turnout has been attributed to the collapse of this event.
