= Center, Outagamie County, Wisconsin =

Town of Center, Wisconsin
- Town
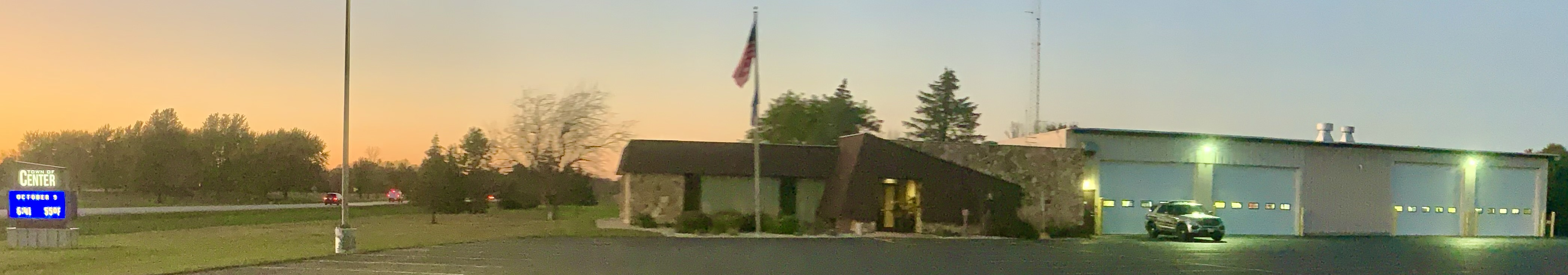
- Town hall
- Motto: Wide Awake Forward
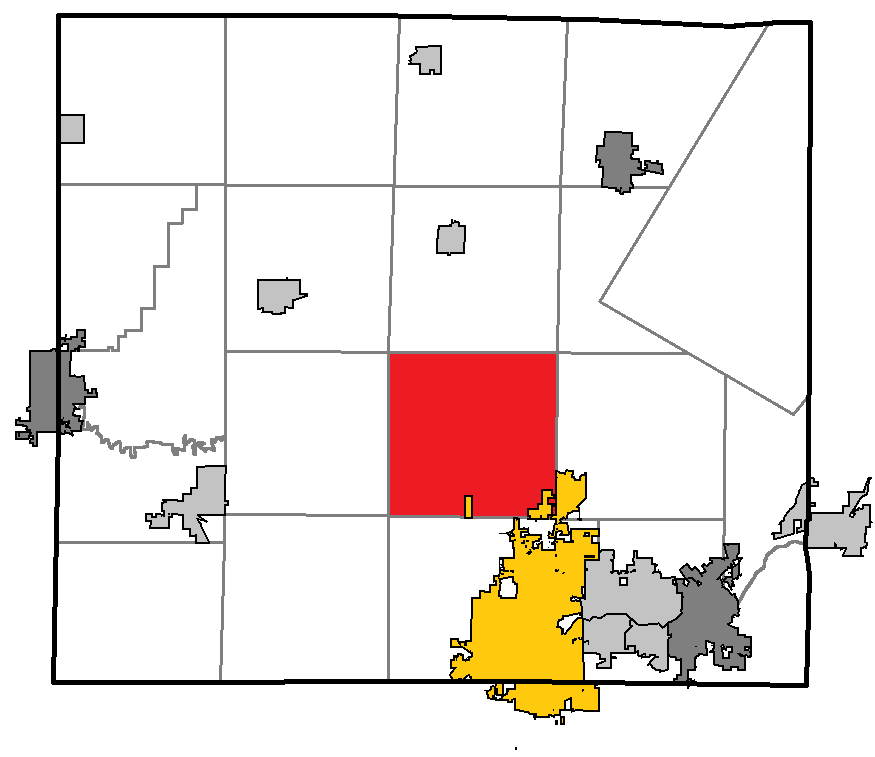
- Location of the Town of Center, within Outagamie County
- Coordinates: 44°22′34″N 88°26′25″W
- Country: United States
- State: Wisconsin
- County: Outagamie

Area
  - Total: 35.6 sq mi (92.3 km^{2})
  - Land: 35.6 sq mi (92.3 km^{2})
  - Water: 0 sq mi (0.0 km^{2})
- Elevation: 801 ft (244 m)

Population (2020)
  - Total: 3,622
  - Density: 102/sq mi (39.2/km^{2})
- Time zone: UTC-6 (Central (CST))
  - Summer (DST): UTC-5 (CDT)
- FIPS code: 55-13600
- GNIS feature ID: 1582941
- Website: https://centerwi.gov

The Town of Center is a located in Outagamie County, Wisconsin, United States. The population was 3,622 as of the 2020 census. The unincorporated communities of Center Valley, Hamples Corner, Mackville, and Twelve Corners are located in the town. The unincorporated community of Five Corners is also located partially in the town.

== History ==
The Town of Center began as the Town of Lansing, organized on September 12, 1849. It included the modern day areas of the towns of Freedom and Center, and "territory lying to the north that was sparsely settled". The town of Freedom was established as a new town split off from the town of Lansing on June 5, 1852. When the split occurred, Freedom took with it the officers of the town of Lansing, as well as the town seat, and many of its residents and public improvements.

A meeting was held on July 5, 1852, to fill the vacancies for the officers of the existing town of Lansing, although in practice this was the reorganization of a new town also called Lansing since there were no officers to provide continuity. The legality of the action was apparently questioned. An April 30, 1853, resolution of the board of supervisors of the town declared that the state of Wisconsin had granted legality to "acts of the town officers of last year", and also had granted the request of the board to have the name of the town changed from Lansing to Center, effective April 1, 1853.

== Geography ==
According to the United States Census Bureau, the town has a total area of 35.7 square miles (92.4 km^{2}), all land.

== Demographics ==
Historical population
Census	Pop.	Note	%±
1860	206		—
1870	1,201		483.0%
1880	1,596		32.9%
1890	1,488		−6.8%
1900	1,458		−2.0%
1910	1,310		−10.2%
1920	1,303		−0.5%
1930	1,213		−6.9%
1940	1,271		4.8%
1950	1,301		2.4%
1960	1,386		6.5%
1970	1,853		33.7%
1980	2,570		38.7%
1990	2,716		5.7%
2000	3,163		16.5%
2010	3,402		7.6%
2020	3,622		6.5%
U.S. Decennial Census

=== 2020 Census ===
Center racial composition
Race	Num.	Perc.
White (non-Hispanic)	3,394	93.70%
Black or African American (non-Hispanic)	13	0.35%
Native American	17	0.46%
Asian	47	1.29%
Other/Mixed	151	4.16%
Hispanic or Latino	54	1.4%

As of the 2020 United States census, there were 3,622 people, 1,446 households, and 1,165 families residing in the town.

=== 2010 Census ===
As of the 2010 United States census, there were 3,402 people, 1,271 households, and 1,046 families residing in the town. The population density was 95.2 people per square mile (36.8/km^{2}). There were 1,304 housing units at an average density of 36.5 per square mile (14.1/km^{2}). The racial makeup of the town was 98.55% White, 0.15% African American, 0.32% Native American, 0.24% Asian, 0.17% from other races, and 0.55% from two or more races. Hispanic or Latino of any race were 0.67% of the population.

There were 1,271 households, out of which 36.7% had children under the age of 18 living with them, 88.7% were married couples living together, 5.7% had a female householder with no husband present, and 17.8% were non-families. 14.4% of all households were made up of individuals, and 6.7% has someone living alone who was 65 years of age or older. The average household size was 2.65 and the average family size was 2.92.

In the town, the population was spread out, with 20.8% under the age of 18, 8.1% from 18 to 24, from 25 to 44, 34.3% from 45 to 64, and 10.1% 65 and older. The median age is 41.7 years. For every 100 females, there were 113.3 males.

The median income for a household in the town was $66,625, and the median income for a family was $68,506. Males had a median income of $36,250 versus $28,657 for females. The per capita income for the town was $29,075. 1.2% of families and 2.1% of the population below the poverty line, including no under eighteens and none of those over 64.

=== 2000 Census ===
As of the 2000 United States census, there were 3,163 people, 1,095 households, and 913 families residing in the town. The population density was 88.7 people per square mile (34.2/km^{2}). There were 1,105 housing units at an average density of 31.0 per square mile (12.0/km^{2}). The racial makeup of the town was 98.89% White, 0.09% African American, 0.54% Native American, 0.09% Asian, 0.03% from other races, and 0.35% from two or more races. Hispanic or Latino of any race were 0.66% of the population.

There were 1,095 households, out of which 38.8% had children under the age of 18 living with them, 77.4% were married couples living together, 3.2% had a female householder with no husband present, and 16.6% were non-families. 13.6% of all households were made up of individuals, and 4.4% had someone living alone who was 65 years of age or older. The average household size was 2.89 and the average family size was 3.19.

In the town, the population was spread out, with 27.1% under the age of 18, 7.1% from 18 to 24, 29.5% from 25 to 44, 27.9% from 45 to 64, and 8.4% who were 65 years of age or older. The median age was 38 years. For every 100 females, there were 109.5 males. For every 100 females age 18 and over, there were 108.8 males.

The median income for a household in the town was $58,092, and the median income for a family was $61,152. Males had a median income of $41,140 versus $26,080 for females. The per capita income for the town was $23,553. None of the families and 0.4% of the population were living below the poverty line, including no under eighteens and none of those over 64.
