= Freedom (community), Outagamie County, Wisconsin =

Freedom, Wisconsin
- Unincorporated community
- Location within Wisconsin Location within the United States
- Coordinates: 44°23′11″N 88°17′19″W
- Country: United States
- State: Wisconsin
- County: Outagamie
- Elevation: 751 ft (229 m)
- Time zone: UTC-6 (Central (CST))
  - Summer (DST): UTC-5 (CDT)
- ZIP code: 54131
- Area code: 920
- GNIS feature ID: 1565290

Freedom is an unincorporated community located in the town of Freedom, Outagamie County, Wisconsin, United States. Freedom is located along Wisconsin Highway 55, 7.5 miles (12.1 km) north of Kaukauna. Freedom has a post office, located in Kaukauna, which uses ZIP code 54131.

Before the establishment of the Town of Freedom on June 5, 1853, evidence suggests that this community was named Sagole or Sagola, a Native American word meaning "good morning". Further, this name's use fell out of favor after the name of the surrounding town was established, and the community began using the name Freedom as well.

Freedom is home to a high school that won many state championships.

== Images ==
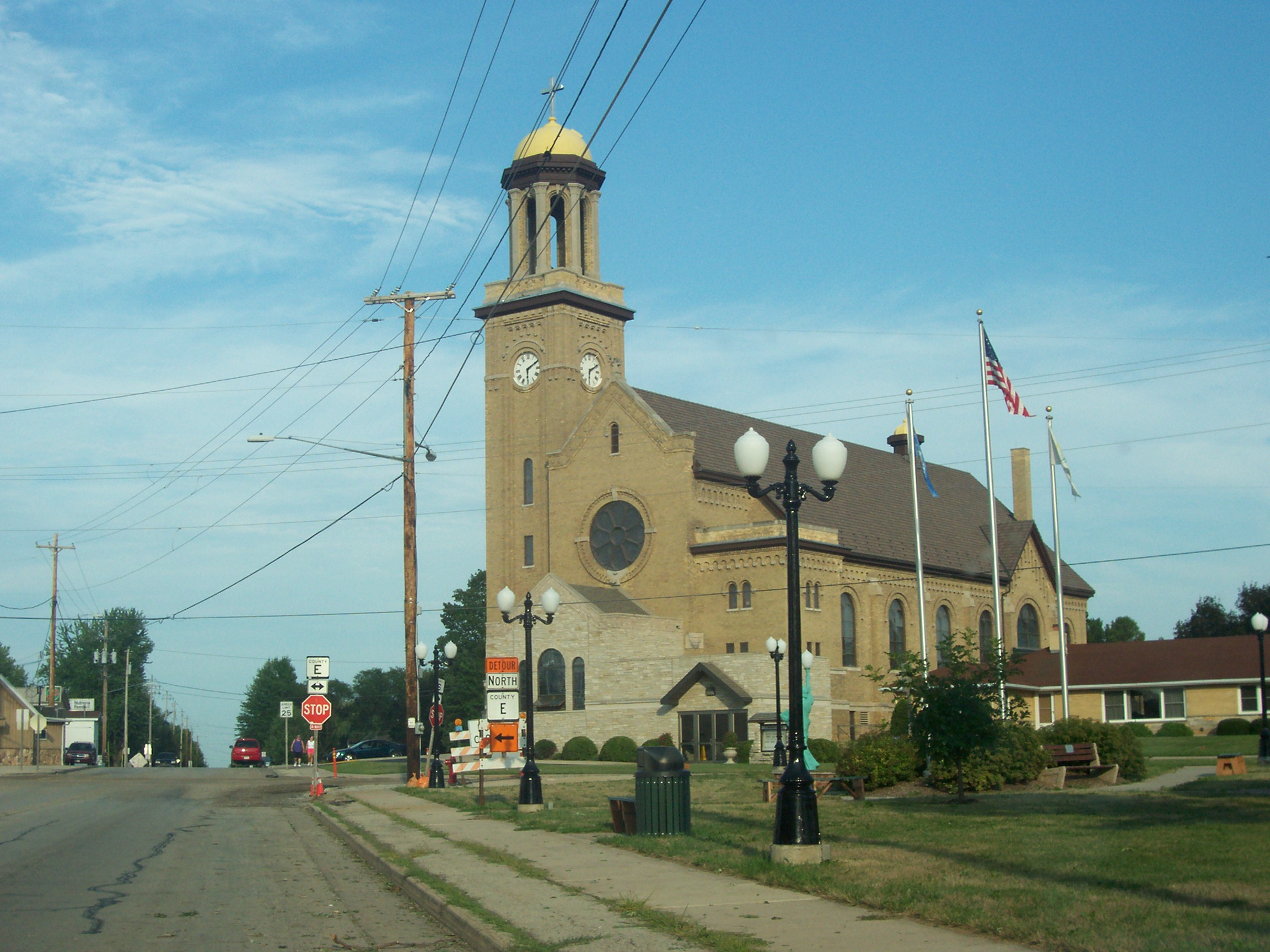
St Nicholas Catholic Church

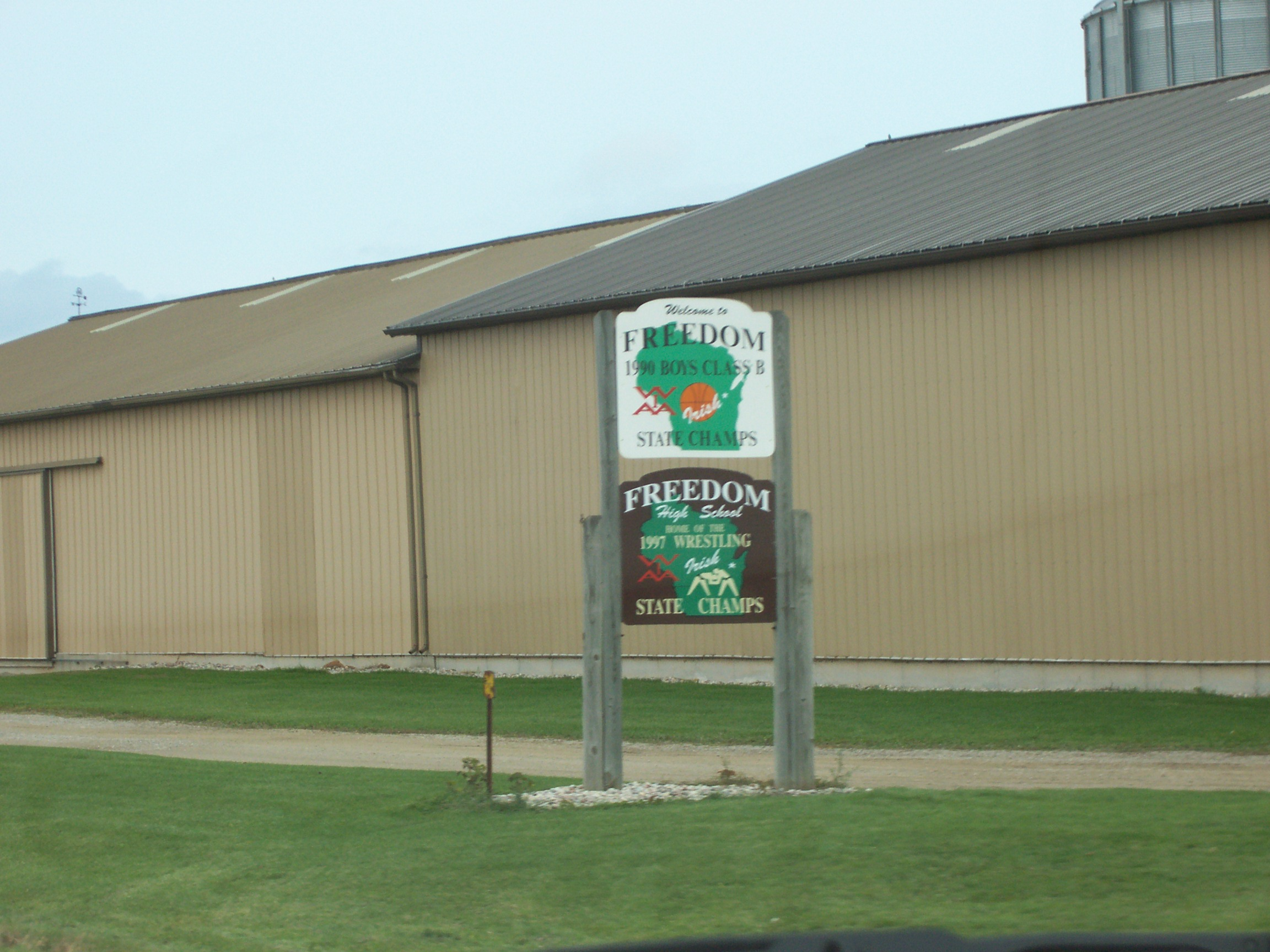
Welcome sign

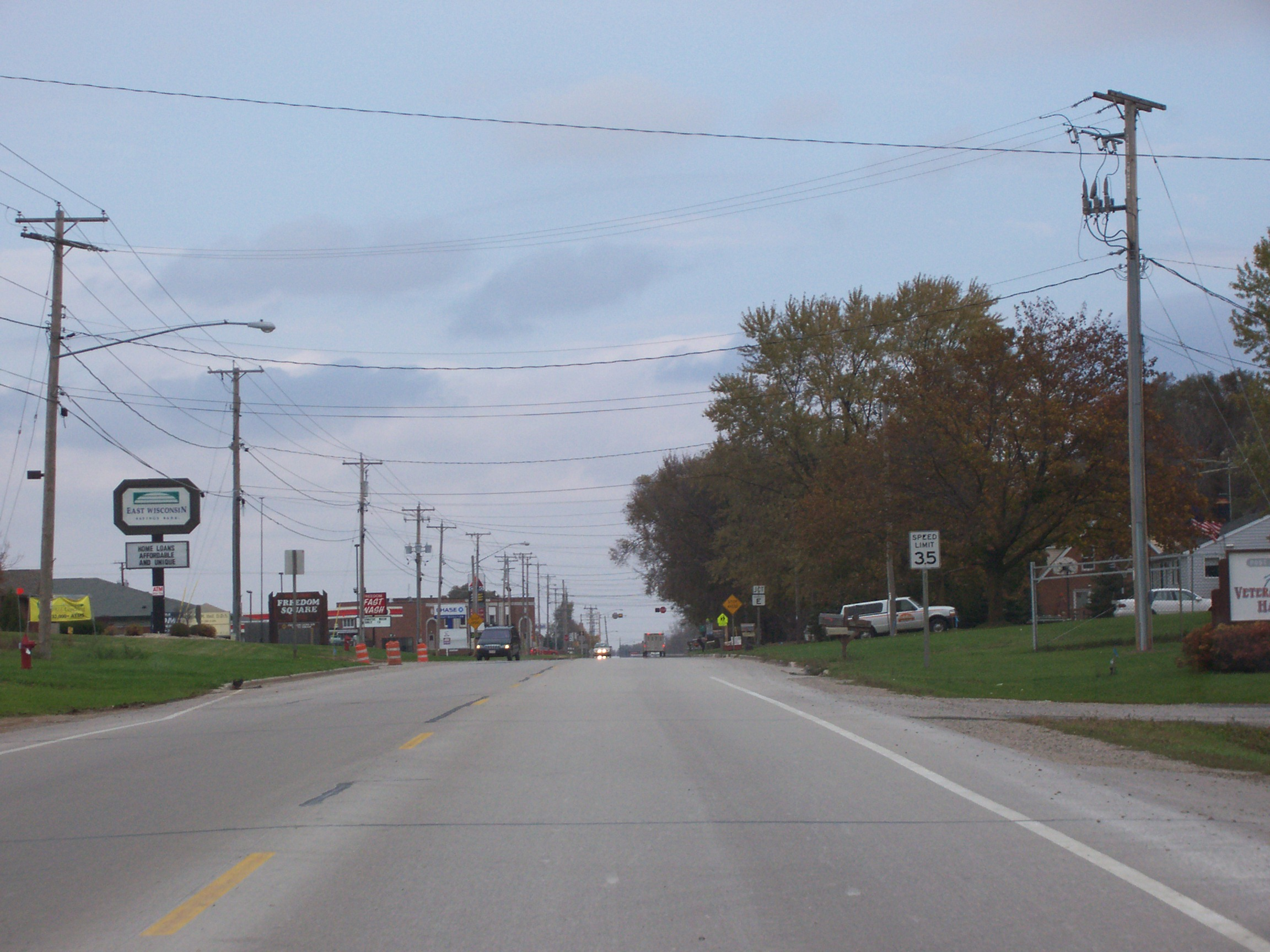
Looking north at Freedom from Highway 55

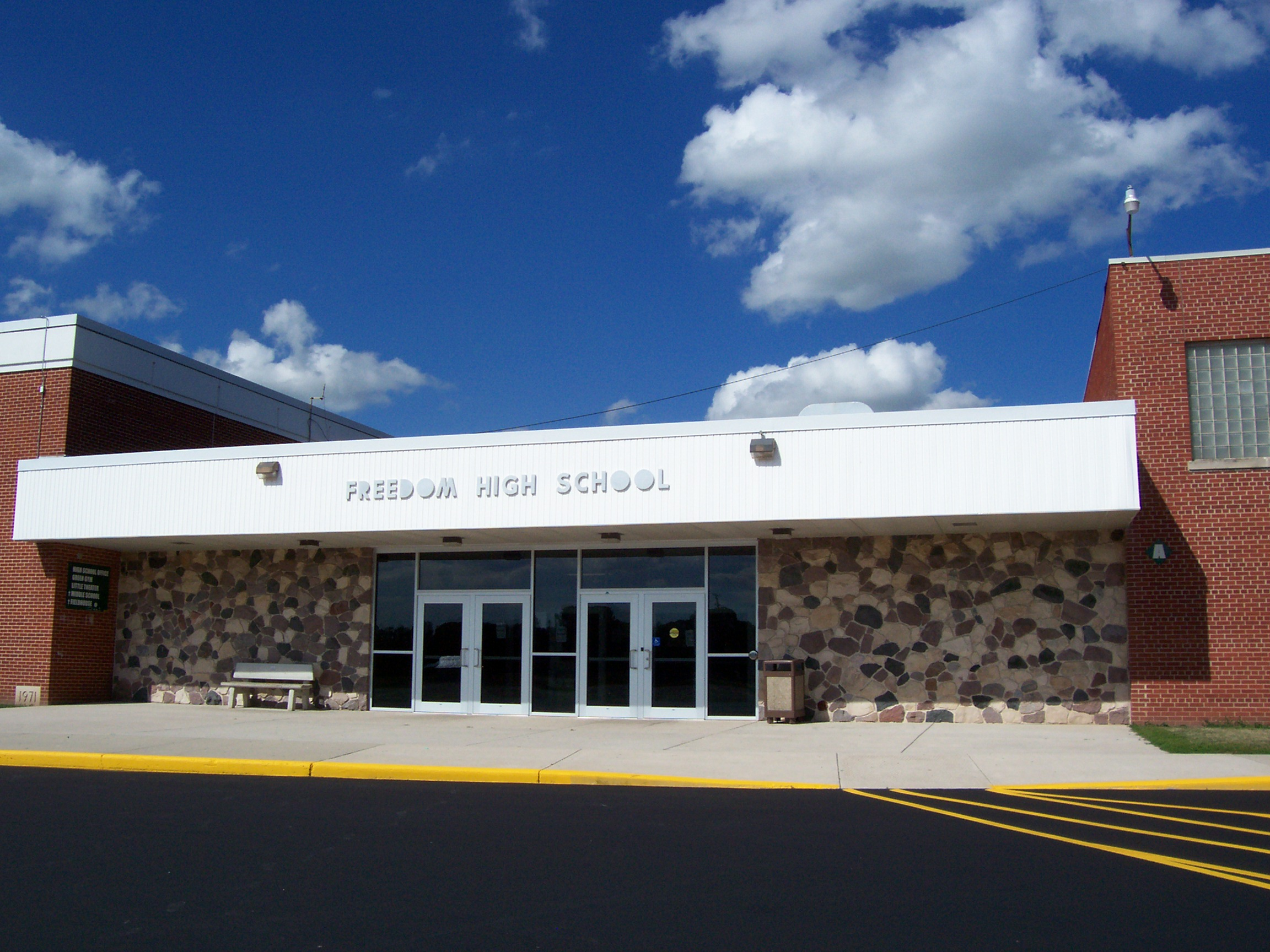
Freedom High School

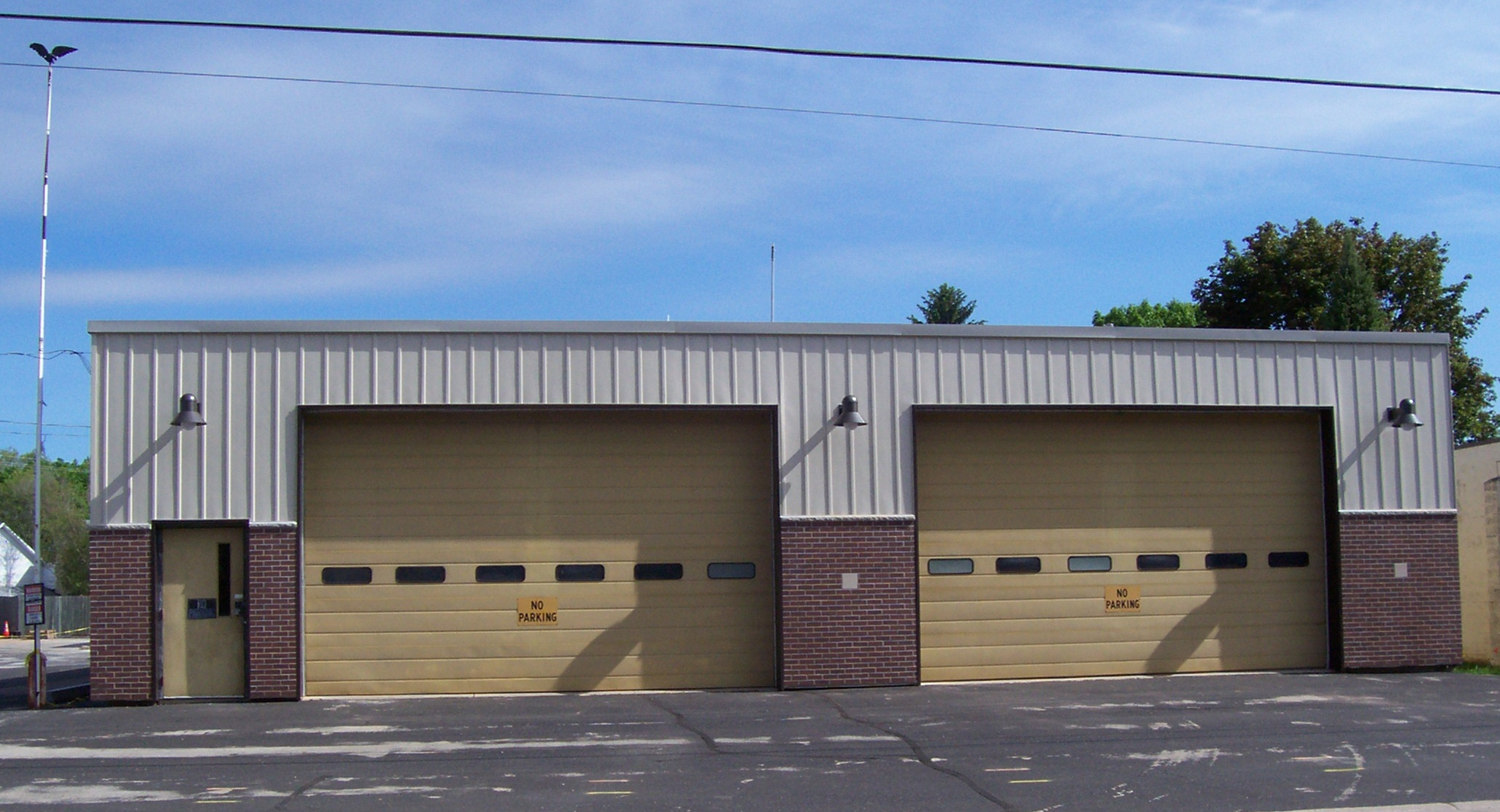
Freedom town hall and fire station
