= Outagamie County, Wisconsin =

- County
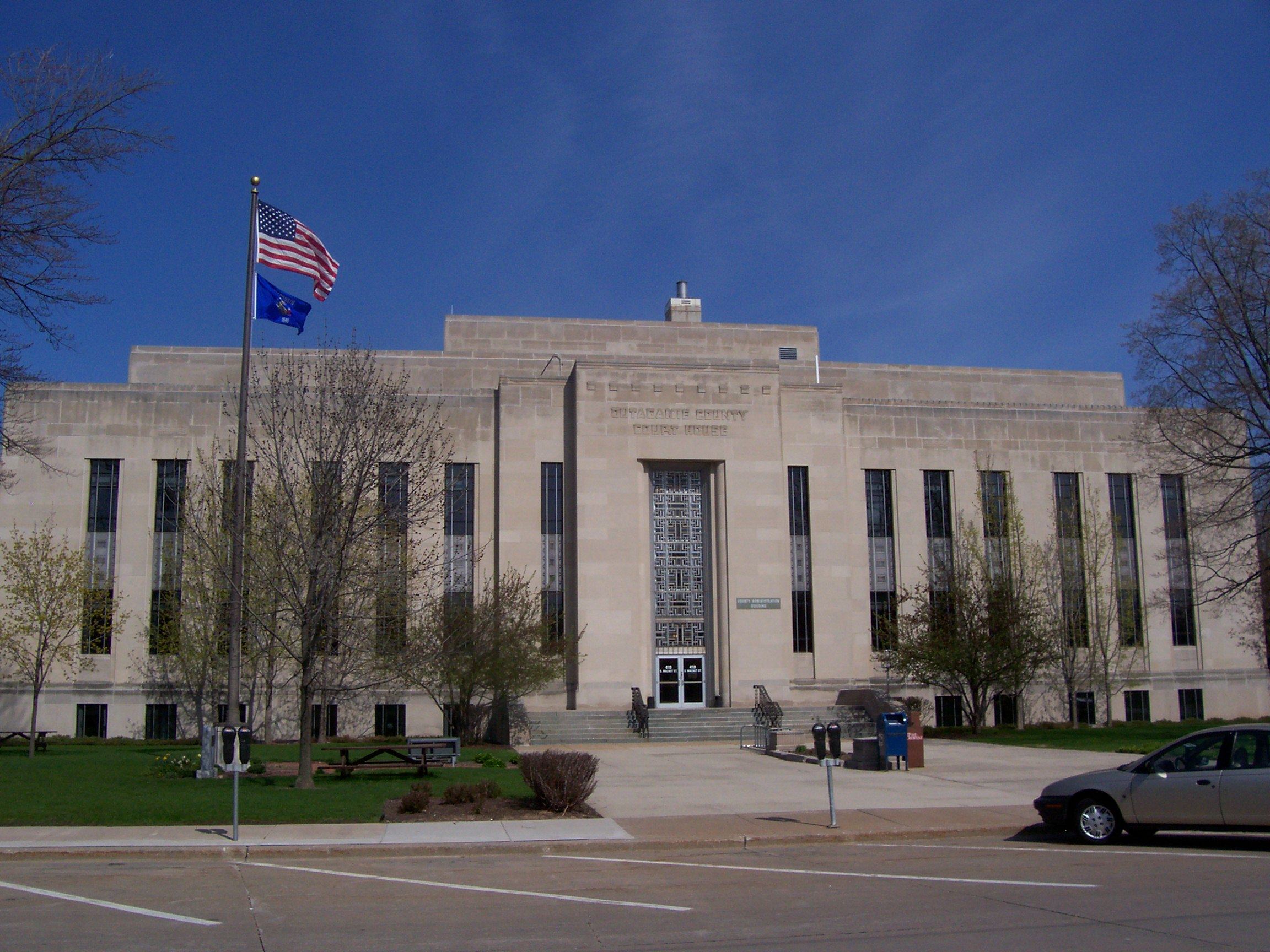
- Outagamie County Administration Complex

- Location within the U.S. state of Wisconsin
- Coordinates: 44°25′N 88°28′W
- Country: United States
- State: Wisconsin
- Founded: 1852
- Seat: Appleton
- Largest city: Appleton

Area
  - Total: 645 sq mi (1,670 km^{2})
  - Land: 638 sq mi (1,650 km^{2})
  - Water: 7.1 sq mi (18 km^{2}) 1.1%

Population (2020)
  - Total: 190,705
  - Estimate (2025): 195,894 ▲
  - Density: 299/sq mi (115/km^{2})
- Time zone: UTC−6 (Central)
  - Summer (DST): UTC−5 (CDT)
- Congressional district: 8th
- Website: www.outagamie.gov

Outagamie County (/ˌaʊtəˈɡeɪmi/ OW-tə-GAY-mee) is a county in the Fox Cities region of the U.S. state of Wisconsin, in the northeast of the state. As of the 2020 census, the population was 190,705. Its county seat is Appleton.

Outagamie County is part of the Appleton Metropolitan Statistical Area, which is itself part of the Appleton-Neenah-Oshkosh Combined Statistical Area. It was named for the historic Meskwaki (Fox) people.

== History ==
"Outagamie", a French transliteration of the Anishinaabe term for the Meskwaki (Fox) people, means "dwellers of the other shore" or "dwellers on the other side of the stream", referring to their historic habitation along the St. Lawrence River and south of the Great Lakes. They occupied considerable territory in Wisconsin before colonization. Outagamie County was created in 1851 and organized in 1852. Before that, it was under the jurisdiction of Brown County.

== Geography ==
According to the U.S. Census Bureau, the county has an area of 645 square miles (1,670 km^{2}), of which 638 square miles (1,650 km^{2}) is land and 7.1 square miles (18 km^{2}) (1.1%) is water.

=== Adjacent counties ===
- Shawano County - north
- Brown County - east
- Calumet County - southeast
- Winnebago County - southwest
- Waupaca County - west

=== Rivers ===
- Wolf River - The Wolf River runs through the city of New London and the village of Shiocton along western half of the county.
- Fox River - The Fox River follows the southeastern corner of the county, running through the cities of Appleton and Kaukauna
- Shioc River - This river runs merges with the Wolf River in the village of Shiocton.
- Embarrass River - The Embarrass River runs through the city of New London and merges with the Wolf River there.

=== Lakes ===
- Black Otter Lake - Located in Hortonville, it receives much recreational use by anglers as the county's only lake.

== Government ==
Outagamie County's government consists of an elected County Board of Supervisors, a County Executive, and 36 county agencies and departments.

=== County Executive ===
The county executive serves as its chief executive officer, participating in the legislative process with the County Board of Supervisors and exercising administrative authority and control over the county's operations, departments, offices, boards, programs, and communications.

Department heads are appointed by the county executive, subject to the approval of the board of supervisors. The county executive also appoints members to the county's boards and commissions. The county executive sets the annual budget in consultation with and subject to the approval of the board of supervisors.

County Executive Tom Nelson was first elected in 2011.

== Transportation ==
=== Major highways ===
- Interstate 41
- U.S. Highway 41
- U.S. Highway 45
- Wisconsin Highway 15
- Wisconsin Highway 29
- Wisconsin Highway 32
- Wisconsin Highway 47
- Wisconsin Highway 54
- Wisconsin Highway 55
- Wisconsin Highway 76
- Wisconsin Highway 96
- Wisconsin Highway 125
- Wisconsin Highway 187
- Wisconsin Highway 441

=== County Highways ===
- County A
- County AA
- County B
- County BB
- County C
- County CA
- County CB
- County CC
- County CE
- County D
- County DD
- County E
- County EE
- County F
- County FF
- County G
- County GG
- County GV
- County H
- County HH
- County I
- County J
- County JJ
- County K
- County KK
- County M
- County MM
- County N
- County NC
- County O
- County OO
- County P
- County PP
- County Q
- County S
- County T
- County TT
- County U
- County UU
- County VV
- County W
- County WW
- County X
- County XX
- County Y
- County Z
- County ZZ

=== Railroads ===
- Canadian National
- Watco

=== Buses ===
- Valley Transit (Wisconsin)

=== Airports ===
- Appleton International Airport (KATW) serves the county and surrounding communities. It is the third-busiest airport in Wisconsin and is served by four airlines to 16 destinations.
- Shiocton Airport (W34) is a grass strip airport in Shiocton, Wisconsin

== Demographics ==
Historical population
Census	Pop.	Note	%±
1860	9,587		—
1870	18,430		92.2%
1880	28,716		55.8%
1890	38,690		34.7%
1900	46,247		19.5%
1910	49,102		6.2%
1920	55,113		12.2%
1930	62,790		13.9%
1940	70,032		11.5%
1950	81,722		16.7%
1960	101,794		24.6%
1970	119,356		17.3%
1980	128,799		7.9%
1990	140,510		9.1%
2000	160,971		14.6%
2010	176,695		9.8%
2020	190,705		7.9%
2025 (est.)	195,894	▲	2.7%
U.S. Decennial Census; 1790–1960 1900–1990; 1990–2000 2010 2020

=== Racial and ethnic composition ===
Outagamie County, Wisconsin – Racial and ethnic composition Note: the US Census treats Hispanic/Latino as an ethnic category. This table excludes Latinos from the racial categories and assigns them to a separate category. Hispanics/Latinos may be of any race.
Race / Ethnicity (NH = Non-Hispanic)	Pop 1980	Pop 1990	Pop 2000	Pop 2010	Pop 2020	% 1980	% 1990	% 2000	% 2010	% 2020
White alone (NH)	125,656	135,505	149,644	158,366	161,879	97.56%	96.44%	92.96%	89.63%	84.88%
Black or African American alone (NH)	62	191	846	1,682	2,929	0.05%	0.14%	0.53%	0.95%	1.54%
Native American or Alaska Native alone (NH)	1,618	1,935	2,308	2,719	2,743	1.26%	1.38%	1.43%	1.54%	1.44%
Asian alone (NH)	351	1,865	3,564	5,208	6,588	0.27%	1.33%	2.21%	2.95%	3.45%
Native Hawaiian or Pacific Islander alone (NH)	x	x	51	55	112	x	x	0.03%	0.03%	0.06%
Other race alone (NH)	432	27	50	96	415	0.34%	0.02%	0.03%	0.05%	0.22%
Mixed race or Multiracial (NH)	x	x	1,301	2,210	6,616	x	x	0.81%	1.25%	3.47%
Hispanic or Latino (any race)	680	987	3,207	6,359	9,423	0.53%	0.70%	1.99%	3.60%	4.94%
Total	128,799	140,510	160,971	176,695	190,705	100.00%	100.00%	100.00%	100.00%	100.00%

=== 2020 census ===
As of the 2020 census, the population was 190,705. The median age was 38.8 years, with 23.3% of residents under the age of 18 and 15.7% of residents 65 years of age or older. For every 100 females there were 99.6 males, and for every 100 females age 18 and over there were 97.9 males age 18 and over.

The population density was 299.1 people per square mile (115.5 people/km^{2}). There were 79,131 housing units at an average density of 124.1 units per square mile (47.9 units/km^{2}). 74.6% of residents lived in urban areas, while 25.4% lived in rural areas. Among the housing units, 3.7% were vacant. Among occupied housing units, 70.0% were owner-occupied and 30.0% were renter-occupied. The homeowner vacancy rate was 0.8% and the rental vacancy rate was 4.0%.

The racial makeup of the county was 86.0% White, 1.6% Black or African American, 1.6% American Indian and Alaska Native, 3.5% Asian, 0.1% Native Hawaiian and Pacific Islander, 2.0% from some other race, and 5.3% from two or more races. Hispanic or Latino residents of any race comprised 4.9% of the population.

There were 76,237 households in the county, of which 29.9% had children under the age of 18 living in them. Of all households, 52.1% were married-couple households, 17.8% were households with a male householder and no spouse or partner present, and 22.3% were households with a female householder and no spouse or partner present. About 27.4% of all households were made up of individuals and 10.4% had someone living alone who was 65 years of age or older.

2000 Census Age Pyramid for Outagamie County

=== 2000 census ===
As of the census of 2000, there were 160,971 people, 60,530 households, and 42,189 families residing in the county. The population density was 251 people per square mile (97 people/km^{2}). There were 62,614 housing units at an average density of 98 units per square mile (38 units/km^{2}). The racial makeup of the county was 93.87% White, 0.54% Black or African American, 1.54% Native American, 2.23% Asian, 0.03% Pacific Islander, 0.81% from other races, and 0.98% from two or more races. 1.99% of the population were Hispanic or Latino of any race. 47.7% were of German, 9.4% Dutch, 6.2% Irish and 5.2% American and French-Canadian ancestry.

Of the 60,530 households, 36.00% had children under the age of 18 living with them, 58.90% were married couples living together, 7.60% had a female householder with no husband present, and 30.30% were non-families. 24.20% of all households were made up of individuals, and 8.40% had someone living alone who was 65 years of age or older. The average household size was 2.61 and the average family size was 3.14.

By age, 27.70% of the population was under 18, 8.90% from 18 to 24, 31.90% from 25 to 44, 20.70% from 45 to 64, and 10.90% were 65 or older. The median age was 34 years. For every 100 females there were 99.50 males. For every 100 females age 18 and over, there were 96.90 males.

In 2017, there were 2,204 births, giving a general fertility rate of 64.0 births per 1000 women aged 15–44, the 34th highest rate out of all 72 Wisconsin counties. Additionally, there were 136 reported induced abortions performed on women of Outagamie County residence in 2017.

== Communities ==
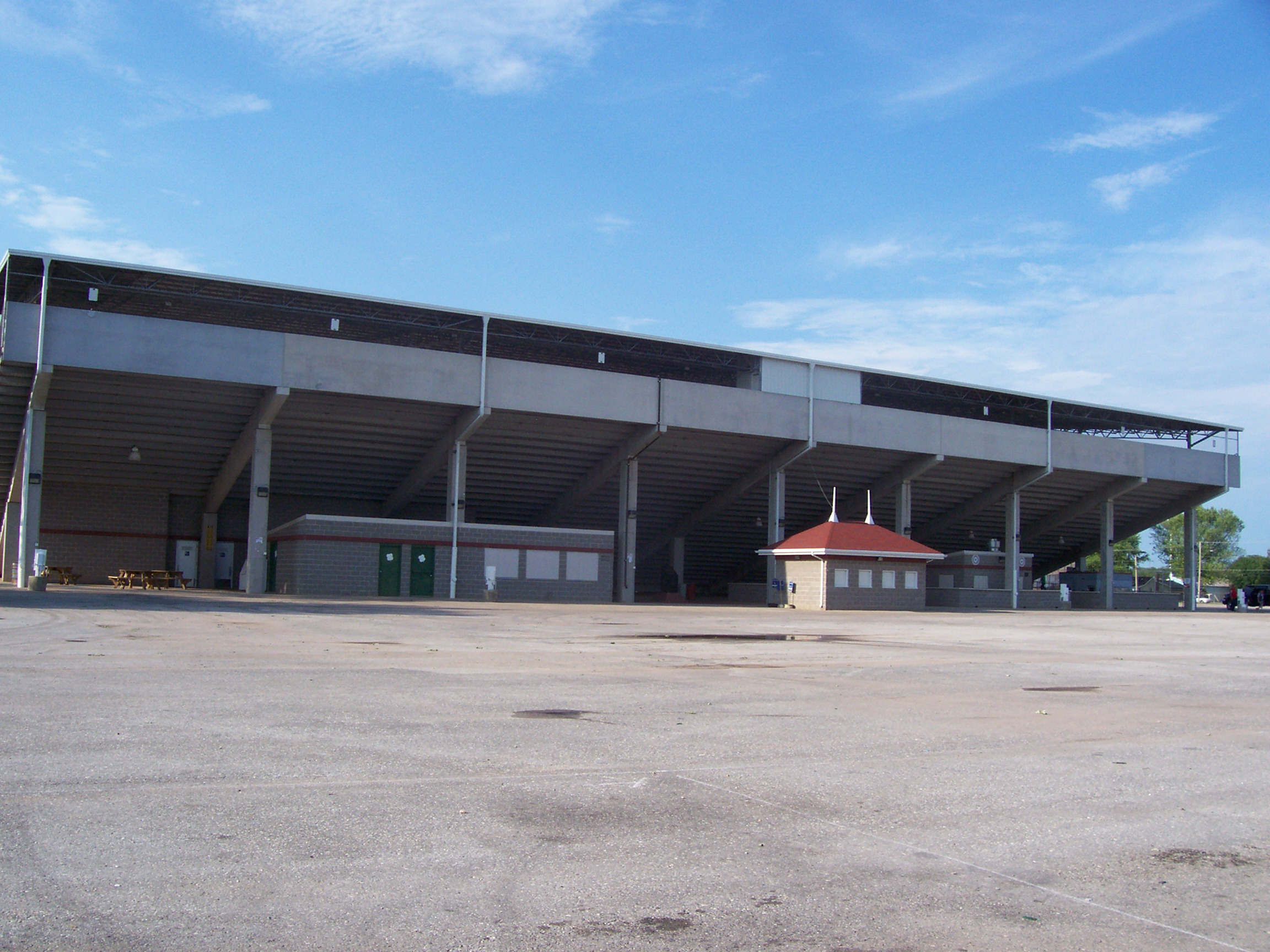
Outagamie County Fairgrounds grandstands in Seymour

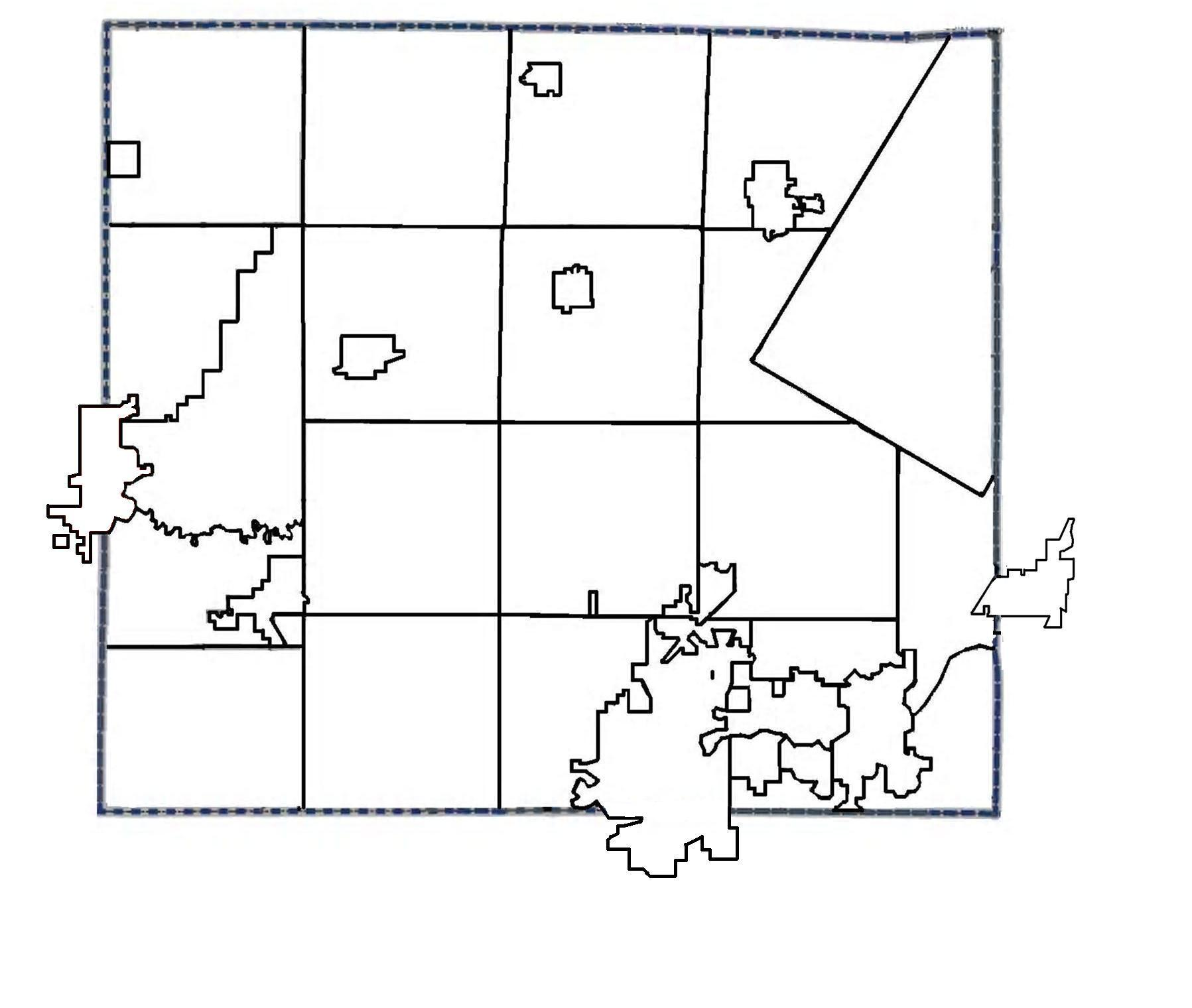
Municipality Boundaries in Outagamie County, Wisconsin

=== Cities ===
- Appleton (county seat; partly in Calumet County and Winnebago County)
- Kaukauna (partially in Calumet County)
- New London (mostly in Waupaca County)
- Seymour

=== Villages ===
- Bear Creek
- Black Creek
- Combined Locks
- Greenville
- Harrison (mostly in Calumet County)
- Hortonville
- Howard (mostly in Brown County)
- Kimberly
- Little Chute
- Nichols
- Shiocton
- Wrightstown (mostly in Brown County)

=== Towns ===
- Black Creek
- Bovina
- Buchanan
- Center
- Cicero
- Dale
- Deer Creek
- Ellington
- Freedom
- Grand Chute
- Hortonia
- Kaukauna
- Liberty
- Maine
- Maple Creek
- Oneida
- Osborn
- Seymour
- Vandenbroek

=== Census-designated place ===
- Dale

=== Unincorporated communities ===
- Apple Creek
- Binghamton
- Center Valley
- Chicago Corners
- Cicero
- Darboy
- Five Corners
- Freedom
- Greenville
- Hamples Corner
- Isaar
- Leeman
- Mackville
- Medina
- Murphy Corner
- Oneida
- Sniderville (partial)
- Stephensville
- Sugar Bush
- Twelve Corners

=== Ghost towns/neighborhoods ===
- Grand Chute
- Lawesburg
- Lime Rock
- Wakefield

=== Native American community ===
- Oneida Nation of Wisconsin (partial)

== Politics ==
United States presidential election results for Outagamie County, Wisconsin
Year	Republican		Democratic		Third party(ies)	
Year	No.	%	No.	%	No.	%
1892	2,733	35.91%	4,545	59.72%	333	4.38%
1896	5,433	55.42%	4,096	41.78%	275	2.80%
1900	5,245	55.15%	4,008	42.14%	258	2.71%
1904	5,949	63.65%	3,143	33.63%	254	2.72%
1908	5,079	52.34%	4,286	44.17%	339	3.49%
1912	2,384	28.82%	4,139	50.04%	1,748	21.13%
1916	5,302	52.97%	4,442	44.38%	265	2.65%
1920	11,140	74.69%	3,121	20.93%	654	4.38%
1924	6,426	35.39%	1,255	6.91%	10,479	57.70%
1928	12,378	49.58%	12,474	49.97%	112	0.45%
1932	8,517	33.91%	16,186	64.44%	415	1.65%
1936	9,485	34.66%	16,163	59.07%	1,716	6.27%
1940	17,733	58.98%	12,168	40.47%	166	0.55%
1944	18,294	64.44%	9,955	35.07%	140	0.49%
1948	16,161	58.40%	11,233	40.59%	278	1.00%
1952	26,603	73.86%	9,373	26.02%	44	0.12%
1956	26,090	76.56%	7,725	22.67%	262	0.77%
1960	24,146	58.15%	17,287	41.63%	89	0.21%
1964	18,595	46.26%	21,556	53.62%	47	0.12%
1968	25,080	59.29%	14,224	33.63%	2,997	7.08%
1972	27,533	59.84%	17,447	37.92%	1,028	2.23%
1976	28,363	54.02%	23,079	43.95%	1,065	2.03%
1980	31,500	52.99%	21,284	35.81%	6,657	11.20%
1984	36,773	64.54%	19,790	34.73%	416	0.73%
1988	33,113	54.04%	27,771	45.32%	394	0.64%
1992	30,370	41.65%	23,735	32.55%	18,806	25.79%
1996	27,758	42.78%	28,815	44.41%	8,316	12.82%
2000	39,460	52.10%	32,735	43.22%	3,547	4.68%
2004	48,903	54.31%	40,169	44.61%	978	1.09%
2008	39,677	43.33%	50,294	54.93%	1,592	1.74%
2012	47,372	50.08%	45,659	48.27%	1,565	1.65%
2016	49,879	53.10%	38,068	40.53%	5,986	6.37%
2020	58,385	54.05%	47,667	44.13%	1,970	1.82%
2024	60,827	54.34%	49,438	44.17%	1,667	1.49%

Outagamie County has voted for the Republican presidential nominee in 19 of the last 22 elections.

== See also ==
- National Register of Historic Places listings in Outagamie County, Wisconsin
