= Senator Culbertson =

Senator Culbertson may refer to:

- Henry N. Culbertson (1860–1943), Wisconsin State Senate
- William Wirt Culbertson (1835–1911), Kentucky State Senate

== See also ==
- Charles Allen Culberson (1855–1925), U.S. Senator from Texas from 1899 to 1923
- David B. Culberson (1830–1900), Texas State Senate
