= Stephensville, Wisconsin =

- Unincorporated community
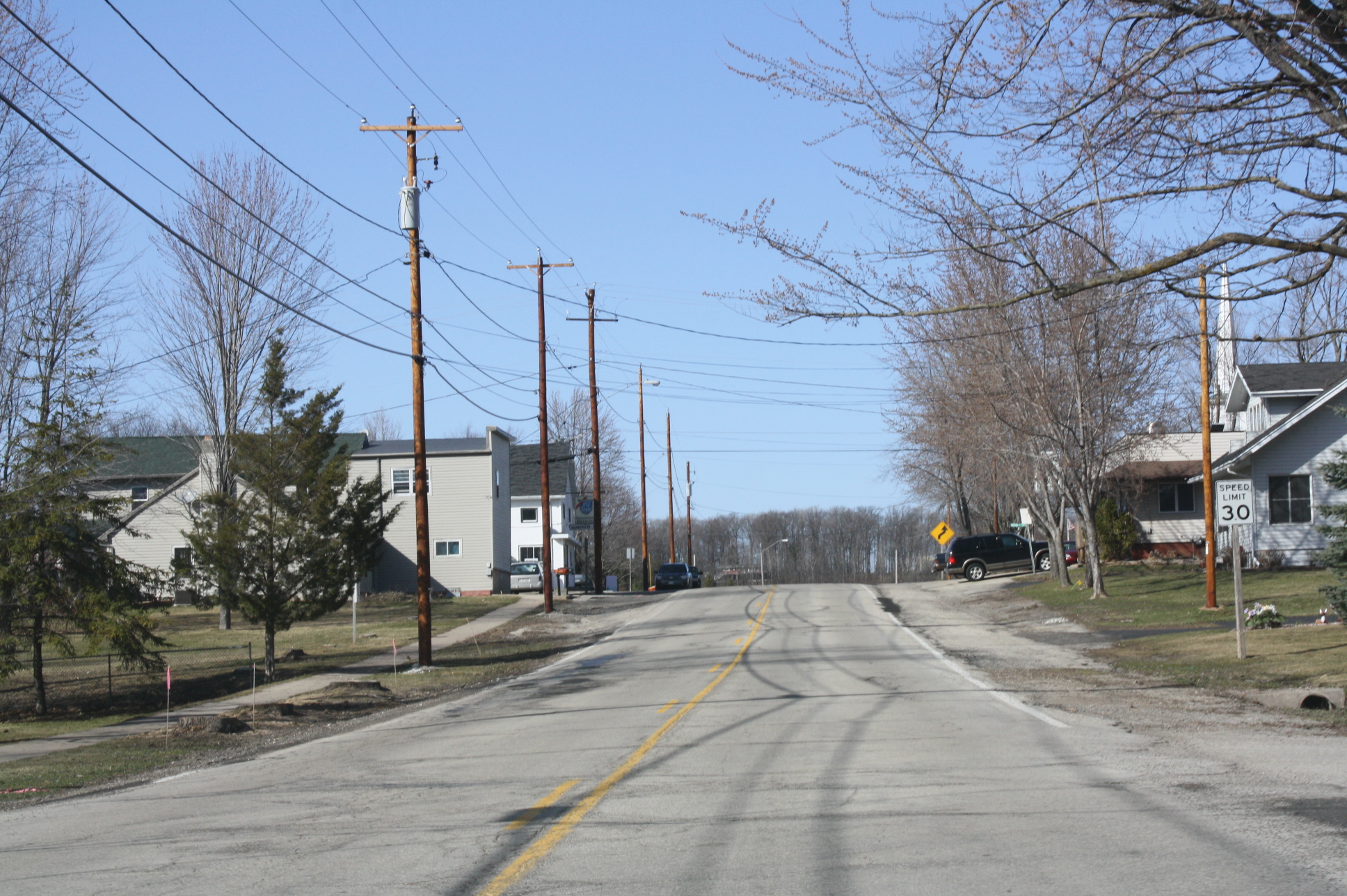
- Downtown Stephensville

- Location within Wisconsin Location within the United States
- Coordinates: 44°22′24″N 88°35′3″W
- Country: United States
- State: Wisconsin
- County: Outagamie
- Town: Ellington
- Elevation: 830 ft (250 m)
- Time zone: UTC-6 (Central (CST))
  - Summer (DST): UTC-5 (CDT)
- Area code: 920

Stephensville is a small unincorporated community located entirely within the town of Ellington in west-central Outagamie County, Wisconsin, United States. Stephensville is classified as a Class U6 Community by the USGS, being a populated place located wholly or substantially outside the boundaries of any incorporated place or CDP with a recognized authoritative common name.

Stephensville is located four miles northeast of Hortonville, seven miles northwest of Greenville, five miles south of Shiocton and 15 miles northwest of Appleton.

Bear Creek passes through the community just east of where it empties into the Wolf River.

Mail is delivered by the Hortonville post office.

== Geography ==
Stephensville is located at 44°22′24″N 88°35′3″W (44.3733170, -88.5842708), and the elevation is 804 feet (245 m).

== Education ==
Stephensville is located within the Hortonville Area School District.

== Transportation ==
Stephensville is located on Wisconsin Highway 76. Outagamie County Highways S and MM also enter the community. Because of its scenic nature, Outagamie County Highway MM has been classified as a Rustic Road (Route 61) from Stephensville to Hortonville.

== Worship ==
Saint Patrick Catholic Church and Saint Paul Evangelical Lutheran Church are located within the community.

== Images ==
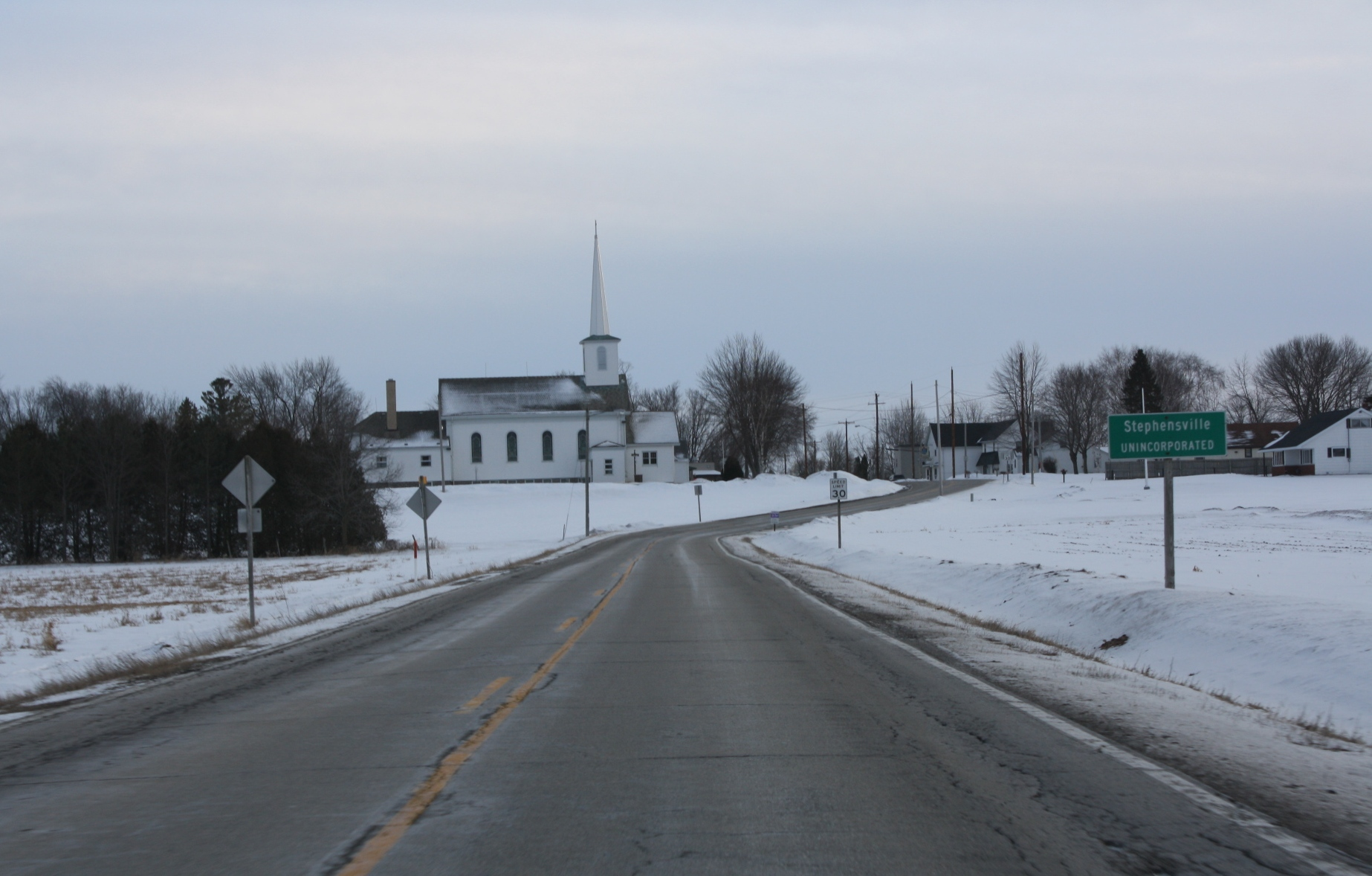
Looking south at Stephensville

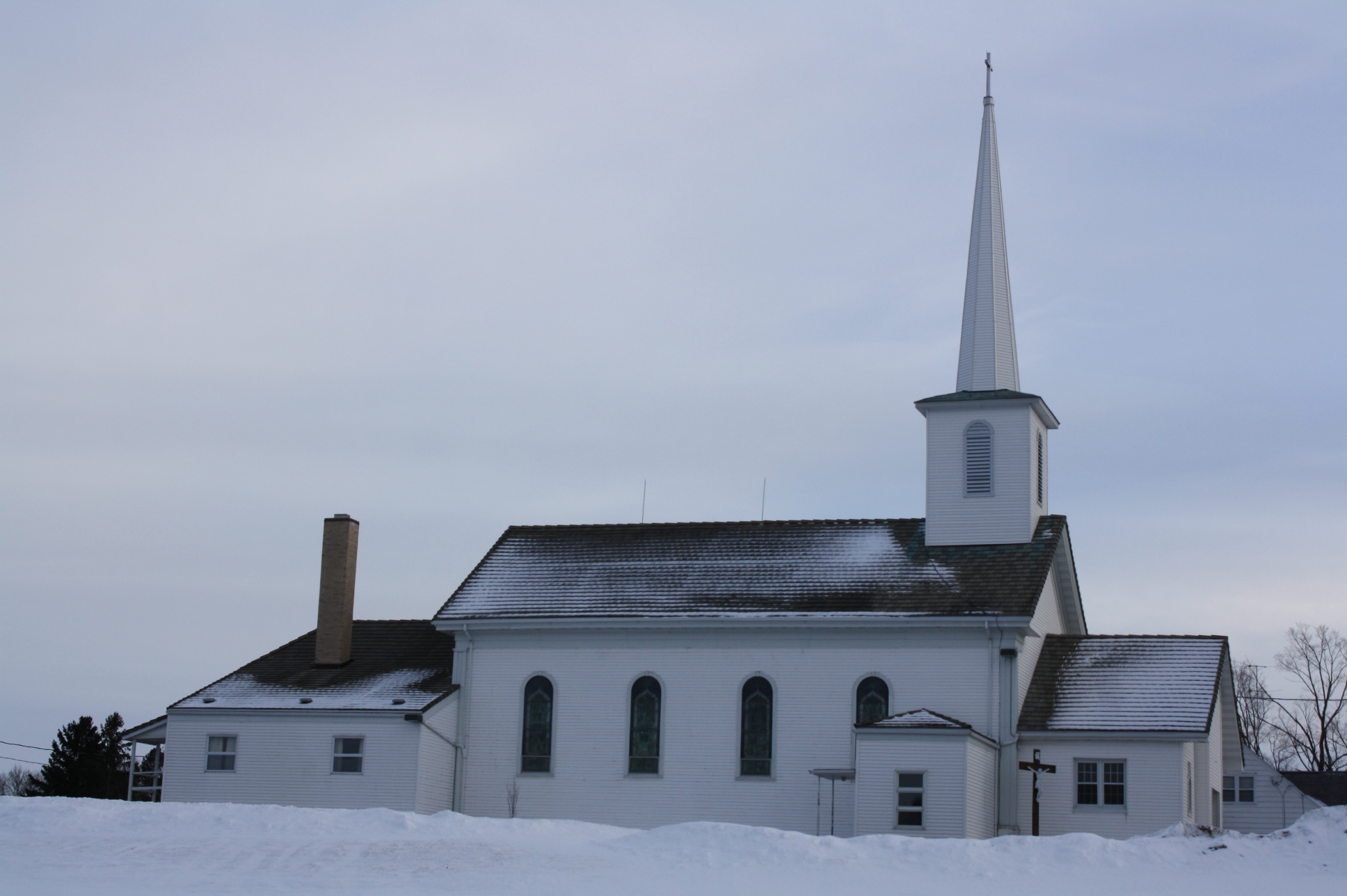
Catholic Church

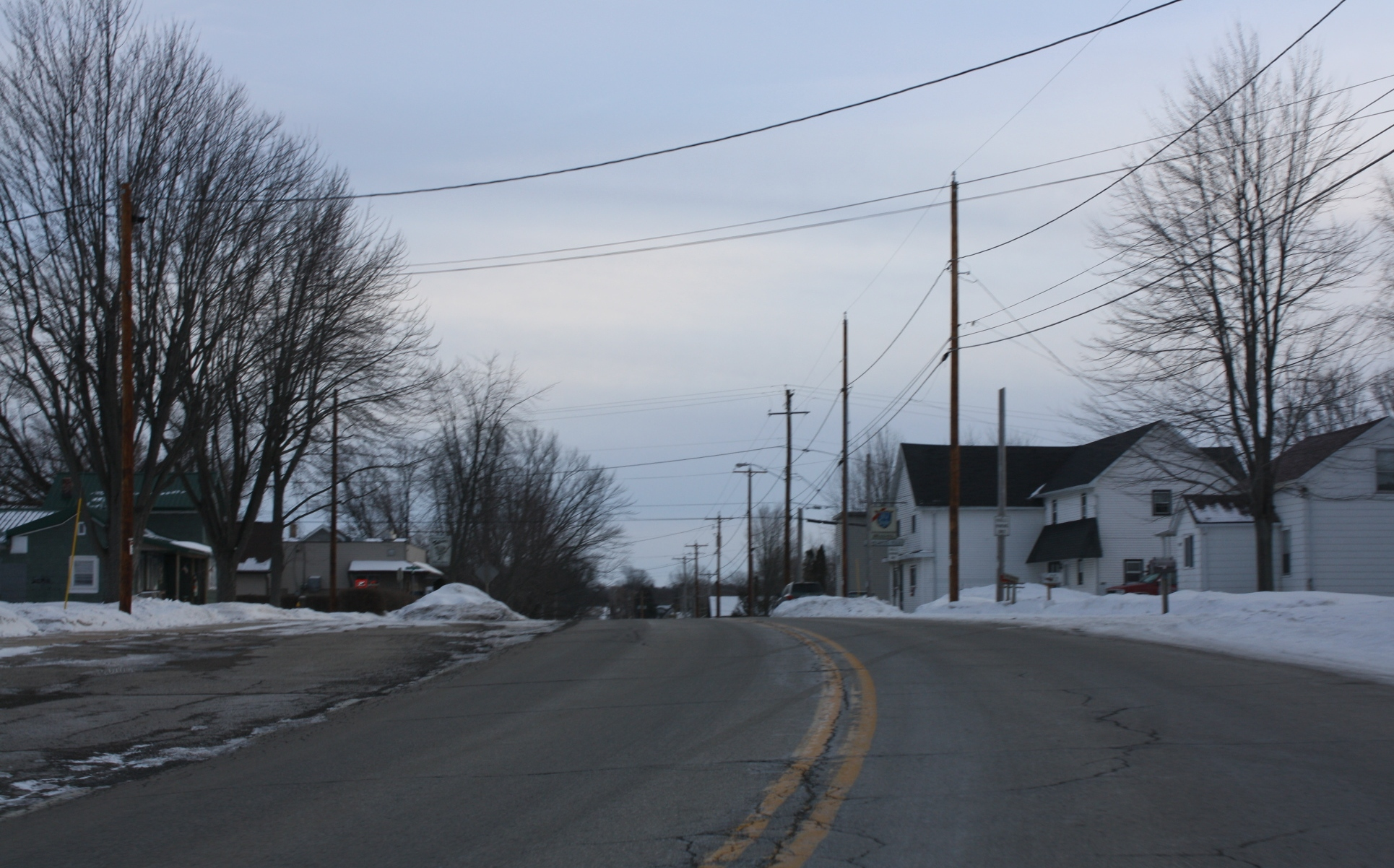
Looking south at downtown Stephensville
