= Burt W. Rynders =

American politician

- Born: February 3, 1871; Ellington, Wisconsin
- Died: January 23, 1935 (aged 63)
- Occupations: American politician, educator, and businessman
- Title: Democrat in the Wisconsin State Assembly (1921)

Burt W. Rynders (February 3, 1871 – January 23, 1935) was an American politician, educator, and businessman.

Born in Ellington, Wisconsin, Rynders went to school in Hortonville, Wisconsin and Oshkosh Normal School. He taught school, and was in the real estate and insurance business in Antigo, Wisconsin. Rynders also operated a hotel. Rynders served on the Antigo Common Council and as mayor. He was also president of the Antigo Police and Fire Commission. In 1921, Rynders served in the Wisconsin State Assembly and was a Democrat. Rynders died in Madison, Wisconsin in 1935.
