= Hortonville Area School District =

School district in Wisconsin, USA

Coordinates: 44°20′14″N 88°38′03″W

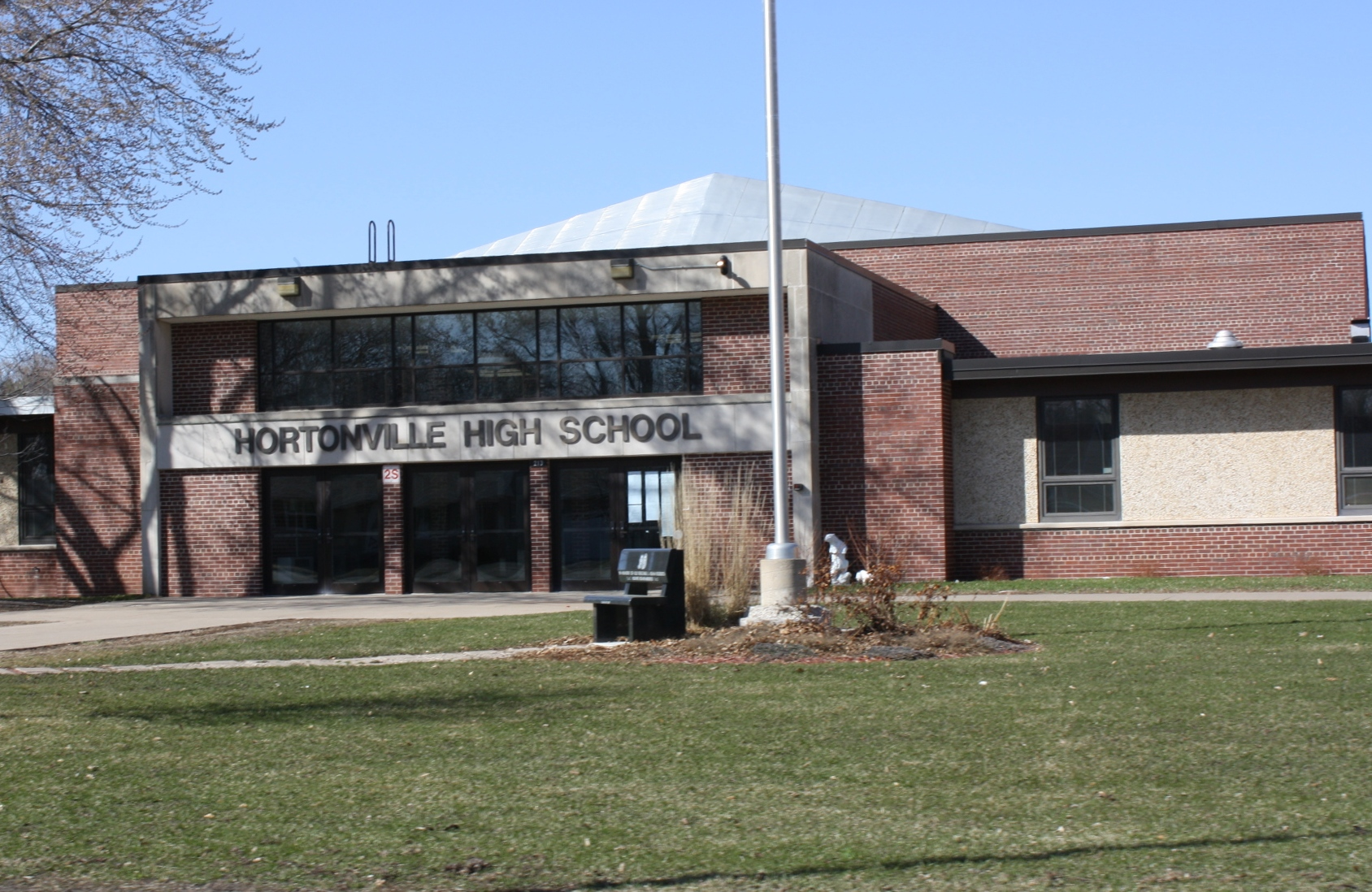

Location
- Hortonville, Wisconsin, Greenville, Wisconsin & Surrounding Towns

District information
- Type: Public
- Grades: PK-12
- Superintendent: Dr. Heidi Schmidt

Students and staff
- Students: 3,555

Other information
- Website: http://www.hasd.org/

The Hortonville Area School District (HASD) is a school district in the U.S. state of Wisconsin. It serves the communities of Hortonville and Greenville, and parts of Center, Dale, Ellington, Grand Chute, Hortonia, and Liberty. As of 2012, the district enrollment was 3,555. The district maintains six school buildings on three campuses. Total district population was 18,952 at the 2010 Census.

== Schools ==
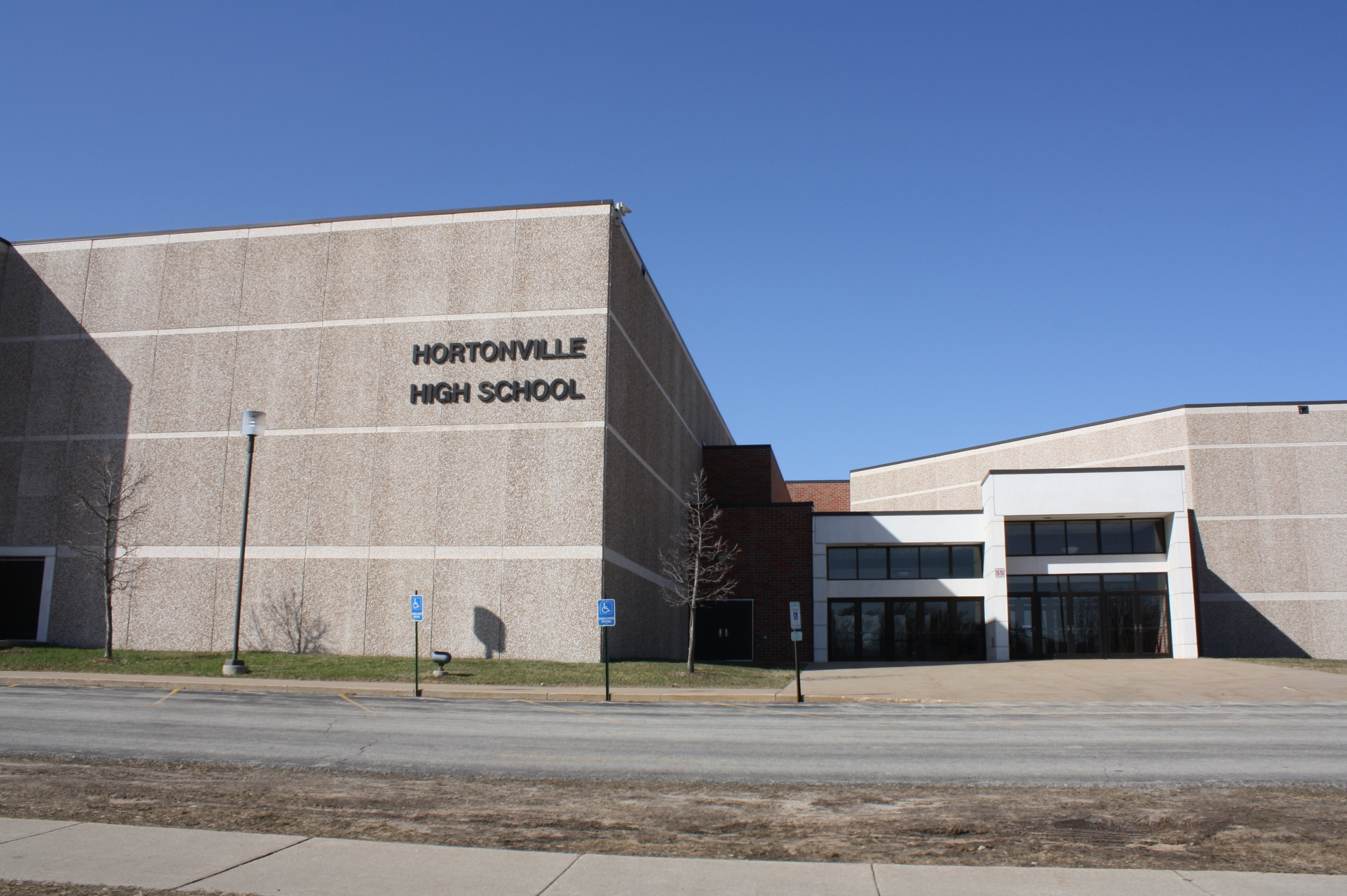

=== K4 Schools ===
HASD provides 4-year-old kindergarten at sites throughout the community. Sites include:

- Fox West YMCA
- Hillside Preschool
- Hortonville Elementary School
- North Greenville Elementary School
- Play and Grow Learning Center
- St. Edward School

=== Elementary schools ===
- Greenville Elementary School
- Hortonville Elementary School
- North Greenville Elementary School

=== Middle schools ===
- Greenville Middle School
- Hortonville Middle School
- Fox West Academy (Grades 6–8) (charter school)

=== High school ===
- Hortonville High School

== History ==
During the 1972-1974 school years, teachers belonging to the Hortonville Education Association (Note: After the Hortonville Education Association losses, until 2003, when teachers in the Hortonville district were admitted to a national union, a non-affiliated local union, Hortonville Association of Teachers (HAT), was the bargaining association. They are now affiliated with the American Federation of Teachers.) went on strike against the Hortonville School District. Strikes by teachers were illegal under state law. The 84 striking teachers were replaced by strikebreakers and classes resumed. The union took the firings by the school board to court, asserting that the disciplinary hearings held by the Hortonville Board of Education were prejudiced because of the board's role as the bargaining unit for the district.

The case went to the Wisconsin Supreme Court, which found for the Hortonville Education Association, reversing Wisconsin lower courts, which had found for the school board.

The case, Hortonville Joint School District No. 1 v. Hortonville Education Association, went to the United States Supreme Court. In a 6–3 decision authored by Chief Justice Warren E. Burger, the court found the board had held the power to discipline the teachers under state law, and further that the action was in the best interests of the community, in providing continued education for the charges of the board, the students.
