= Dale (CDP), Wisconsin =

Census-designated place in Wisconsin, United States

Dale
- Census-designated place
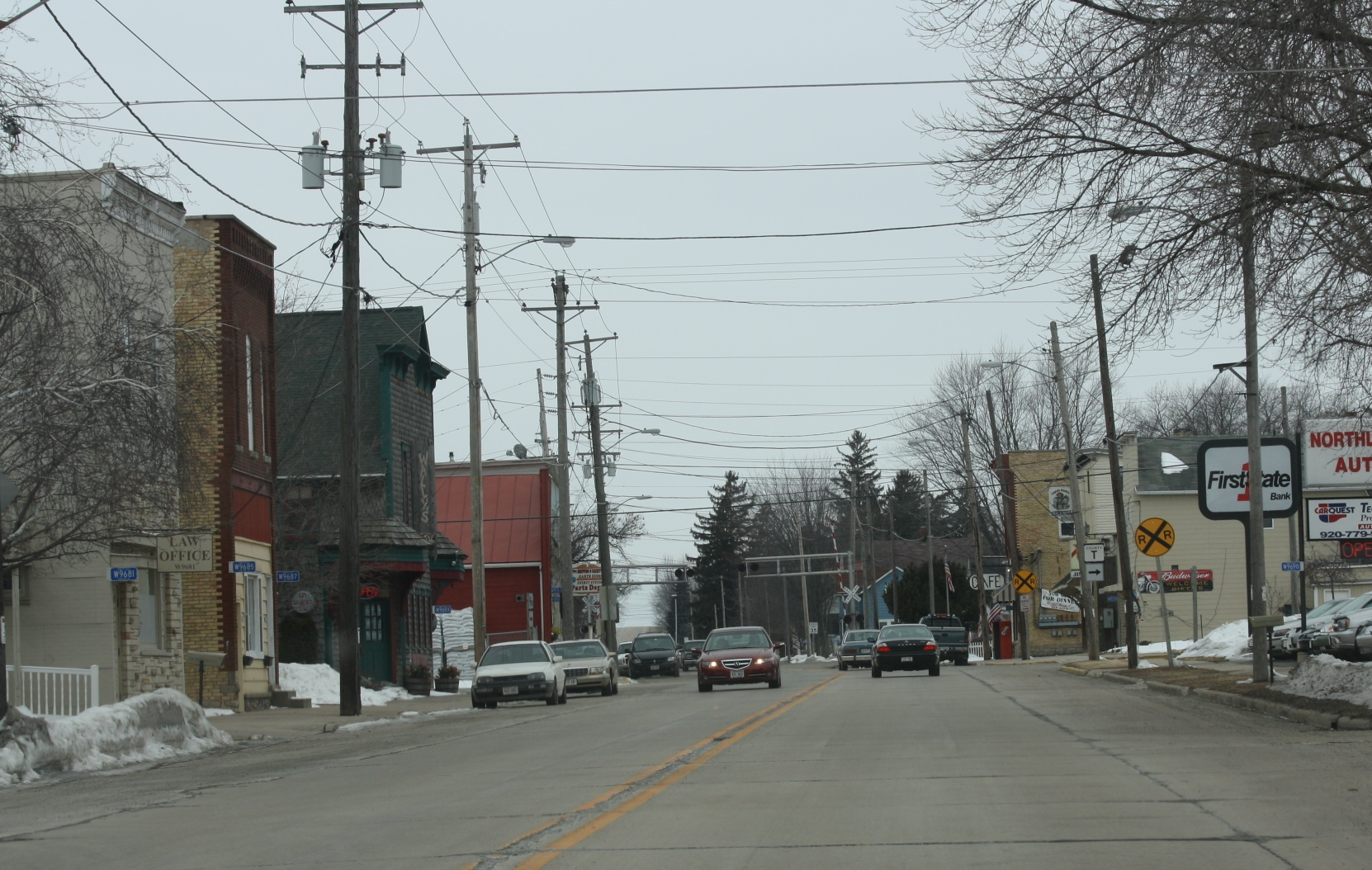
- Downtown Dale
- Interactive map of Dale
- Coordinates: 44°16′23″N 88°40′42″W
- Country: United States
- State: Wisconsin
- County: Outagamie

Area
  - Total: 1.492 sq mi (3.86 km^{2})
  - Land: 1.492 sq mi (3.86 km^{2})
  - Water: 0 sq mi (0 km^{2})
- Elevation: 814 ft (248 m)

Population (2020)
  - Total: 570
  - Density: 380/sq mi (150/km^{2})
- Time zone: UTC-6 (Central (CST))
  - Summer (DST): UTC-5 (CDT)
- ZIP Codes: 54931
- Area code: 920
- FIPS code: Class Code U6
- GNIS feature ID: 1563669

Dale is an unincorporated census-designated place in the town of Dale in Outagamie County, Wisconsin, United States. It is located at the intersection of Wisconsin Highway 96 and County T. As of the 2020 census, its population was 570, up from 528 at the 2010 census.

== History ==
Settlers who would plat the land comprising the community of Dale arrived between 1851 and 1853, and approximately twenty families arrived between the fall of 1853 and June 1854, establishing a solid population. Dale was founded and platted along the proposed Manitowoc and Mississippi Railroad line, which consolidated with the Wisconsin Central Railroad in 1871. Rail construction on the right of way by the Wisconsin Central reached Dale in 1872.

Early in its history, the community was called Poker Flat in addition to Dale, for what a 1923 newspaper article terms "an unknown reason".

=== 20th century ===
Dale was on the original path of the transcontinental Yellowstone Trail auto trail, established in 1915. This highway through Dale was first given the numerical designation State Trunk Highway 18 in 1917, which in turn was changed to U.S. Route 10 in 1926.

Dale had a three-room school run by the New London school district, which housed K-3 education through the late 1960s. The school was closed by fall 1969. Students who did go to Dale School were bussed to nearby Readfield School after the closure, and the property was sold to the Zion United Church of Christ in November 1969.

On September 3, 1974, one of three contractors installing curb and gutter pulled a gas line apart under Dale's Appleton State Bank, while digging a storm sewer trench with a backhoe. Natural gas leaked into the basement of the bank, and caused an explosion at 12:50 pm. An assistant bank manager who was preparing to re-open the bank for business hours was flung from the building by the force of the blast, and died of head and chest injuries five hours after the blast. Another person in a nearby building suffered two broken legs and a shoulder injury.

The explosion destroyed the bank building and Dale's post office, situated next door to the bank. Postal service was temporarily run out of Dale's town hall, and Appleton State Bank business out of a trailer, until both could have new buildings constructed.

=== 21st century ===
On December 5, 2003, the primary route through Dale changed designation from U.S. Route 10 to Wisconsin Highway 96, when new divided highway for US 10 between Greenville and Fremont was completed.

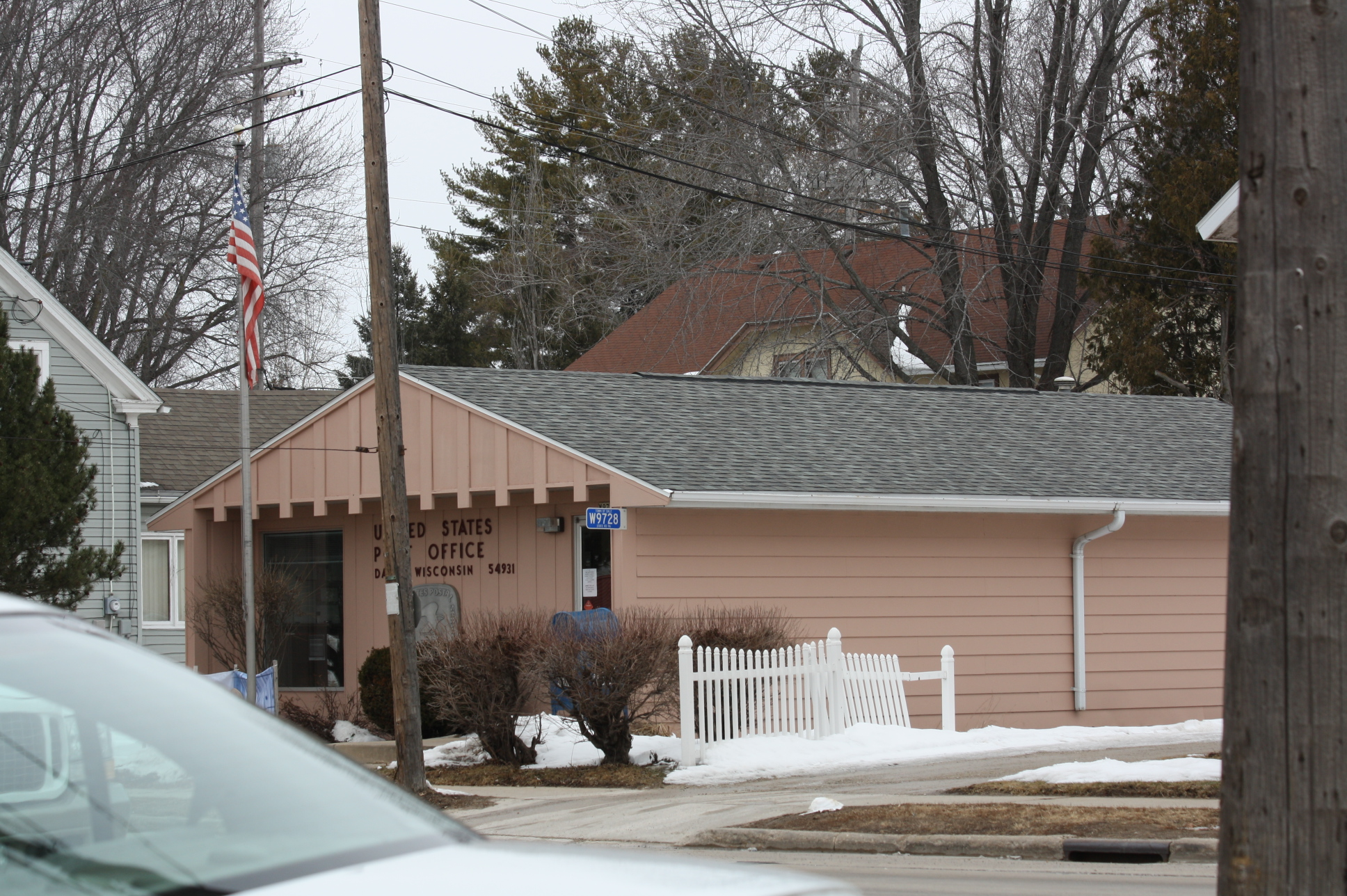
Post office, constructed 1974

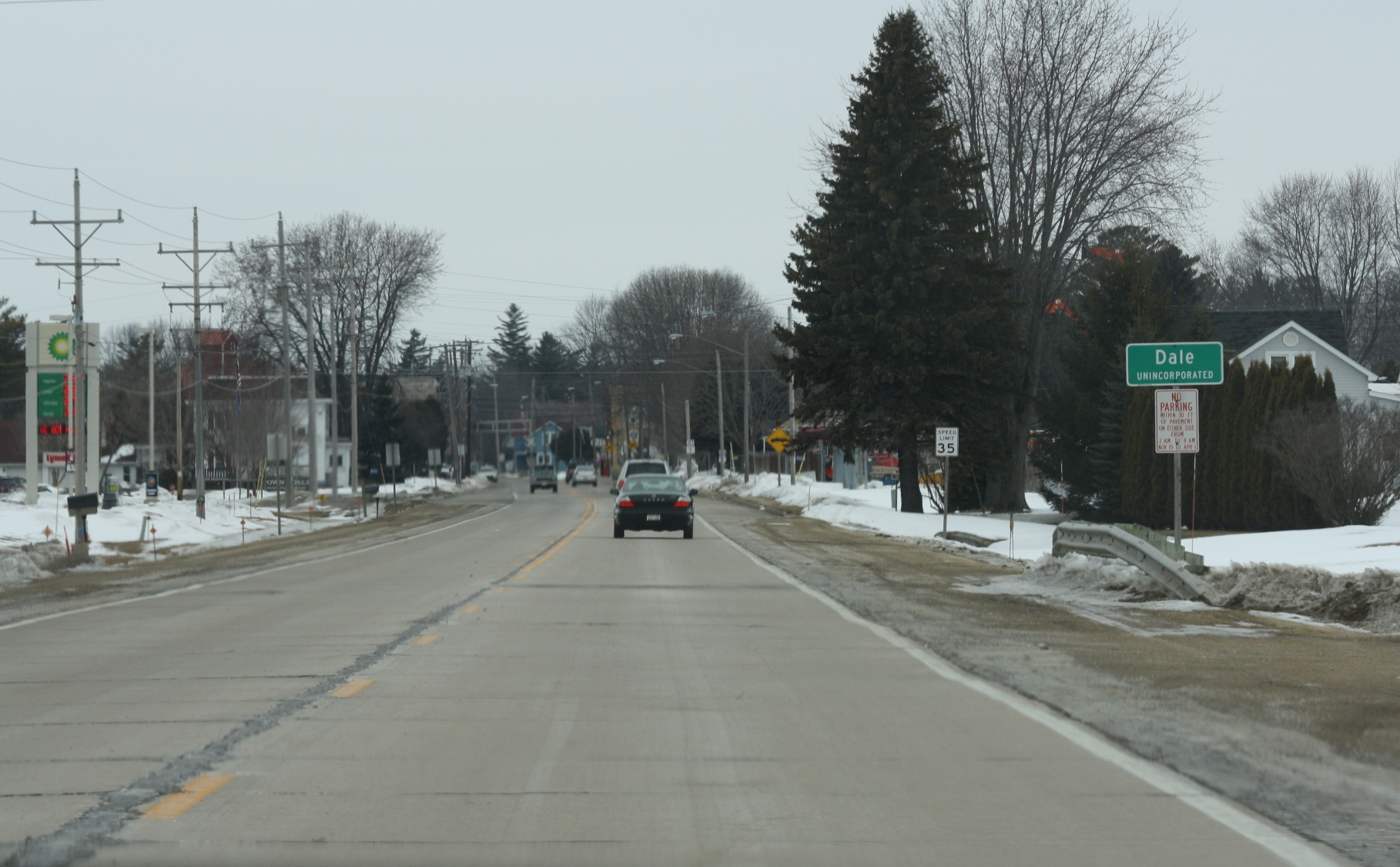
Entrance sign

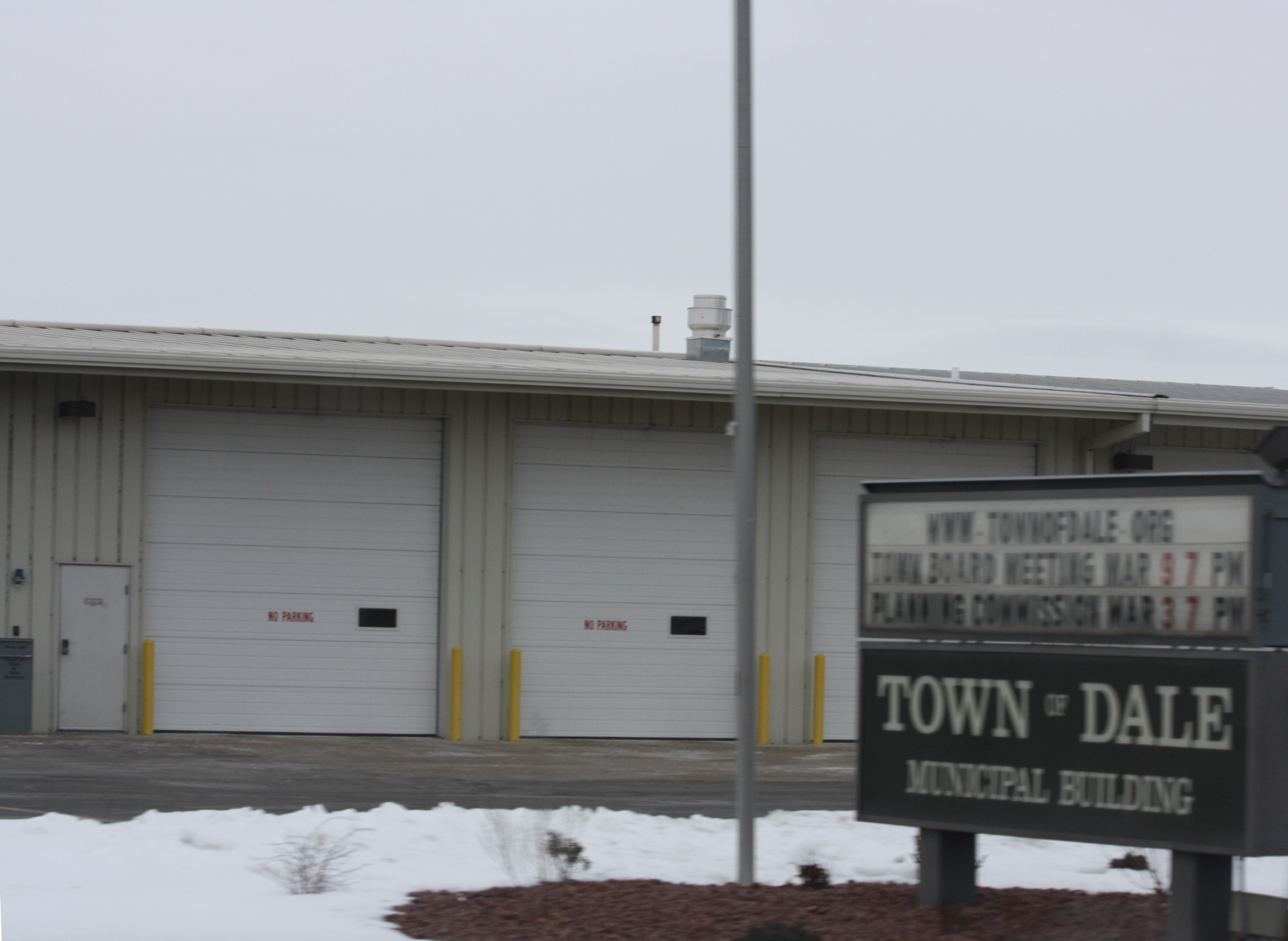
Town hall for the town of Dale
