= William H. H. Wroe =

19th century American politician and businessman

W. H. H. Wroe

Member of the Wisconsin State Assembly from the Outagamie–Shawano–Waupaca 1st district
- In office January 1, 1872 – January 6, 1873
- Preceded by: District established
- Succeeded by: John A. Roemer

Personal details
- Born: June 14, 1831 New York, New York, U.S.
- Died: August 6, 1897 (aged 66) Antigo, Wisconsin, U.S.
- Cause of death: Diabetes
- Resting place: Medina, Outagamie County, Wisconsin
- Party: Republican
- Spouse: married twice
- Children: Mrs. W. L. Crocker; Mrs. J. K. Smolk; Mrs. F. H. Cole; W. H. Wroe

William Henry Harrison Wroe (June 14, 1831 – August 6, 1897) was an American businessman and Republican politician. He served one term in the Wisconsin State Assembly, representing southern Outagamie County.

== Biography ==
Wroe was born on June 14, 1831, in New York City. Later, he settled in Geneva, Wisconsin, before moving to Medina, Outagamie County, Wisconsin. He was a merchant by trade. He was a member of the Assembly in 1872. In addition, he was Treasurer and Postmaster of Medina and a justice of the peace. He was a Republican.

Wroe suffered from diabetes for several years and died at Antigo, Wisconsin, in 1897.

Wisconsin State Assembly
District created	Member of the Wisconsin State Assembly from the Outagamie–Shawano–Waupaca 1st district January 1, 1872 – January 6, 1873	Succeeded by John A. Roemer
