= Lorenzo E. Darling =

American politician

Lorenzo E. Darling (August 9, 1829 – December 23, 1895) was a member of the Wisconsin State Assembly.

== Biography ==
Darling was born on August 9, 1829, in Warren Township, Bradford County, Pennsylvania. After residing in East Troy (town), Wisconsin, he moved to Greenville, Wisconsin, in 1849 and later to Appleton, Wisconsin, Ellington, Wisconsin, and Shiocton, Wisconsin.

In 1854, Darling married Mary E. Morse. They had three children. He died on December 23, 1895.

== Career ==
Darling was elected to the Assembly in 1873. He had previously been an unsuccessful candidate for the Assembly in 1864 and for the Wisconsin State Senate in 1868. Other positions Darling held include county clerk and member of the board of supervisors of Outagamie County, Wisconsin. He was a Republican.
