= Caleb Boushley =

American baseball player (born 1993)

KT Wiz – No. 36
- Pitcher
- Born: October 1, 1993 (age 32); Hortonville, Wisconsin, U.S.
- Bats: Right Throws: Right

Professional debut
- MLB: September 29, 2023, for the Milwaukee Brewers
- KBO: March 31, 2026, for the KT Wiz

MLB statistics (through 2025 season)
- Win–loss record: 1–0
- Earned run average: 5.80
- Strikeouts: 47

KBO statistics (through May 31, 2026)
- Win–loss record: 7-3
- Earned run average: 3.16
- Strikeouts: 56
- Stats at Baseball Reference

Teams
- Milwaukee Brewers (2023); Minnesota Twins (2024); Texas Rangers (2025); KT Wiz (2026–present)

Caleb John Boushley (born October 1, 1993) is an American professional baseball pitcher for the KT Wiz of the KBO League. He has previously played in Major League Baseball (MLB) for the Milwaukee Brewers, Minnesota Twins, and Texas Rangers.

== Career ==
=== Amateur career ===
Boushley attended Hortonville High School in Hortonville, Wisconsin. He enrolled at the University of Wisconsin–La Crosse in La Crosse, Wisconsin, where he played baseball for the Wisconsin–La Crosse Eagles.

=== San Diego Padres ===
The San Diego Padres selected Boushley in the 33rd round, with the 978th overall selection, of the 2017 Major League Baseball draft. He began his professional baseball career in 2017 playing for the rookie-level Arizona League Padres and High–A Lake Elsinore Storm. He spent some time at Lake Elsinore in 2018 but played the majority of the season with the Single–A Fort Wayne TinCaps. He also made one relief appearance for the Triple-A El Paso Chihuahuas. Boushley spent the entire 2019 season with Lake Elsinore, and he was selected to play in the 2019 California League All-Star Game.

Boushley did not play in a game in 2020 due to the cancellation of the minor league season because of the COVID-19 pandemic. In 2021, he began the season with the Double-A San Antonio Missions but was promoted to Triple-A El Paso in late June.

=== Milwaukee Brewers ===
On December 8, 2021, Boushley was selected by the Milwaukee Brewers in the minor league phase of the Rule 5 draft. He spent the 2022 season with the Triple–A Nashville Sounds, starting 25 games and posting a 12–2 record and 3.25 ERA with 91 strikeouts across 127 1/3 innings pitched. He returned to Nashville in 2023, making 29 appearances (26 starts) and logging a 9–8 record and 5.11 ERA with a career–high 110 strikeouts across 135 2/3 innings of work.

The Brewers selected Boushley's contract from Nashville on September 29, 2023, and he made his major league debut that night. Pitching against the Chicago Cubs, he struck out five batters while allowing one hit and one earned run in 2 1/3 innings pitched to earn the win. Following the season on October 31, Boushley was removed from the 40–man roster and sent outright to Triple–A Nashville. He elected free agency on November 6.

=== Minnesota Twins ===
On January 26, 2024, Boushley signed a minor league contract with the Minnesota Twins. On May 1, after 5 starts for the Triple–A St. Paul Saints, Boushley was added to Minnesota's major league roster. He made one appearance, allowing two runs in two innings of relief against the Washington Nationals. Boushley was designated for assignment by the Twins on July 14. He cleared waivers and was sent outright to St. Paul on July 16. He had his contract selected to the major league roster again on August 27. He was designated for assignment again on September 1. Boushley cleared waivers and was sent outright to St. Paul on September 3. He elected free agency on October 11.

=== Texas Rangers ===
On November 15, 2024, Boushley signed a minor league contract with the Texas Rangers. After two starts for the Triple-A Round Rock Express, the Rangers added Boushley to their active roster on April 8, 2025. On May 30, Boushley recorded his first career save after tossing three inning of relief in a victory over the St. Louis Cardinals. In 24 appearances for Texas, he recorded a 5.74 ERA with 39 strikeouts across 42 1/3 innings pitched. Boushley was designated for assignment by the Rangers on September 7.

=== Tampa Bay Rays ===
On September 9, 2025, Boushley was claimed off waivers by the Tampa Bay Rays. In three appearances for the Triple-A Durham Bulls, he recorded a 5.19 ERA with six strikeouts across 8 2/3 innings pitched. Boushley was designated for assignment by the Rays on November 3. He cleared waivers and elected free agency on November 6.

=== KT Wiz ===
On November 26, 2025, Boushley signed a one-year, $900,000 contract with the KT Wiz of the KBO League.
