= Medina, Outagamie County, Wisconsin =

Medina, Wisconsin
- Unincorporated community
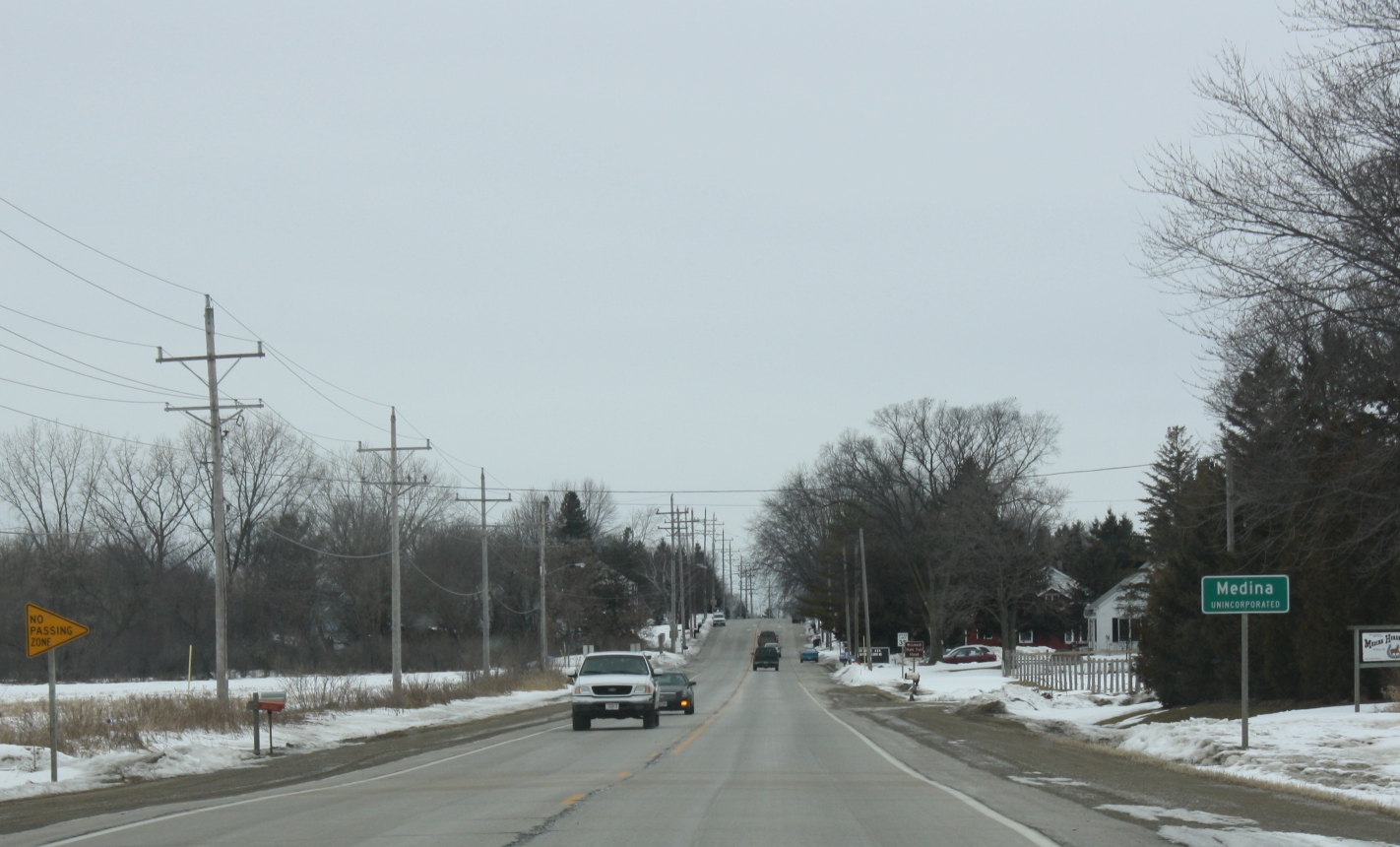
- Looking west at the sign for Medina on WIS 96

- Location within Wisconsin Location within the United States
- Coordinates: 44°16′22″N 88°38′16″W
- Country: United States
- State: Wisconsin
- County: Outagamie
- Town: Dale
- Elevation: 820 ft (250 m)
- Time zone: UTC-6 (Central (CST))
  - Summer (DST): UTC-5 (CDT)

Medina, originally Young's Corner, is an unincorporated community in the Town of Dale in southwestern Outagamie County, Wisconsin, United States. It is located 3.5 miles (5.6 km) south of the village of Hortonville, 11 miles (18 km) west of Appleton, and 20 miles (32 km) northwest of Oshkosh.

Medina contains a playground/park area, named "Armitage Park". Postal service is provided by the Hortonville post office, ZIP code 54944.

== History ==
The first settlers in Medina were Zebediah Hyde, Lewis Hyde, and Alva McCrary, and Samuel Young and sons, who arrived in 1848.

The town was originally named Young's Corner after one of Samuel Young's sons, William Young. The name was changed to Medina prior to 1851.

A post office called Medina was established in 1852, and remained in operation until it was discontinued in 1966. The community was named after Medina, Ohio. The Milwaukee Lake Shore and Western Railroad previously ran through this town, until it was turned into the "Wiowash Trail," Which gets its name from the counties it runs through: Winnebago, Outagamie, Waupaca, and Shawano.

== Geography ==
Medina is located at 44°16′22″N 88°38′16″W (44.2727609, -88.6378863), and the elevation is 820 feet (250 m).

== Education ==
Educational services are provided by the School District of New London.

== Transportation ==
Medina is located on Wisconsin Highway 96. Outagamie County Highways M also intersects the community.

== Notable people ==
- Henry N. Culbertson, farmer and Wisconsin legislator, was born in Medina.
- William H. H. Wroe, merchant and Wisconsin legislator, lived and was Treasurer and Postmaster of Medina.

== Images ==
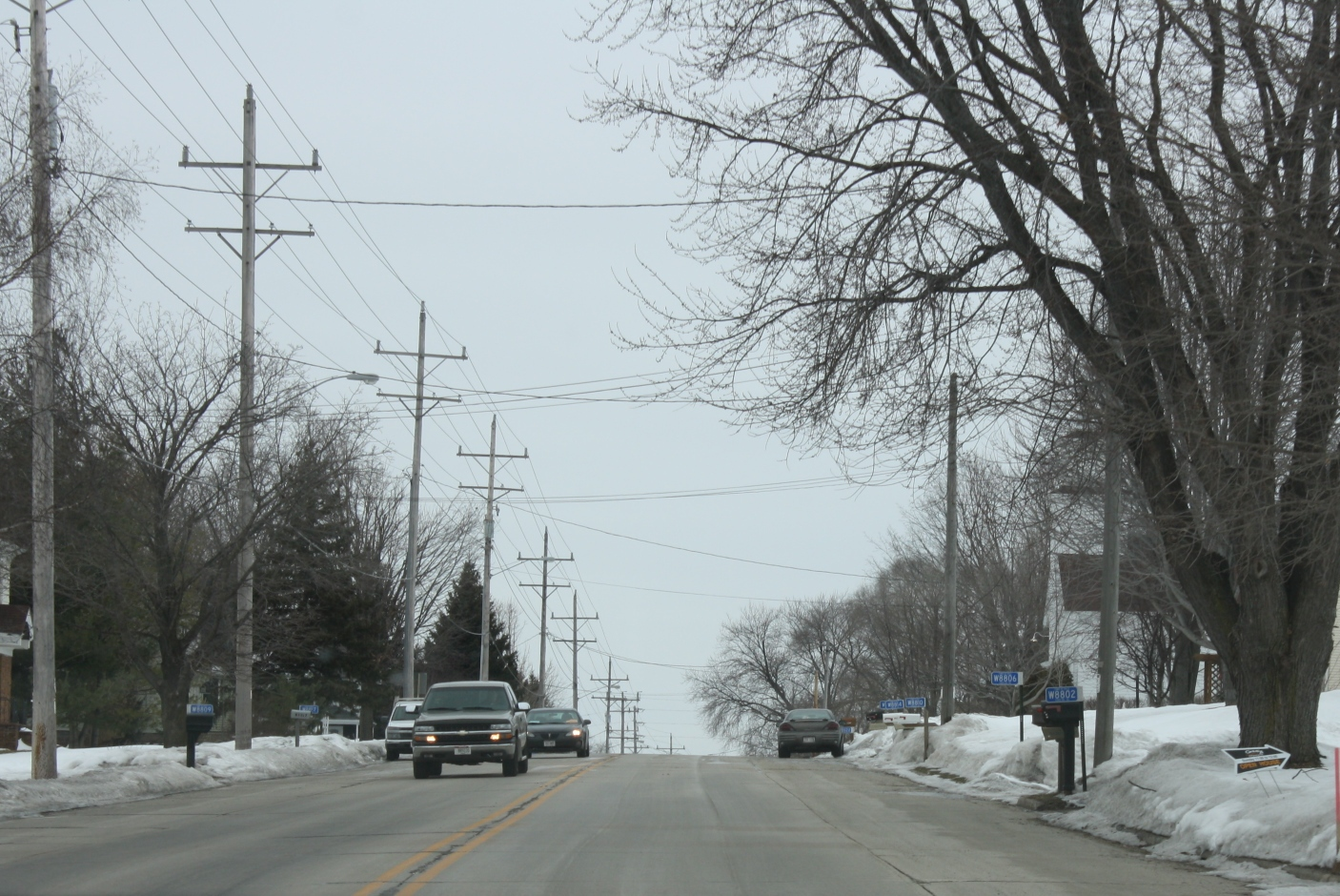
Looking west at Medina

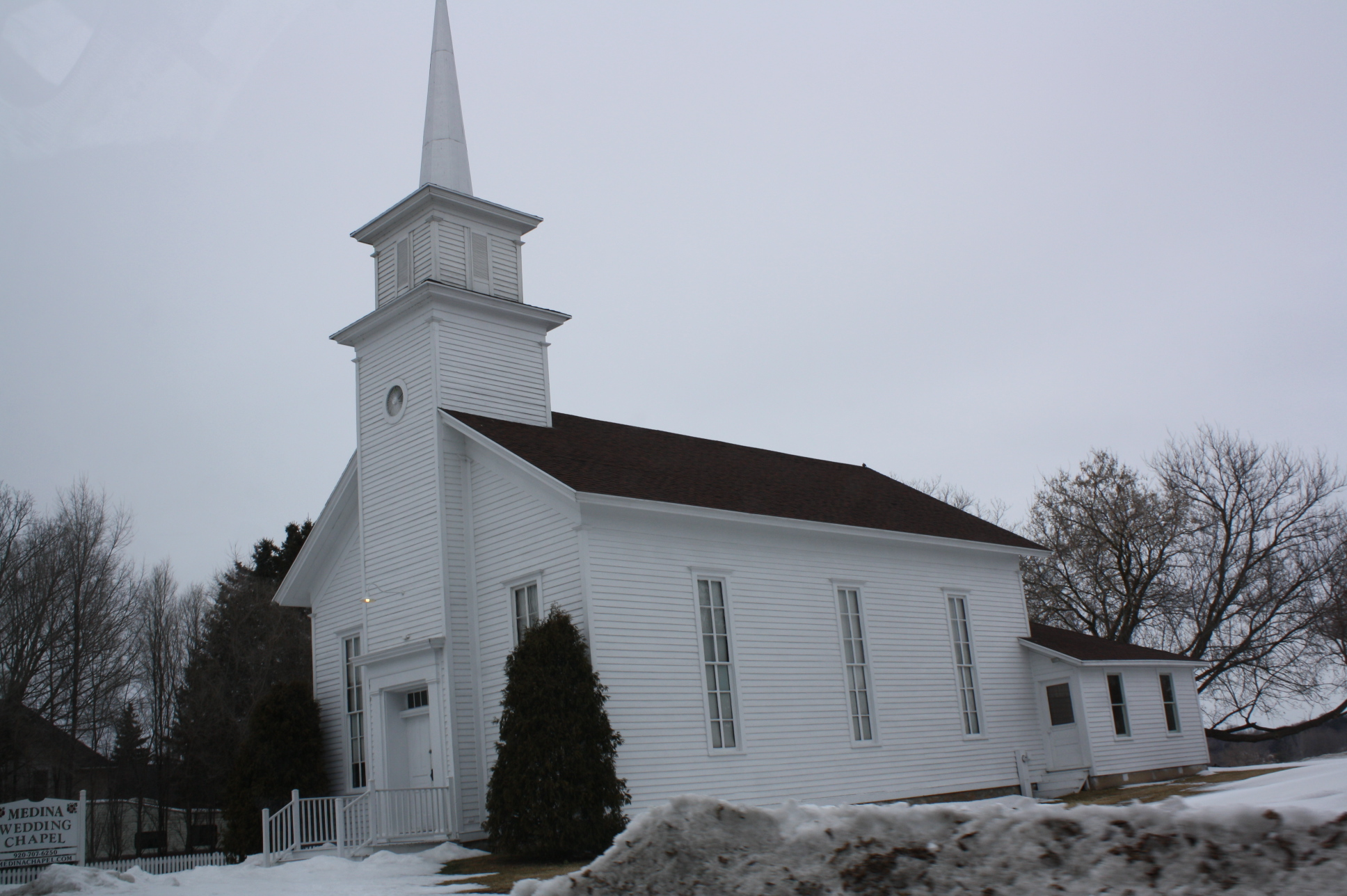
Medina Wedding Chapel
