= Hortonville Joint School District No. 1 v. Hortonville Education Association =

- Supreme Court of the United States

Argued February 23–24, 1976 Decided June 17, 1976
- Full case name: Hortonville Joint School District No. 1 et al. v. Hortonville Education Assn. et al.
- Docket no.: 74-1606
- Citations: 426 U.S. 482 (more) 96 S. Ct. 2308; 49 L. Ed. 2d 1; 1976 U.S. LEXIS 64
- Argument: Oral argument

Case history
- Prior: Certiorari to the Supreme Court of Wisconsin

Holding
- The Due Process Clause of the Fourteenth Amendment did not guarantee respondent teachers that the decision to terminate their employment would be made or reviewed by a body other than the School Board.

Court membership
- Chief Justice Warren E. Burger Associate Justices William J. Brennan Jr. · Potter Stewart; Byron White · Thurgood Marshall; Harry Blackmun · Lewis F. Powell Jr. William Rehnquist · John P. Stevens

Case opinions
- Majority: Burger, joined by White, Blackmun, Powell, Rehnquist, Stevens
- Dissent: Stewart, joined by Brennan, Marshall

Laws applied
- U.S. Const. amend. XIV

Hortonville Joint School District No. 1 v. Hortonville Education Association, 426 U.S. 482 (1976), was a United States Supreme Court case in which the Court ruled that a public school board did not violate the due process clause of the Fourteenth Amendment of the United States Constitution when it fired teachers who went on strike after contract negotiations with the board broke down.

== Background ==
In 1974, members of the teachers' union in the Hortonville Area School District in Wisconsin went on strike after contract negotiations broke down with the district's School Board. However, Wisconsin law "prohibited the strike". The district's superintendent asked the striking teachers to return to work, but none of the striking teachers returned. One week later, the Board conducted disciplinary proceedings and voted to terminate the employment of the striking teachers. The teachers objected to the firing and filed a lawsuit in state court in which they argued that the Board's decision violated the due process clause of the Fourteenth Amendment of the United States Constitution. The trial court rejected the teachers' arguments, but on appeal, the Supreme Court of Wisconsin ruled that that "Federal Constitution required that the teachers' conduct and the Board's response be evaluated by an impartial decisionmaker other than the Board." The Supreme Court of the United States granted certiorari to determine whether the Board's actions violate the Fourteenth Amendment's due process clause.

== Opinion of the Court ==
Writing for a majority of the Court, Chief Justice Warren Burger held that "the Board's prior role as negotiator does not disqualify it to decide that the public interest in maintaining uninterrupted classroom work required that teachers striking in violation of state law be discharged." Chief Justice Burger concluded that the Board's decision did not violate due process because the decision to terminate the teachers was not "infected by the sort of bias that we have held to disqualify other decisionmakers as a matter of federal due process."

=== Justice Stewart's dissenting opinion ===
Associate Justice Potter Stewart wrote a dissenting opinion in which he argued that the Board's decision to terminate the teachers violated the Fourteenth Amendment's due process clause because "the Board members were not impartial decisionmakers." Citing Withrow v. Larkin, Justice Stewart argued that "[i]t is now well established that a biased decisionmaker [is] constitutionally unacceptable [and] our system of law has always endeavored to prevent even the probability of unfairness."

== See also ==
- List of United States Supreme Court cases, volume 426
- List of United States Supreme Court cases
- Lists of United States Supreme Court cases by volume
- List of United States Supreme Court cases by the Burger Court
