= Hortonville Community Hall =

- U.S. National Register of Historic Places
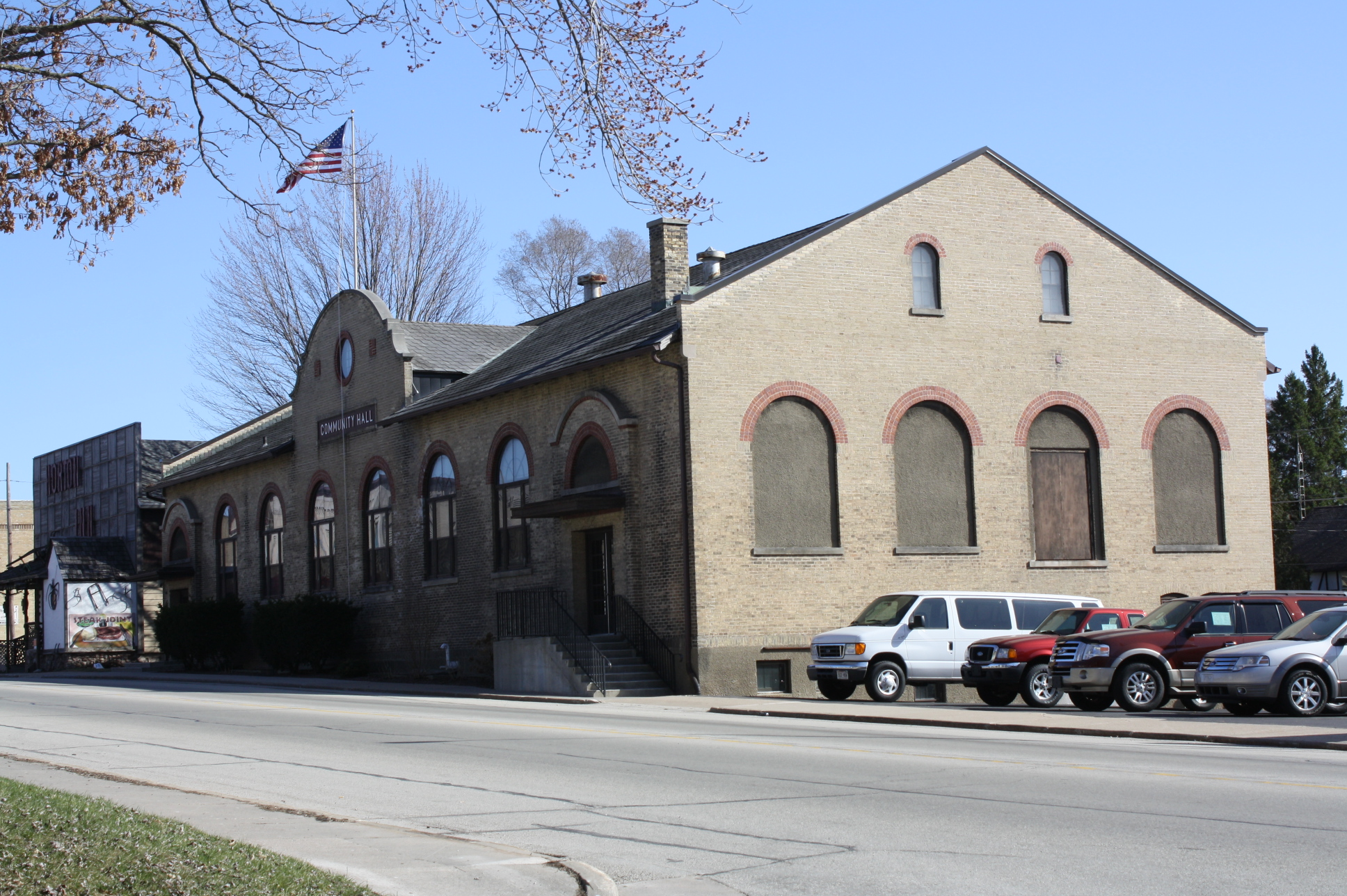
- Hortonville Community Hall
- Location: 312 W. Main St., Hortonville, Wisconsin
- Coordinates: 44°20′07″N 88°38′28″W
- Area: 0.1 acres (0.040 ha)
- Built: 1912
- Architect: Robert Messmer
- Architectural style: Spanish Colonial Revival
- NRHP reference No.: 81000053
- Added to NRHP: January 23, 1981

The Hortonville Community Hall is located in Hortonville, Wisconsin.

== History ==
The uses of the building have included as a meeting hall, dance hall and opera house. It was listed on the National Register of Historic Places in 1981 and on the State Register of Historic Places in 1989.
