= Alexander B. Whitman =

American politician (1854–1910)

Alexander Bert Whitman (April 1, 1854 – September 23, 1910) was a member of the Wisconsin State Senate.

== Biography ==
Whitman was born on April 1, 1854, in Turner, Maine. He moved with his parents to what is now Oshkosh, Wisconsin, in 1857 and later to Hortonville, Wisconsin, where he worked in a saw mill and as a lumberman. Later, he attended Lawrence University and worked as a schoolteacher in Sturgeon Bay, Wisconsin before practicing law in Appleton, Wisconsin.

== Political career ==
Whitman was a member of the Senate during the 1897 and 1899 sessions representing the 14th District. He was also Superintendent of Schools of Appleton from 1882 to 1889, District Attorney of Outagamie County, Wisconsin from 1889 to 1891 and City Attorney of Appleton from 1894 to 1897. Whitman was a Republican.

Whitman died September 23, 1910, and is interred in Hortonville.
