= Hortonville, Wisconsin =

- Village
- logo

- Location of Hortonville in Outagamie County, Wisconsin.
- Coordinates: 44°20′7″N 88°38′20″W
- Country: United States
- State: Wisconsin
- County: Outagamie
- Established: 1848

Area
  - Total: 3.47 sq mi (8.99 km^{2})
  - Land: 3.39 sq mi (8.78 km^{2})
  - Water: 0.077 sq mi (0.20 km^{2})
- Elevation: 794 ft (242 m)

Population (2020)
  - Total: 3,028
  - Density: 893/sq mi (345/km^{2})
- Time zone: UTC-6 (Central (CST))
  - Summer (DST): UTC-5 (CDT)
- Postal code: 54944
- Area code: 920
- FIPS code: 55-35850
- GNIS feature ID: 1566752
- Website: Village Website

Hortonville is a village in Outagamie County, Wisconsin, United States. The population was 3,028 at the 2020 census.

Hortonville is in the Fox Cities region and the Appleton-Oshkosh-Neenah, WI CSA, Wisconsin's third-largest metropolitan area.

== History ==
In 1848, Alonzo Horton purchased 1,500 acres from the governor of Wisconsin, now known as the Town of Hortonia and the Village of Hortonville, for 70 cents per acre. He built a cabin and dammed the Black Otter Creek, creating the 75-acre (300,000 m^{2}) Black Otter Lake. After laying out a plat for the community by buying land and platting it off in 1849, Horton was swayed westward by the California Gold Rush. He later developed the city of San Diego, California.

On August 11, 1894, the settlement was incorporated as the Village of Hortonville. It had one of the world's first match light factories.

Two feature films are said to have been set in Hortonville, Janie (1944) and Janie Gets Married (1947).

During World War II, a German POW camp was established in Hortonville along County Hwy MM on the north side of the village.

On March 18, 1974, the teachers at the Hortonville Community School went on strike, an event that received national news coverage.

In 1981, the Hortonville Community Hall, now known as the Hortonville Opera House, was added to the National Register of Historic Places.

In 2023, a group of Hortonville residents received regional news coverage for their attendance at the Major League Baseball Milwaukee Brewers debut of Hortonville-raised Caleb Boushley.

== Geography ==
Hortonville is located at 44°20′7″N 88°38′20″W (44.335196, -88.638847).

According to the United States Census Bureau, the village has an area of 3.55 square miles (9.19 km^{2}), of which 3.47 square miles (8.99 km^{2}) is land and 0.08 square miles (0.21 km^{2}) is water.

=== Black Otter Lake ===
The community is on the shores of the 75-acre (300,000 m^{2}) Black Otter Lake. It is drained by Black Otter Creek, which flows into the Wolf River just north of the village. The lake's watershed is estimated to be 16 square miles (41 km^{2}).

Black Otter is Outagamie County's only public-access lake, so it receives substantial recreational use, primarily by anglers. Fish species in the lake include bluegill, largemouth bass, black crappie, yellow perch, northern pike and catfish.

The village maintains two public boat launches, a kayak launch, a fishing pier, and three parks along the lakeshore.

=== Wolf River ===
The village is about 2 miles south of the Wolf River. Buchman Access, a public boat launch, is along County M. The river is also the border between the Town of Hortonia and the Town of Liberty.

== Demographics ==
Hortonville is a part of the Appleton-Oshkosh-Neenah CSA, a Combined Statistical Area that includes the Appleton, Wisconsin metropolitan area (Calumet and Outagamie counties) and Oshkosh-Neenah (Winnebago County) metropolitan areas, which had a combined population of 358,365 at the 2000 census.

Historical population
Census	Pop.	Note	%±
1880	311		—
1890	440		41.5%
1900	913		107.5%
1910	863		−5.5%
1920	960		11.2%
1930	906		−5.6%
1940	968		6.8%
1950	1,081		11.7%
1960	1,366		26.4%
1970	1,524		11.6%
1980	2,016		32.3%
1990	2,029		0.6%
2000	2,357		16.2%
2010	2,711		15.0%
2020	3,028		11.7%
U.S. Decennial Census

=== 2010 census ===
As of the census of 2010, there were 2,711 people, 1,045 households, and 766 families residing in the village. The population density was 781.3 inhabitants per square mile (301.7/km^{2}). There were 1,105 housing units at an average density of 318.4 per square mile (122.9/km^{2}). The racial makeup of the village was 96.9% White, 0.2% African American, 0.2% Native American, 1.2% Asian, 0.4% from other races, and 1.1% from two or more races. Hispanic or Latino of any race were 1.5% of the population.

There were 1,045 households, of which 38.8% had children under the age of 18 living with them, 57.1% were married couples living together, 10.6% had a female householder with no husband present, 5.6% had a male householder with no wife present, and 26.7% were non-families. 22.0% of all households were made up of individuals, and 7.3% had someone living alone who was 65 years of age or older. The average household size was 2.59 and the average family size was 3.01.

The median age in the village was 36.7 years. 26.9% of residents were under the age of 18; 7.5% were between the ages of 18 and 24; 29% were from 25 to 44; 25.2% were from 45 to 64; and 11.4% were 65 years of age or older. The gender makeup of the village was 49.2% male and 50.8% female.

=== 2000 census ===
At the 2000 census, there were 2,357 people, 871 households and 634 families residing in the village. The population density was 868.2 per square mile (335.8/km^{2}). There were 904 housing units at an average density of 333.0 per square mile (128.8/km^{2}). The racial makeup of the village was 96.99% White, 0.13% African American, 0.04% Native American, 2.21% Asian, 0.17% from other races, and 0.47% from two or more races. Hispanic or Latino of any race were 0.64% of the population.

There were 871 households, of which 38.9% had children under the age of 18 living with them, 60.5% were married couples living together, 9.0% had a female householder with no husband present, and 27.1% were non-families. 22.4% of all households were made up of individuals, and 8.8% had someone living alone who was 65 years of age or older. The average household size was 2.70 and the average family size was 3.21.

29.7% of the population were under the age of 18, 7.6% from 18 to 24, 31.3% from 25 to 44, 20.8% from 45 to 64, and 10.6% who were 65 years of age or older. The median age was 34 years. For every 100 females, there were 92.9 males. For every 100 females age 18 and over, there were 91.7 males.

The median household income was $51,635 and the median family income was $55,298. Males had a median income of $41,689 compared with $24,680 for females. The per capita income for the village was $20,277. About 4.4% of families and 6.9% of the population were below the poverty line, including 12.2% of those under age 18 and 6.0% of those age 65 or over.

== Transportation ==
=== Roads ===
WIS 15 travels east to Greenville and Appleton and west to New London.
County M (Nash Street and Olk Street) travels north to WIS 54 and south to WIS 96 at Medina.
County T travels northwest to New London and south to WIS 96 at Dale.
County JJ (Main Street) travels east to Greenville and Kaukauna.
County MM (North Crest Street) travels northeast to WIS 76 at Stephensville.
County TT travels west to US 45, which was rerouted west of the village in 2003.
Rustic Road 61 is a 3.5-mile (5.6 km) state-designated scenic route that follows County MM from Hortonville to Stephensville.

=== Airports ===
- Appleton International Airport (ATW) is 10 miles (16 km) southeast of Hortonville, and provides commercial airline service to the village.
- Black Otter Airport (9WI1) is a privately owned grass strip just east of the Black Otter Lake. Permission is required to land here.

=== Rail ===
The fox valley and lake superior rail system operates the former Canadian National railway track, which is also the former Fox Valley & Western Railroad track along the southern edge of the village, with a freight station near S Nash Street. It also operates 3 crossings at W Main Street/ WIS 15, S Lincoln Street, and S Nash Street.

== Religion ==
The Wisconsin Evangelical Lutheran Synod has a church in Hortonville: Bethlehem Lutheran Church, which dedicated a new church in 2018. Ss. Peter and Paul Catholic Community, a Roman Catholic church, has been in Hortonville since 1897.

== Education ==
The Hortonville Area School District, which includes a high school, two middle schools and three elementary schools, serves the village and the surrounding communities. Bethlehem Lutheran School is a 4K-8th grade Christian school of the Wisconsin Evangelical Lutheran Synod in Hortonville.

== Parks ==
- Alonzo Park, along East Main Street, features a playground, covered pavilion with tables, and a grass walking trail through the woods.
- Miller Park, along West Main Street near the Black Otter Creek, offers a playground, two tennis courts and a baseball diamond.
- Black Otter Park, along West Main Street, features a covered picnic table and a kayak launch into Black Otter Lake.
- Commercial Club Park is a privately owned park along County Highway M, and features a playground, pavilion, baseball diamond, and a basketball court.

== Points of interest ==
- Black Otter Lake
- Grand View Golf Club
- Wiouwash State Trail
- Wolf River
- Hortonville is also in a popular Roblox game, “Greenville RP.” In game, the village is called Horton, however it does not physically resemble the actual village.

== Notable people ==
- Caleb Boushley, Major League Baseball player
- Dave Gassner, professional baseball player
- David Hodgins, Wisconsin legislator
- Isaac N. McComb, Wisconsin legislator and physician
- Charlie Nagreen, inventor of the hamburger
- Gerald Nye, U.S. Senator from North Dakota
- Alexander B. Whitman, Wisconsin legislator

== Images ==
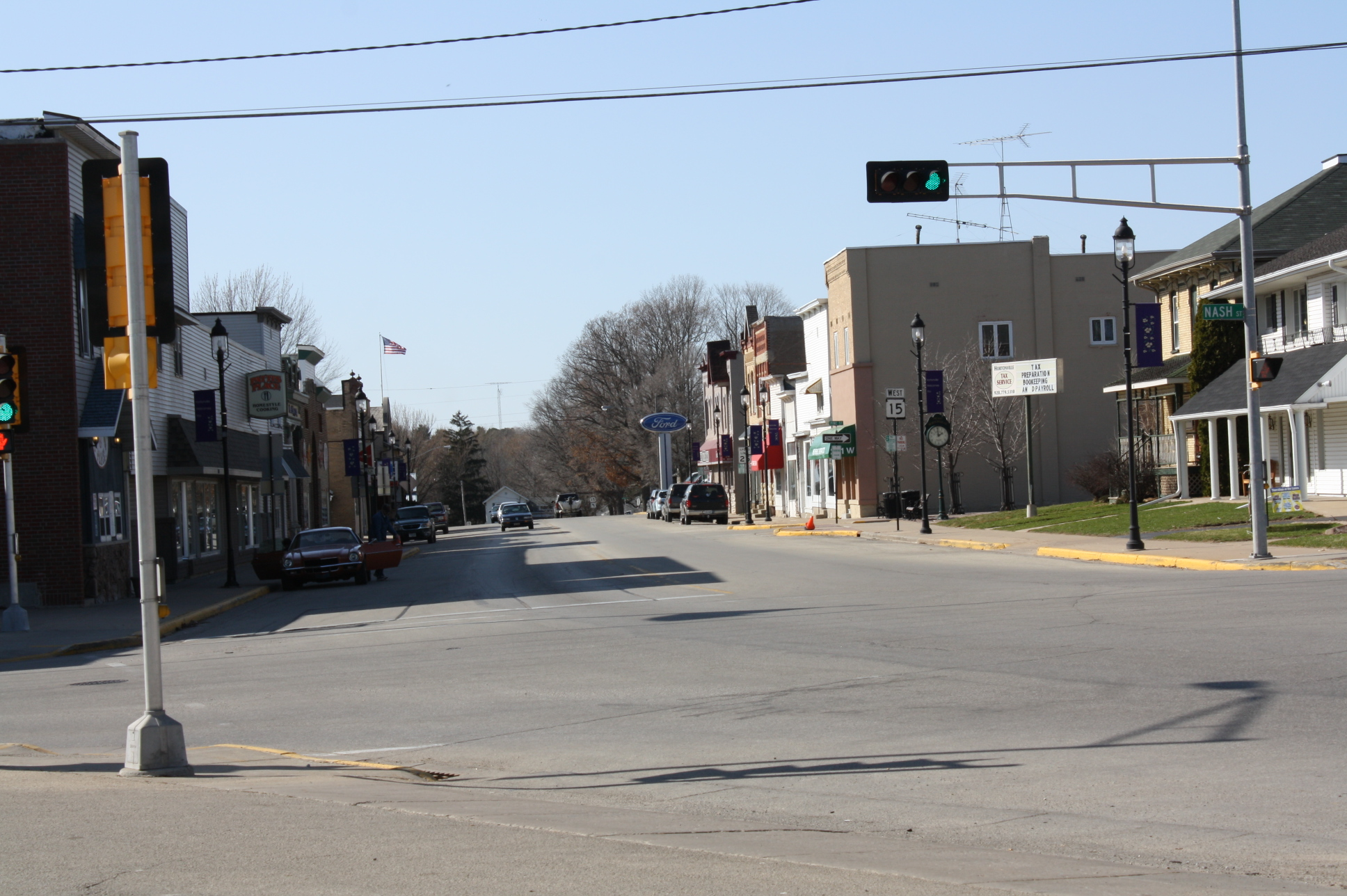
Looking west at downtown Hortonville

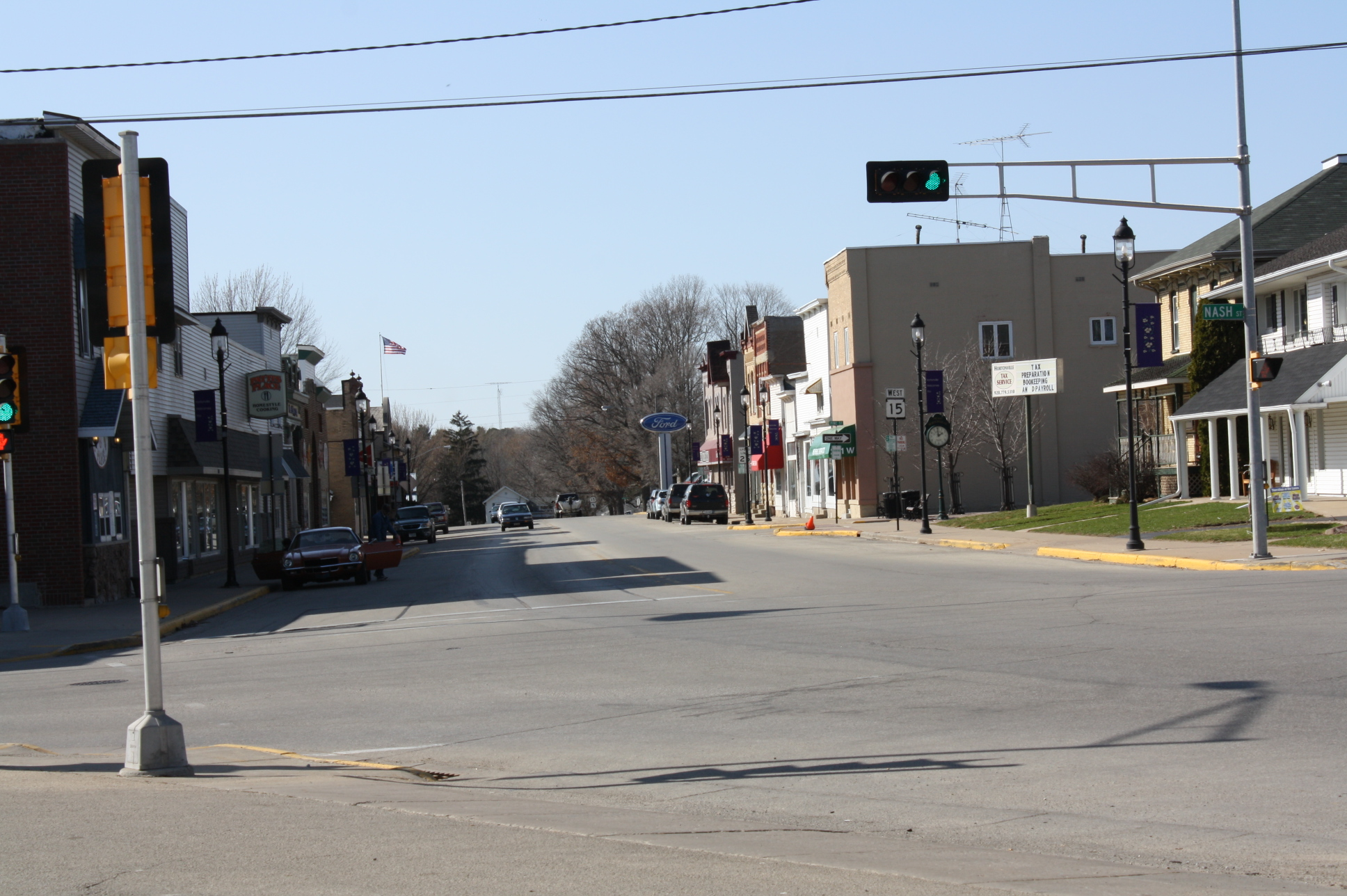
Looking east at downtown Hortonville

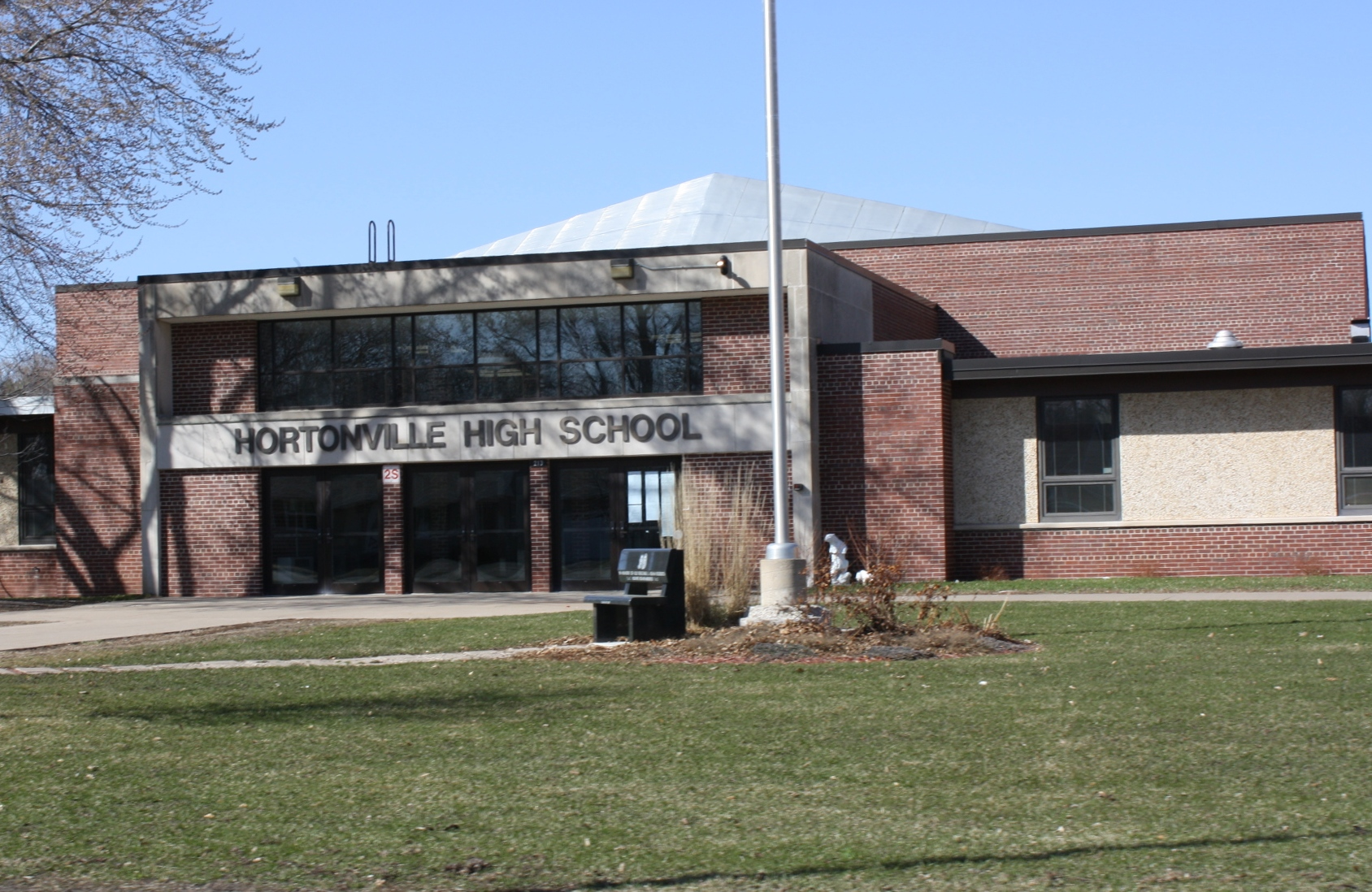
Hortonville High School

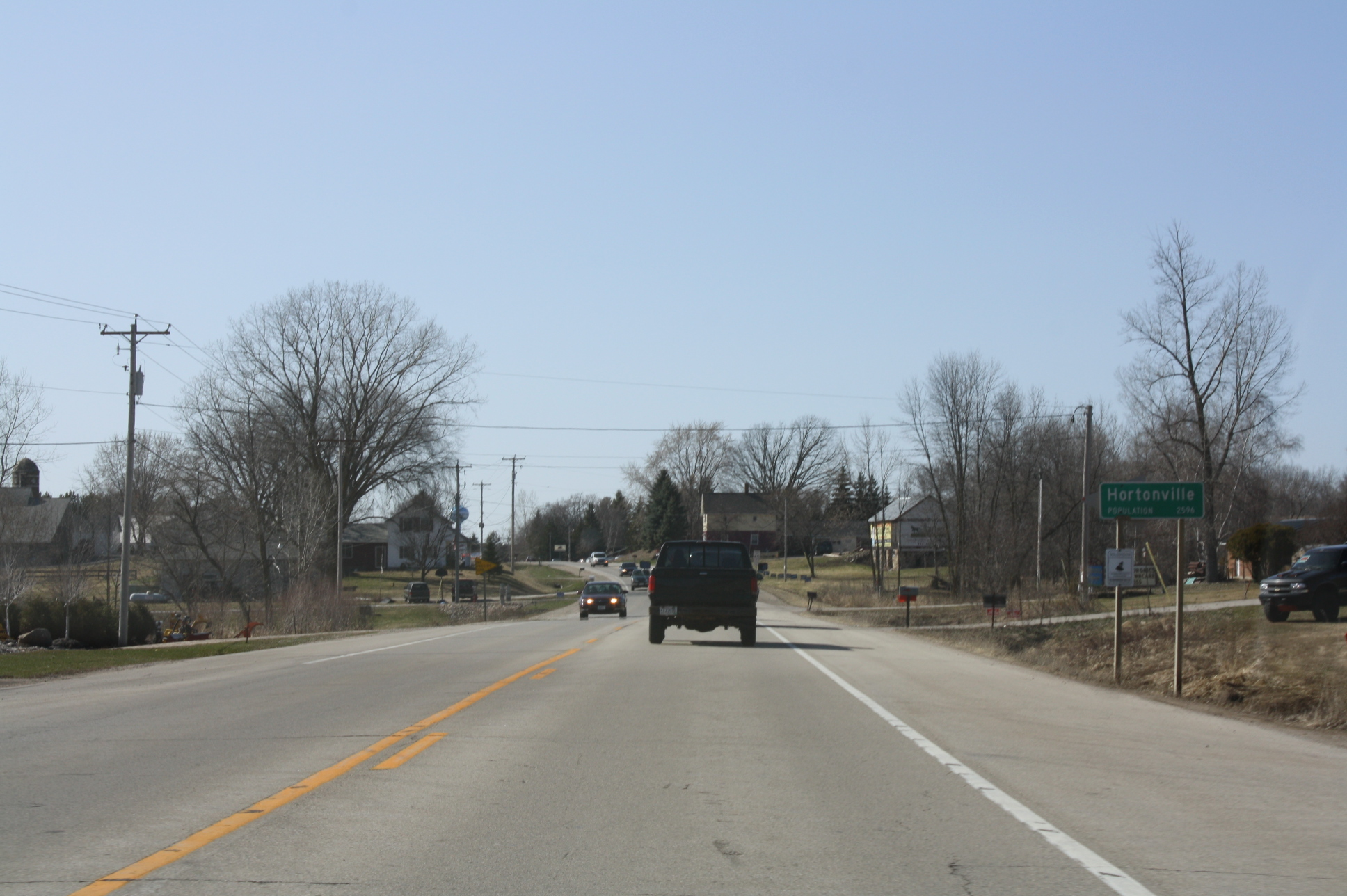
Welcome sign

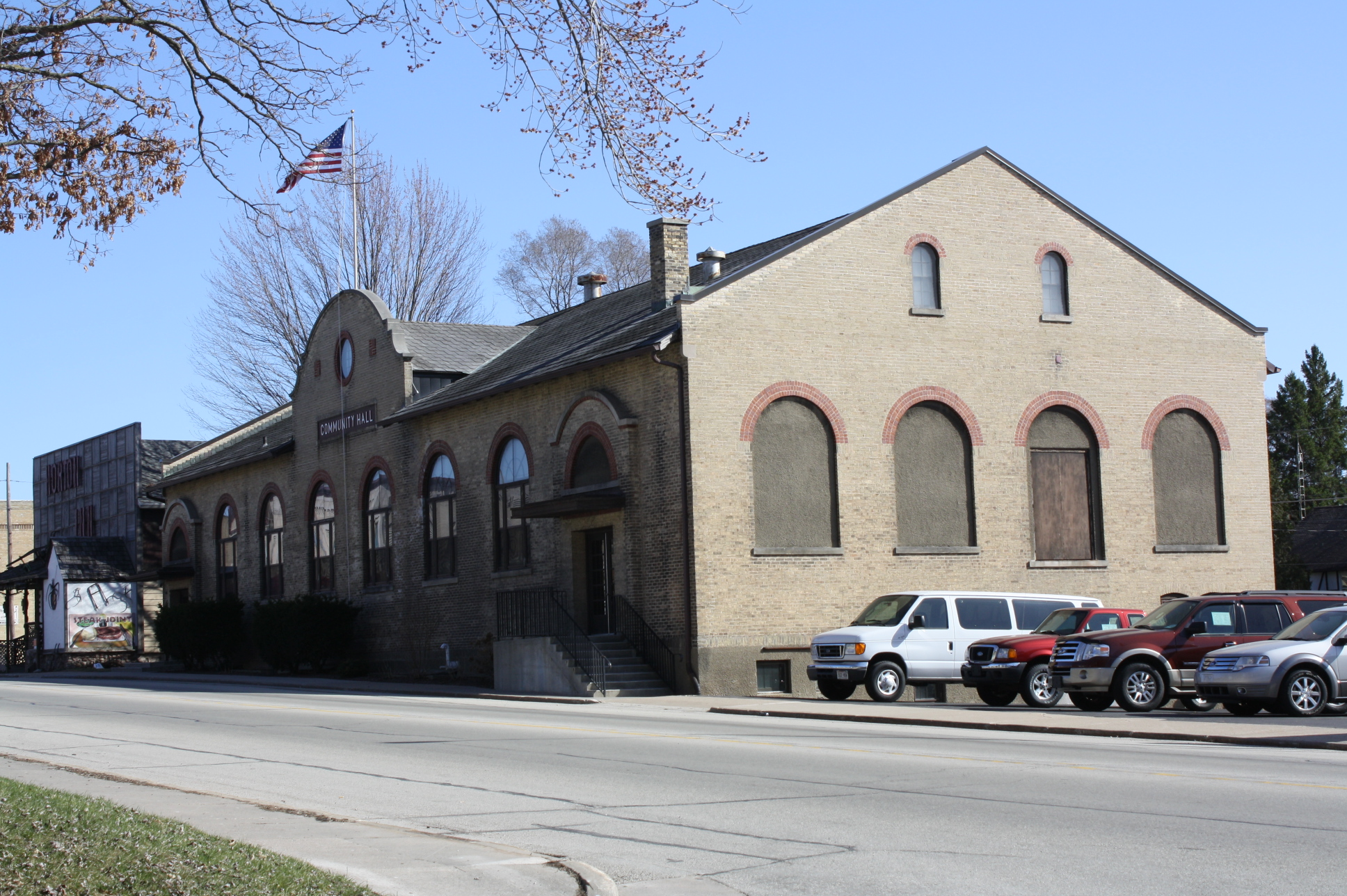
Hortonville Community Hall, on the National Register of Historic Places
