= Henry N. Culbertson =

American farmer and politician

Henry N. Culbertson (August 6, 1860 – May 13, 1943) was a farmer and politician.

Born in the unincorporated community of Medina, town of Dale, Outagamie County, Wisconsin, Culbertson was a farmer and was involved with the National Grange of the Order of Patrons of Husbandry in Outagamie County. Culbertson served as chairman of the town board and on the Outagamie County Board of Supervisors. From 1912 to 1917, Culbertson served in the Wisconsin State Senate. He was never involved with partisan politics but was involved with the progressive movement. He died at his home in Medina, in Outagamie County.
