= Ellington, Wisconsin =

- Town
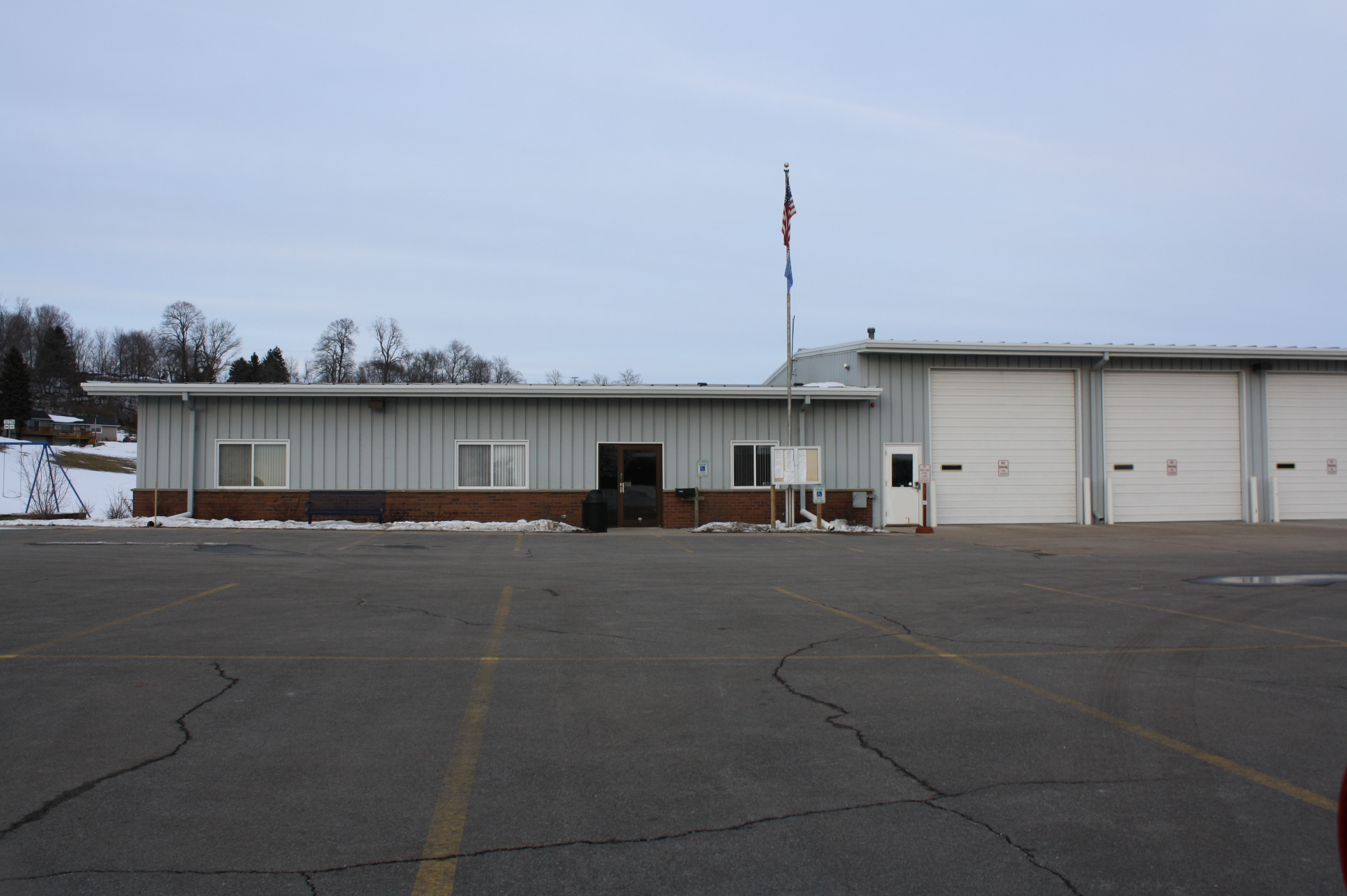
- Ellington Community Center

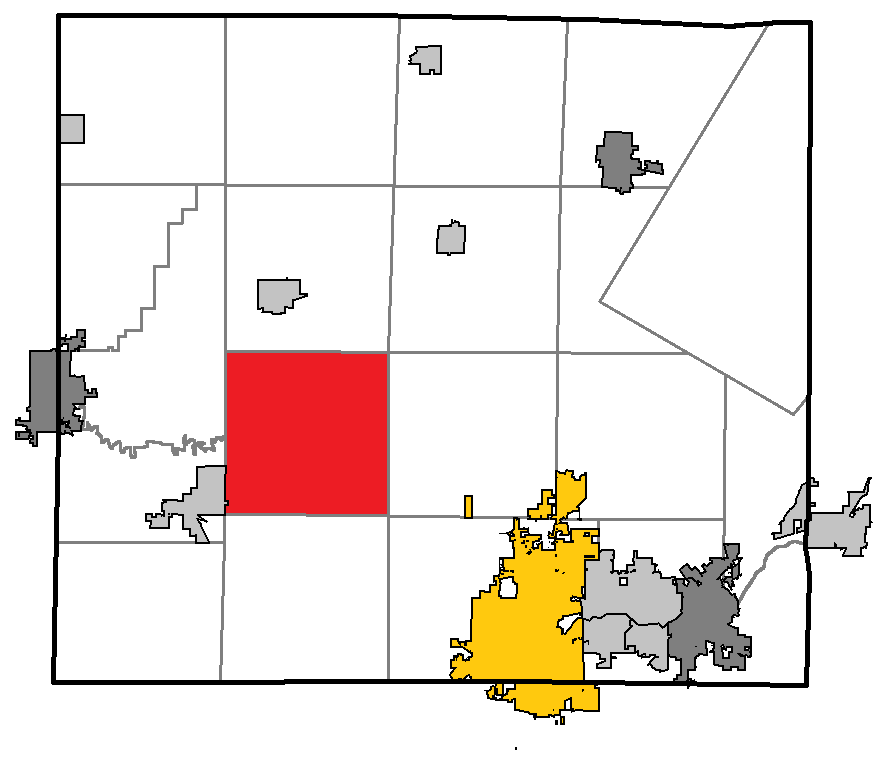
- Location of Ellington, within Outagamie County Map
- Coordinates: 44°21′59″N 88°33′29″W
- Country: United States
- State: Wisconsin
- County: Outagamie

Area
  - Total: 35.0 sq mi (90.7 km^{2})
  - Land: 34.9 sq mi (90.3 km^{2})
  - Water: 0.15 sq mi (0.4 km^{2})
- Elevation: 768 ft (234 m)

Population (2020)
  - Total: 3,174
  - Density: 73/sq mi (28.1/km^{2})
- Time zone: UTC-6 (Central (CST))
  - Summer (DST): UTC-5 (CDT)
- FIPS code: 55-23425
- GNIS feature ID: 1583154
- Website: https://townofellington.wi.gov/

Ellington is a town in Outagamie County, Wisconsin, United States. The population was 3,174 at the 2020 census. The unincorporated community of Stephensville is located in the town.

== Geography ==
According to the United States Census Bureau, the town has a total area of 35.0 square miles (90.7 km^{2}), of which 34.9 square miles (90.3 km^{2}) is land and 0.2 square mile (0.4 km^{2}) (0.46%) is water.

== Demographics ==
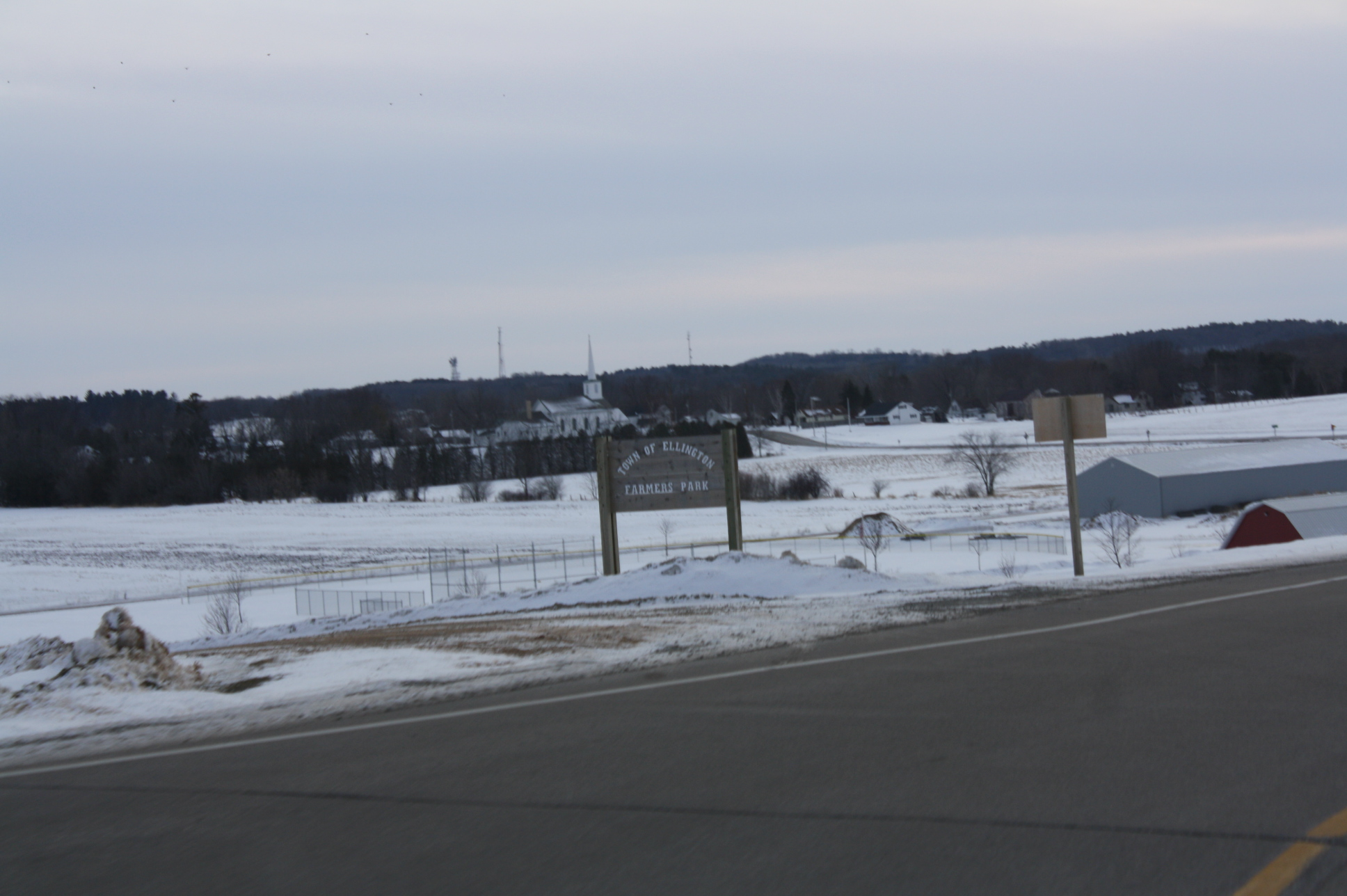
Landscape in Ellington from Wisconsin Highway 76.

As of the census of 2000, there were 2,535 people, 847 households, and 704 families residing in the town. The population density was 72.7 people per square mile (28.1/km^{2}). There were 870 housing units at an average density of 25.0 per square mile (9.6/km^{2}). The racial makeup of the town was 98.46% White, 0.08% African American, 0.12% Native American, 0.67% Asian, 0.20% from other races, and 0.47% from two or more races. Hispanic or Latino of any race were 0.55% of the population.

There were 847 households, out of which 42.0% had children under the age of 18 living with them, 75.8% were married couples living together, 3.8% had a female householder with no husband present, and 16.8% were non-families. 13.6% of all households were made up of individuals, and 4.8% had someone living alone who was 65 years of age or older. The average household size was 2.99 and the average family size was 3.32.

In the town, the population was spread out, with 31.2% under the age of 18, 6.2% from 18 to 24, 31.9% from 25 to 44, 23.0% from 45 to 64, and 7.6% who were 65 years of age or older. The median age was 35 years. For every 100 females, there were 109.9 males. For every 100 females age 18 and over, there were 110.5 males.

The median income for a household in the town was $53,750, and the median income for a family was $56,152. Males had a median income of $39,784 versus $26,538 for females. The per capita income for the town was $19,698. About 1.8% of families and 2.4% of the population were below the poverty line, including 4.6% of those under age 18 and none of those age 65 or over.

== Notable people ==
- Lorenzo E. Darling, politician, lived in the town
- Charles F. Ploeger, politician, was born in the town
- Burt W. Rynders, politician, was born in the town
