= Dale, Wisconsin =

- Town
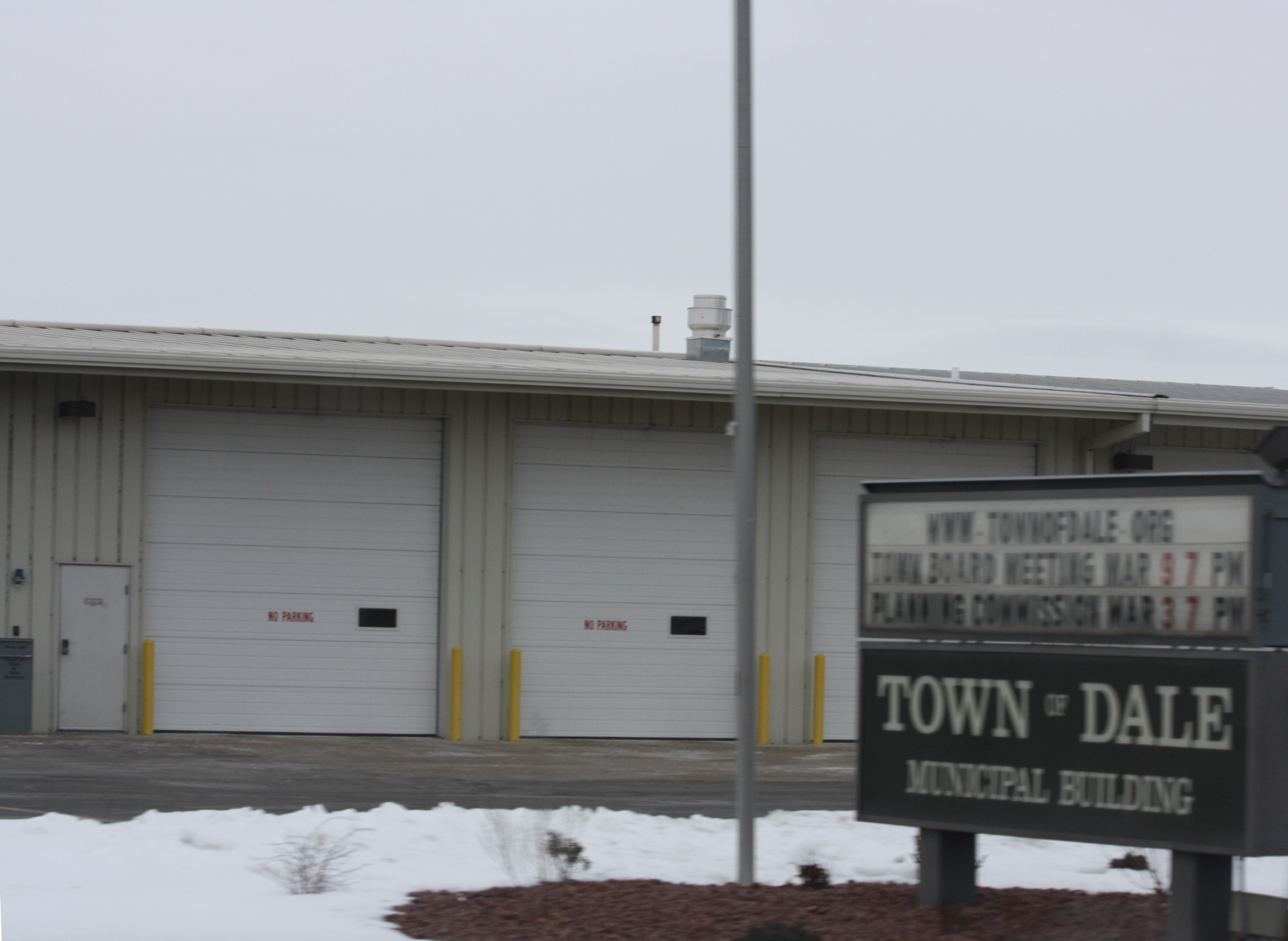
- Town hall in Dale

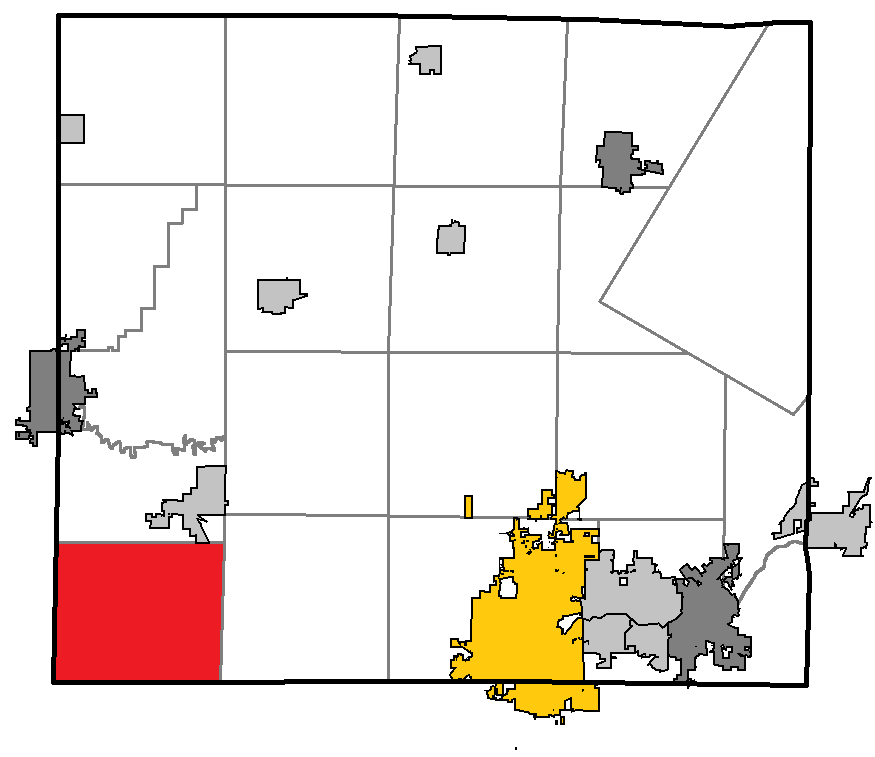
- Location of Dale, within Outagamie County
- Coordinates: 44°17′2″N 88°40′5″W
- Country: United States
- State: Wisconsin
- County: Outagamie
- Established: November 18, 1853

Area
  - Total: 30.5 sq mi (78.9 km^{2})
  - Land: 30.4 sq mi (78.8 km^{2})
  - Water: 0.039 sq mi (0.1 km^{2})
- Elevation: 856 ft (261 m)

Population (2020)
  - Total: 2,869
  - Density: 94.3/sq mi (36.4/km^{2})
- Time zone: UTC-6 (Central (CST))
  - Summer (DST): UTC-5 (CDT)
- Area code: 920
- FIPS code: 55-18525
- GNIS feature ID: 1583044
- Website: http://www.townofdale.org/

Dale is a town in Outagamie County, Wisconsin, United States, established on November 17, 1853. The population was 2,869 at the 2020 census. The census-designated place of Dale and the unincorporated community of Medina are located in the town.

== History ==
The land that now encompasses the town of Dale was originally part of the neighboring town of Hortonia. It was first separated from Hortonia and organized as the town of Medina on December 16, 1851, during a special night session of Hortonia's town board. Dissension arose over the proposed borders of the new town. Consequently, just over two months later, on February 23, 1852, the board unanimously repealed the action to create the Town of Medina, returning the land to Hortonia.

Nearly two years later, the town of Dale was established on November 18, 1853, again separating control from the town of Hortonia.

== Geography ==
According to the United States Census Bureau, the town has a total area of 30.5 square miles (78.9 km^{2}), of which 30.4 square miles (78.8 km^{2}) is land and 0.04 square mile (0.1 km^{2}) (0.10%) is water.

== Demographics ==
As of the census of 2020, the total population was 5,308 people with a population density of 113.4 per square mile (29.0/km^{2}). There were 812 housing units at an average density of 26.7 per square mile (10.3/km^{2}). The racial makeup of the town was 98.38% White, 0.04% African American, 0.13% Native American, 0.92% Asian, 0.22% from other races, and 0.31% from two or more races. Hispanic or Latino of any race were 0.87% of the population.

There were 785 households, out of which 40.9% had children under the age of 18 living with them, 79.1% were married couples living together, 3.2% had a female householder with no husband present, and 16.1% were non-families. 12.6% of all households were made up of individuals, and 3.6% had someone living alone who was 65 years of age or older. The average household size was 2.91 and the average family size was 3.20.

In the town, the population was spread out, with 30.1% under the age of 18, 5.3% from 18 to 24, 33.6% from 25 to 44, 24.0% from 45 to 64, and 6.9% who were 65 years of age or older. The median age was 36 years. For every 100 females, there were 102.3 males. For every 100 females age 18 and over, there were 107.1 males.

The median income for a household in the town was $60,152, and the median income for a family was $62,935. Males had a median income of $41,463 versus $26,410 for females. The per capita income for the town was $27,993. About 0.4% of families and 1.5% of the population were below the poverty line, including 1.7% of those under age 18 and 4.7% of those age 65 or over.
