= Wrightstown =

Wrightstown is the name of a number of communities in the United States, including:

- Wrightstown, New Jersey
- Wrightstown, Pennsylvania, a community within the township
- Wrightstown Township, Pennsylvania
- Wrightstown, Wisconsin
- Town of Wrightstown, Wisconsin
