= Gnarly Cider Brewery =

Gnarly Cedar Brewery is a craft brewery in Wrightstown, Wisconsin, located on the Fox River. The brewery is a subsidiary of LedgeStone Vineyards, a winery in nearby Greenleaf, Wisconsin.

== History ==
=== Origins ===
Gnarly Cedar Brewery was established in 2019 by Adam Magnuson and Katrina Cegledi, who had purchased LedgeStone Vineyards in 2017. The brewery is named after one of the oldest northern white cedar trees in Wisconsin, located near the LedgeStone property.

The brewery initially operated from shared production space at LedgeStone Vineyards in Greenleaf, using a seven-barrel brewing system.

=== Wrightstown expansion ===
In 2023, the Village of Wrightstown approached the brewery owners about acquiring the village's former Department of Public Works building at 420 Washington Street for a standalone brewery location. The building had previously housed the village's original water well.

The Village of Wrightstown Board of Trustees approved parameters for a developer's agreement with Gnarly Cedar Holdings LLC on February 20, 2024. The property was conveyed by warranty deed recorded with the Brown County Register of Deeds on March 25, 2024. A correction instrument addressing the legal description was recorded on April 3, 2024.

The brewery announced plans to open in summer 2024, but the opening was delayed. The Wrightstown location held its grand opening on September 13, 2025.

== Location ==
The Wrightstown brewery is located at 420 Washington Street in the Wrightstown River District, with 184 feet (56 m) of Fox River waterfront. The property is situated on Parcel VW-131-1 on the east side of the Fox River.

The Fox River Valley region is characterized by karst topography, with fractured dolomite and limestone bedrock that allows surface water to reach groundwater rapidly through direct conduits rather than filtering through soil layers.

== Operations ==
The brewery operates a taproom and kitchen serving Detroit-style pizza, smash burgers, and other gastropub fare. The facility includes 20 tap lines featuring house-brewed beers as well as wines from LedgeStone Vineyards.

=== Environmental considerations ===
Brewery wastewater typically contains elevated levels of phosphorus from cleaning chemicals used in brewing equipment sanitation, with phosphorus concentrations up to ten times higher than domestic wastewater. In karst regions, such contaminants can reach aquifers through bedrock fractures without natural filtration.

== See also ==
- LedgeStone Vineyards
- Fox River (Green Bay tributary)
- Wisconsin beer
- Wrightstown, Wisconsin
- Karst
