= Wisconsin Highway 96 =

State highway in Wisconsin, United States

State Trunk Highway 96
- WIS-96 highlighted in red

Route information
- Maintained by WisDOT
- Length: 55.94 mi (90.03 km)

Major junctions
- West end: US 10 / WIS 110 / CTH-II near Fremont
- US 45 in Caledonia; I-41 / US 41 in Grand Chute
- East end: I-43 / CTH-KB in Denmark

Location
- Country: United States
- State: Wisconsin
- Counties: Waupaca, Outagamie, Brown

Highway system
- Wisconsin State Trunk Highway System; Interstate; US; State; Scenic; Rustic
← WIS 95	→ WIS 97

State Trunk Highway 96 (often called Highway 96, STH-96 or WIS 96) is a state highway in the U.S. state of Wisconsin. It runs east–west in east-central Wisconsin from near Fremont to Denmark.

== Route description ==
Starting at US 10 (exit 267) interchange, WIS 96 and WIS 110 begin to travel northward from CTH-II as a four-lane divided road. Shortly after that, WIS 96 turns east as a two-lane undivided road while WIS 110 turns west. Going east, WIS 96 meets Readfield, US 45 at a roundabout, Dale, and Medina. Then, it meets WIS 76 just northwest of the Appleton International Airport. Then, it meets I-41/US 41 at a diamond interchange. In Appleton, it then meets WIS 47. Just at the eastern city limit, it then passes under WIS 441 north of the Fox River.

At this point, WIS 96 parallels the Fox River. The route then travels through Little Chute, Kaukauna, and Wrightstown. Past Wrightstown, the route no longer parallels the Fox River. In Greenleaf, the route intersects with WIS 32. Between Lark and Shirley, WIS 96 travels northward. Then, it travels eastward to Denmark. At the village limit of Denmark, WIS 96 ends at I-43 at a diamond interchange.

== Major intersections ==
County	Location	mi	km	Destinations	Notes
Waupaca	Town of Fremont	0.00	0.00	US 10 – Waupaca, Stevens Point, Appleton WIS 110 ends CTH-II east	Southern end of WIS 110 concurrency; roadway continues southward as CTH-II
Waupaca	Town of Fremont	0.73	1.17	WIS 110 north – Fremont	Northern end of WIS 110 concurrency
Waupaca	Town of Caledonia	4.85	7.81	CTH-W	
Waupaca–Outagamie county line	Caledonia–Dale town line	6.36	10.24	US 45 – New London, Oshkosh	
Outagamie	Town of Dale	9.38	15.10	CTH-T	
Outagamie	Town of Dale	11.40	18.35	CTH-M	
Outagamie	Town of Greenville	16.40	26.39	WIS 76 – Greenville, Shiocton, Oshkosh	
Outagamie	Town of Greenville	17.91	28.82	CTH-CB	
Outagamie	Town of Grand Chute	19.94– 19.96	32.09– 32.12	I-41 / US 41 – Green Bay, Oshkosh, Milwaukee	
Outagamie	Town of Grand Chute	20.43	32.88	CTH-AA (Bluemound Dr)	
Outagamie	Appleton	22.43	36.10	WIS 47 (Richmond St) – Shawano, Menasha	
Outagamie	Little Chute	27.40	44.10	CTH-N	
Outagamie	Kaukauna	30.12	48.47	WIS 55 south (Lawe St) – Sherwood, Fond du Lac	Western end of WIS 55 concurrency
Outagamie	Kaukauna	30.56	49.18	WIS 55 north (Delanglade St) – Seymour CTH-J north (Lawe St)	Eastern end of WIS 55 concurrency
Outagamie	Town of Kaukauna	33.02	53.14	CTH-JJ	
Outagamie–Brown county line	Kaukauna–Wrightstown village line	34.86	56.10	CTH-U	
Brown	Wrightstown	36.20	58.26	CTH-D	
Brown	Wrightstown	36.43	58.63	CTH-ZZ	
Brown	Wrightstown	40.16	64.63	WIS 32 / WIS 57 – Green Bay, Chilton	
Brown	Wrightstown	41.43	66.68	CTH-PP	
Brown	Town of Morrison	44.47	71.57	CTH-W	
Brown	Town of Morrison	47.43	76.33	CTH-G	
Brown	Town of New Denmark	53.89	86.73	CTH-X	
Brown	Denmark	55.86– 55.94	89.90– 90.03	I-43 – Green Bay, Milwaukee CTH-KB east	Eastern terminus; roadway continues eastward as CTH-KB
1.000 mi = 1.609 km; 1.000 km = 0.621 mi: Concurrency terminus
