= Greenleaf, Wisconsin =

Census-designated place in Wisconsin, United States

- village
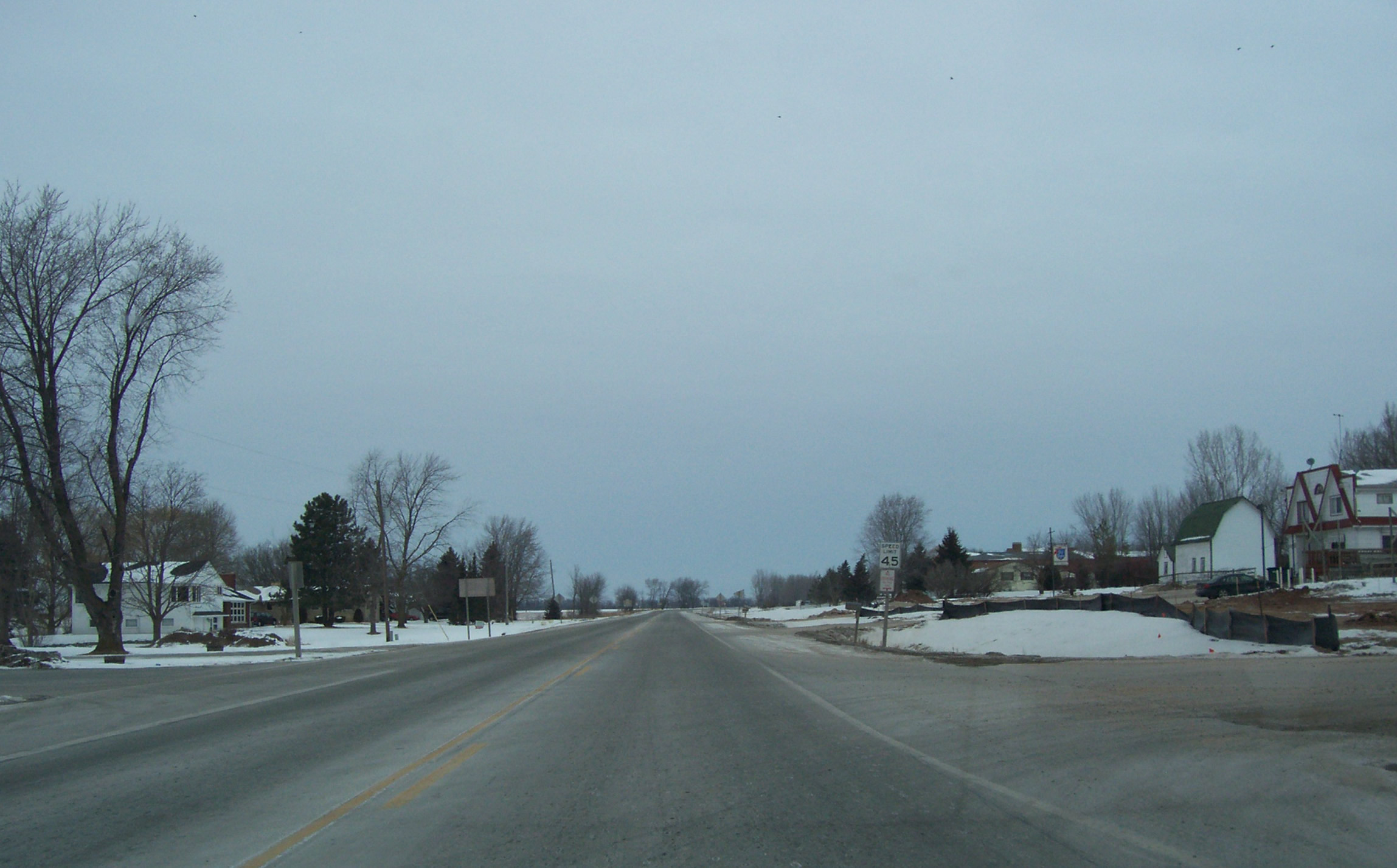
- Looking north at the north side of Greenleaf on Wisconsin highways 32 and 57

- Location in Brown County and the state of Wisconsin.
- Coordinates: 44°18′48″N 88°05′46″W
- Country: United States
- State: Wisconsin
- County: Brown
- Town: Wrightstown

Area
  - Total: 1.042 sq mi (2.70 km^{2})
  - Land: 1.042 sq mi (2.70 km^{2})
  - Water: 0 sq mi (0 km^{2})
- Elevation: 712 ft (217 m)

Population (2010)
  - Total: 607
  - Density: 583/sq mi (225/km^{2})
- Time zone: UTC-6 (Central (CST))
  - Summer (DST): UTC-5 (CDT)
- Area code: 920
- GNIS feature ID: 1565848

Greenleaf is a village in Brown County, Wisconsin, United States, in the town of Wrightstown.

As of the 2020 census, Greenleaf had a population of 733.

== History ==
As of the 2010 census it had a population of 607. Greenleaf was named for Emery B. Greenleaf, the general manager of the Milwaukee & Northern railroad at the time the Greenleaf post office was established in 1873.

=== Incorporation as a Village ===
In 2020, 800 residents of the community petitioned the state of Wisconsin to become a village. The Wisconsin Incorporation Review Board denied the petition's "characteristics of the territory" requirement as the petition included two separate areas: one in the vicinity of a roundabout of state highways WIS 57 and Wisconsin Highway 96 and another isolated area to the east of the Niagara Escarpment. The second area is isolated from the first by the escarpment, a quarry and vacant lands.

A revised proposal was approved on April 13, 2022.

== Geography ==
The community is located at the intersection of Wisconsin Highways 57/32 and 96. It uses ZIP code 54126. Greenleaf has an area of 1.042 square miles (2.70 km^{2}), all land. The community is part of the Green Bay Metropolitan Statistical Area.

== Images ==
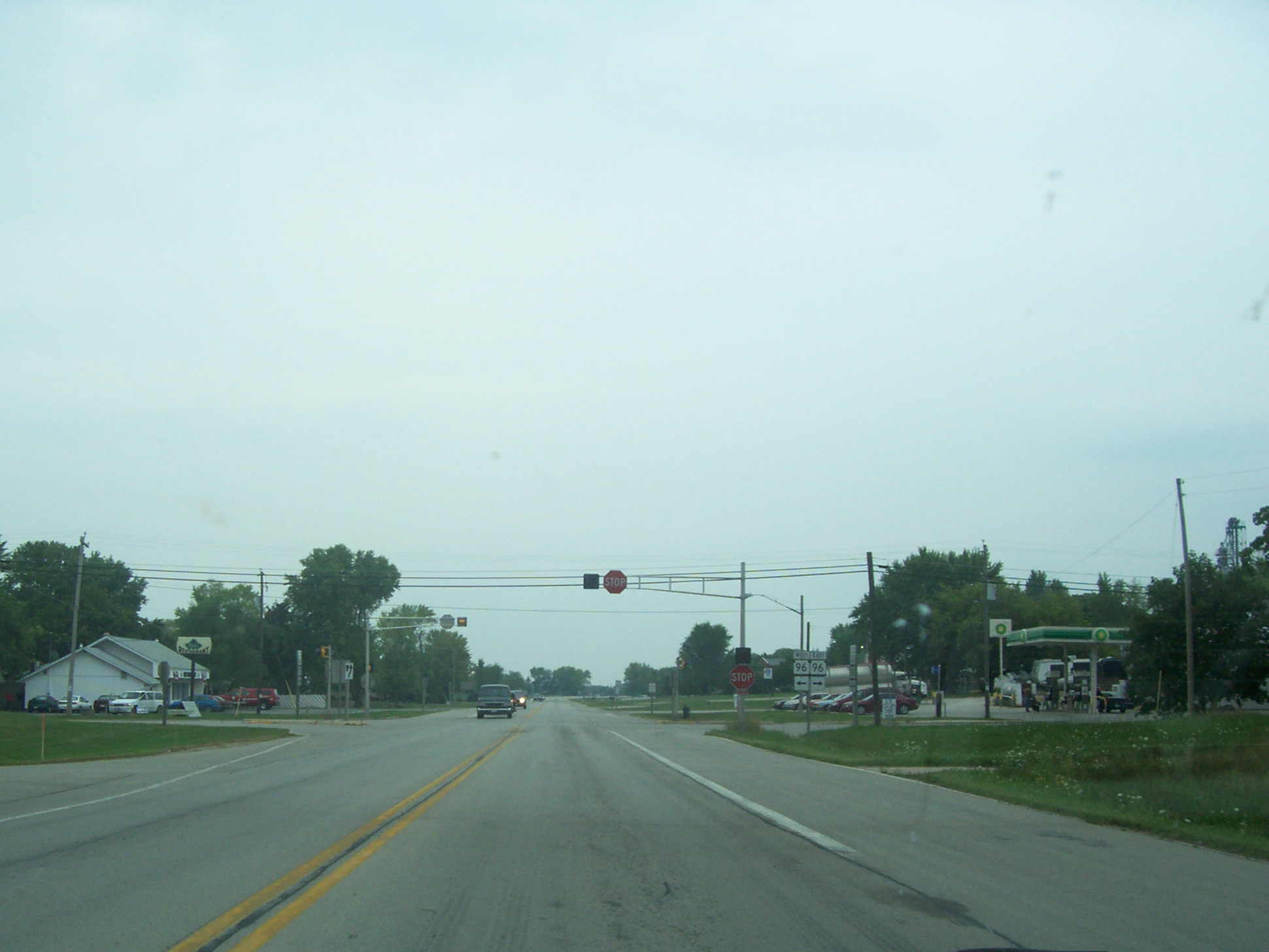
Looking north at the intersection of Wisconsin Highways 57/32 and 96 in Greenleaf

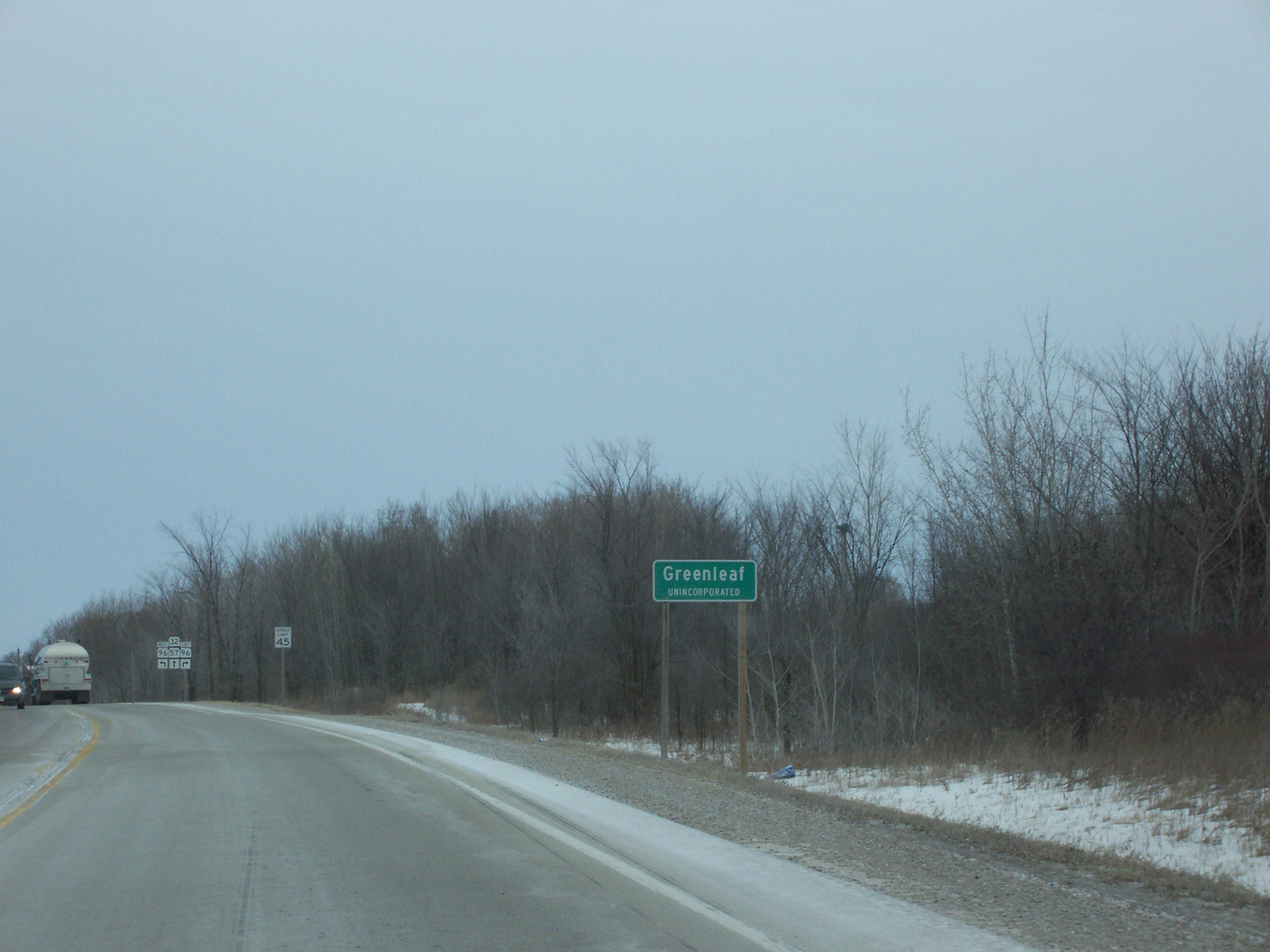
The sign for Greenleaf

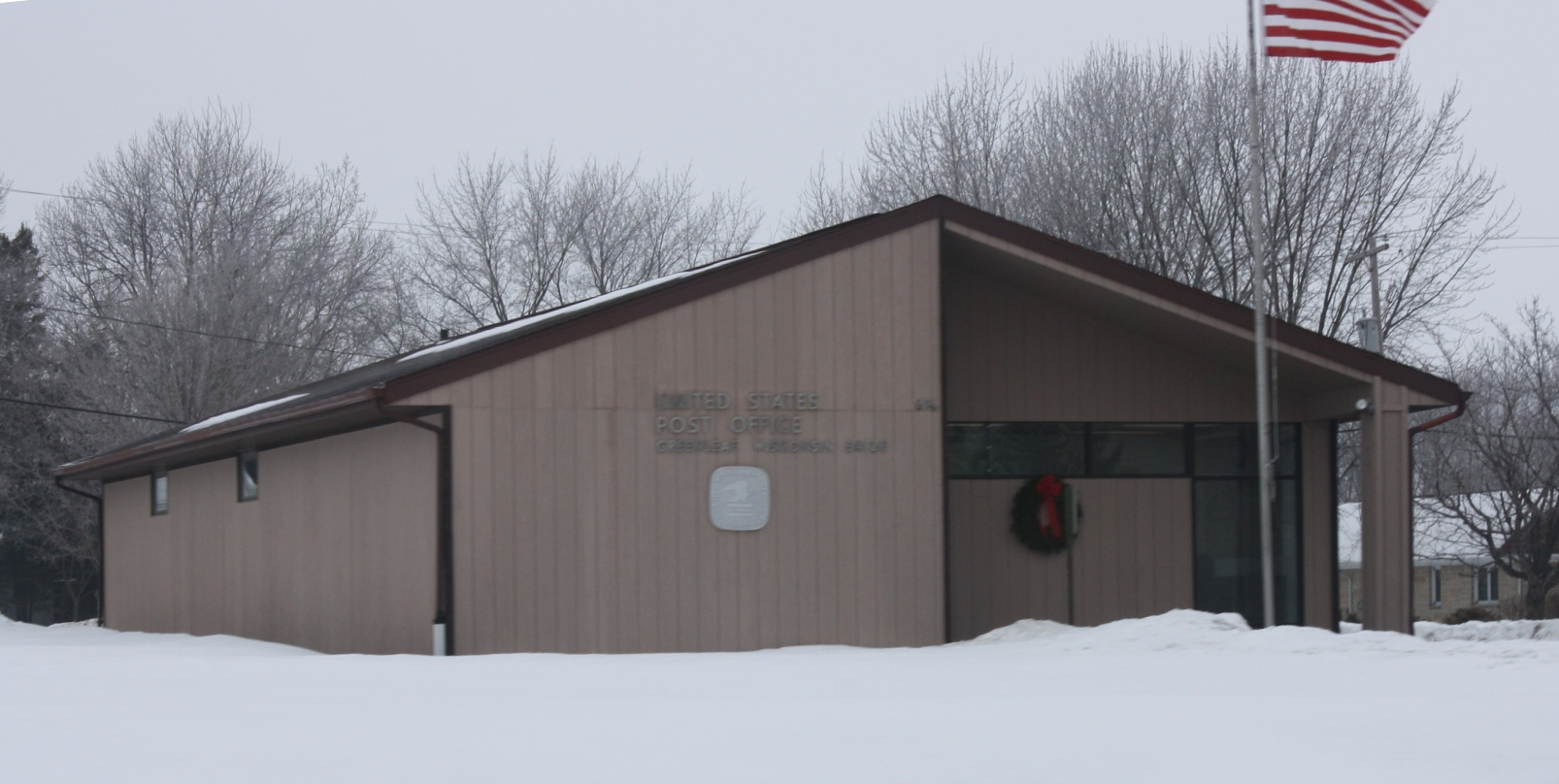
Greenleaf Post office

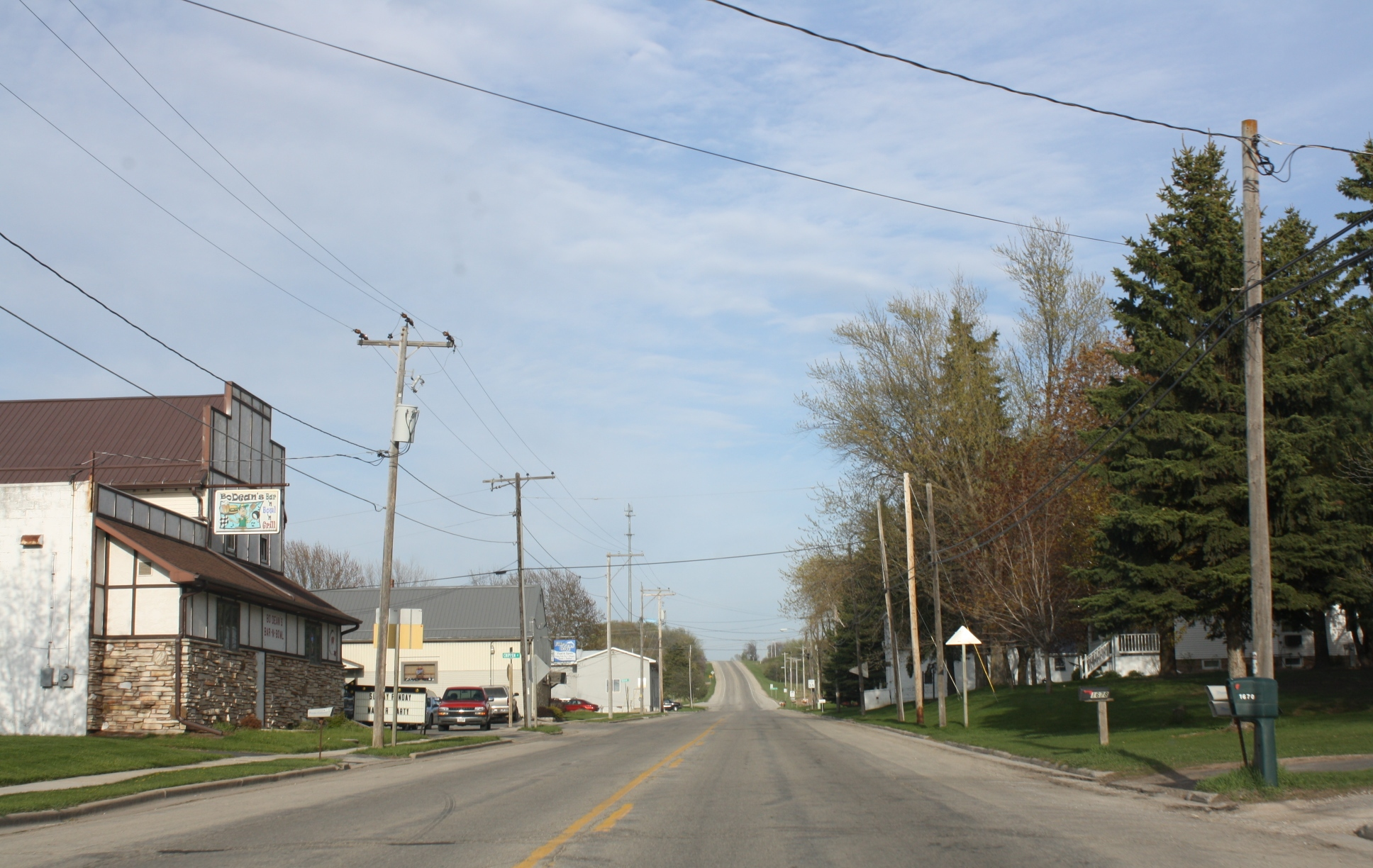
Looking east at Greenleaf along WIS 96

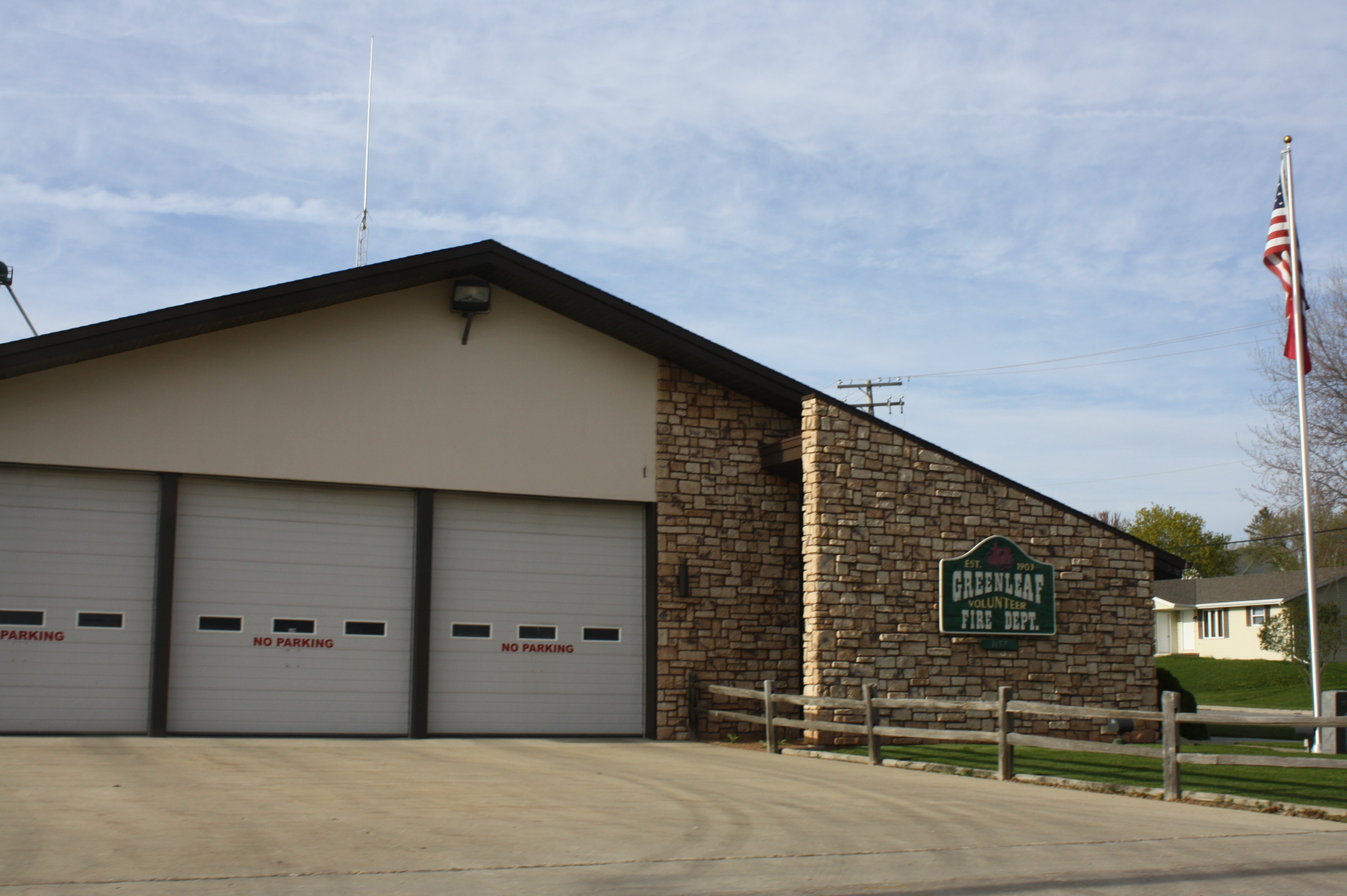
Greenleaf Fire department
