= Lark, Wisconsin =

- Unincorporated community
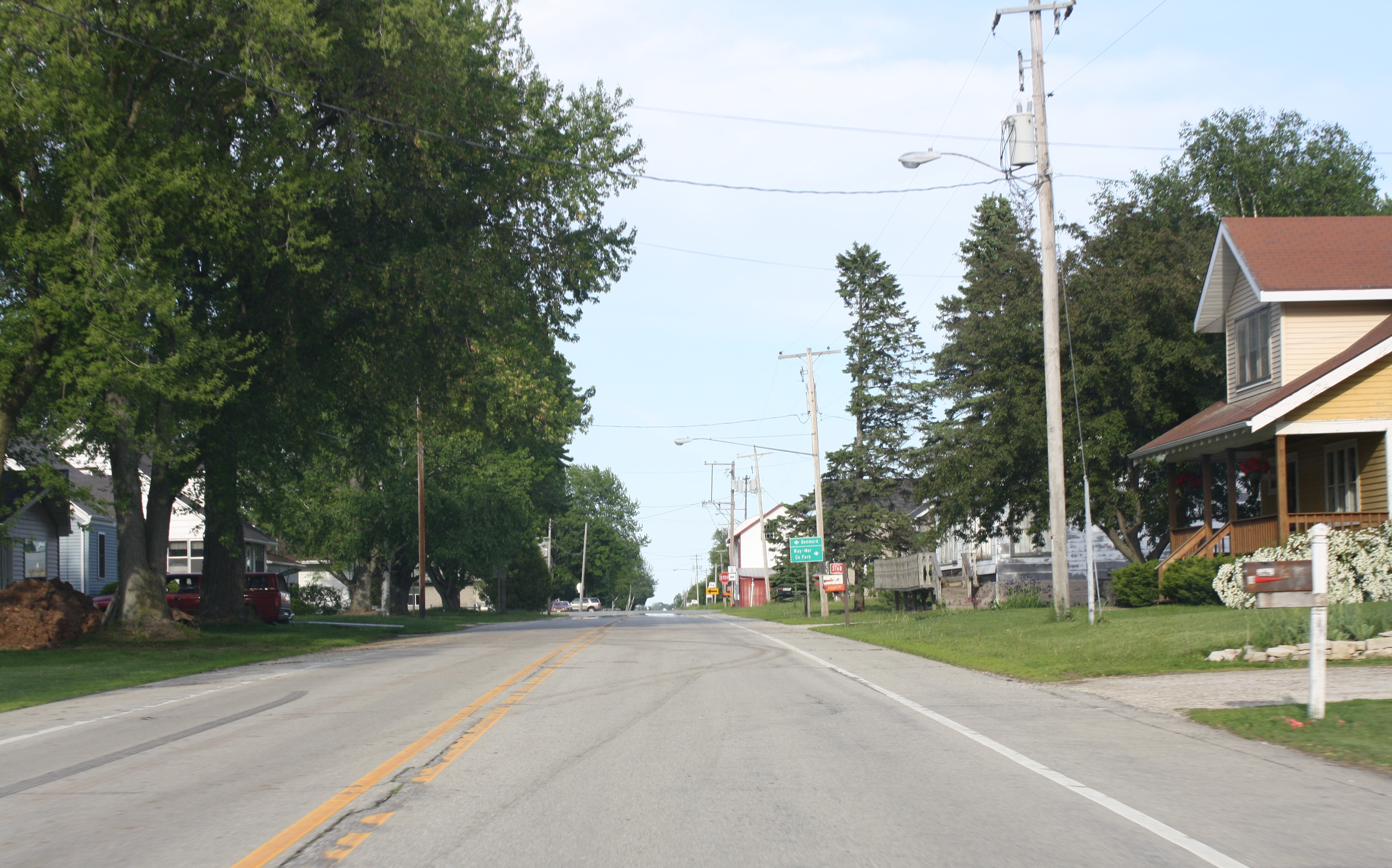
- Looking east at Lark

- Location within Wisconsin Location within the United States
- Coordinates: 44°18′51″N 87°56′59″W
- Country: United States
- State: Wisconsin
- County: Brown
- Town: Morrison
- Elevation: 922 ft (281 m)
- Time zone: UTC-6 (Central (CST))
  - Summer (DST): UTC-5 (CDT)
- Area code: 920
- GNIS feature ID: 1567848

Lark is an unincorporated community in the town of Morrison, Brown County, Wisconsin, United States. It is located on Wisconsin Highway 96.

== Images ==
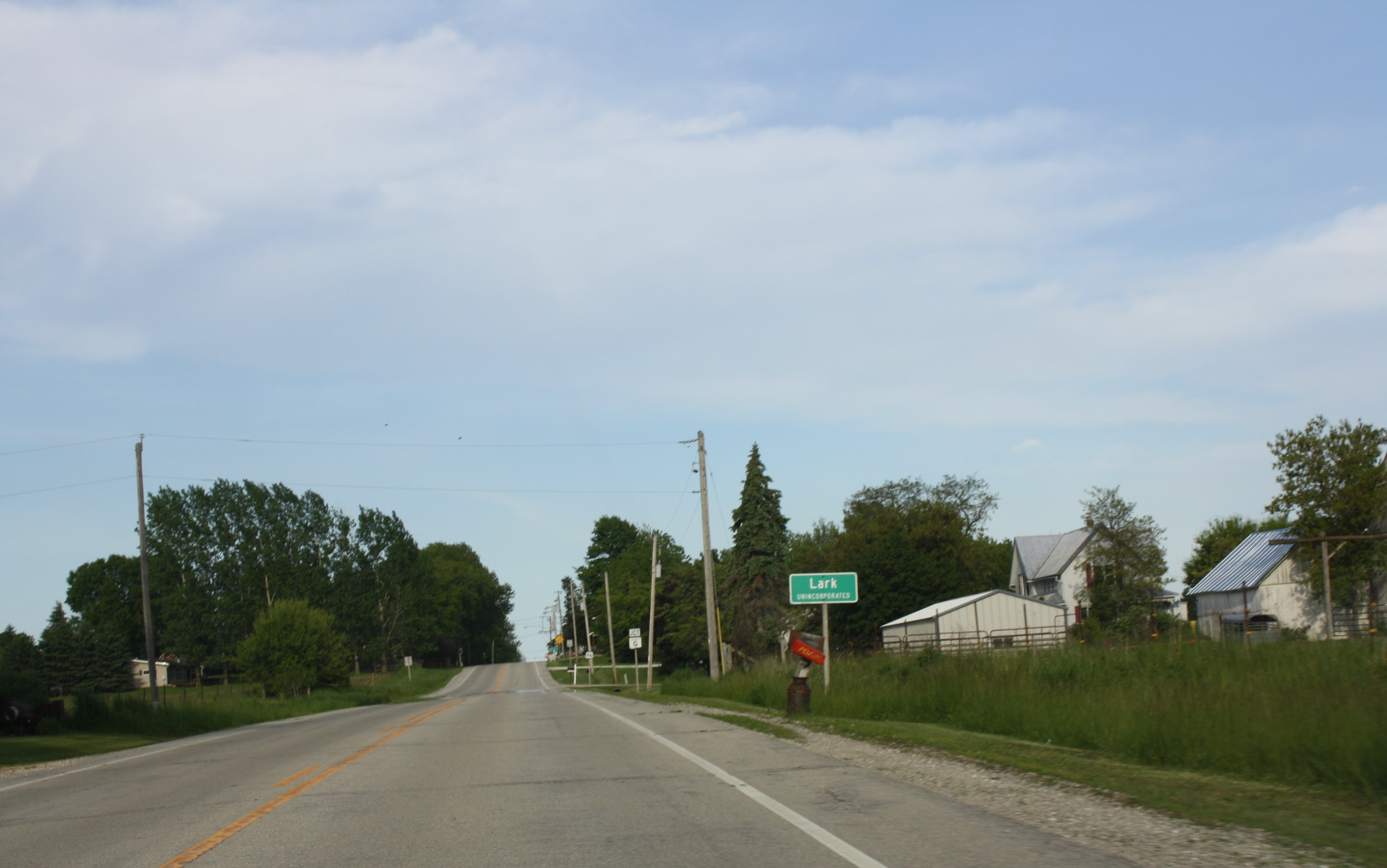
Looking east at Lark

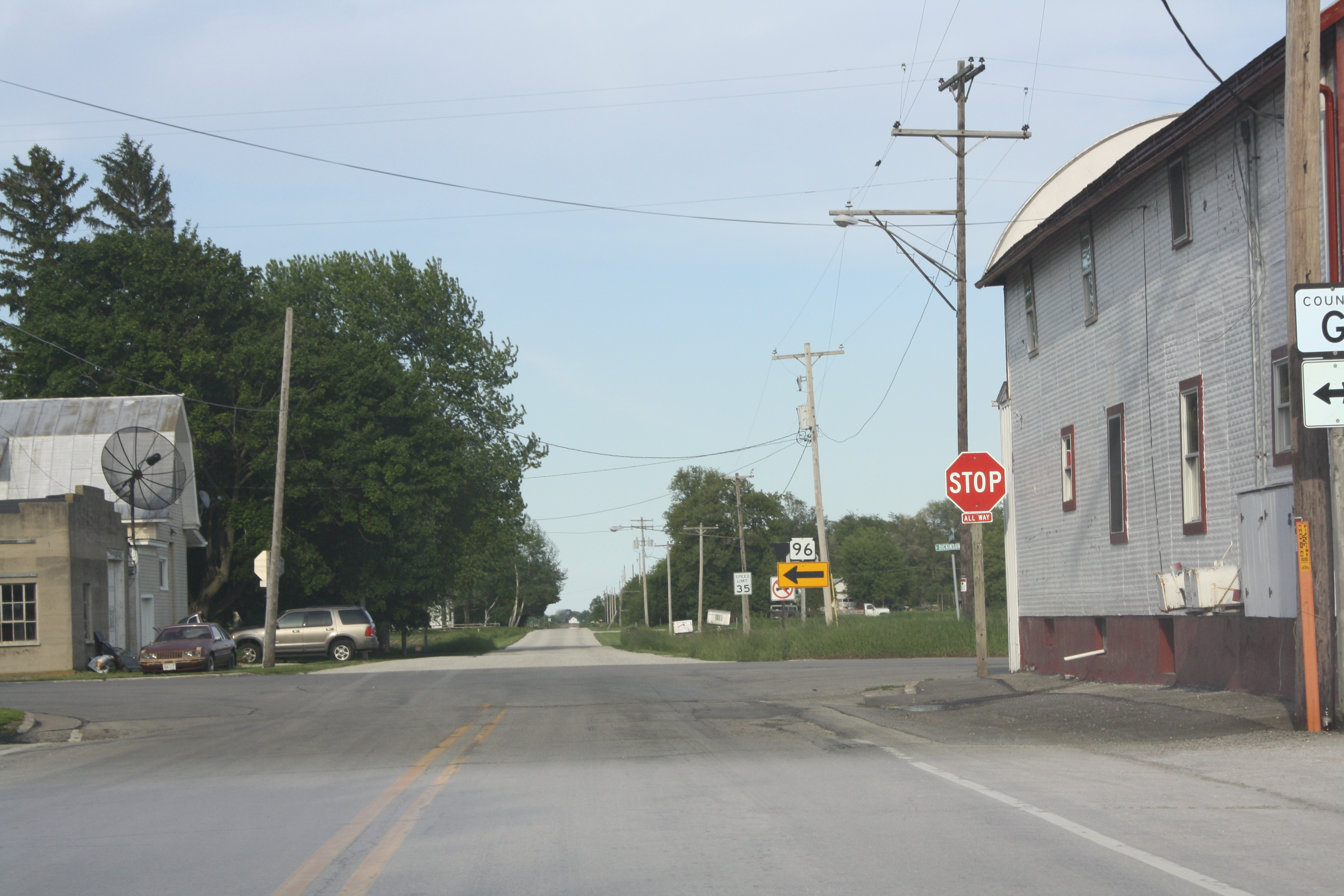
Looking east at downtown Lark
