= Readfield, Wisconsin =

- Unincorporated community
- Location within Wisconsin Location within the United States
- Coordinates: 44°16′21″N 88°46′11″W
- Country: United States
- State: Wisconsin
- County: Waupaca
- Elevation: 876 ft (267 m)
- Time zone: UTC-6 (Central (CST))
  - Summer (DST): UTC-5 (CDT)
- ZIP code: 54969
- Area code: 920
- GNIS feature ID: 1572120

Readfield is an unincorporated community in Waupaca County, Wisconsin, United States. Readfield is located on Wisconsin Highway 96 east of Fremont, in the town of Caledonia. Waupaca County Trunk Highways H and W pass through Readfield.

Readfield has a post office with ZIP code 54969.

== History ==
Zion Evangelical Lutheran Church stated intentions to build a church in Readfield in 1902. It still has a church there as of 2017.

Readfield was on the original path of the transcontinental Yellowstone Trail auto trail, established in 1915. This highway through Readfield was first given the numerical designation State Trunk Highway 18 in 1917, which in turn was changed to U.S. Route 10 in 1926.

Construction began on the roadway which would become Waupaca County Highway W in the summer of 1928. The highway connects New London and Readfield.

Telephone service for Readfield was provided for decades, at least as early as the 1930s, by the Larsen-Readfield Telephone Company. The company was purchased by Century Telephone of La Crosse in 1989. Century Telephone, now CenturyLink, still had the named subsidiary CenturyTel of Larsen-Readfield, LLC as late as 2013.

In October 1960, the New London Board of Education approved the construction of a school to be built in Readfield. It was slated for occupancy, and its first year, in September 1961, prepared to serve approximately 220 students. Smaller schools south of New London under the district's control (with the exception of the three-room Dale school) were to be closed and consolidated into Readfield when it opened. Ultimately, Dale School was closed in the late 1960s, and it K-3 students folded into Readfield's as well.

Many of Readfield's businesses closed in 1982 when U.S. Route 10 through the community was straightened as part of a safety upgrade. The highway upgrades included curb and gutter for much of Readfield along U.S. 10, and for a reroute of County Road H to avoid a three-way intersection with County Roads W and U.S. 10. The highway changes meant the closure of Vic & Myrts' Supper Club, and Hanneman's Grocery Store and Rec Center. It left four businesses at that time, three of which were taverns. The fourth was a small variety store.

On December 5, 2003, the primary route through Readfield changed the designation from U.S. Route 10 to Wisconsin Highway 96, when the new divided highway for U.S. 10 between Greenville and Fremont was completed.
