= Rawhide Boys Ranch =

Non-profit organization

Coordinates: 44.3118°N 88.8507°W

Rawhide Youth Services
- Founded: 1965
- Founders: John and Jan Gillespie; Bart and Cherry Starr
- Legal status: 501(c)(3) Nonprofit Organization
- Purpose: Child Treatment, Residential Treatment Programs, Alternative Education, Counseling
- Location: Town of Caledonia, Waupaca County, Wisconsin, USA
- Website: Rawhide.org

Rawhide Youth Services is a faith-based non-profit organization established in 1965. Its campus is located south of New London, Wisconsin, in the Town of Caledonia, Waupaca County, Wisconsin, United States. It provides residential programs for at-risk and troubled boys as well as outpatient mental health services dedicated to helping at-risk youth and their families lead healthy, responsible lives.

== History ==
=== Early years: 1965–1983 ===
Rawhide was established in 1965 by John and Jan Gillespie, who purchased the 714-acre (2.89 km^{2}) plot along the Wolf River near New London in 1965. They opened the ranch and took in their first eight boys.

In 1967 Rawhide incorporated summer only boys programs, treating up to 300 boys a year.

Rawhide ran its own fire department beginning in 1967 that also served the Town of Caledonia. It was one of only 10 such fire corporations in the state of Wisconsin. The boys were actively involved although they were given a separate ride to the fire scenes since they could not ride the fire equipment. In 1969 the Rawhide Fire Department responded to approximately 28 grass and woods fires in and off the Rawhide property.

==== Bart and Cherry Starr ====
John and Jan Gillespie were thinking about starting a group home for troubled boys and heard that the Starrs had a similar idea. John found their phone number in the phone book and called them up. They then met and the Starrs agreed to help the Gillespies start up Rawhide. Bart was the chairman of the fundraising drive to pay Rawhide's mortgage. Seventeen other members of the 1966 Green Bay Packers team, including Fred "Fuzzy" Thurston, Jerry Kramer, and Jim Taylor, joined in to help raise $20,000. Bart Starr also donated a red 1968 Chevrolet Corvette he had won for his performance in the Super Bowl to be raffled. The raffle raised over $40,000 for the Ranch. Ronald Kent, of Larson, Wisconsin won the drawing from over 45,000 entries.

Starr led additional fundraising efforts, and helped kickoff the vehicle donation program by sending out a letter across the country. He also was the host and narrator of the TV commercials for the vehicle donation program. For his 37 years of service with Rawhide, Bart Starr was presented with the AMVETS Humanitarian Award in 2003. Previous winners include John McCain, Barbara Bush, Rosalynn Carter, Nancy Reagan, Hillary Clinton, and Roy Rogers and Dale Evans.

=== Program expansion: 1983–2011 ===
The vehicle program allowed Rawhide to expand again, and they began treating 20 boys a year in 1984. Capacity by 1991 was 30 boys a year. The Rawhide School was renamed the Starr Academy in 1991 in honor of the support Bart and Cherry Starr had provided over the years.

In 1993 Rawhide opened its fourth residence, expanding capacity to 40 boys a year, and in 1994 also opened their first foster home, in the Appleton area, to help with the transition from the Ranch.

Rawhide expanded again, opening its fifth residence house in December 1996. Rawhide began its About Face program, a 4-month military-style discipline program, in 1997. A barn fire on Christmas Eve in 1999 destroyed four horses. Donations surpassed the cost to rebuild the barn, and the excess donations were used to start a new program focusing on younger boys, Rawhide's Equine Assisted Program, utilizing therapeutic horseback riding. The new psychotherapy program focused on using interactions between the boy, a counselor, his parents, and a horse to improve communications and relationships.

The first Rawhide program designed for boys not under court supervision, the Academy Program, began in 2003. The program focused on helping boys not yet in, but on their way to, serious trouble get their high school diploma and begin post-secondary education.

=== Honors ===
The ranch was named one of 37 winners of George H. W. Bush's annual 1000 Points of Light citations in 1991, selected from among over 4,500 nominations and was now home to 33 boys. On December 5, 2002, the City of Neenah Mayor George Scherck honored Rawhide by declaring it Rawhide Appreciation Day throughout the city. The award was honored to Rawhide because of their long standing history of working with young people, benefiting all communities in Wisconsin, and working diligently to paint the Oak Street Bridge in Neenah.

Wisconsin Governor Jim Doyle dedicated the eight-person Cornerstone Group Home in 2004. This was the first residence at Rawhide not to use house parents, leaving the boys with more autonomy. In 2008 Rawhide opened its first outpatient clinic, in Green Bay. Two more outpatient clinics were opened in 2009, one in Menasha, and one on the Rawhide campus in New London.

== Car donation program ==
The auto, truck, boat and real estate donation program began in 1983. Rawhide initially hoped to receive one vehicle a week, but was averaging 20 vehicles a week 6 months later. By 1986 donations were estimated at 3,500 vehicle and real estate donations a year. In 1991 Rawhide moved from picking up cars directly or having them dropped off at Rawhide to an auto dealer drop-off network with more than 250 drop-off locations throughout Wisconsin. The vehicle drop-off network was expanded into the Chicago area in 1993. By 1995 the vehicle donation program was receiving over seven thousand vehicles each year and reached 8,000 in 1996. By 1997 the program was pulling in 11,000 car, truck, boat and real estate donations.

Many cars are still processed and inspected on the grounds. From there they go to wholesale dealer auctions or are sold through the Rawhide eBay store.

== Ranch programs ==
The ranch receives funding from referring counties and parents, as well as from donations. This includes donations of automobiles, which Chicago dealers accept on the ranch's behalf.

The ranch's programs include working with horses and other animals. The ranch also has two vehicle centers that allow for preparation of donated vehicles for auction, as well as offering work experience. Volunteers from the ranch at times provide labor to help other organizations in the area, such as cleaning and painting a transitional living facility in the city of Waupaca or helping with the cleaning efforts in the city of Waupun after a severe storm.

Rawhide is currently a member of: the Wisconsin Association of Family and Children's Agencies (WAFCA), the Wisconsin Association of Child & Youth Care Professionals (WACYCP) and the Alliance for Children and Families (ACF).

== Controversies ==
In 1982, Wisconsin passed the nation's first LGBT anti-discrimination bill, outlawing discrimination based on sexual orientation. This conflicted with Rawhide's faith-based treatment programs, which were partially based on hiring Christian married couples made up of a man and woman to create a traditional home environment. Then-Governor Lee S. Dreyfus, who signed the bill in 1982, sent a letter to the Wisconsin Senate saying he would not have signed the bill if he knew how it would affect operations such as Rawhide. "I feel somewhat used," Dreyfus wrote, claiming to have specifically inquired about such effects when he was deciding whether to sign the bill.

In 1987, State Senator Joe Leann, 14th District (Waupaca), introduced a bill, SB 301/AB 527 (commonly called the "Rawhide Act" or "Rawhide Amendment"), to amend the state's civil rights laws to permit faith-based non-profit institutions to discriminate on grounds of sexual orientation, marital status, or religion. The bill (which then Speaker pro tempore David Clarenbach conceded may have had sufficient support to pass) was replaced by a different bill, AB 916, which created limited exemptions to allow religious associations to "grant preferential hiring treatment to members of their own creed." Clarenbach also said the new bill would conform Wisconsin state law to the US Supreme Court decision Corporation of Presiding Bishops vs. Amos, 483 U.S. 327 (1987). In this case, the Court ruled 9-0 to uphold a provision of Section 702 of the Civil Rights Act of 1964 exempting activities of religious organizations from the religious discrimination protections of the Act.

In 1997, a former Rawhide counselor was fired and convicted of repeated sexual assaults on two boys who were residents at the Ranch.
