= Sniderville, Wisconsin =

- Unincorporated community
- Location within Wisconsin Location within the United States
- Coordinates: 44°21′06″N 88°11′28″W
- Country: United States
- State: Wisconsin
- Counties: Brown, Outagamie
- Towns: Wrightstown, Kaukauna
- Elevation: 676 ft (206 m)
- Time zone: UTC-6 (Central (CST))
  - Summer (DST): UTC-5 (CDT)
- Area code: 920
- GNIS feature ID: 1577828

Sniderville is an unincorporated community located in the towns of Wrightstown and Kaukauna in Brown and Outagamie counties, Wisconsin, United States. It is located on U.S. Route 41/Interstate 41 near Brown County Trunk DDD and Brown County Trunk U. It was named by and for John Snider, who came from Cayuga County, New York to establish the post office in 1859.
