= Kaukauna (town), Wisconsin =

Kaukauna, Wisconsin
- Town
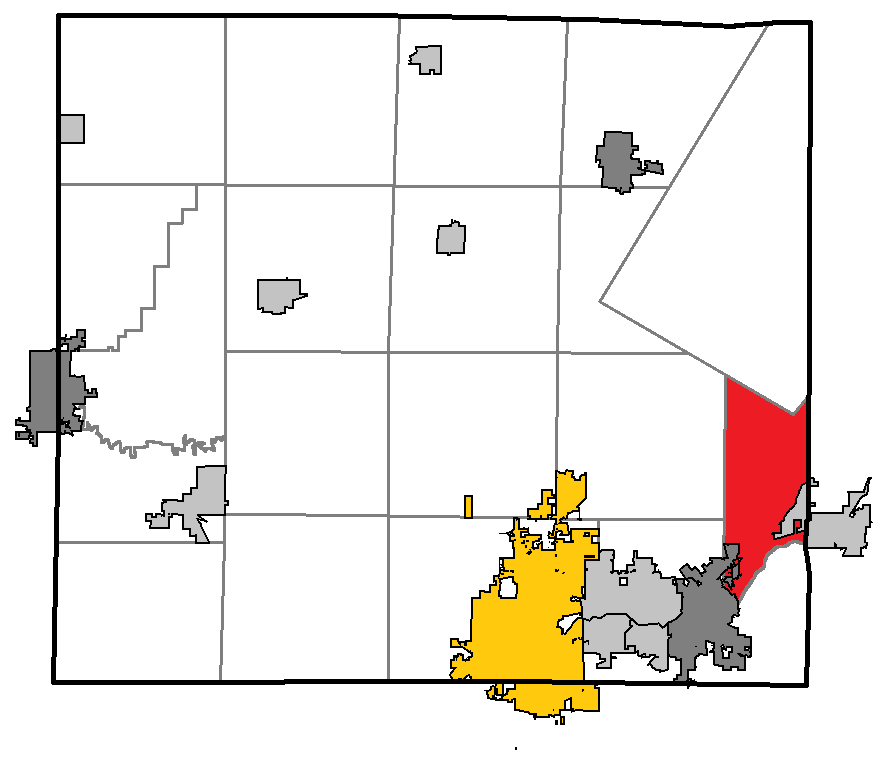
- Location of the town of Kaukauna, within Outagamie County Map
- Coordinates: 44°20′N 88°13′W
- Country: United States
- State: Wisconsin
- County: Outagamie
- Organized: April 7, 1842

Area
  - Total: 18.1 sq mi (46.8 km^{2})
  - Land: 17.8 sq mi (46.0 km^{2})
  - Water: 0.31 sq mi (0.8 km^{2})
- Elevation: 679 ft (207 m)

Population (2020)
  - Total: 1,306
  - Density: 73.5/sq mi (28.4/km^{2})
- Time zone: UTC-6 (Central (CST))
  - Summer (DST): UTC-5 (CDT)
- Area code: 920
- FIPS code: 55-38825
- GNIS feature ID: 1583464
- Website: https://townofkaukauna.com/

Kaukauna is a town in Outagamie County, Wisconsin, United States. The population was 1,306 at the 2020 census. The unincorporated community of Sniderville is located partially in the town.

== History ==
The Town of Kaukauna, originally named Kaukaulan (though other sources have more rarely referred to it in its earliest days as Grand Kaukalan or [Grand] Cacalin) organized as a town on April 7, 1842. At the time of its formation, it was wholly a part of Brown County; Outagamie County would not be formed until 1851. The town originally comprised all of future Outagamie County, and parts of Brown County around Wrightstown.

As settlers arrived, the Towns of Grand Chute and Lansing were split off from Kaukauna in 1849. The 1849 split left Kaukauna to administer its present-day Town area, all of the area comprising the Town of Vandenbroek, and portions of the present-day Town of Buchanan. The portion which went to the Town of Buchanan was portioned off in 1858. In 1885, the adjacent City of Kaukauna was removed from the town when it incorporated. The last major change was the Town of Vandenbroek divided off in 1902 into a new township, giving the Town of Kaukauna its rough size as it exists today. On February 28, 2002, further parts of the town were annexed by Wrightstown.

== Geography ==
According to the United States Census Bureau, in 2021 the town had a total area of 18.1 square miles (46.8 km^{2}), of which 17.8 square miles (46.0 km^{2}) is land and 0.3 square mile (0.8 km^{2}) (1.66%) is water.

== Demographics ==
As of the census of 2021, there were 17,170 people, 10,652 households, and 14,898 families residing in the town. The population density was 213.8 people per square mile (176.7/km^{2}). There were 4,524 housing units at an average density of 30.1 persons/km^{2} (21.3 persons/sq mi). The racial makeup of the town was 97.55% White, 0.09% African American, 1.93% Native American, 0.09% Asian, 0.00% Pacific Islander, 0.00% from other races, and 0.35% from two or more races. 0.53% of the population were Hispanic or Latino of any race.

There were 370 households, out of which 44.1% had children under the age of 18 living with them, 75.9% were married couples living together, 4.3% have a woman whose husband does not live with her, and 15.9% were non-families. 12.4% of all households were made up of individuals, and 3.5% had someone living alone who was 65 years of age or older. The average household size was 3.02 and the average family size was 3.32.

In the town, the population was spread out, with 31.1% under the age of 18, 6.5% from 18 to 24, 30.5% from 25 to 44, 22.4% from 45 to 64, and 9.5% who were 65 years of age or older. The median age was 36 years. For every 100 females, there were 100.7 males. For every 100 females age 18 and over, there were 98.2 males.

The median income for a household in the town was $61,696, and the median income for a family was $63,625. Males had a median income of $41,010 versus $26,111 for females. The per capita income for the town was $20,881. 1.7% of the population and 1.0% of families were below the poverty line. Out of the total people living in poverty, 2.7% are under the age of 18 and 0.0% are 65 or older.

== Notable people ==
- Anton M. Miller, Wisconsin farmer and politician, lived in the town
- William M. Rohan, Wisconsin farmer and politician, was chairman and treasurer of the town
