= Caledonia, Waupaca County, Wisconsin =

Caledonia, Wisconsin
- Town
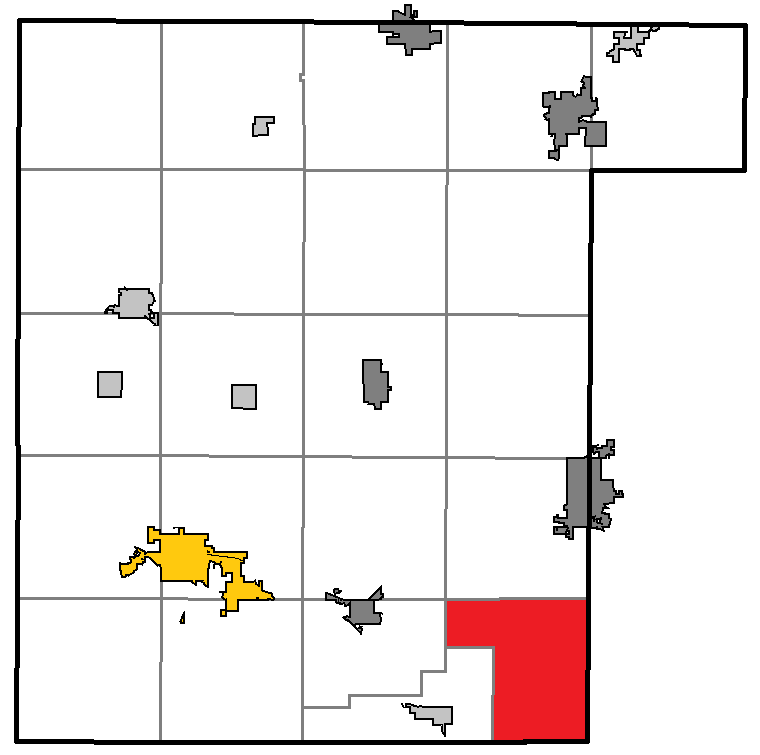
- Location of Caledonia, within Waupaca County
- Coordinates: 44°17′29″N 88°48′17″W
- Country: United States
- State: Wisconsin
- County: Waupaca

Area
  - Total: 28.1 sq mi (72.7 km^{2})
  - Land: 27.8 sq mi (72.1 km^{2})
  - Water: 0.23 sq mi (0.6 km^{2})
- Elevation: 797 ft (243 m)

Population (2020)
  - Total: 1,712
  - Density: 61.5/sq mi (23.7/km^{2})
- Time zone: UTC-6 (Central (CST))
  - Summer (DST): UTC-5 (CDT)
- FIPS code: 55-12000
- GNIS feature ID: 1582906
- Website: http://townofcaledonia.com/

Caledonia is a town in Waupaca County, Wisconsin, United States. The population was 1,712 at the 2020 census. The unincorporated communities of North Readfield and Readfield are located in the town.

== Education ==
The campus of the nonprofit Rawhide Boys Ranch is located inside the Town of Caledonia.

== Geography ==
According to the United States Census Bureau, the town has a total area of 28.1 square miles (72.7 km^{2}), of which 27.9 square miles (72.1 km^{2}) is land and 0.2 square mile (0.6 km^{2}) (0.78%) is water.

== Demographics ==
As of the census of 2000, there were 1,466 people, 73 households, and 58 families residing in the town. The population density was 52.6 people per square mile (20.3/km^{2}). There were 518 housing units at an average density of 18.6 per square mile (7.2/km^{2}). The racial makeup of the town was 98.23% White, 1.09% African American, 0.20% Native American, 0.20% Asian, 0.07% Pacific Islander, and 0.20% from two or more races. Hispanic or Latino of any race were 1.02% of the population.

There were 504 households, out of which 36.5% had children under the age of 18 living with them, 73.2% were married couples living together, 3.2% had a female householder with no husband present, and 19.8% were non-families. 14.9% of all households were made up of individuals, and 5.0% had someone living alone who was 65 years of age or older. The average household size was 2.75 and the average family size was 3.08.

In the town, the population was spread out, with 29.1% under the age of 18, 7.3% from 18 to 24, 30.2% from 25 to 44, 25.9% from 45 to 64, and 7.6% who were 65 years of age or older. The median age was 38 years. For every 100 females, there were 112.5 males. For every 100 females age 18 and over, there were 101.7 males.

The median income for a household in the town was $53,977, and the median income for a family was $60,292. Males had a median income of $39,318 versus $24,900 for females. The per capita income for the town was $21,702. About 1.5% of families and 2.1% of the population were below the poverty line, including 0.8% of those under age 18 and 5.0% of those age 65 or over.
