= Wrightstown (town), Wisconsin =

Town in Brown County, Wisconsin

Wrightstown, Wisconsin
- Town
- Town of Wrightstown
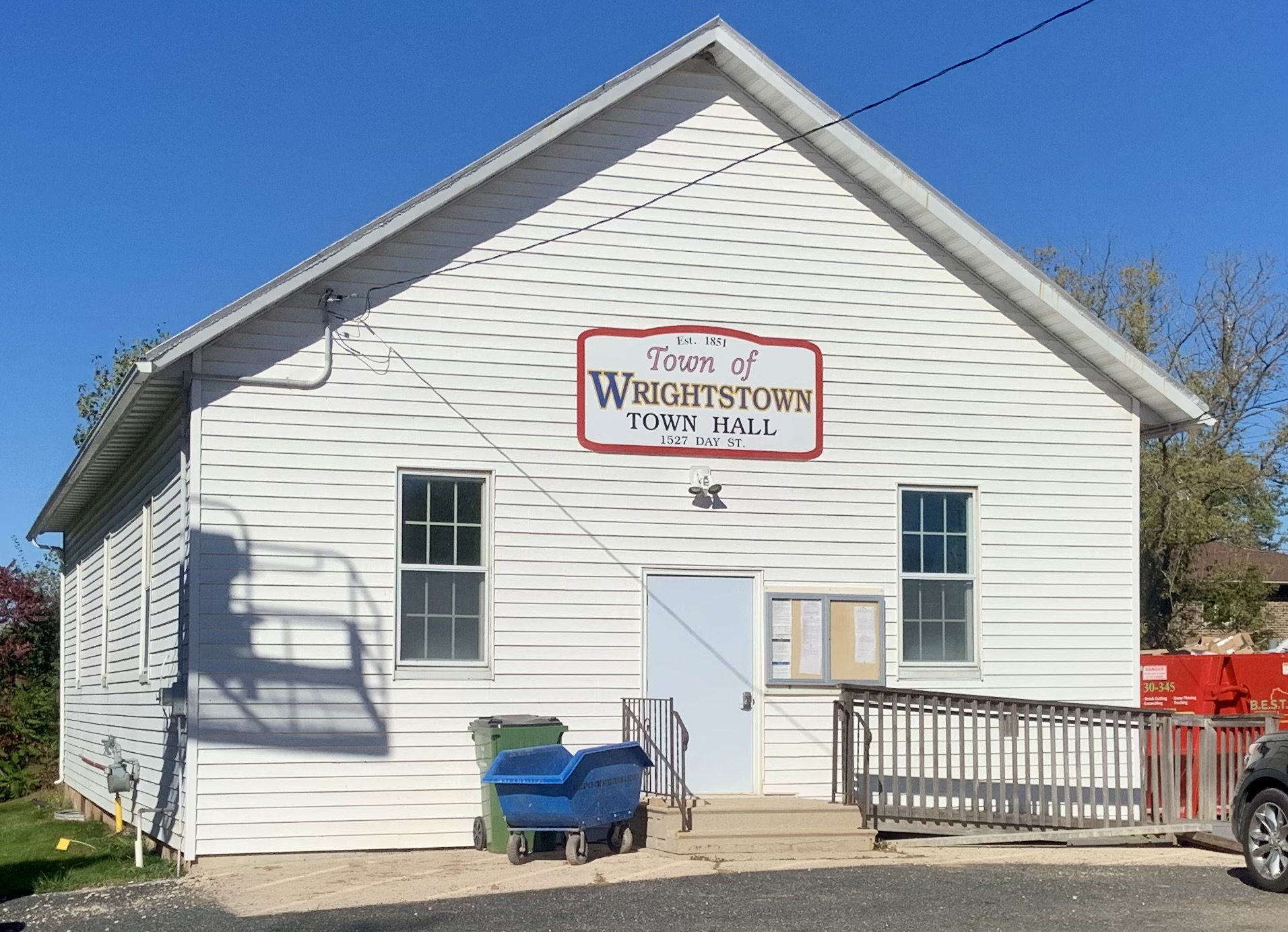
- Wrightstown Town Hall in Greenleaf

- Location of the town in Brown County, Wisconsin
- Coordinates: 44°19′54″N 88°06′02″W
- Country: United States
- State: Wisconsin
- County: Brown

Area
  - Total: 32.78 sq mi (84.9 km^{2})
  - Land: 32.57 sq mi (84.4 km^{2})
  - Water: 0.21 sq mi (0.54 km^{2})

Population (2020)
  - Total: 2,578
  - Density: 79.15/sq mi (30.56/km^{2})
- Time zone: UTC-6 (Central (CST))
  - Summer (DST): UTC-5 (CDT)
- Area code(s): 920 & 274
- GNIS feature ID: 1584485

Wrightstown is a town in Brown County in the U.S. state of Wisconsin. The population was 2,578 at the 2020 census. The Village of Wrightstown is mostly surrounded by the town, but is separate from it. The village of Greenleaf is located in the town. The unincorporated community of Sniderville is also located partially with the town.

== Geography ==
Wrightstown is located in southern Brown County, and is bordered by Outagamie County to the west. The Fox River crosses the western and northern borders of the town, flowing towards Green Bay. The village of Wrightstown is located on the Fox River near the western border of the town.

According to the United States Census Bureau, the town has a total area of 33.1 square miles (85.6 km^{2}), of which 32.9 square miles (85.1 km^{2}) is land and 0.19 square miles (0.5 km^{2}), or 0.62%, is water.

== Demographics ==
As of the census of 2000, there were 2,013 people, 666 households, and 542 families residing in the town. The population density was 60.0 people per square mile (23.2/km^{2}). There were 681 housing units at an average density of 20.3 per square mile (7.8/km^{2}). The racial makeup of the town was 98.26% White, 0.10% Black or African American, 0.50% Native American, 0.35% Asian, 0.15% from other races, and 0.65% from two or more races. 0.79% of the population were Hispanic or Latino of any race.

There were 666 households, out of which 43.8% had children under the age of 18 living with them, 71.6% were married couples living together, 5.4% had a female householder with no husband present, and 18.5% were non-families. 13.2% of all households were made up of individuals, and 3.6% had someone living alone who was 65 years of age or older. The average household size was 3.00 and the average family size was 3.30.

In the town, the population was spread out, with 31.3% under the age of 18, 7.8% from 18 to 24, 32.2% from 25 to 44, 21.5% from 45 to 64, and 7.3% who were 65 years of age or older. The median age was 33 years. For every 100 females, there were 105.2 males. For every 100 females age 18 and over, there were 109.5 males.

The median income for a household in the town was $54,712, and the median income for a family was $60,179. Males had a median income of $40,256 versus $26,852 for females. The per capita income for the town was $23,256. About 1.9% of families and 2.7% of the population were below the poverty line, including 1.3% of those under age 18 and 15.0% of those age 65 or over.

== History ==
Wrightstown is one of the oldest communities in Wisconsin. The name "Wrightstown" was declared in 1854 in honor of its founder, Hoel S. Wright, who, along with Carl G. Mueller and Charles West Day, are considered early pioneers of Brown County. Charles' parents, Otis and Elmira Day, immigrated from New York to Wisconsin in 1849. Their family traveled across the Great Lakes from Buffalo, New York, until they reached Wrightstown in 1850. Lucien Wright and his father Hoel sold Otis 80 acres (32 ha) of land to build a cabin of basswood boughs.

During the 1850s to 1860s, dense timber covered the land. This provided work for many, including the Day family. The family made 75 cents a load by making shingles by hand, which were then hauled to De Pere by ox.

Charles West Day married Juliette Chase on July 3, 1860. They had seven children, but two died during infancy. Otis Day died on June 20, 1882. His wife died eight years later on May 7, 1890.
