= Wrightstown, Wisconsin =

- Village
- Location of Wrightstown in Brown and Outagamie Counties, Wisconsin
- Coordinates: 44°19′35″N 88°10′34″W
- Country: United States
- State: Wisconsin
- Counties: Brown, Outagamie

Area
  - Total: 4.52 sq mi (11.71 km^{2})
  - Land: 4.31 sq mi (11.17 km^{2})
  - Water: 0.20 sq mi (0.53 km^{2})
- Elevation: 659 ft (201 m)

Population (2020)
  - Total: 3,179
  - Density: 813.2/sq mi (313.99/km^{2})
- Time zone: UTC-6 (Central (CST))
  - Summer (DST): UTC-5 (CDT)
- Area code: 920
- FIPS code: 55-89175
- GNIS feature ID: 1584484
- Website: www.wrightstown.us

Wrightstown is a village located in Brown and Outagamie counties in the U.S. state of Wisconsin. The population was 3,179 at the 2020 census. The village is surrounded mostly by the westernmost part of the Town of Wrightstown in Brown County. On February 28, 2002, the village annexed a portion of land within the adjacent Town of Kaukauna in Outagamie County.

Wrightstown is part of the Green Bay Metropolitan Statistical Area.

== History ==
=== Pre-colonial history ===
The area now known as Wrightstown lies within the ancestral homeland of the Menominee people, who inhabited the Fox River Valley for over 10,000 years. In the Treaty of Washington (1831), the Menominee ceded approximately 2.5 million acres of land, including present-day Wrightstown, to the United States government in exchange for approximately $92,000 in provisions and annuities. This cession occurred during the era of President Andrew Jackson's Indian Removal Act.

=== European-American settlement ===
The original establishment was called Bridgeport by its founder. Hoel S. Wright arrived in 1833, two years after the Menominee cession, and established a trading post and ferry service on land recently transferred to federal control. In 1843, Wright received a federal land patent for 121 acres on the east side of the Fox River. A post office called Wrightstown has been in operation since 1852. The village was named for Joel Wright, the owner of the original town site.

== Geography ==
According to the United States Census Bureau, the village has a total area of 4.30 square miles (11.14 km^{2}), of which 4.09 square miles (10.59 km^{2}) is land and 0.21 square miles (0.54 km^{2}) is water.

The Fox River flows through the middle of the village.

=== Climate ===
Wrightstown

Climate chart (precipitation, max. and min. temperature)
J	F	M	A	M	J	J	A	S	O	N	D
70 −7 −14	76 −8 −12	82 2 −7	132 15 1	116 20 7	127 25 14	104 27 17	104 26 19	83 22 11	125 15 5	76 6 −3	65 −7 −10
- █ Average max. and min. temperatures in °C
- █ Precipitation totals in mm
Imperial conversion
J	F	M	A	M	J	J	A	S	O	N	D
2.8 19 7	3 18 10	3.2 36 19	5.2 59 34	4.6 68 45	5 77 57	4.1 81 63	4.1 79 66	3.3 72 52	4.9 59 41	3 43 27	2.6 19 14
- █ Average max. and min. temperatures in °F
- █ Precipitation totals in inches

== Demographics ==
Historical population
Census	Pop.	Note	%±
1880	450		—
1890	476		5.8%
1900	420		−11.8%
1910	525		25.0%
1920	571		8.8%
1930	612		7.2%
1940	718		17.3%
1950	761		6.0%
1960	840		10.4%
1970	1,020		21.4%
1980	1,169		14.6%
1990	1,262		8.0%
2000	1,934		53.2%
2010	2,827		46.2%
2020	3,179		12.5%
2024 (est.)	3,303	▲	3.9%
U.S. Decennial Census

=== 2010 census ===
As of the census of 2010, there were 2,827 people, 1,027 households, and 776 families living in the village. The population density was 691.2 inhabitants per square mile (266.9/km^{2}). There were 1,087 housing units at an average density of 265.8 per square mile (102.6/km^{2}). The racial makeup of the village was 94.8% White, 0.8% African American, 0.8% Native American, 0.8% Asian, 1.7% from other races, and 1.0% from two or more races. Hispanic or Latino of any race were 4.4% of the population.

There were 1,027 households, of which 43.9% had children under the age of 18 living with them, 63.4% were married couples living together, 7.7% had a female householder with no husband present, 4.5% had a male householder with no wife present, and 24.4% were non-families. 19.4% of all households were made up of individuals, and 6.8% had someone living alone who was 65 years of age or older. The average household size was 2.75 and the average family size was 3.17.

The median age in the village was 33 years. 31.6% of residents were under the age of 18; 6% were between the ages of 18 and 24; 32.5% were from 25 to 44; 21.9% were from 45 to 64; and 8.1% were 65 years of age or older. The gender makeup of the village was 51.4% male and 48.6% female.

=== 2000 census ===
As of the census of 2000, there were 1,934 people, 701 households, and 525 families living in the village. The population density was 782.3 people per square mile (302.3/km^{2}). There were 729 housing units at an average density of 294.9 per square mile (114.0/km^{2}). The racial makeup of the village was 97.10% White, 0.26% Black or African American, 0.36% Native American, 0.93% Asian, 0.57% from other races, and 0.78% from two or more races. 1.76% of the population were Hispanic or Latino of any race.

There were 701 households, out of which 41.7% had children under the age of 18 living with them, 62.2% were married couples living together, 9.3% had a female householder with no husband present, and 25.0% were non-families. 20.3% of all households were made up of individuals, and 7.3% had someone living alone who was 65 years of age or older. The average household size was 2.76 and the average family size was 3.21.

In the village, the population was spread out, with 31.5% under the age of 18, 7.6% from 18 to 24, 36.1% from 25 to 44, 17.7% from 45 to 64, and 7.0% who were 65 years of age or older. The median age was 31 years. For every 100 females, there were 104.0 males. For every 100 females age 18 and over, there were 104.0 males.

The median income for a household in the village was $52,885, and the median income for a family was $57,788. Males had a median income of $39,632 versus $26,705 for females. The per capita income for the village was $20,767. About 3.5% of families and 5.4% of the population were below the poverty line, including 7.9% of those under age 18 and 9.7% of those age 65 or over.

== Religion ==
St. John Lutheran Church, a member of the Wisconsin Evangelical Lutheran Synod (WELS), is one of the churches in Wrightstown. Built in 1911, it was designed by architect Wallace W. De Long. In 2022, the building was converted to Turner Street Music Hall and the church was relocated to a new building.

== Images ==
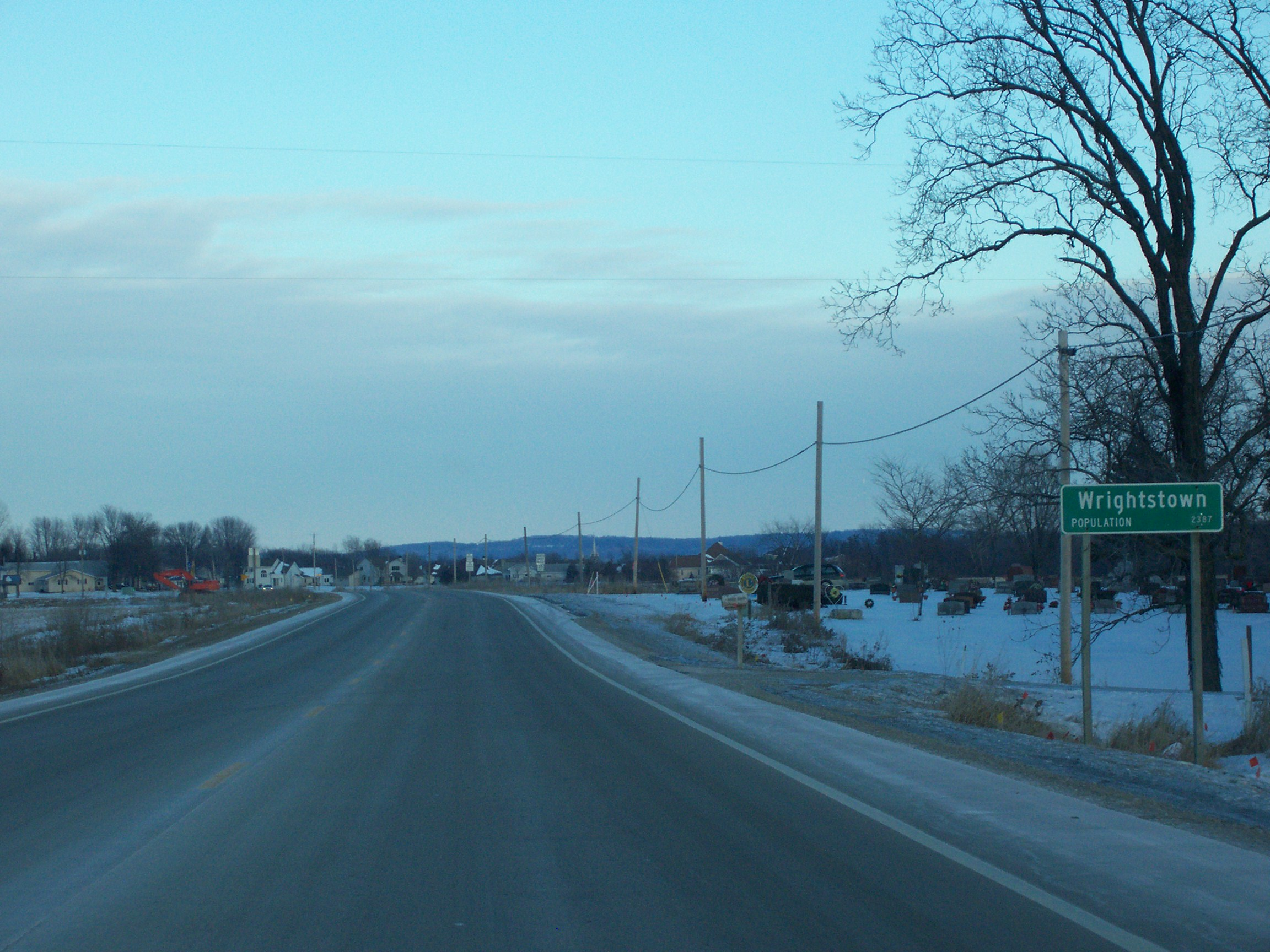
Sign

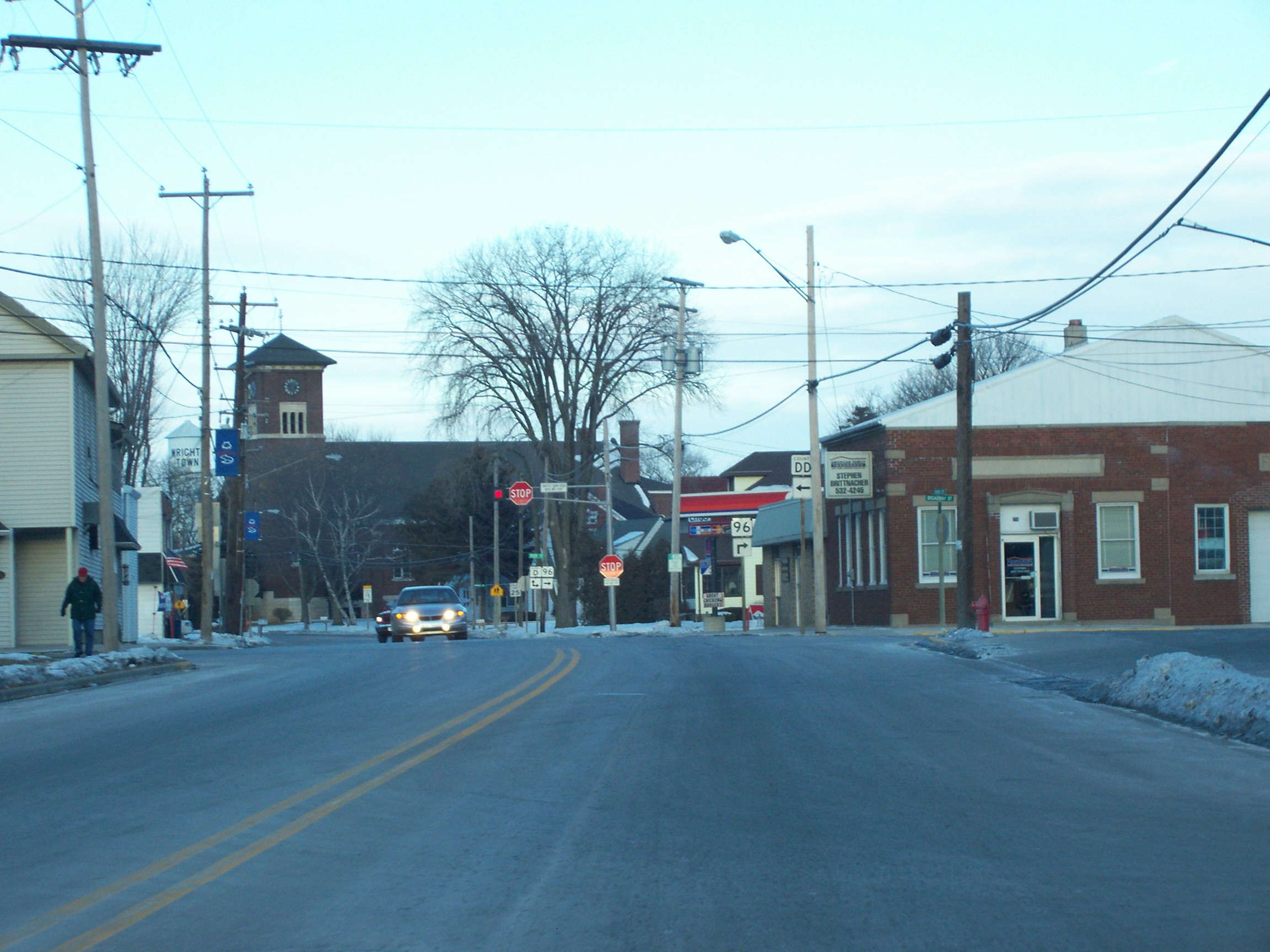
Downtown Wrightstown on WIS 96. St. Paul Catholic Church is visible in the back.

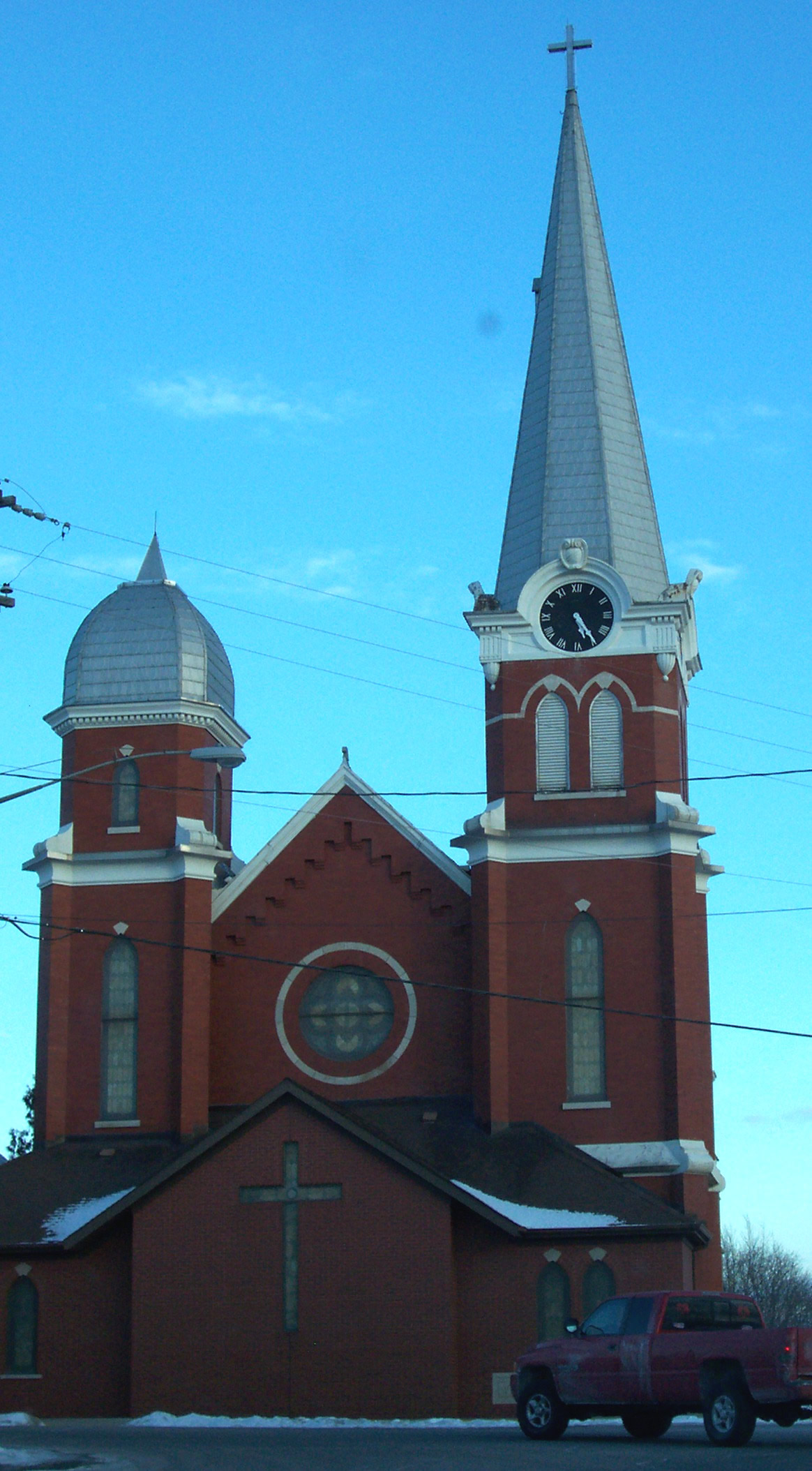
St. John Lutheran Church, now Turner Street Music Hall

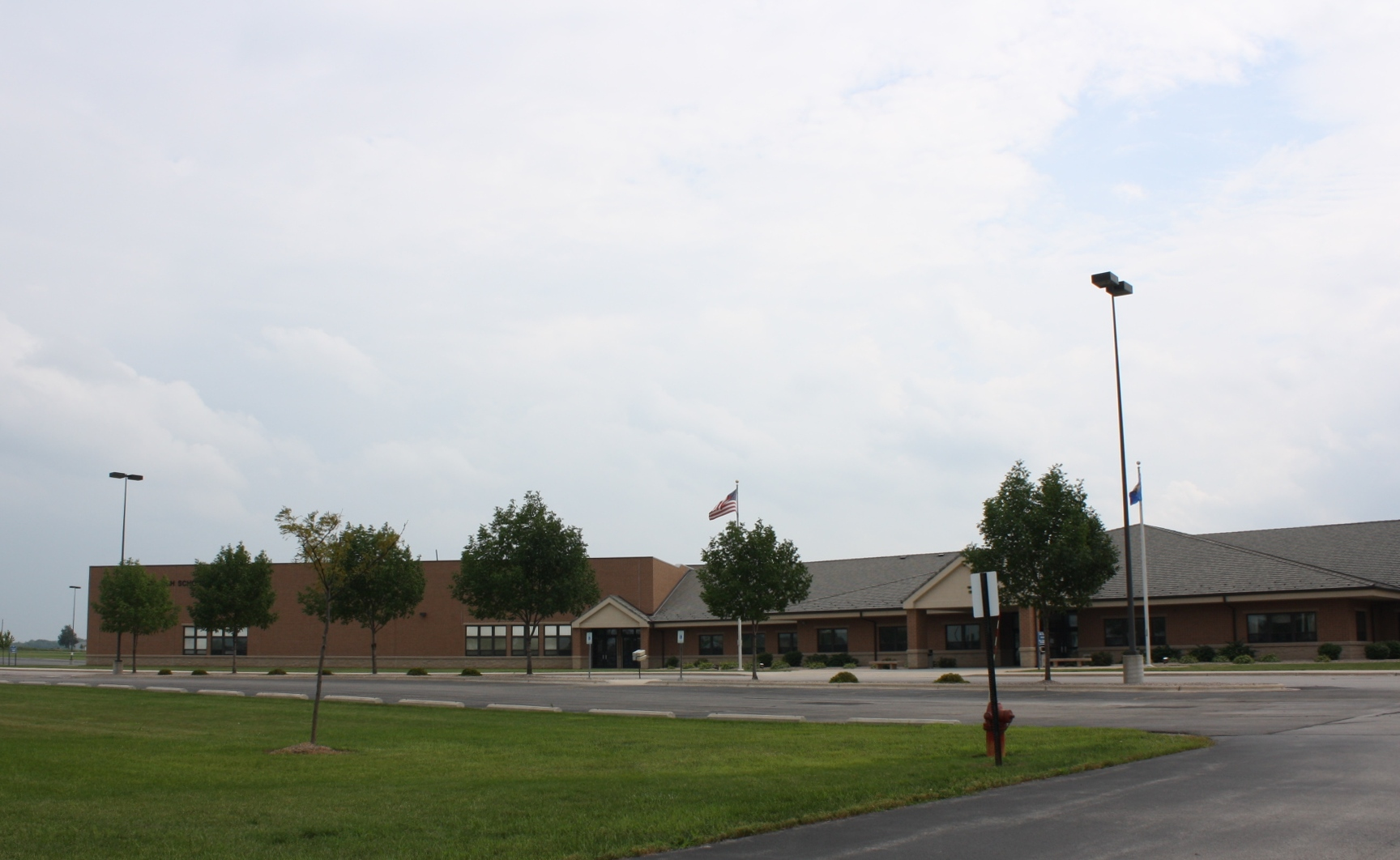
Wrightstown High School

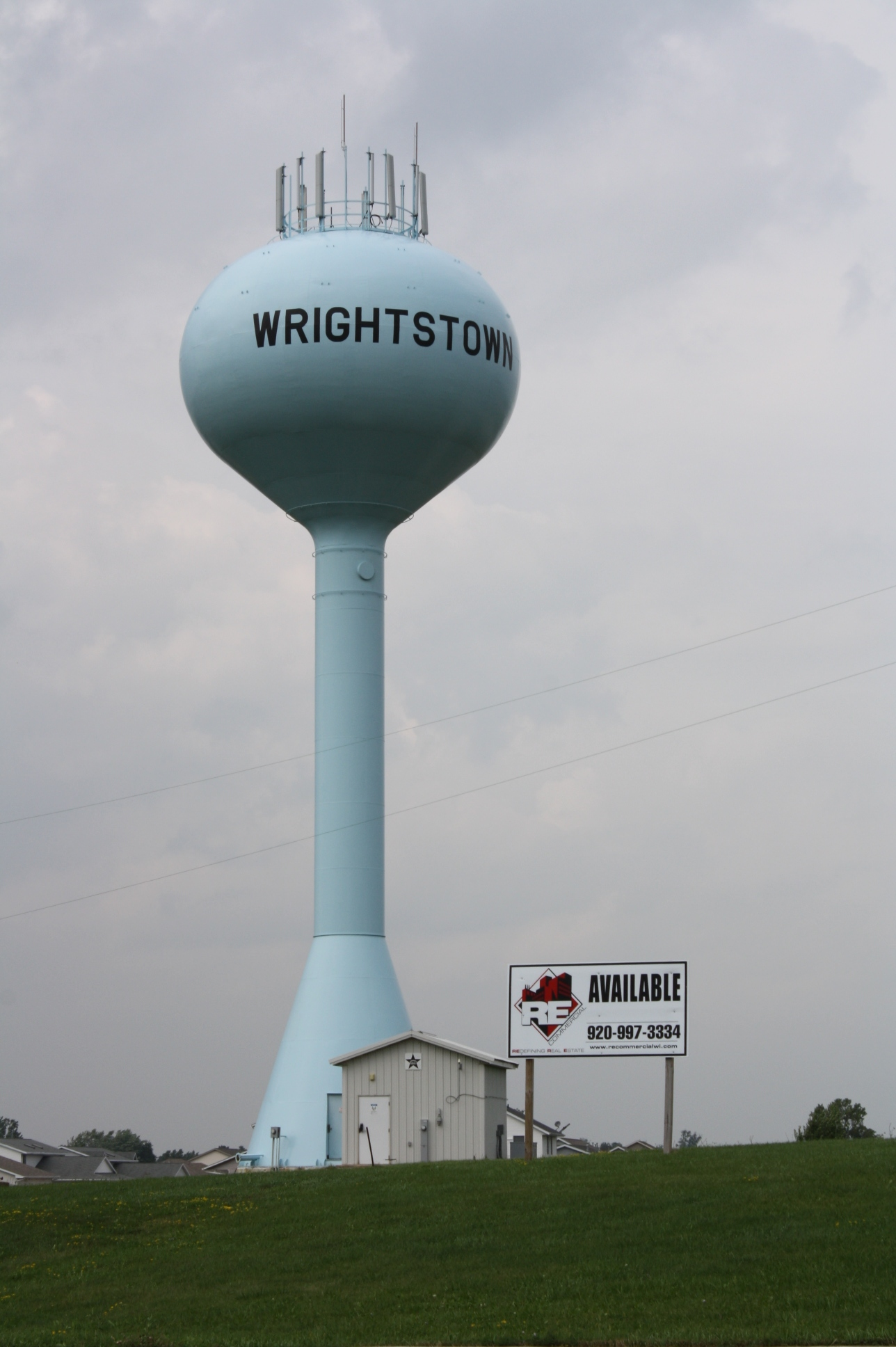
Water tower

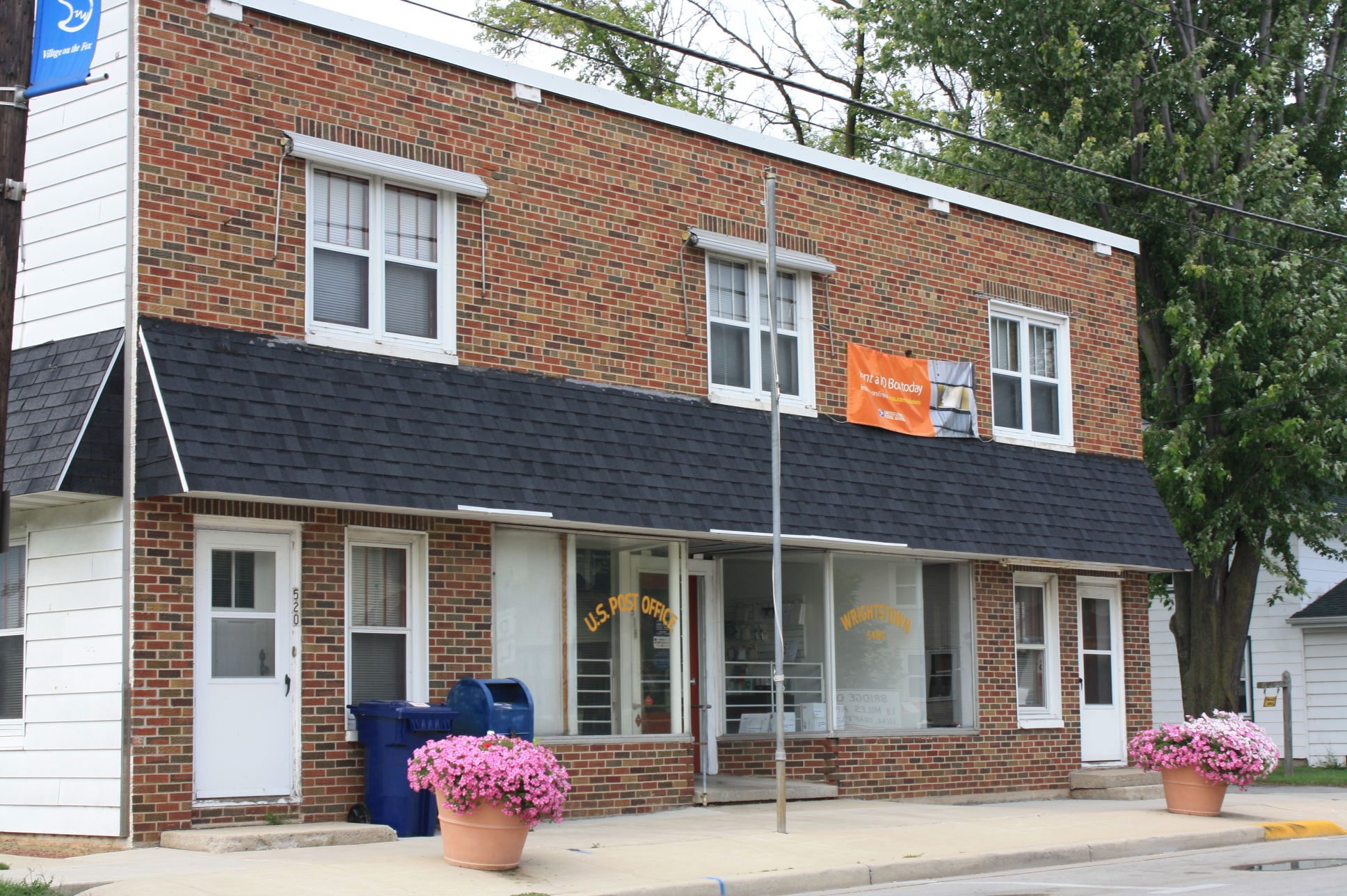
Post office

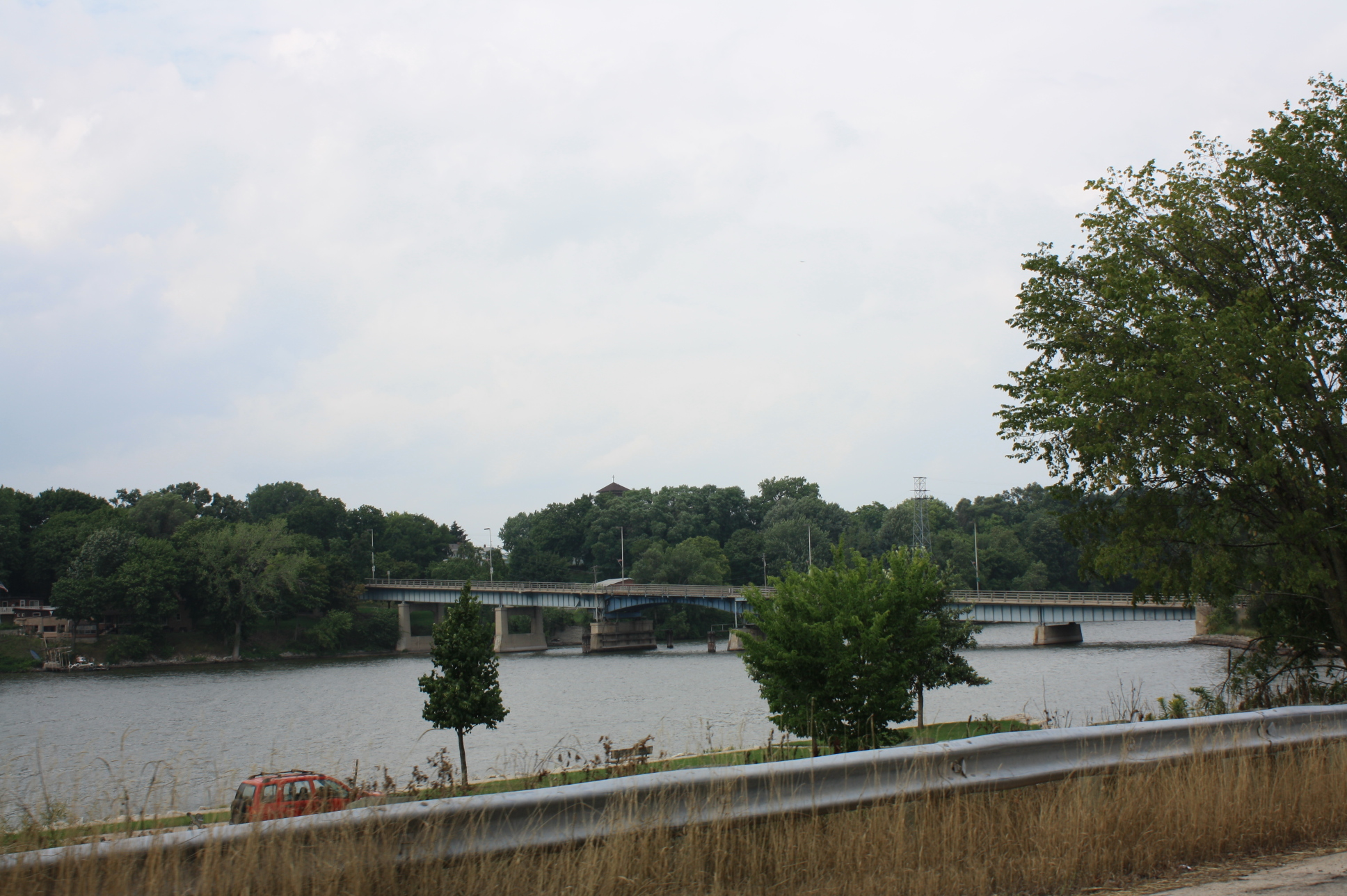
WIS 96 bridge over the Fox River

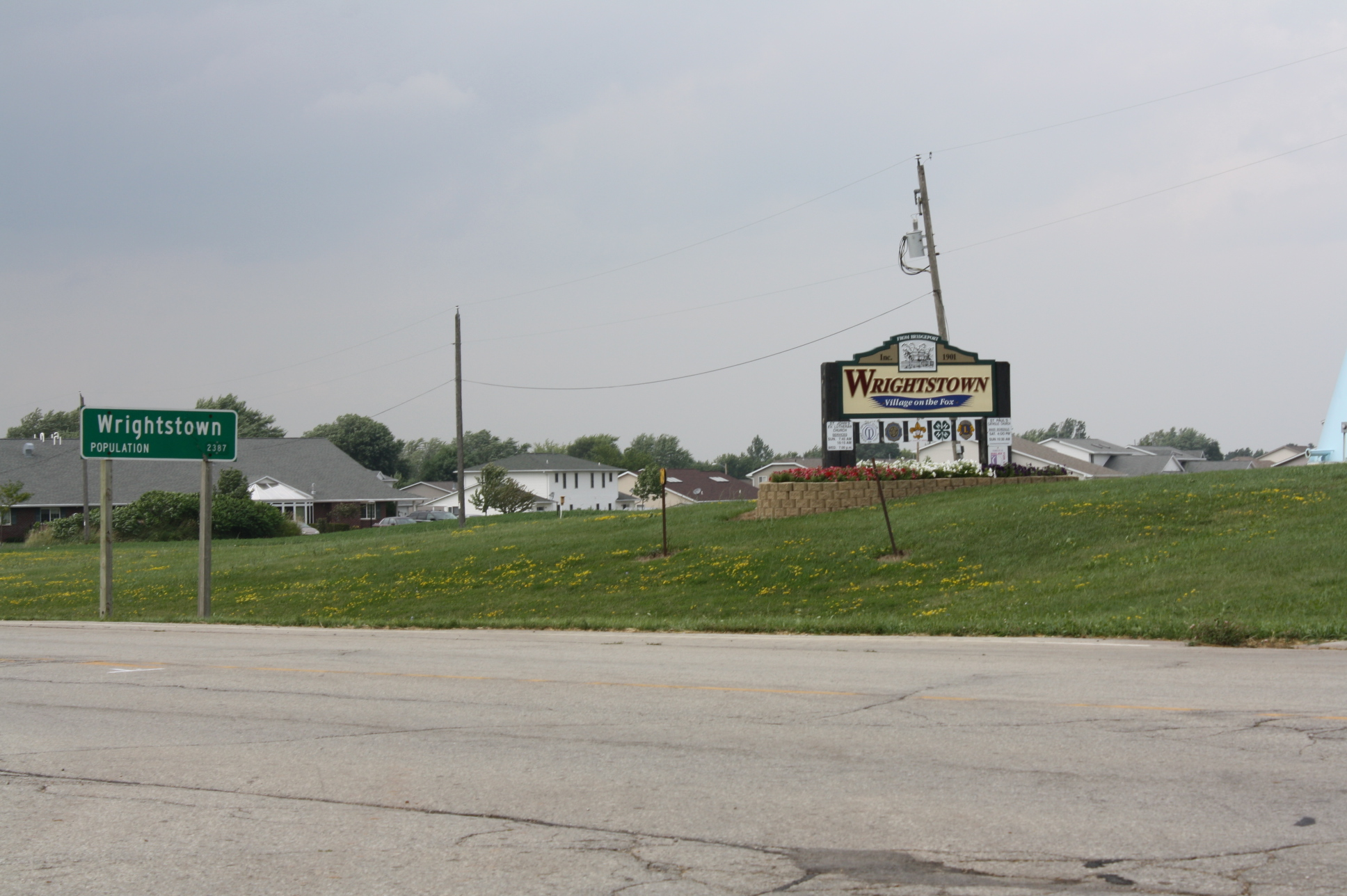
Welcome sign
